= South Cormorant River =

Coordinates: 47.87496°N 94.70637°W

Location
- Country: United States

Physical characteristics
- Source
  - location: Minnesota

The South Cormorant River is a 34.1-mile-long (54.9 km) tributary of the Blackduck River of Minnesota in the United States. It joins the Blackduck River 8.0 miles (12.9 km) upstream of the river's juncture with the North Cormorant River and 12.2 miles (19.6 km) upstream of the Blackduck's mouth at Red Lake.

== See also ==
- List of rivers of Minnesota
