= Lower Stump River =

- Mouth of the

Location
- Country: United States
- State: Minnesota
- County: Cook County

Physical characteristics
- Source
  - coordinates: 48.0411111°N 90.1147222°W
- Mouth
- Length: 5.2 mi-long (8.4 km)

Basin features
- River system: Stump River

The Lower Stump River is a 5.2-mile-long (8.4 km) tributary of the Stump River in northern Minnesota, the United States.

== See also ==
- List of rivers of Minnesota
