= Kelso River =

- Mouth of Kelso River

Location
- Country: United States
- State: Minnesota
- County: Cookk County

Physical characteristics
- Source
  - location: Kelso Mountain
  - coordinates: 47.9369444°N 90.9186111°W
- Mouth
  - location: Kelso Mountain
  - coordinates: 47.8921156°N 90.8879006°W
- Length: 4.0-mile-long (6.4 km)

The Kelso River is a 4.0-mile-long (6.4 km) stream in northern Minnesota, the United States. It flows entirely within the Boundary Waters Canoe Area Wilderness of Superior National Forest, ending at Sawbill Lake. Water from the Kelso River flows via Sawbill Creek (the outlet of Sawbill Lake) to the Temperance River and thence to Lake Superior.

== See also ==
- List of rivers of Minnesota
