= Little Tamarac River =

Coordinates: 48.1571838°N 94.4274490°W

Location
- Country: United States

Physical characteristics
- Source
  - location: Minnesota

The Little Tamarac River is a 14.2-mile-long (22.9 km) tributary of the Tamarac River of Minnesota in the United States. Via the Tamarac River, it is a tributary of Red Lake.

== See also ==
- List of rivers of Minnesota
