= Sand River (Stony River tributary) =

River of Minnesota, United States

- Location within Minnesota

Location
- Country: United States
- State: Minnesota
- County: Lake County

Physical characteristics
- Source
  - location: Greenwood Lake West
  - coordinates: 47.5649156°N 91.6984933°W
- Mouth
  - location: Slate Lake East
  - coordinates: 47°39′47″N 91°35′51″W

The Sand River is a river of Minnesota, United States. It is a tributary of the Stony River.

== See also ==
- List of rivers of Minnesota
