= Cat River =

Cat River may refer to:

- Cat River (Ontario), in Kenora District, Ontario, Canada
- Cat River (Minnesota), in Minnesota, United States
