= Little Langley River =

- Mouth of the Little Langley River

Location
- Country: United States
- State: Minnesota
- County: Lake County

Physical characteristics
- Source
  - coordinates: 47.2775°N 91.6433333°W
- Mouth
  - coordinates: 47.3052013°N 91.7157275°W
- Length: 4.2 mi-long (6.8 km)

Basin features
- River system: Cloquet River

The Little Langley River is a 4.2-mile-long (6.8 km) tributary of the Langley River of Minnesota, United States. It is part of the Cloquet River watershed, flowing to the Saint Louis River and ultimately Lake Superior.

== See also ==
- List of rivers of Minnesota
