= Little Net River =

- Mouth of the Little Net River

Location
- Country: United States
- State: Minnesota
- County: Carlton County, Pine County

Physical characteristics
- Source
  - location: Foxboro
  - coordinates: 46.4035534°N 92.3379727°W
- Mouth
  - location: Frogner
  - coordinates: 46.5021649°N 92.3590834°W
- Length: 12.1-mile-long (19.5 km)

Basin features
- River system: Nemadji River

The Little Net River is a 12.1-mile-long (19.5 km) tributary of the Net River of Minnesota, part of the Nemadji River watershed flowing to Lake Superior.

== See also ==
- List of rivers of Minnesota
