= Moose River (Nina Moose River tributary) =

Coordinates: 48°09′23″N 92°05′07″W

Location
- Country: United States

Physical characteristics
- Source
  - location: Minnesota

The Moose River is a river of Minnesota. It is a tributary of the Nina Moose River.

== See also ==
- List of rivers of Minnesota
