= Greenwood River (Stony River tributary) =

Coordinates: 47.6096351°N 91.6362663°W

Location
- Country: United States

Physical characteristics
- Source
  - location: Minnesota

The Greenwood River is a river of Minnesota. It is a tributary of the Stony River.

== See also ==
- List of rivers of Minnesota
