= Hill River (Lost River tributary) =

River in Minnesota, United States

Coordinates: 47.8344080°N 96.0475358°W

Location
- Country: United States

Physical characteristics
- Source
  - location: Minnesota

The Hill River is a 60.8-mile-long (97.8 km) tributary of the Lost River of western Minnesota in the United States. Through the Lost River, the Clearwater River, the Red Lake River, the Red River of the North, Lake Winnipeg, and the Nelson River, it forms part of the Hudson Bay watershed.

Hill River was named after the morainic hills surrounding the area.

== See also ==
- List of rivers of Minnesota
