= Lost River (Tamarac River tributary) =

Coordinates: 48.15691°N 94.38745°W

Location
- Country: United States

Physical characteristics
- Source
  - location: Minnesota

The Lost River is a 24.5-mile-long (39.4 km) tributary of the Tamarac River of northern Minnesota in the United States. Via the Tamarac River, it is a tributary of Red Lake.

== See also ==
- List of rivers of Minnesota
