= Shannon River =

Shannon River may refer to:

- River Shannon, Ireland
- Shannon River (Minnesota), located in Saint Louis County, Minnesota
- Shannon River (Tasmania), a tributary of Ouse River, itself a tributary of the Derwent; see Rivers of Tasmania
- Shannon River (Western Australia), a river in Western Australia.
