= Little Ann River =

Coordinates: 45.9149586°N 93.4202310°W

Location
- Country: United States

Physical characteristics
- Source
  - location: Minnesota

The Little Ann River is an 11.9-mile-long (19.2 km) tributary of the Ann River of Minnesota, United States.

== See also ==
- List of rivers of Minnesota
