= Birch River =

Birch River may refer to:

== Canada ==
- Birch River (Alberta), a river
- Birch River, Manitoba, a community

== United States ==
- Birch River (Alaska), a river by Central House
- Birch River (Maine), a river in Aroostook County, Maine
- Birch River (Minnesota), a river of Minnesota
- Birch River (West Virginia)
  - Birch River, West Virginia, an unincorporated community located on the river
