= Gull River (Turtle River tributary) =

Coordinates: 47.5913421°N 94.6480341°W

Location
- Country: United States

Physical characteristics
- Source
  - location: Minnesota

The Gull River is a river in Minnesota. It is a tributary of the Turtle River, a tributary of the Mississippi River.

== See also ==
- List of rivers of Minnesota
