= Poplar River (Lost River tributary) =

Coordinates: 47.8355197°N 96.0764263°W

Location
- Country: United States

Physical characteristics
- Source
  - location: Minnesota

The Poplar River is a 58.4-mile-long (94.0 km) tributary of the Lost River of western Minnesota in the United States. Via the Lost River, the Clearwater River, the Red Lake River, the Red River of the North, Lake Winnipeg, and the Nelson River, it is part of the Hudson Bay watershed.

The river's name comes from the Ojibwe Indians of the area, on account of the poplar trees near the river.

== See also ==
- List of rivers of Minnesota
