= List of rivers of Minnesota =

Watersheds of Minnesota

Minnesota has 6,564 natural rivers and streams that cumulatively flow for 69,000 miles (111,000 km). The Mississippi River begins its journey from its headwaters at Lake Itasca and crosses the Iowa border 680 mi (1,094 km) downstream. It is joined by the Minnesota River at Fort Snelling, by the St. Croix River near Hastings, by the Chippewa River at Wabasha, and by many smaller streams. The Red River, in the bed of glacial Lake Agassiz, drains the northwest part of the state northward toward Canada's Hudson Bay.

== By drainage basin (watershed) ==
This list is arranged by drainage basin with respective tributaries indented under each larger stream's name. The rivers and streams that flow through other states or Minnesota and other states are indicated, as well as the length of major rivers.

=== Great Lakes drainage basin ===
==== Lake Superior drainage basin ====
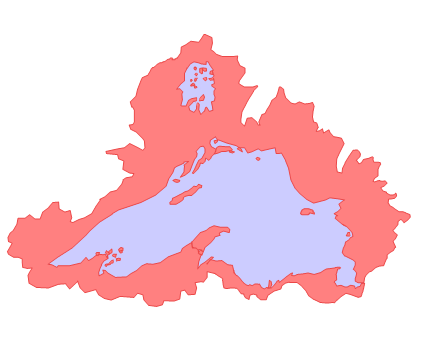
Lake Superior drainage basin

- Lake Superior
  - Pigeon River (Minnesota, Ontario), 31.2 mi-long (50.2 km)
    - Swamp River
    - Stump River, 14.2 mi-long (22.9 km)
      - Lower Stump River, 5.2 mi-long (8.4 km)
    - Royal River
      - Crocodile River
  - Reservation River, 6.9 mi-long (11.1 km)
  - Flute Reed River, 10.5 mi-long (16.9 km)
  - Brule River, 40.4 mi-long (65.0 km)
    - Greenwood River, 7.1 mi-long (11.4 km)
    - South Brule River
  - Kadunce River, 8.5 mi-long (13.7 km)
  - Kimball Creek, 8.9 mi-long (14.3 km)
  - Durfee Creek
  - Devil Track River, 8.7 mi-long (14.0 km)
    - Little Devil Track River, 6.1 mi-long (9.8 km)
  - Fall River, 3.3 mi-long (5.3 km)
  - Cascade River, 17.1 mi-long (27.5 km)
    - North Branch Cascade River
  - Poplar River, 21.7 mi-long (34.9 km)
    - Tait River, 12.8 mi-long (20.6 km)
  - Onion River, 6.1 mi-long (9.8 km)
    - West Branch Onion River
  - Temperance River, 39.2 mi-long (63.1 km)
    - Sawbill Creek, 4.7 mi-long (7.6 km)
      - Kelso River, 4.0 mi-long (6.4 km)
    - Vern River, 4.0 mi-long (6.4 km)
  - Cross River, 20.4 mi-long (32.8 km)
  - Two Island River, 15.0 mi-long (24.1 km)
  - Caribou River, 15.0 mi-long (24.1 km)
  - Little Manitou River, 1.8 mi-long (2.9 km)
  - Manitou River, 24.9 mi-long (40.1 km)
    - South Branch Manitou River
  - Little Marais River, -
  - Baptism River, 8.8 mi-long (14.2 km)
    - East Branch Baptism River
    - West Branch Baptism River
  - Beaver River, 23.4 mi-long (37.7 km)
    - East Branch Beaver River
    - West Branch Beaver River (Lake Superior)
  - Split Rock River, 3.5 mi-long (5.6 km)
    - East Split Rock River
    - West Split Rock River
  - Gooseberry River, 23 mi-long (37 km)
    - Skunk Creek, 12.3 mi-long (19.8 km)
    - Little Gooseberry River, 4.8 mi-long (7.7 km)
  - Encampment River
  - Stewart River
    - Little Stewart River
  - Knife River, 23.9 mi-long (38.5 km)
    - Little Knife River, 7.4 mi-long (11.9 km)
    - West Branch Knife River
    - Little Knife River, located in Lake County
  - Little Sucker River, 1.6 mi-long (2.6 km)
  - Big Sucker Creek, 18.2 mi-long (29.3 km)
  - French River, 13 mi-long (21 km)
  - Talmadge River, 6.0 mi-long (9.7 km)
  - Lester River, 19.3 mi-long (31.1 km)
  - Tischer Creek, 11.3 mi-long (18.2 km)
  - Oregon Creek, 0.8 mi-long (1.3 km)
  - Chester Creek, 11.4 mi-long (18.3 km)
  - Brewery Creek, 0.9 mi-long (1.4 km)
  - Clarkhouse Creek, 0.5 mi-long (0.80 km)
  - St. Louis River (Minnesota, Wisconsin), 192 mi-long (309 km)
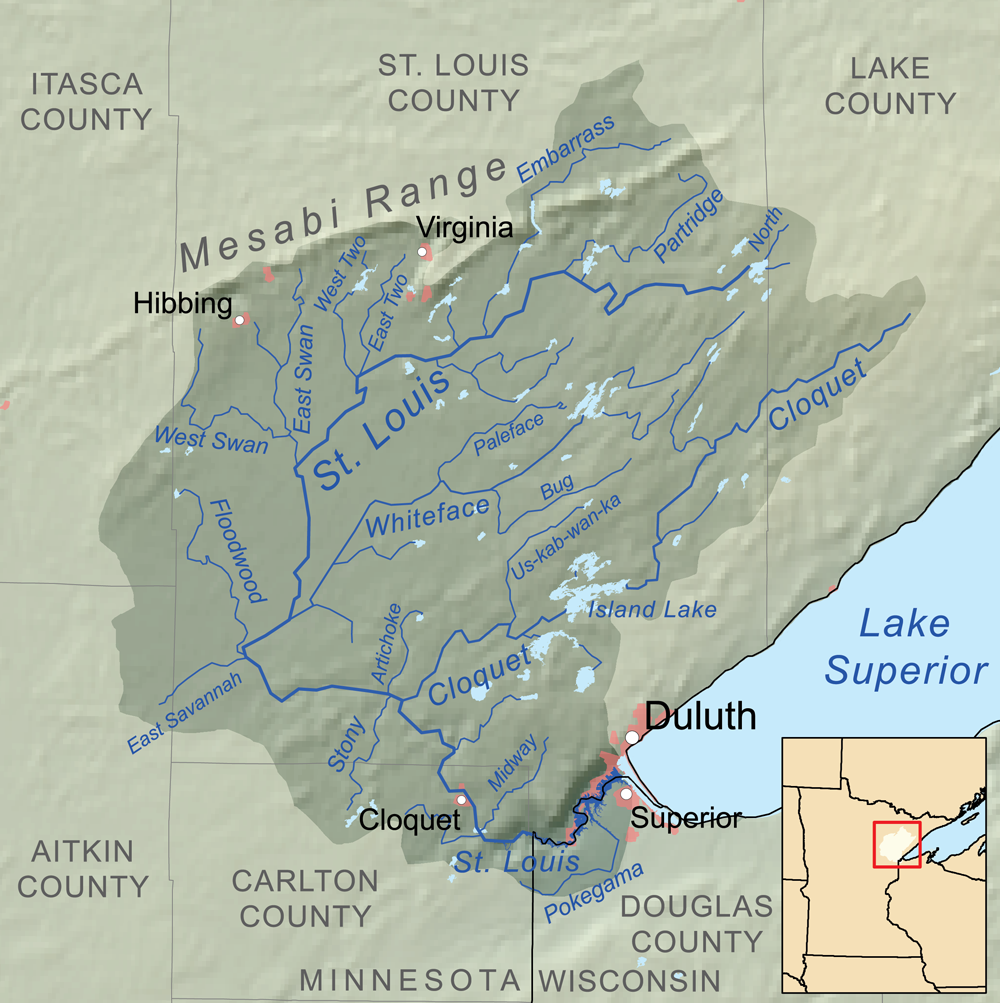
    Map of the Saint Louis River drainage basin showing the Cloquet River
    - Buckingham Creek,1.9 mi-long (3.1 km)
    - Coffee Creek, 2.3 mi-long (3.7 km)
    - Miller Creek,17.8 mi-long (28.6 km)
    - Merritt Creek, 3.7 mi-long (6.0 km)
    - Keene Creek, 8.4 mi-long (13.5 km)
    - Kingsbury Creek, 11.7 mi-long (18.8 km)
    - Pokegama River, 26.3 mi-long (42.3 km)
    - Knowlton Creek, 1.8 mi-long (2.9 km)
    - Stewart Creek, 3.4 mi-long (5.5 km)
    - U.S. Steel Creek, 6.8 mi-long (10.9 km)
    - Little Pokegama River
    - Sargent Creek, 8.4 mi-long (13.5 km)
    - Red River, 10.6 mi-long (17.1 km)
    - Mission Creek, 7.1 mi-long (11.4 km)
    - Little River, 2.1 mi-long (3.4 km)
    - Midway River, 18.8 mi-long (30.3 km)
    - Pine River, 15.0 mi-long (24.1 km)
    - Cloquet River, 104 mi-long (167 km)
      - Us-kab-wan-ka River, 19.7 mi-long (31.7 km)
      - Beaver River, 13.6 mi-long (21.9 km)
      - Otter River, 0.17 mi-long (0.27 km)
      - Little Cloquet River, 7.6 mi-long (12.2 km)
      - West Branch Cloquet River
      - Langley River, 11.9 mi-long (19.2 km)
        - Little Langley River, 4.2 mi-long (6.8 km)
    - Artichoke River, 13.5 mi-long (21.7 km)
    - Ahmik River, 5.2 mi-long (8.4 km)
    - McCarty River, 6.8 mi-long (10.9 km)
    - East Savanna River, 15.3 mi-long (24.6 km)
    - Floodwood River, 32.1 mi-long (51.7 km)
      - West Branch Floodwood River
    - Whiteface River, 64.4 mi-long (103.6 km)
      - Little Whiteface River (South), 4.4 mi-long (7.1 km)
      - Little Whiteface River (North), 8.8 mi-long (14.2 km)
      - Paleface River, 26.0 mi-long (41.8 km)
      - North Branch Whiteface River
      - South Branch Whiteface River
    - East Swan River, 24.2 mi-long (38.9 km)
      - West Swan River, 42.2 mi-long (67.9 km)
    - West Two River, 26.5 mi-long (42.6 km)
    - East Two River, 25.0 mi-long (40.2 km)
    - Embarrass River, 50.5 mi-long (81.3 km)
    - Partridge River, 37.0 mi-long (59.5 km)
      - South Branch Partridge River
    - East River, 3.0 mi-long (4.8 km)
    - North River, 6 mi-long (9.7 km)
  - Nemadji River, 70.8 mi-long (113.9 km)
    - South Fork Nemadji River
      - Net River, 24.5 mi-long (39.4 km)
        - Little Net River, 12.1 mi-long (19.5 km)
    - North Fork Nemadji River
      - Blackhoof River, 26.3 mi-long (42.3 km)

=== Mississippi River drainage basin ===
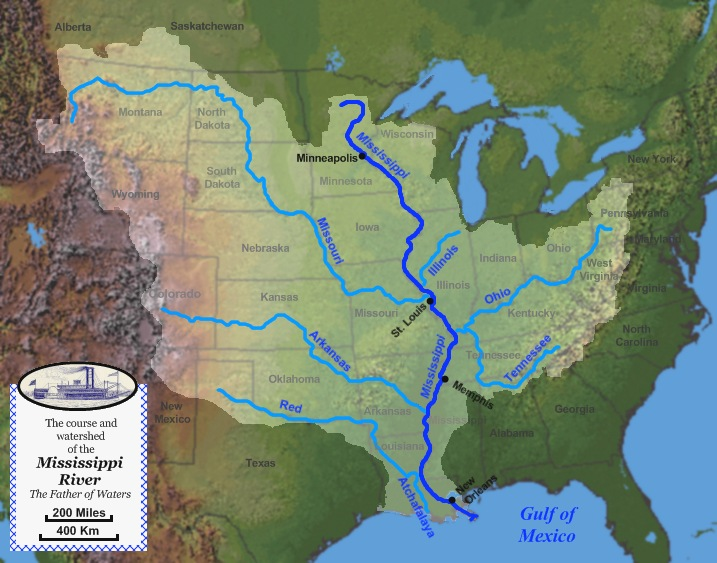
Mississippi River drainage basin

The Mississippi River is the longest river flowing through Minnesota. It originates in Lake Itasca and flows through Minnesota, Wisconsin, Iowa, Illinois, Missouri, Kentucky, Tennessee, Arkansas, Mississippi, and Louisiana.

==== Upper Mississippi River (below St. Anthony Falls) drainage basin ====
- Mississippi River, 2,320 mi-long (3,730 km); 680 mi (1,090 km) within Minnesota
  - Missouri River (Missouri, Iowa, South Dakota), 2,341 mi-long (3,767 km)
    - Little Sioux River (Minnesota, Iowa), 258 mi-long (415 km)
      - Ocheyedan River (Minnesota, Iowa), 58 mi-long (93 km)
      - West Fork Little Sioux River
    - Big Sioux River (Iowa, South Dakota), 418 mi-long (673 km)
      - Rock River (Iowa, Minnesota), 144 mi-long (232 km)
        - Little Rock River (Iowa, Minnesota)
        - East Branch Rock River
      - Split Rock Creek (Minnesota, South Dakota), 55 mi-long (89 km)
        - Pipestone Creek, 53.2 mi-long (85.6 km)
      - Flandreau Creek (Minnesota, South Dakota), 41.0 mi-long (66.0 km)
      - Beaver Creek (Big Sioux River tributary)
  - Des Moines River (Iowa, Minnesota, Missouri), 525 mi-long (845 km)
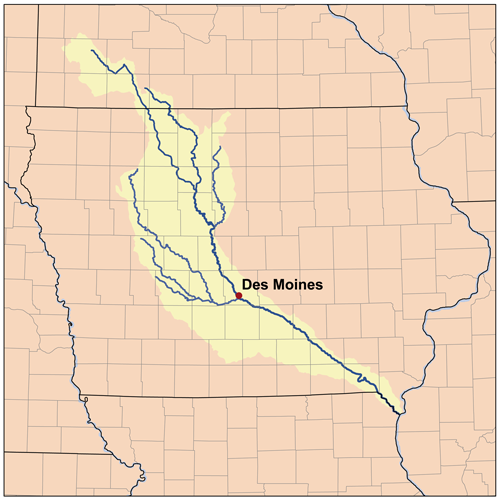
    Des Moines River watershed
    - East Fork Des Moines River (Minnesota, Iowa)
    - Heron Lake Outlet
      - Jack Creek, 64 mi-long (103 km)
      - Diversion Creek
        - Okabena Creek
    - Lime Creek (Minnesota, Iowa), 28.6 mi-long (46.0 km)
    - Beaver Creek (Des Moines River tributary)
  - Iowa River (Iowa), 323 mi-long (520 km)
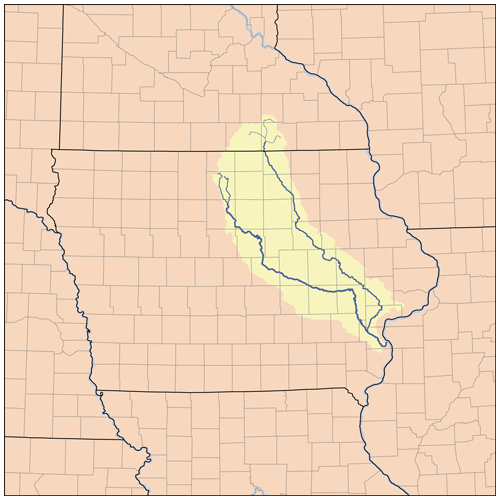
    Iowa River watershed
    - Cedar River (Minnesota, Iowa), 338 mi-long (544 km)
      - Shell Rock River (Minnesota, Iowa), 113 mi-long (182 km)
        - Winnebago River (Iowa), 72 mi-long (116 km)
          - Lime Creek (Minnesota, Iowa), 19.8 mi-long (31.9 km)
      - Little Cedar River (Iowa and Minnesota) (Iowa, Minnesota), 82.4 mi-long (132.6 km)
      - Little Cedar River (Dodge County, Minnesota), 10.5 mi-long (16.9 km)
  - Wapsipinicon River (Minnesota, Iowa), 299.5 mi-long (482.0 km)
  - Upper Iowa River (Iowa), 156 mi-long (251 km)
    - Pine Creek (Minnesota, Iowa)
    - Little Iowa River
    - North Branch Upper Iowa River
  - Winnebago Creek, 23.6 mi-long (38.0 km)
  - Crooked Creek, 9.9 mi-long (15.9 km)
    - North Fork Crooked Creek
    - South Fork Crooked Creek
  - Root River, 80 mi-long (130 km)
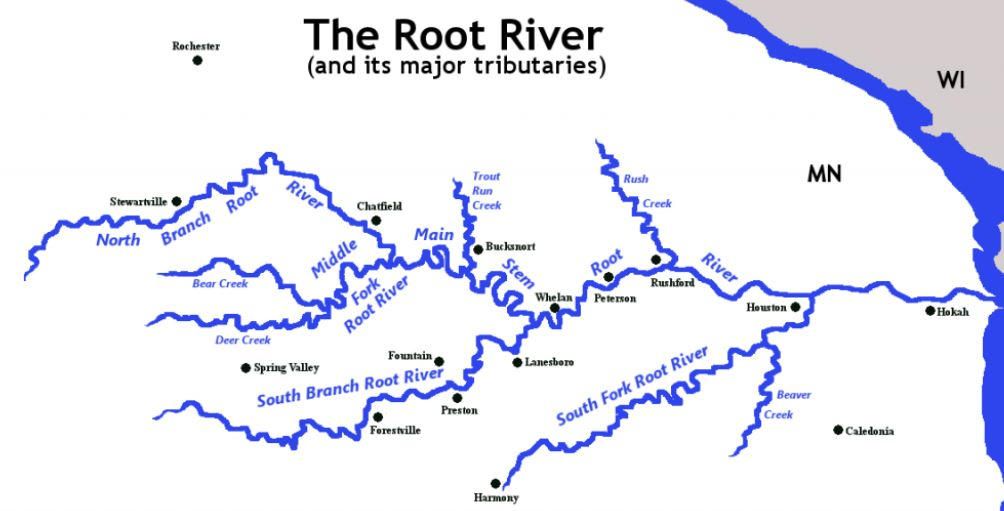
    Root River tributaries
    - North Branch Root River
    - Middle Branch Root River
    - Trout Run
    - South Branch Root River
      - Camp Creek (Root River tributary)
      - Etna Creek
      - South Branch Etna Creek
      - Canfield Creek
      - Forestville Creek
      - Willow Creek
    - Rush Creek
      - Ferguson Creek
      - Ahrensfeld Creek
      - Borson Spring
      - Pine Creek (Rush Creek tributary)
        - Coolridge Creek
        - Hemingway Creek
    - South Fork Root River
      - Badger Creek
      - Beaver Creek
  - Pine Creek, 23.7 mi-long (38.1 km)
  - Whitewater River, 16.6 mi-long (26.7 km)
    - North Fork Whitewater River
      - Middle Fork Whitewater River
    - South Fork Whitewater River
  - Zumbro River, 64.6 mi-long (104.0 km)
    - North Fork Zumbro River
    - Middle Fork Zumbro River
      - North Branch Middle Fork Zumbro River
      - South Branch Middle Fork Zumbro River
    - South Fork Zumbro River
  - Wells Creek, 27.6 mi-long (44.4 km)
  - Hay Creek, 25.1 mi-long (40.4 km)
  - Cannon River, 112 mi-long (180 km)
    - North Cannon River, a distributary
    - Little Cannon River (Cannon River tributary), 30.6 mi-long (49.2 km)
    - Straight River, 55.6 mi-long (89.5 km)
    - Little Cannon River (Sabre Lake), 5.7 mi-long (9.2 km)
    - Belle Creek (Cannon River tributary)
    - Trout Brook, 4.58 mi-long (7.37 km)
  - Vermillion River, 59.6 mi-long (95.9 km)
    - South Branch Vermillion River

==== St. Croix River drainage basin ====
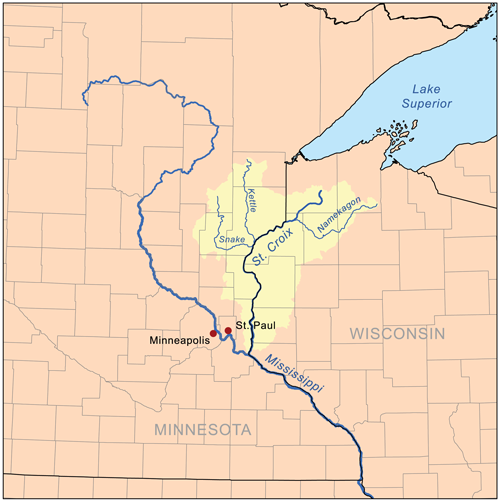
St. Croix River drainage basin

- Mississippi River
  - St. Croix River (Minnesota, Wisconsin), 169 mi-long (272 km)
    - Sunrise River, 39.1 mi-long (62.9 km)
      - North Branch Sunrise River
      - West Branch Sunrise River
      - South Branch Sunrise River
    - Snake River, 104 mi-long (167 km)
      - Groundhouse River, 39.8 mi-long (64.1 km)
        - South Fork Groundhouse River
        - West Fork Groundhouse River
      - Ann River, 14.4 mi-long (23.2 km)
        - Little Ann River, 11.9 mi-long (19.2 km)
      - Knife River, 27.4 mi-long (44.1 km)
    - Kettle River, 83.6 mi-long (134.5 km)
      - Grindstone River, 6.7 mi-long (10.8 km)
        - North Branch Grindstone River
        - South Branch Grindstone River
      - Pine River, 23.0 mi-long (37.0 km)
      - Willow River, 31.4 mi-long (50.5 km)
        - Little Willow River, 31.4 mi-long (50.5 km)
      - Moose Horn River, 36.4 mi-long (58.6 km)
        - Portage River, 8.8 mi-long (14.2 km)
        - West Fork Moose Horn River
      - Split Rock River, 20.4 mi-long (32.8 km)
      - Dead Moose River, 15.2 mi-long (24.5 km)
      - West Branch Kettle River
    - Sand Creek, 43.3 mi-long (69.7 km)
    - Lower Tamarack River, 39.0 mi-long (62.8 km)
    - Upper Tamarack River, 31.0 mi-long (49.9 km)
    - Brown's Creek (St. Croix River tributary), 9.7 mi-long (15.6 km)

==== Minnesota River drainage basin ====
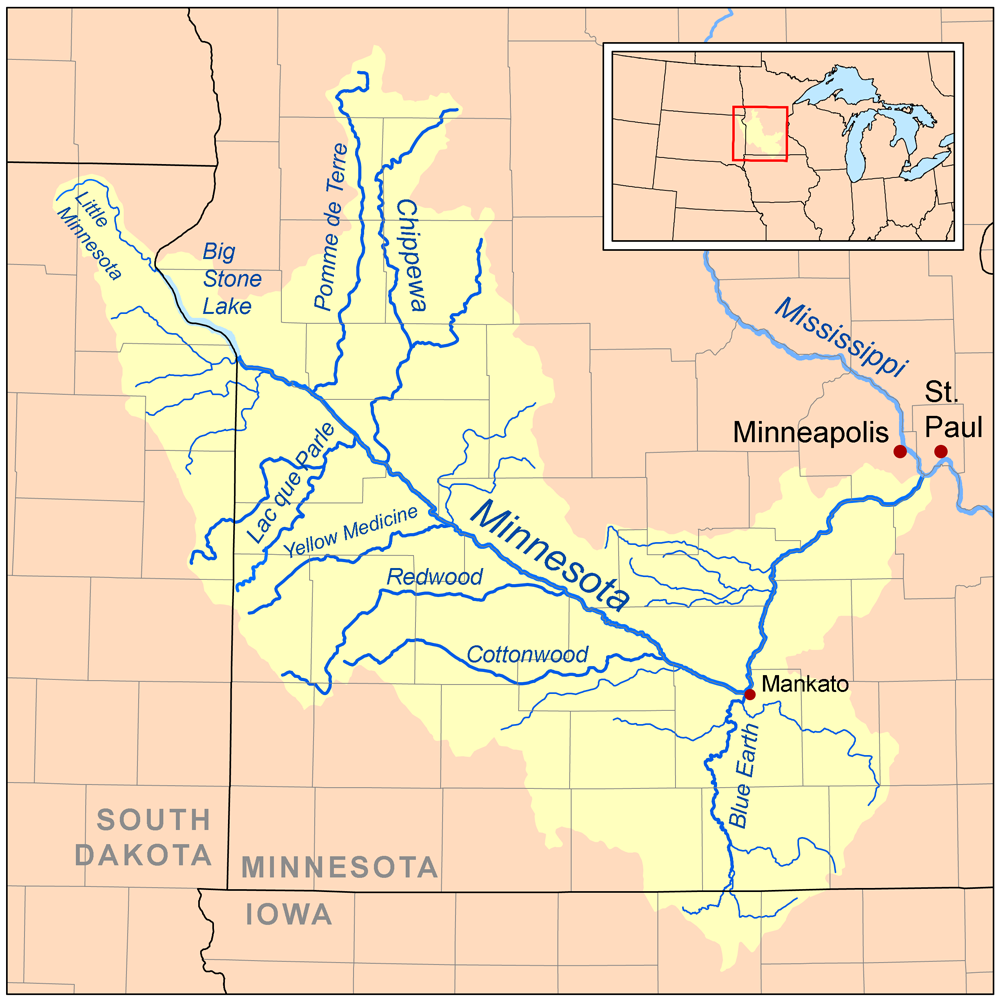
Minnesota River drainage basin

The Minnesota River is the longest river that is entirely within Minnesota.

- Mississippi River
  - Minnesota River, 370 mi-long (600 km)
    - Credit River, 21.5 mi (34.6 km)
    - Sand Creek, 36.6 mi-long (58.9 km)
    - High Island Creek, 69.4 mi-long (111.7 km)
    - Rush River, 19.8 mi-long (31.9 km)
      - South Branch Rush River
      - Middle Branch Rush River
      - North Branch Rush River
    - Blue Earth River, 108 mi (174 km)
      - Le Sueur River, 110.9 mi (178.5 km)
        - Maple River, 80.3 mi-long (129.2 km)
        - Cobb River, 78.6 mi-long (126.5 km)
          - Little Cobb River, 78.6 mi-long (126.5 km)
        - Little Le Sueur River, 110.9 mi (178.5 km)
      - Watonwan River, 113.2 mi (182.2 km)
        - Perch Creek, 37.3 mi-long (60.0 km)
        - South Fork Watonwan River
        - North Fork Watonwan River
      - Elm Creek, 89.5 mi-long (144.0 km)
      - East Branch Blue Earth River
      - Middle Branch Blue Earth River
      - West Branch Blue Earth River
    - Little Cottonwood River, 82.9 mi-long (133.4 km)
    - Cottonwood River, 152.4 mi-long (245.3 km)
      - Sleepy Eye Creek, 51.8 mi-long (83.4 km)
      - Plum Creek, 35.4 mi-long (57.0 km)
    - Redwood River, 127.1 mi-long (204.5 km)
    - Hawk Creek, 62.0 mi-long (99.8 km)
    - Yellow Medicine River, 107.2 mi-long (172.5 km)
      - Spring Creek, 33.4 mi-long (53.8 km)
      - North Branch Yellow Medicine River
      - South Branch Yellow Medicine River
    - Chippewa River, 153-mile-long (246 km)
      - Shakopee Creek, 48.6-mile-long (78.2 km)
      - East Branch Chippewa River
      - Little Chippewa River, 153 mi-long (246 km)
    - Lac qui Parle River, 118.3 mi-long (190.4 km)
      - West Branch Lac qui Parle River
    - Pomme de Terre River, 124.5 mi-long (200.4 km)
    - Yellow Bank River, 12.0-mile-long (19.3 km)
      - North Fork Yellow Bank River
      - South Fork Yellow Bank River
    - Whetstone River, 12.7-kilometre-long (7.9 mi)
    - Little Minnesota River, 71.4-mile-long (114.9 km)

==== Upper Mississippi River, Headwaters region (above St. Anthony Falls) drainage basin ====
- Mississippi River
  - Rice Creek, 28 mi (45 km)
  - Rum River, 151 mi (243 km)
    - Mike Drew Brook
    - West Branch Rum River
  - Crow River, 24.8 mi (39.9 km)
    - North Fork Crow River, 157.5 mi-long (253.5 km)
      - Middle Fork Crow River, 45.1 mi-long (72.6 km)
      - Skunk River
    - South Fork Crow River, 116 mi-long (187 km)
      - Buffalo Creek, 84.3 mi-long (135.7 km)
  - Elk River, 84.0 mi-long (135.2 km)
    - St. Francis River, 79.0 mi-long (127.1 km)
      - West Branch St. Francis River
    - Snake River
  - Clearwater River, 43.4 mi-long (69.8 km)
  - Sauk River, 122 mi-long (196 km)
    - Ashley Creek, 28.3 mi-long (45.5 km)
  - Watab River, 9.8 mi-long (15.8 km)
    - North Fork Watab River
    - South Fork Watab River
  - Platte River, 55.1 mi-long (88.7 km)
    - Skunk River, 36.2 mi-long (58.3 km)
  - Two River, 5.6 mi-long (9.0 km)
    - North Two River, 22.4 mi-long (36.0 km)
    - South Two River, 22.8 mi-long (36.7 km)
  - Little Two River, 15.9 mi-long (25.6 km)
  - Swan River, 37.0 mi-long (59.5 km)
    - Little Swan River, 13.9 mi-long (22.4 km)
    - Spring Branch Swan River
  - Little Elk River, 29.4 mi-long (47.3 km)
    - South Branch Little Elk River
  - Nokasippi River, 46.5 mi-long (74.8 km)
    - Little Nokasippi River, 13.8 mi-long (22.2 km)
  - Crow Wing River, 113 mi-long (182 km)
    - Gull River, 14.2 mi-long (22.9 km)
    - Long Prairie River, 96 mi-long (154 km)
    - Partridge River, 32.6 mi-long (52.5 km)
      - Little Partridge River, 21.1 mi-long (34.0 km)
    - Leaf River, 43.6 mi-long (70.2 km)
      - Redeye River, 73 mi-long (117 km)
      - Wing River, 48.2 mi-long (77.6 km)
    - Cat River, 16.3 mi-long (26.2 km)
    - Shell River, 47.8 mi-long (76.9 km)
      - Fish Hook River, 8.54 mi-long (13.74 km)
        - Straight River
        - Portage River
        - Potato River
      - Blueberry River, 20 mi-long (32 km)
        - Kettle River, 17.2 mi-long (27.7 km)<
  - Rabbit River, 8.6 mi-long (13.8 km)
  - Pine River, 56.9 mi-long (91.6 km)
    - Little Pine River, 29.7 mi-long (47.8 km)
    - South Fork Pine River
  - Little Willow River, 26.2 mi-long (42.2 km)
  - Ripple River, 11 mi-long (18 km)
  - Rice River, 57.1 mi-long (91.9 km)
  - Willow River, 45 mi-long (72 km)
    - Hill River
      - Little Hill River
    - Moose River
    - North Fork Willow River
    - South Fork Willow River
  - Sandy River
    - Prairie River
      - Tamarack River
        - Little Tamarack River
  - West Savanna River
  - Swan River, 60 mi-long (97 km)
  - Prairie River
    - West Fork Prairie River
  - Vermillion River
  - Deer River
  - Ball Club River
  - Leech Lake River
    - Bear River
    - Leech Lake
      - Boy River
        - Swift River
      - Shingobee River
      - Kabekona River
        - Necktie River
      - Steamboat River
  - First River
  - Pigeon River
  - Third River
  - Turtle River
    - North Turtle River
    - Gull River
  - Schoolcraft River, 30 mi-long (48 km)
  - Little Mississippi River

=== Hudson Bay drainage basin ===
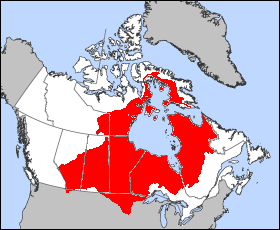
Hudson Bay drainage basin

The Red River of the North is the second longest river flowing through Minnesota. It forms the border with North Dakota and flows north to Manitoba, Canada.

- Nelson River (Manitoba, Canada), 644 km-long (400 mi)
  - Lake Winnipeg (Manitoba, Canada)
    - Winnipeg River (Manitoba, Canada), 235 km-long (146 mi)
      - Lake of the Woods
    - Red River of the North (Manitoba, Minnesota, North Dakota), 550 mi-long (890 km)

==== Red River of the North drainage basin ====
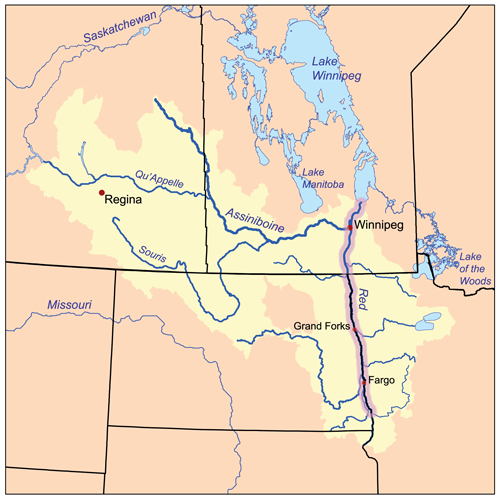
Red River of the North drainage basin

- Red River of the North (Manitoba, Minnesota, North Dakota) (length: 550 mi (890 km), 457.1 mi (735.6 km) in Minnesota
  - Roseau River (Manitoba, Minnesota), 214 mi-long (344 km)
    - Lost River
    - South Fork Roseau River
  - Joe River (Manitoba, Minnesota), 15.2 mi-long (24.5 km)
  - Two Rivers, 7.0 mi-long (11.3 km)
    - North Branch Two Rivers
      - Little Joe River
    - South Branch Two Rivers
      - Middle Branch Two Rivers
  - Tamarac River, 82.1 mi-long (132.1 km)
  - Snake River, 91.0 mi-long (146.5 km)
    - Middle River
    - South Branch Snake River
  - Grand Marais Creek, 41.1 mi-long (66.1 km)
  - Red Lake River, 193 mi-long (311 km)
    - Gentilly River
    - Black River
      - Little Black River
    - Clearwater River, 147 mi-long (237 km)
      - Lost River
        - Poplar River
        - Hill River
    - Thief River, 40.3 mi-long (64.9 km)
      - Lost River
      - Mud River
      - Moose River
    - Red Lake
      - Sandy River
      - Mud River
      - Blackduck River
        - North Cormorant River
        - South Cormorant River
      - Battle River
        - North Branch Battle River
        - South Branch Battle River
      - Tamarac River
        - Little Tamarac River
        - Lost River
  - Sand Hill River, 101 mi-long (163 km)
  - Marsh River, 49.9 mi-long (80.3 km)
  - Wild Rice River, 183 mi-long (295 km)
    - South Branch Wild Rice River
    - White Earth River
  - Buffalo River, 139 mi-long (224 km)
    - South Branch Buffalo River
  - Otter Tail River, 192 mi-long (309 km)
    - Pelican River
    - Dead River
    - Toad River
    - Egg River
  - Bois de Sioux River, 41 mi-long (66 km)
    - Rabbit River
      - South Fork Rabbit River
    - Mustinka River, 68 mi-long (109 km)
      - Twelvemile Creek
        - West Branch Twelvemile Creek
        - West Fork Twelvemile Creek
        - East Fork Twelvemile Creek

==== Lake of the Woods drainage basin ====
- Lake of the Woods
  - Warroad River
    - East Branch Warroad River
    - West Branch Warroad River
  - Rainy River, 137 mi-long (220 km)
    - Winter Road River
    - Baudette River
      - West Fork Baudette River
    - Rapid River
      - East Fork Rapid River
        - Barton Brook
        - Wing River
      - North Branch Rapid River
    - Black River
      - West Fork Black River
      - South Fork Black River
    - Big Fork River, 168 mi-long (270 km)
      - Bear River
      - Sturgeon River
      - Rice River
      - Popple River
        - Dunbar River
      - Bowstring River
        - Turtle River
    - Little Fork River, 160 mi-long (260 km)
      - Beaver Brook
      - Cross River
        - Deer River
      - Ester Brook
      - Nett Lake River
        - Lost River
      - Rapid River
      - Valley River
      - Willow River
      - Sturgeon River
        - Bear River
          - Bearskin River
        - Dark River
        - East Branch Sturgeon River
        - Shannon River
      - Rice River
    - Rainy Lake/Kabetogama Lake/Namakan Lake/Crane Lake
      - Rat Root River
        - East Branch Rat Root River
      - Ash River, 29 mi (47 km)
        - Black Duck River
      - Moose River
      - Johnson River
      - Vermilion River, 42.3 mi-long (68.1 km)
        - Pelican River
          - Elbow River
        - Vermilion Lake
          - Armstrong River
          - East Two River
          - West Two River
          - Pike River
            - Sand River
      - Echo River
        - Hunting Shack River
      - Loon River
        - Little Indian Sioux River
          - Little Pony River
          - Korb River
      - Namakan River (Ontario)
        - Lac la Croix/Crooked Lake
          - Hustler River
          - Boulder River
            - Dahlgren River
              - Stuart River
            - Nina Moose River
              - Oyster River
              - Moose River
              - Portage River
          - Bottle River
          - Beartrap River
          - Basswood River
            - Horse River
            - Basswood Lake/Fall Lake
              - Range River
              - Shagawa River
                - Burntside River
                  - Dead River
              - Bear Island River
                - Beaver River
              - Kawishiwi River
                - South Kawishiwi River
                  - Birch Lake
                    - Keeley Creek
                    - Birch River
                  - Isabella River
                    - Little Isabella River
                    - Island River
                      - Dumbbell River
                    - Perent River
                  - Snake River
                  - Stony River
                    - Sand River
                    - Greenwood River
                  - Dunka River
                - Little Saganaga Lake/Gillis Lake
                  - Frost River
                  - Chub River
                - Louse River
                - Phoebe River
              - Knife River
                - Knife Lake
          - Maligne River (Alberta)
            - Saganaga Lake
              - Sea Gull River
              - Granite River
                - Pine River
                  - Cross River
                    - Tucker River
                    - Long Island River

== Alphabetically ==
Below is a list of 514 of the 6,564 rivers in Minnesota in alphabetical order. Sections of rivers marked with an * have been designated trout streams by the Minnesota Department of Natural Resources.

Alphabetical list of rivers
A B C D E F G H I J K L M N O P Q R S T U V W X Y Z

A–C

- Ahmik River
- Ann River
- Armstrong River
- Artichoke River
- Ash River*
- Ashley Creek
- Badger Creek*
- Ball Club River
- Baptism River*
- Barton Brook
- Basswood River
- Battle Creek
- Battle River
- Baudette River
- Bear Creek
- Bear Island River
- Bear River (Big Fork River tributary)
- Bear River (Leech Lake River tributary)
- Bear River (Sturgeon River tributary)
- Bearskin River
- Beartrap River
- Beaver Brook, tributary of Little Fork River
- Beaver Creek (Big Sioux River tributary)
- Beaver Creek (Des Moines River tributary)
- Beaver River (Bear Island River tributary)
- Beaver River (Cloquet River tributary)
- Beaver River (Lake Superior)*
- Belle Creek (Cannon River tributary)*
- Big Fork River
- Big Sucker Creek
- Big Trout Creek (Winona County)
- Birch River
- Black Duck River
- Black River (Rainy River tributary)
- Black River (Red Lake River tributary)
- Blackduck River
- Blackhoof River*
- Blue Earth River
- Blueberry River
- Bois de Sioux River
- Bottle River
- Boulder River
- Bowstring River
- Boy River
- Brown's Creek (St. Croix River tributary)*
- Brule River*
- Buffalo Creek
- Buffalo River
- Bullard Creek*
- Burntside River
- Camp Creek (Root River tributary)*
- Canfield Creek*
- Cannon River
- Caribou River*
- Cascade River*
- Cat River
- Cedar River
- Chippewa River
- Chub River
- Clearwater River (Mississippi River tributary)
- Clearwater River (Red Lake River tributary)
- Cloquet River*
- Cobb River
- Cottonwood River
- Credit River
- Crocodile River
- Crooked Creek (Mississippi River tributary)
- Crooked Creek (Houston County, Minnesota)*
- Cross River (Gunflint Lake)
- Cross River (Lake Superior)*
- Cross River (Little Fork River tributary)
- Crow River
- Crow Wing River

Alphabetical list of rivers
A B C D E F G H I J K L M N O P Q R S T U V W X Y Z

D–H

- Dahlgren River
- Dark River
- Dead Moose River
- Dead River (Burntside River tributary)
- Dead River (Otter Tail River tributary)
- Deer River (Cross River tributary)
- Deer River (Mississippi River tributary)
- Des Moines River
- Devil Track River*
- Diversion Creek
- Dumbbell River
- Dunbar River
- Dunka River
- East River
- East Branch Baptism River
- East Branch Beaver River*
- East Branch Blue Earth River
- East Branch Chippewa River
- East Branch Rat Root River
- East Branch Rock River
- East Branch Sturgeon River
- East Branch Warroad River
- East Fork Des Moines River
- East Fork Rapid River
- East Fork Twelvemile Creek
- East Savanna River
- East Split Rock River
- East Swan River*
- East Two River (St. Louis River tributary)
- East Two River (Vermilion Lake)
- Echo River
- Egg River
- Elbow River
- Elk River
- Elm Creek
- Embarrass River
- Encampment River*
- Ester Brook
- Fall River*
- First River
- Fish Hook River
- Flandreau Creek
- Floodwood River
- Flute Reed River*
- French River
- Frost River
- Garvin Brook
- Gentilly River
- Gooseberry River*
- Grand Marais Creek
- Granite River
- Greenwood River (Brule River tributary)*
- Greenwood River (Stony River tributary)
- Grindstone River
- Groundhouse River
- Gull River (Crow Wing River tributary)
- Gull River (Turtle River tributary)
- Hawk Creek
- Hay Creek*
- Heron Lake Outlet
- High Island Creek
- Hill River (Lost River tributary)
- Hill River (Willow River tributary)
- Horse River
- Hunting Shack River
- Hustler River

Alphabetical list of rivers
A B C D E F G H I J K L M N O P Q R S T U V W X Y Z

I–L

- Isabella River
- Island River
- Jack Creek
- Joe River
- Johnson River
- Kabekona River
- Kadunce River
- Kawishiwi River
- Keeley Creek
- Kelso River
- Kettle River (Blueberry River tributary)
- Kettle River (Minnesota), tributary of St. Croix River
- Kimball Creek
- Knife River (Lake Superior)*
- Knife River, tributary of Birch Lake
- Knife River (Snake River tributary)
- Korb River
- Lac qui Parle River
- Langley River
- Le Sueur River
- Leaf River
- Leech Lake River
- Lester River*
- Lime Creek (Des Moines River tributary)
- Lime Creek (Winnebago River tributary)
- Little Ann River
- Little Black River
- Little Cannon River (Cannon River tributary)*
- Little Cannon River (Sabre Lake)
- Little Cedar River (Dodge County, Minnesota), a tributary of the Cedar River entirely in Dodge County
- Little Cedar River (Iowa and Minnesota), a tributary of the Cedar River rising in Mower County, Minnesota
- Little Chippewa River
- Little Cloquet River
- Little Cobb River
- Little Cottonwood River
- Little Devil Track River
- Little Elk River
- Little Fork River
- Little Gooseberry River
- Little Hill River
- Little Indian Sioux River
- Little Iowa River
- Little Isabella River*
- Little Joe River
- Little Knife River (Lake County, Minnesota)
- Little Knife River (St. Louis County, Minnesota)
- Little Langley River
- Little Le Sueur River
- Little Manitou River*
- Little Marais River
- Little Minnesota River
- Little Mississippi River
- Little Net River*
- Little Nokasippi River
- Little Partridge River
- Little Pine River
- Little Pony River
- Little River
- Little Rock River
- Little Sioux River
- Little Stewart River*
- Little Sucker River
- Little Swan River
- Little Tamarac River
- Little Tamarack River
- Little Trout Valley (Winona County)*
- Little Two River
- Little Whiteface River (North), located east of Meadowlands
- Little Whiteface River (South), located south of Meadowlands
- Little Willow River (Mississippi River tributary)
- Little Willow River (Willow River tributary)
- Long Island River
- Long Prairie River
- Loon River
- Lost River (Clearwater River tributary)
- Lost River (Nett Lake)
- Lost River (Roseau River tributary)
- Lost River (Tamarac River tributary)
- Lost River (Thief River tributary)
- Louse River
- Lower Stump River
- Lower Tamarack River

Alphabetical list of rivers
A B C D E F G H I J K L M N O P Q R S T U V W X Y Z

M–O

- Manitou River*
- Maple River
- Marsh River
- McCarty River
- Middle River
- Middle Branch Blue Earth River
- Middle Branch Root River*
- Middle Branch Rush River
- Middle Branch Two Rivers
- Middle Fork Crow River
- Middle Fork Whitewater River*
- Middle Fork Zumbro River
- Midway River*
- Mike Drew Brook
- Minnesota River
- Mississippi River
- Money Creek (Root River tributary)*
- Moose Horn River
- Moose River (Namakan Lake)
- Moose River (Nina Moose River tributary)
- Moose River (Thief Lake)
- Moose River (Willow River tributary)
- Mud River (Red Lake)
- Mud River (Thief River tributary)
- Mustinka River
- Necktie River
- Nemadji River*
- Net River*
- Nett Lake River
- Nina Moose River
- Nokasippi River
- North River
- North Branch Battle River
- North Branch Cascade River
- North Branch Grindstone River
- North Branch Middle Fork Zumbro River
- North Branch Rapid River
- North Branch Root River*
- North Branch Rush River
- North Branch Sunrise River
- North Branch Two Rivers
- North Branch Upper Iowa River
- North Branch Whiteface River
- North Branch Yellow Medicine River
- North Cannon River
- North Cormorant River
- North Fork Crooked Creek
- North Fork Crow River
- North Fork Watab River
- North Fork Watonwan River
- North Fork Whitewater River*
- North Fork Willow River
- North Fork Yellow Bank River
- North Fork Zumbro River
- North Turtle River
- North Two River
- Ocheyedan River
- Okabena Creek
- Onion River*
- Otter River
- Otter Tail River
- Oyster River

Alphabetical list of rivers
A B C D E F G H I J K L M N O P Q R S T U V W X Y Z

P–R

- Paleface River
- Partridge River (Crow Wing River tributary)
- Partridge River (St. Louis River tributary)
- Pelican River (Otter Tail River tributary)
- Pelican River (Vermilion River tributary)
- Perch Creek
- Perent River
- Phoebe River
- Pigeon River (Minnesota–Ontario), tributary of Lake Superior
- Pigeon River (Mississippi River tributary)
- Pike River
- Pine Creek (Mississippi River tributary)
- Pine Creek (Upper Iowa River tributary)
- Pine Creek (Rush Creek tributary)*
- Pine River (Kettle River tributary)
- Pine River (Minnesota–Ontario), tributary of Granite River
- Pine River (Mississippi River tributary)
- Pine River (Saint Louis River tributary)*
- Pipestone Creek
- Platte River
- Plum Creek
- Pokegama River
- Pomme de Terre River
- Poplar River (Lake Superior)*
- Poplar River (Lost River tributary)
- Popple River
- Portage River (Fish Hook River tributary)
- Portage River (Moose Horn River tributary)
- Portage River (Nina Moose River tributary)
- Potato River
- Prairie River (Big Sandy Lake)
- Prairie River (Mississippi River tributary)
- Rabbit River (Bois de Sioux)
- Rabbit River (Mississippi River tributary)
- Rainy River
- Range River
- Rapid River (Little Fork River tributary)
- Rapid River (Rainy River tributary)
- Rat Root River
- Red Lake River
- Red River
- Red River of the North
- Redeye River
- Redwood River
- Reservation River
- Rice Creek
- Rice River (Big Fork River tributary)
- Rice River (Little Fork River tributary)
- Rice River (Mississippi River tributary)
- Riceford Creek*
- Ripple River
- Rock River
- Rollingstone Creek*
- Root River
- Roseau River
- Royal River
- Rum River
- Rush Creek (Root River tributary)*
- Rush River

Alphabetical list of rivers
A B C D E F G H I J K L M N O P Q R S T U V W X Y Z

S

- St. Croix River
- St. Francis River
- St. Louis River
- Sand Creek (Minnesota River tributary)
- Sand Creek (St. Croix River tributary)
- Sand Hill River
- Sand River (Pike River tributary)
- Sand River (Stony River tributary)
- Sandy River (Mississippi River tributary)
- Sandy River (Red Lake)
- Sauk River
- Sawbill Creek
- Schoolcraft River
- Sea Gull River
- Shagawa River
- Shakopee Creek
- Shannon River
- Shell River
- Shell Rock River
- Shingobee River
- Skunk Creek
- Skunk River (Crow River tributary)
- Skunk River (Platte River tributary)
- Sleepy Eye Creek
- Snake River (Elk River tributary)
- Snake River (Isabella River tributary)
- Snake River (Red River of the North tributary)
- Snake River (St. Croix River tributary)
- South Branch Battle River
- South Branch Buffalo River
- South Branch Grindstone River
- South Branch Little Elk River
- South Branch Manitou River*
- South Branch Middle Fork Zumbro River
- South Branch Partridge River
- South Branch Root River*
- South Branch Rush River
- South Branch Snake River
- South Branch Sunrise River
- South Branch Two Rivers
- South Branch Vermillion River
- South Branch Whiteface River
- South Branch Wild Rice River
- South Branch Yellow Medicine River
- South Brule River
- South Cormorant River
- South Kawishiwi River
- South Fork Black River
- South Fork Crooked Creek
- South Fork Crow River
- South Fork Groundhouse River
- South Fork Nemadji River
- South Fork Pine River
- South Fork Rabbit River
- South Fork Root River*
- South Fork Roseau River
- South Fork Watab River
- South Fork Watonwan River
- South Fork Whitewater River*
- South Fork Willow River
- South Fork Yellow Bank River
- South Fork Zumbro River
- South Two River
- Split Rock River (tributary of Lake Superior)*
- Split Rock River (Kettle River tributary)
- Spring Creek
- Spring Branch Swan River
- Spring Valley Creek (Fillmore and Mower Counties)*
- Stanchfield Creek
- Steamboat River
- Stewart River*
- Stony River
- Straight River (central Minnesota) (tributary of Fish Hook River)
- Straight River (southern Minnesota) (tributary of Cannon River)*
- Stuart River
- Stump River
- Sturgeon River (Big Fork River tributary)
- Sturgeon River (Little Fork River tributary)
- Sunrise River
- Swamp River
- Swan River (central Minnesota)
- Swan River (northern Minnesota)
- Swift River

Alphabetical list of rivers
A B C D E F G H I J K L M N O P Q R S T U V W X Y Z

T–Z

- Tait River
- Talmadge River*
- Tamarac River (Red Lake)
- Tamarac River (Red River of the North tributary)
- Tamarack River
- Temperance River*
- Thief River
- Third River
- Thompson Creek (Root River tributary)*
- Toad River
- Trout Brook (Anoka and Wright Counties)
- Trout Brook (Dakota and Goodhue Counties)*
- Trout Brook (Pine County)
- Trout Brook (Ramsey County, Minnesota)
- Trout Brook (Wabasha County, Minnesota)*
- Trout Brook, Mazeppa Creek (Wabasha and Goodhue Counties)*
- Trout Brook (Washington County, Minnesota)*
- Trout Creek (Todd County)
- Trout Creek (Itasca County)
- Trout Creek (Winona County)
- Trout Ponds Creek (Winona)*
- Trout Run (Winona County, Whitewater Watershed)*
- Trout Run (Filmore and Winona Counties)*
- Tucker River
- Turtle River (Bowstring River tributary)
- Turtle River (Mississippi River tributary)
- Twelvemile Creek
- Two Island River*
- Two River (Mississippi River tributary)
- Two Rivers (Red River of the North tributary)
- Upper Iowa River
- Upper Tamarack River
- Us-kab-wan-ka River*
- Valley Creek
- Valley River
- Vermilion River (St. Louis County)
- Vermillion River (Cass County)
- Vermillion River (Scott, Dakota and Goodhue Counties)*
- Vern River
- Wapsipinicon River
- Warroad River
- Watab River
- Watonwan River
- Watson Creek (Minnesota)*
- Wells Creek
- West Branch Baptism River
- West Branch Beaver River
- West Branch Blue Earth River
- West Branch Cloquet River
- West Branch Floodwood River
- West Branch Kettle River
- West Branch Knife River
- West Branch Lac qui Parle River
- West Branch Onion River
- West Branch Rum River
- West Branch St. Francis River
- West Branch Sunrise River
- West Branch Twelvemile Creek
- West Branch Warroad River
- West Fork Baudette River
- West Fork Black River
- West Fork Groundhouse River
- West Fork Little Sioux River
- West Fork Moose Horn River
- West Fork Prairie River
- West Fork Twelvemile Creek
- West Savanna River
- West Split Rock River
- West Swan River
- West Two River (St. Louis River tributary)
- West Two River (Vermilion Lake)
- Whetstone River
- White Earth River
- Whiteface River
- Whitewater River*
- Wild Rice River
- Wildcat Creek (Minnesota)*
- Whitney Brook
- Willow River (Kettle River tributary)
- Willow River (Little Fork River tributary)
- Willow River (Mississippi River tributary)
- Wing River (Leaf River tributary)
- Wing River (Rapid River tributary)
- Winnebago Creek*
- Winter Road River
- Wisel Creek*
- Yellow Bank River
- Yellow Medicine River
- Zumbro River

== See also ==
- Category:Rivers of Minnesota by county
- List of lakes in Minnesota
- List of longest streams of Minnesota
