= West Swan River =

- Mouth of the West Swan River

Location
- Country: United States
- State: Minnesota
- County: St. Louis County

Physical characteristics
- Source
  - location: Keewatin
  - coordinates: 47.4135444°N 93.0076909°W
- Mouth
  - location: Little Swan
  - coordinates: 47°15′04″N 92°49′06″W
- Length: 42.2-mile-long (67.9 km)

Basin features
- River system: Saint Louis River

The West Swan River is a 42.2-mile-long (67.9 km) tributary of the East Swan River of Minnesota, flowing to the Saint Louis River and eventually Lake Superior. The West Swan River flows into and out of Snowshoe Lake and Kelly Lake west of Hibbing. Presently there are problems with flowage, due to obstructions in the river. The mines that have polluted the river have left it facing severe problems.

== See also ==
- List of rivers of Minnesota
