= Little Marais River =

- Mouth of the Little Marais River

Location
- Country: United States
- State: Minnesota
- County: Lake County

Physical characteristics
- Source
  - location: Finland, Minnesota
  - coordinates: 47.4590761°N 91.112381°W
- Mouth
  - location: Little Marais, Minnesota
  - coordinates: 47.4143559°N 91.0990503°W

The Little Marais River is a river in Lake County, Minnesota.

== See also ==
- List of rivers of Minnesota
