= Turtle River (Bowstring River tributary) =

Coordinates: 47°32′39″N 93°45′52″W

Location
- Country: United States

Physical characteristics
- Source
  - location: Minnesota

The Turtle River is a river of Minnesota. It is a tributary of the Bowstring River.

== See also ==
- List of rivers of Minnesota
