= Joe River (Minnesota) =

Coordinates: 49.049988°N 97.2003362°W

Location
- Country: United States; Canada

Physical characteristics
- Source
  - location: Minnesota
- Mouth
  - location: Manitoba

The Joe River is a 15.2-mile-long (24.5 km) tributary of the Red River of the North that flows through Minnesota in the United States and Manitoba in Canada. Via the Red River, Lake Winnipeg, and the Nelson River, it is part of the Hudson Bay watershed.

== See also ==
- List of rivers of Minnesota
- List of rivers of Manitoba
