= Boy River (Leech Lake) =

Coordinates: 47.1816215°N 94.2210778°W

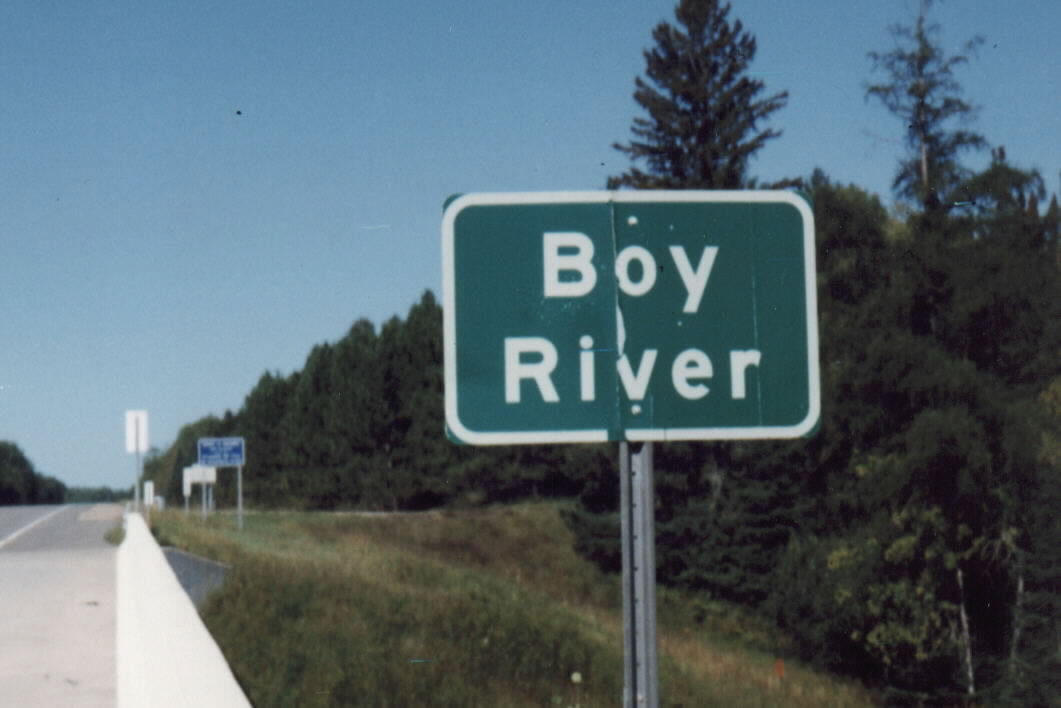
- Native name: Gwiiwizensiwi-ziibi (Ojibwe)

Location
- Country: United States

Physical characteristics
- Source
  - location: Minnesota

The Boy River is a river in Cass County, Minnesota. The river took its name from Boy Lake.

== See also ==
- List of rivers of Minnesota
