= Grand Marais Creek =

Coordinates: 48.0699820°N 97.0970192°W

Location
- Country: United States

Physical characteristics
- Source
  - location: Minnesota

Grand Marais Creek is a 41.1-mile-long (66.1 km) tributary of the Red River of the North in northwestern Minnesota, the United States. Via the Red River, Lake Winnipeg, and the Nelson River, it is part of the Hudson Bay watershed.

It flows from southeast to northwest, rising less than 0.5 miles (0.80 km) east of the Red Lake River and running parallel to it. The creek passes northeast of East Grand Forks and joins the Red River 7 miles (11 km) north of that city.

== See also ==
- List of rivers of Minnesota
