= Crooked Creek (Mississippi River tributary) =

- Mouth of Crooked Creek

Location
- Country: United States
- State: Minnesota
- County: Cass County

Physical characteristics
- Source
  - location: Crooked Lake
  - coordinates: 47.2255556°N 94.5763889°W
- Mouth
  - location: Steamboat Bay
  - coordinates: 47.2368999°N 94.5752652°W
- Length: 9.9-mile-long (15.9 km)

Basin features
- River system: Upper Mississippi River

Crooked Creek is a 9.9-mile-long (15.9 km) tributary of the Mississippi River in northwestern Minnesota.

== See also ==
- List of rivers of Minnesota
