= Elbow River (Minnesota) =

River in Minnesota, United States

Coordinates: 48.0293602°N 92.8246138°W

Location
- Country: United States

Physical characteristics
- Source
  - location: Minnesota

The Elbow River is a river in St. Louis County, Minnesota. It rises south of the Kabetogama State Forest and flows for approximately 9 miles before joining the Pelican River near Glendale.

== See also ==
- List of rivers of Minnesota
