= Little Black River (Minnesota) =

Location
- Country: United States

Physical characteristics
- Source
  - location: Minnesota
- Mouth
  - elevation: 940 feet (290 m)
- Length: 4.5 mi (7.2 km)

The Little Black River is a 4.5-mile-long (7.2 km) river in Wylie Township, in northwestern Red Lake County, Minnesota. From its source (47°57′36″N 96°27′00″W) — Goose Lake Swamp in the Pembina State Wildlife Management Area — the river runs south and southeast to the Black River, a tributary of the Red Lake River. Its waters ultimately drain via Canada's Nelson River into Hudson Bay.

== See also ==
- List of rivers of Minnesota
