= Blackhoof River =

Blackhoof Rivere
- Mouth of the Blackhoof River

Location
- Country: United States
- State: Minnesota
- County: Carlton County

Physical characteristics
- Source
  - location: Atkinson, Minnesota
  - coordinates: 46.6160559°N 92.579916°W
- Mouth: North Fork Nemadji River
  - location: Wrenshall, Minnesota
  - coordinates: 46.5188321°N 92.3976940°W
- Length: 26.3-mile-long (42.3 km)

Basin features
- Progression: Blackhoof River→ Nemadji River→ Lake Superior
- River system: Nemadji River

The Blackhoof River is a 26.3-mile-long (42.3 km) tributary of the North Fork Nemadji River in Carlton County, Minnesota, United States, flowing via the Nemadji River to Lake Superior.

"Black hoof" is the English translation of the native Ojibwe language name.

== Course ==
The Blackhoof's source is near the town of Atkinson, Minnesota. It flows through Ellston Lake, which is an impoundment of the river. The Blackhoof River is the largest tributary of the Nemadji River.

== Habitat ==
The Blackhoof River flows through the 4,025.9 acre Blackhoof Wildlife Management Area. Sections of the Blackhoof River have been designated as trout stream by the Minnesota Department of Natural Resoucrs. There are both steelhead and brook trout in the Blackhoof River.

== See also ==
- List of rivers of Minnesota
