= Little Joe River =

Coordinates: 48.8649831°N 96.9645003°W

Location
- Country: United States

Physical characteristics
- Source
  - location: Minnesota

The Little Joe River is a 9.4-mile-long (15.1 km) watercourse in northwestern Minnesota. It is a tributary of the north branch of the Two Rivers, which drains into the Red River of the North.

== See also ==
- List of rivers of Minnesota
