= Thompson Creek (Root River tributary) =

Coordinates: 43°45′58″N 91°20′36″W

- Location within Minnesota

Location
- Country: United States
- State: Minnesota
- County: Houston

Basin features
- River system: Root River

Thompson Creek is a stream in Houston County, in the U.S. state of Minnesota. It is a tributary to the Root River.

Thompson Creek was named for brothers Edward Thompson and Clark W. Thompson, early settlers.

== See also ==
- List of rivers of Minnesota
