= Little Whiteface River (South) =

Location
- Country: United States

Physical characteristics
- Source
  - location: Minnesota
- Mouth
  - coordinates: 46.9807747°N 92.8065872°W

The Little Whiteface River (South) is a 4.4-mile-long (7.1 km) river of Minnesota and the southern of two tributaries of the Whiteface River with the same name.

== See also ==
- List of rivers of Minnesota
