= Kimball Creek (Minnesota) =

- Mouth of Kimball Creek

Location
- Country: United States
- State: Minnesota

Physical characteristics
- Source
  - location: Grand Marais, Minnesota
  - coordinates: 47.8623897°N 90.2537085°W
- Mouth
  - location: Lake Superior
- Length: 8.9-mile-long (14.3 km)

Kimball Creek is an 8.9-mile-long (14.3 km) stream in northeastern Minnesota, the United States. It is a tributary of Lake Superior.

Kimball Creek was named for Charles G. Kimball, an explorer who drowned in Lake Superior near the creek.

== See also ==
- List of rivers of Minnesota
