= Oyster River (Minnesota) =

Coordinates: 48°12′16″N 92°05′01″W

Location
- Country: United States

Physical characteristics
- Source
  - location: Minnesota

The Oyster River is a river in north-eastern Minnesota, located in St. Louis County, approximately 25 miles (40 km) north of McComber, Minnesota.

== See also ==
- List of rivers of Minnesota
