= Wisel Creek =

- Location within Minnesota

Location
- Country: United States
- State: Minnesota
- County: Fillmore

Physical characteristics
- Source
  - coordinates: 43.5485772°N 91.9462686°W -->
- Mouth
  - coordinates: 43°37′32.34″N 91°49′38.14″W
  - elevation: 886 ft (270 m)

Wisel Creek is a stream in Fillmore County, in the U.S. state of Minnesota.

Wisel Creek was named for David Weisel, a pioneer who built two mills near its mouth in the 1850s.

Portions of Wisel Creek are designated by the Minnesota Department of Natural Resources as a trout stream.

== See also ==
- List of rivers of Minnesota
