= Shagawa River =

Coordinates: 47°55′48″N 91°47′26″W

Location
- Country: United States

Physical characteristics
- Source
  - location: Minnesota

The Shagawa River is a river of Minnesota. The river flows through the east–central part of Morse Township in northern Saint Louis County.

== See also ==
- List of rivers of Minnesota
