= Dark River (Minnesota) =

Coordinates: 47.7121469°N 92.8540699°W

Location
- Country: United States

Physical characteristics
- Source
  - location: Minnesota

The Dark River is a DNR-designated trout stream located approximately 10 miles north of Chisholm, Minnesota. Anglers can expect to catch Brook Trout and the occasional Northern Pike.

== See also ==
- List of rivers of Minnesota
