= Range River =

River in the United States

Coordinates: 48°01′45″N 91°48′00″W

Location
- Country: United States

Physical characteristics
- Source
  - location: Minnesota
- Length: 6.4 mi

The Range River is a river of Minnesota. It begins in Low Lake and empties into Basswood Lake 6.4 miles away. It is known to have populations of Northern Pike.

== See also ==
- List of rivers of Minnesota
