= Beartrap River =

Coordinates: 48.2096205°N 91.9356881°W

Location
- Country: United States

Physical characteristics
- Source
  - location: Minnesota

The Beartrap River is a river of Minnesota.

== See also ==
- List of rivers of Minnesota
