= Kawishiwi River =

Coordinates: 47.9054553°N 91.7173594°W

Location
- Country: United States

Physical characteristics
- Source
  - location: Minnesota

The Kawishiwi River is a river of Minnesota.

Kawishiwi is a name derived from the Ojibwe language meaning "the river full of beavers' houses".

== See also ==
- List of rivers of Minnesota
