= Pelican River (Vermilion River tributary) =

Coordinates: 48.1658°N 92.5771°W

Location
- Country: United States

Physical characteristics
- Source
  - location: Minnesota

The Pelican River is a river of Minnesota. It is a tributary of the Vermilion River.

== See also ==
- List of rivers of Minnesota
