= Warroad River =

River in Minnesota, United States

Coordinates: 48°54′23″N 95°17′56″W

Location
- Country: United States

Physical characteristics
- Source
  - location: Minnesota

The Warroad River is a river flowing into Lake of the Woods. It has its mouth in the city of Warroad, Minnesota. The river is formed at the confluence of the East and West Branches Warroad Rivers, south of the city of Warroad, Minnesota.

== See also ==
- List of rivers of Minnesota
