= Whitney Brook =

Stream in Mille Lacs County, Minnesota, U.S.

Coordinates: 45°51′09″N 93°41′10″W

Whitney Brook is a stream in Mille Lacs County, in the U.S. state of Minnesota.

Whitney Brook bears the name of a local lumberman.

== See also ==
- List of rivers of Minnesota
