= Knife River (Minnesota–Ontario) =

River in Canada and US

Coordinates: 48.0698928°N 91.3334470°W

Location
- Country: United States

Physical characteristics
- Source
  - location: Minnesota

The Knife River (Minnesota–Ontario) is a river of Minnesota and Ontario.

== See also ==
- List of rivers of Minnesota
