= Ashley Creek (Minnesota) =

Coordinates: 45.7569094°N 94.9661336°W

Location
- Country: United States

Physical characteristics
- Source
  - location: Minnesota

Ashley Creek is a 28.3-mile-long (45.5 km) tributary of the Sauk River in central Minnesota, United States, joining the Sauk just north of Sauk Centre. It is part of the Mississippi River watershed.

Ashley Creek was named in the 1850s for Ossian Doolittle Ashley, a Boston stockbroker.

== See also ==
- List of rivers of Minnesota
