= Little Sucker River =

Coordinates: 46.9271581°N 91.8346253°W

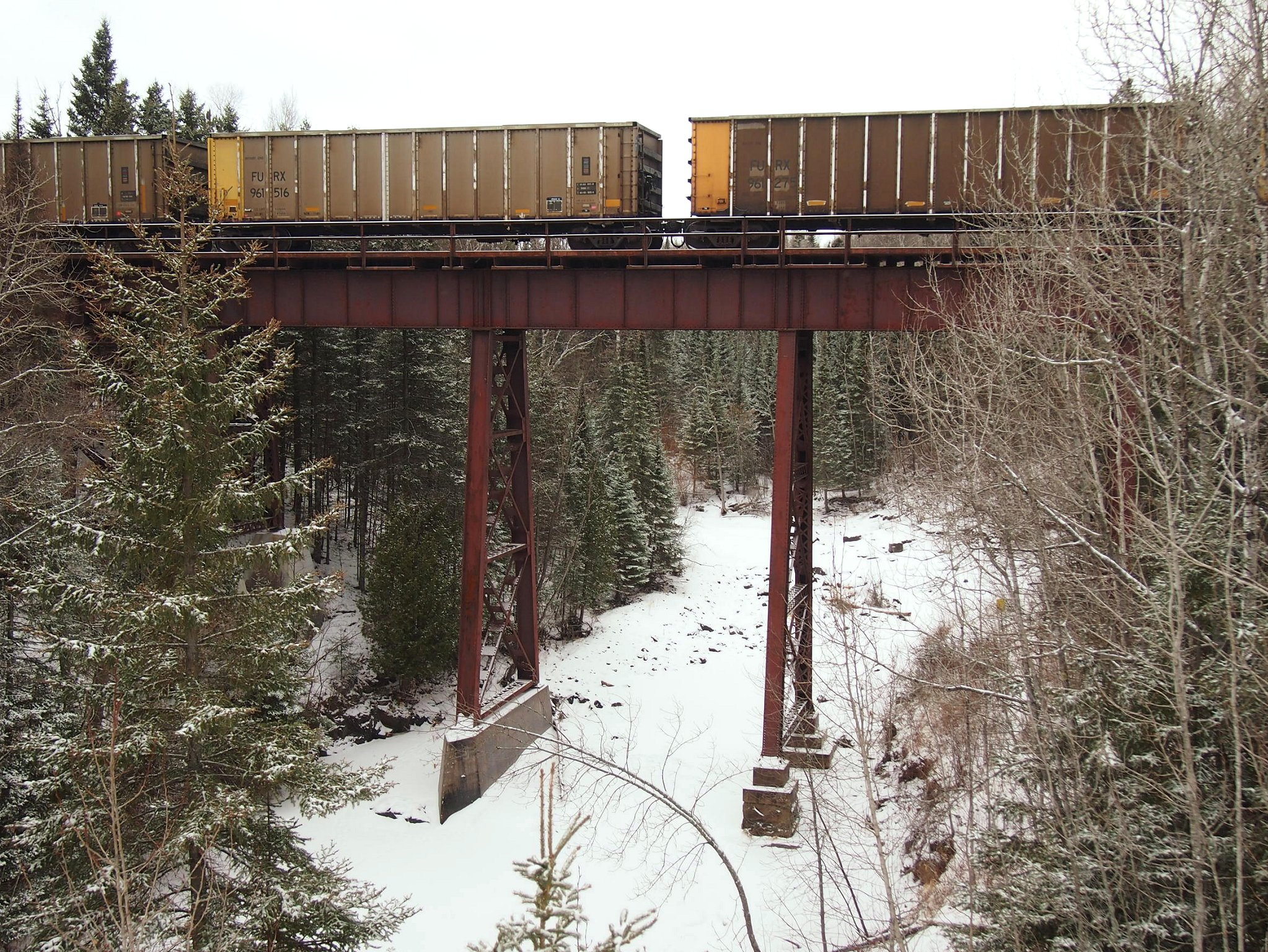
- A railway bridge over the Little Sucker River

Location
- Country: United States

Physical characteristics
- Source
  - location: Minnesota
- Mouth
  - location: Lake Superior
- Length: 1.6 mi (2.6 km)

The Little Sucker River is a 1.6-mile-long (2.6 km) stream in St. Louis County, Minnesota, flowing directly into Lake Superior.

== See also ==
- List of rivers of Minnesota
