= Battle River (Minnesota) =

Coordinates: 47.9596807°N 94.7427558°W

- Native name: Miigaadiwin-ziibiing (Ojibwe)

Location
- Country: United States

Physical characteristics
- Source
  - location: Minnesota

The Battle River is a 2.7-mile-long (4.3 km) tributary of Red Lake in Minnesota, the United States. It is formed by the junction of its North and South branches. The North Branch flows east to west for 13.7 miles (22.0 km) entirely in Beltrami County, and the South Branch flows 40.1 miles (64.5 km), starting at the outlet of Bartlett Lake in Koochiching County and flowing west-northwest into Beltrami County.

The name of Battle River commemorates a battle between the Ojibwe and the Sioux.

== See also ==
- List of rivers of Minnesota
