= Perch Creek (Watonwan River tributary) =

- Mouth of Perch Creek

Location
- Country: United States
- State: Minnesota
- Counties: Blue Earth, Watonwan, Martin

Physical characteristics
- Source
  - coordinates: 43.8044001°N 94.4730254°W
- Mouth
- Length: 37.3 mi-long (60.0 km)

Basin features
- Progression: Perch Creek→ Watonwan River→ Blue Earth River→ Minnesota River→ Mississippi River→ Gulf of Mexico
- River system: Minnesota River

Perch Creek is a 37.3-mile-long (60.0 km) tributary of the Watonwan River in southern Minnesota, United States. Via the Watonwan, Blue Earth, and Minnesota rivers, it is part of the Mississippi River watershed.

== See also ==
- List of rivers of Minnesota
- List of longest streams of Minnesota
