= Kabekona River (Leech Lake) =

Coordinates: 47.1449566°N 94.6683312°W

Location
- Country: United States

Physical characteristics
- Source
  - location: Minnesota

The Kabekona River is a river of Minnesota. It empties into the Kabekona Bay of Leech Lake.

== See also ==
- List of rivers of Minnesota
