= Wells Creek (Minnesota) =

- Mouth of Wells Creek

Location
- Country: United States
- State: Minnesota

Physical characteristics
- Source
  - location: Goodhue, Minnesota
  - coordinates: 44.3841334°N 92.5693558°W
- Mouth
  - location: Frontenac, Minnesota
  - coordinates: 44°30′56″N 92°19′6″W
- Length: 27.6 m (91 ft)

Basin features
- River system: Mississippi River

Wells Creek is a 27.6-mile-long (44.4 km) tributary of the Mississippi River in Wabasha and Goodhue counties in Minnesota, United States. It enters the Mississippi at Old Frontenac.

Wells Creek was named for James "Bully" Wells, an early settler.

== See also ==
- List of rivers of Minnesota
