= Bottle River =

Coordinates: 48.2473985°N 91.9801334°W

Location
- Countries: United States; Canada

Physical characteristics
- Source
  - location: Minnesota

The Bottle River is a river that forms part of the Canada–United States border between Minnesota and Ontario.

== See also ==
- List of rivers of Minnesota
