= Wildcat Creek (Minnesota) =

Stream in Houston County, Minnesota, U.S.

Coordinates: 43°41′22″N 91°16′38″W

Wildcat Creek is a stream in Houston County, in the U.S. state of Minnesota.

Wildcat Creek was named for the cougars once frequent in the area.

== See also ==
- List of rivers of Minnesota
