= Nett Lake River =

Coordinates: 48°13′53″N 93°29′6″W

Location
- Country: United States

Physical characteristics
- Source
  - location: Minnesota

The Nett Lake River is a river of Minnesota.

== See also ==
- List of rivers of Minnesota
