= East Two River (Vermilion Lake) =

Coordinates: 47.8082524°N 92.2934949°W

Location
- Country: United States

Physical characteristics
- Source
  - location: Minnesota

The East Two River (Vermilion Lake) is a river of Minnesota.

== See also ==
- List of rivers of Minnesota
