= Johnson River (Minnesota) =

Coordinates: 48.4043505°N 92.6748782°W

Location
- Country: United States

Physical characteristics
- Source
  - location: Minnesota

The Johnson River is a river of Minnesota.

== See also ==
- List of rivers of Minnesota
