= Sandy River (Mississippi River tributary) =

Coordinates: 46°47′23″N 93°19′40″W

Location
- Country: United States

Physical characteristics
- Source
  - location: Minnesota

The Sandy River is a river of Minnesota. It is a tributary of the Mississippi River.

== See also ==
- List of rivers of Minnesota
