= Moose River (Willow River tributary) =

Coordinates: 46°53′20″N 93°33′21″W

Location
- Country: United States

Physical characteristics
- Source
  - location: Minnesota

The Moose River is a river of Minnesota. It is a tributary of the Willow River.

== See also ==
- List of rivers of Minnesota
