= Mud River (Red Lake) =

Coordinates: 47.88301°N 94.90582°W

Location
- Country: United States

Physical characteristics
- Source
  - location: Minnesota

The Mud River is a 23.1-mile-long (37.2 km) tributary of Red Lake in northwestern Minnesota in the United States.

== See also ==
- List of rivers of Minnesota
