= Red River (St. Louis River tributary) =

- Mouth of the Red River

Location
- Country: United States
- State: Minnesota, Wisconsin
- Counties: Douglas County, Carlton County

Physical characteristics
- Source
  - location: Frogner
  - coordinates: 46.6188315°N 92.3496371°W
- Mouth
  - location: west of Oliver, Wisconsin
  - coordinates: 46.6486295°N 92.2365764°W
- Length: 10.6 mi-long (17.1 km)

The Red River is a 10.6-mile-long (17.1 km) river of Minnesota and Wisconsin flowing to the St. Louis River southwest of Duluth and Superior near Oliver, Wisconsin.

== See also ==
- List of rivers of Minnesota
- List of rivers of Wisconsin
