= Popple River (Minnesota) =

Coordinates: 47°43′18″N 94°4′19″W

Location
- Country: United States

Physical characteristics
- Source
  - location: Minnesota

The Popple River (Minnesota) is a river of Minnesota.

== See also ==
- List of rivers of Minnesota
