= Keeley Creek =

Coordinates: 47.7690756°N 91.7518154°W

Location
- Country: United States

Physical characteristics
- Source
  - location: Minnesota
  - elevation: 1,421 feet (433 m)
- Mouth
  - location: Birch Lake

The Keeley Creek is a river of Minnesota. It empties into Birch Lake in the Bear Island State Forest in St. Louis County, Minnesota.

== See also ==
- List of rivers of Minnesota
