= Bear River (Big Fork River tributary) =

Coordinates: 48.4552275°N 93.7198892°W

Location
- Country: United States

Physical characteristics
- Source
  - location: Minnesota

The Bear River (Big Fork River) is a river of Minnesota. It is a tributary of the Big Fork River.

== See also ==
- List of rivers of Minnesota
