= Basswood River =

Coordinates: 48.1137832°N 91.7112370°W

Location
- Countries: United States; Canada

Physical characteristics
- Source
  - location: Minnesota

The Basswood River is a river that forms part of the Canada–United States border between Minnesota and Ontario.

== See also ==
- List of rivers of Minnesota
