= Lost River (Roseau River tributary) =

Coordinates: 48°55′14″N 95°37′29″W

Location
- Country: United States

Physical characteristics
- Source
  - location: Minnesota

The Lost River is a tributary of the Roseau River in northern Minnesota in the United States. Via the Roseau River, the Red River of the North, Winnipeg Lake, and the Nelson River, it is part of the Hudson Bay watershed.

== See also ==
- List of rivers of Minnesota
