= Korb River =

Coordinates: 47.9843487°N 92.0520857°W

Location
- Country: United States

Physical characteristics
- Source
  - location: Minnesota

The Korb River is a river of Minnesota.

== See also ==
- List of rivers of Minnesota
