= Kadunce River =

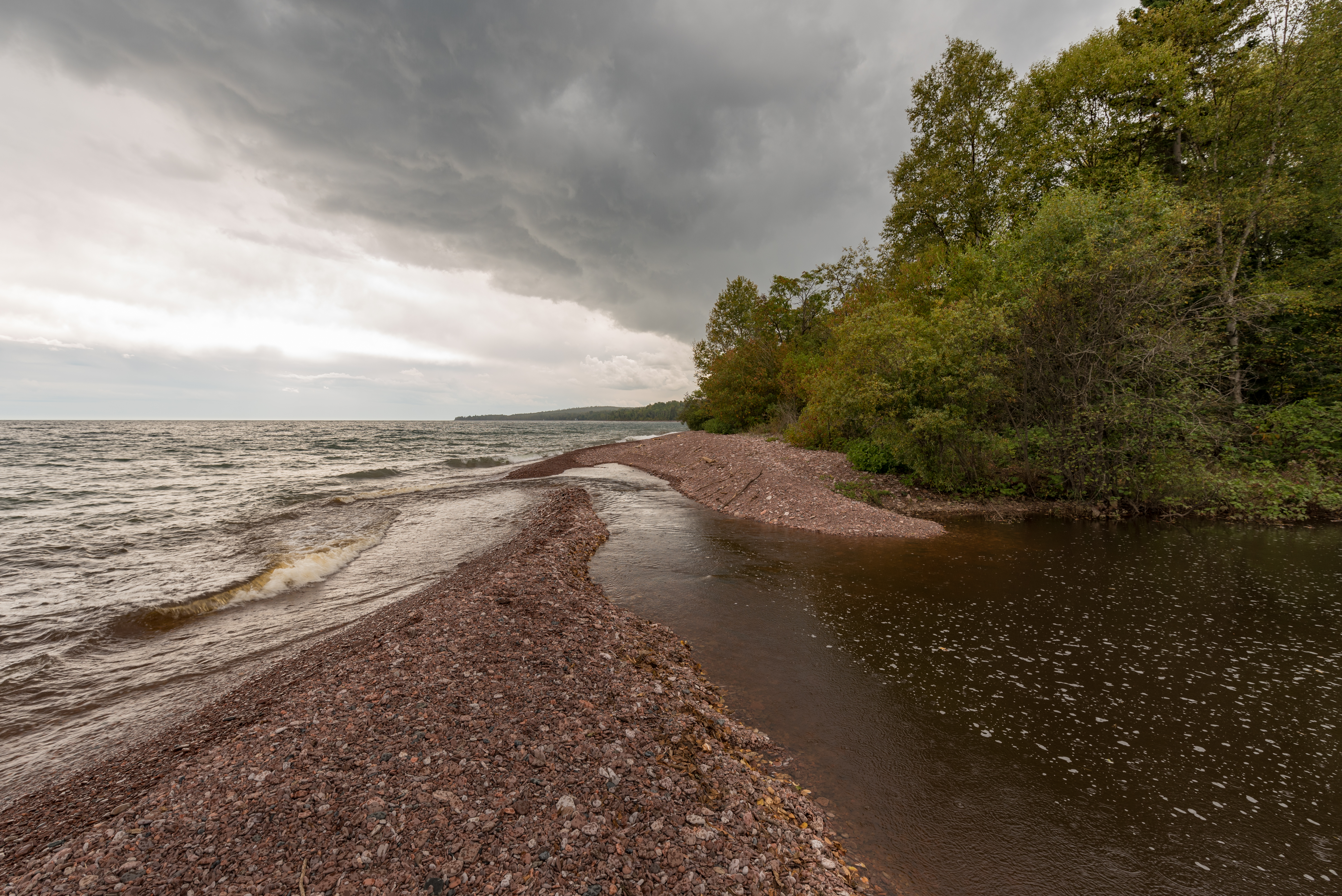
- The Kadunce flowing into Lake Superior

Location
- Country: United States
- State: Minnesota
- County: Cook County

Physical characteristics
- Source
  - coordinates: 47.8644444°N 90.2058333°W
- Mouth
  - location: Lake Superior
  - coordinates: 47.7935027°N 90.1548215°W
- Length: 8.5 miles (13.7 km)

The Kadunce River is an 8.5-mile-long (13.7 km) stream in northeastern Minnesota, the United States, flowing into Lake Superior.

== See also ==
- List of rivers of Minnesota
