= Little Manitou River =

- Mouth of the Little Manitou River

Location
- Country: United States
- State: Minnesota
- County: Lake County

Physical characteristics
- Source
  - location: Little Marais
  - coordinates: 47.4713889°N 91.0675°W
- Mouth
  - location: Lake Superior
  - coordinates: 47.4549085°N 91.0479372°W
- Length: 1.8-mile-long (2.9 km)

The Little Manitou River is a 1.8-mile-long (2.9 km) stream in Lake County, Minnesota. It flows directly into Lake Superior.

== See also ==
- List of rivers of Minnesota
