= Necktie River =

Coordinates: 47°15′25″N 94°41′42″W

Location
- Country: United States

Physical characteristics
- Source
  - location: Minnesota

The Necktie River is a river of Minnesota.

== See also ==
- List of rivers of Minnesota
