= Two Island River =

- Mouth of the Two Island River

Location
- Country: United States
- State: Minnesota
- County: Cook County, Lake County

Physical characteristics
- Source
  - location: Cramer, Minnesota
  - coordinates: 47.6074027°N 91.0476481°W
- Mouth
  - location: Schroeder, Minnesota, Lake Superior
  - coordinates: 47°31′26″N 90°55′19″W
- Length: 15.0-mile-long (24.1 km)

The Two Island River is a 15.0-mile-long (24.1 km) river in northeastern Minnesota, the United States. It flows into Lake Superior at Taconite Harbor.

Two Island River was named for the two lake islands near its mouth.

== See also ==
- List of rivers of Minnesota
