= Pokegama River (St. Louis River tributary) =

Coordinates: 46°40′53″N 92°09′15″W

- Mouth of the Pokegama River

Location
- Country: United States

Physical characteristics
- Source
  - location: Minnesota
- Length: 26.3 mi-long (42.3 km)

The Pokegama River is a 26.3-mile-long (42.3 km) river in Wisconsin and Minnesota in the United States. It is a tributary of the Saint Louis River, joining it in the western part of the city of Superior, Wisconsin.

== See also ==
- List of rivers of Minnesota
