= Little Devil Track River =

- Mouth of Little Devil Track River

Location
- Country: United States
- State: Minnesota
- County: Cook County

Physical characteristics
- Source
  - location: Devil Track Lake
  - coordinates: 47.7873909°N 90.4167755°W -->
- Mouth
  - location: Grand Marais, Minnesota
  - coordinates: 47.7829465°N 90.3012140°W
- Length: 6.1-mile-long (9.8 km)

The Little Devil Track River is a 6.1-mile-long (9.8 km) stream in northeastern Minnesota, the United States. It is a tributary of the Devil Track River and flows west to east, north of the city of Grand Marais.

== See also ==
- List of rivers of Minnesota
