= Frost River =

Coordinates: 47.9904474°N 90.9178926°W

Location
- Country: United States

Physical characteristics
- Source
  - location: Minnesota

The Frost River is a river of Minnesota.

== See also ==
- List of rivers of Minnesota
