= Fall River (Minnesota) =

Fall River Rose Bush River
- Mouth of the Fall River
- Native name: Oginekan (Ojibwe)

Location
- Country: United States
- State: Minnesota

Physical characteristics
- Source
  - location: Grand Marais, Minnesota
  - coordinates: 47.7715578°N 90.3703849°W
- Mouth
  - location: Good Harbor Bay, Lake Superior
  - coordinates: 47.7407250°N 90.3889988°W
- Length: 3.3-mile-long (5.3 km)

The Fall River is a 3.3-mile-long (5.3 km) stream in northeastern Minnesota, the United States. It drops 860 feet (260 m) in elevation to Lake Superior over the final 2.2 miles (3.5 km) of its course.

== See also ==
- List of rivers of Minnesota
