= Little Gooseberry River =

Coordinates: 47.1977044°N 91.6468403°W

Location
- Country: United States

Physical characteristics
- Source
  - location: Minnesota

The Little Gooseberry River is a 4.8-mile-long (7.7 km) river in Lake County, Minnesota, United States. It is a tributary of the Gooseberry River.

== See also ==
- List of rivers of Minnesota
