= Little Cloquet River =

Coordinates: 47.0963214°N 92.0187934°W

- Mouth of the Little Cloquet River

Location
- Country: United States

Physical characteristics
- Source
  - location: Minnesota

The Little Cloquet River is a 7.6-mile-long (12.2 km) river located in southern Saint Louis County, Minnesota, United States. It is a tributary of the Cloquet River.

The Little Cloquet River flows through North Star Township and Marion Lake Unorganized Territory, located north of Duluth.

== See also ==
- List of rivers of Minnesota
