= Cross River (Gunflint Lake) =

- Mouth of the Cross River

Location
- Country: United States
- State: Minnesota
- County: Cook County

Physical characteristics
- Source
  - location: Long Island Lake
  - coordinates: 48.0727778°N 90.8297222°W
- Mouth
  - location: Long Island Lake
  - coordinates: 48.0935005°N 90.7717770°W

The Cross River (Gunflint Lake) is a river of Minnesota.

== See also ==
- Gunflint Lodge, beside Gunflint Lake and on the Gunflint Trail
- Gunflint Range
- List of rivers of Minnesota
