= Hunting Shack River =

Coordinates: 48.1840725°N 92.4307104°W

Location
- Country: United States

Physical characteristics
- Source
  - location: Minnesota

The Hunting Shack River is a river of Minnesota.

== See also ==
- List of rivers of Minnesota
