= Lime Creek (Des Moines River tributary) =

- Mouth of the Lime Creek

Location
- Country: United States
- State: Minnesota
- County: Murray

Physical characteristics
- Source
  - location: Avoca, Minnesota
  - coordinates: 43.9449636°N 95.6638987°W
- Mouth
  - location: Lime Creek, Minnesota
  - coordinates: 43.9574627°N 95.5213937°W
- Length: 28.6-mile-long (46.0 km)

Basin features
- River system: Des Moines River

Lime Creek is a 28.6-mile-long (46.0 km) waterway of Minnesota and tributary of the Des Moines River.

Lime Creek was named from the limestone rock on the creek bed.

== See also ==
- List of rivers of Minnesota
