= Swift River (Minnesota) =

Coordinates: 47°04′57″N 94°04′15″W

Location
- Country: United States

Physical characteristics
- Source
  - location: Minnesota

The Swift River (Minnesota) is a river of Minnesota.

== See also ==
- List of rivers of Minnesota
