= Island River =

Coordinates: 47.8012901°N 91.3498564°W

Location
- Country: United States

Physical characteristics
- Source
  - location: Minnesota

The Island River is a river of Minnesota.

== See also ==
- List of rivers of Minnesota
