= Little River (Saint Louis River tributary) =

- Mouth of the Little River

Location
- Country: United States
- State: Minnesota

Physical characteristics
- Source
  - location: Esko
  - coordinates: 46.6825°N 92.3402778°W
- Mouth
  - location: Saint Louis River
  - coordinates: 46.6688311°N 92.3096367°W
- Length: 2.1 mi-long (3.4 km)

The Little River is a 2.1-mile-long (3.4 km) stream in Carlton County, Minnesota, United States. It is a tributary of the Saint Louis River.

== See also ==
- List of rivers of Minnesota
