= Little Iowa River =

- Mouth of the Little Iowa River

Location
- Country: United States
- State: Minnesota
- County: Mower

Physical characteristics
- Source
  - location: Ostrander, Minnesota
  - coordinates: 43.6077421°N 92.4501727°W
- Mouth
  - location: Le Roy, Minnesota
  - coordinates: 43.5277430°N 92.5201758°W
- Length: 9.4-mile-long (15.1 km)

Basin features
- River system: Mississippi River

The Little Iowa River is a 9.4-mile-long (15.1 km) tributary of the Upper Iowa River in southeastern Minnesota.

== See also ==
- List of rivers of Minnesota
