= Portage River (Moose Horn River tributary) =

Coordinates: 46°27′08″N 92°44′38″W

Location
- Country: United States

Physical characteristics
- Source
  - location: Minnesota

The Portage River is an 8.8-mile-long (14.2 km) tributary of the Moose Horn River in eastern Minnesota, United States. It flows west to the Moose Horn River, joining it at Moosehead Lake next to the city of Moose Lake. By the Moose Horn River, its waters flow to the Kettle River, St. Croix River, and ultimately the Mississippi River. Just to the east of the Portage River, Nemadji Creek flows east to the Nemadji River, a tributary of Lake Superior and part of the Saint Lawrence River basin.

The Portage River was on an old portage route, hence the name.

== See also ==
- List of rivers of Minnesota
