= Perent River =

Coordinates: 47°48′35″N 91°16′05″W

Location
- Country: United States

Physical characteristics
- Source
  - location: Minnesota

The Perent River is a river of Minnesota.

== See also ==
- List of rivers of Minnesota
