= Dunbar River =

Coordinates: 47.6249534°N 94.2060591°W

Dunbar River (Popple River)

Location
- Country: United States

Physical characteristics
- Source
  - location: Minnesota

The Dunbar River (Popple River) is a river of Minnesota.

== See also ==
- List of rivers of Minnesota
