= Paleface River =

Location
- Country: United States

Physical characteristics
- Source
  - location: Minnesota
- Mouth
  - coordinates: 47°10′41″N 92°29′51″W

The Paleface River is a 26.0-mile-long (41.8 km) tributary of the Whiteface River in Saint Louis County, Minnesota, United States. The Paleface River is approximately 50 miles (80 km) inland from Lake Superior. The banks are heavily wooded with old birch and pine trees.

== See also ==
- List of rivers of Minnesota
