= Greenwood River (Brule River tributary) =

Coordinates: 47.9210001°N 90.1637056°W

- Mouth of Greenwood River

Location
- Country: United States

Physical characteristics
- Source
  - location: Minnesota

The Greenwood River is a tributary of the Brule River of Minnesota in the United States. It rises at the outlet of Greenwood Lake and flows south 7.1 miles (11.4 km) to the Brule River.

It was formerly called Diarrhea River, because it was supposed drinking its water caused diarrhea.

There are both brook trout and smallmouth bass present in the Greenwood River.

== See also ==
- List of rivers of Minnesota
