= Cross River (Little Fork River tributary) =

Coordinates: 48.3404958°N 93.4890475°W

Location
- Country: United States

Physical characteristics
- Source
  - location: Minnesota

The Cross River is a river of Minnesota. It is a tributary of the Little Fork River.

== See also ==
- List of rivers of Minnesota
