= Gentilly River (Minnesota) =

River of Minnesota, United States

Coordinates: 47.7999700°N 96.4647804°W

Location
- Country: United States

Physical characteristics
- Source
  - location: Minnesota

The Gentilly River is an 8.5-mile-long (13.7 km) tributary of the Red Lake River of Minnesota in the United States. Via the Red Lake River, the Red River of the North, Lake Winnipeg, and the Nelson River, it is part of the Hudson Bay watershed.

== See also ==
- List of rivers of Minnesota
