= Crocodile River (Minnesota) =

River in north-eastern Minnesota, US

- Mouth of the Crocodile River

Location
- Country: United States
- State: Minnesota
- County: Cook County

Physical characteristics
- Source
  - location: Crocodile Lake
  - coordinates: 48.0363889°N 90.2508333°W
- Mouth
  - location: Bearskin
  - coordinates: 48.0343322°N 90.2814820°W

The Crocodile River is a short river in the Boundary Water Canoe Area of Cook County, Minnesota. It originates in Crocodile Lake and runs to Bearskin.

== See also ==
- List of rivers of Minnesota
