= Miller Creek (Saint Louis River tributary) =

Stream in St. Louis County, Minnesota, U.S.

Coordinates: 46°47′56.89″N 92°9′47.45″W

Miller Creek is a stream in St. Louis County, in the U.S. state of Minnesota. It is a tributary of the Saint Louis River.

Miller Creek was named for Robert P. Miller, an officer during the Civil War.

== See also ==
- List of rivers of Minnesota
