= Little Stewart River =

Coordinates: 47.0546541°N 91.6401763°W

Location
- Country: United States

Physical characteristics
- Source
  - location: Minnesota

The Little Stewart River is an 8.9-mile-long (14.3 km) river in Lake County, Minnesota, United States. It is a tributary of the Stewart River.

== See also ==
- List of rivers of Minnesota
