= North Turtle River =

Coordinates: 47°32′06″N 94°34′41″W

Location
- Country: United States

Physical characteristics
- Source
  - location: Minnesota

The North Turtle River is a river of Minnesota.

== See also ==
- List of rivers of Minnesota
