= Little Cedar River (Dodge County, Minnesota) =

- Mouth of the Little Cedar River

Location
- Country: United States
- State: Minnesota
- County: Dodge County

Physical characteristics
- Source
  - location: Hayfield, Minnesota
  - coordinates: 43.9305192°N 92.905193°W
- Mouth
  - location: Waltham, Minnesota
  - coordinates: 43.8691300°N 92.9999178°W
- Length: 10.5-mile-long (16.9 km)

Basin features
- River system: Cedar River, Mississippi River

The Little Cedar River is a 10.5-mile-long (16.9 km) tributary of the Cedar River in Dodge County, Minnesota.

== See also ==
- List of rivers of Minnesota
