= Reservation River =

- Mouth of the Reservation River

Location
- Country: United States
- State: Minnesota
- County: Cook County

Physical characteristics
- Source
  - location: Swamp Lake
  - coordinates: 47.9487768°N 89.8556473°W
- Mouth
  - location: Lake Superior
  - coordinates: 47°52′29″N 89°51′32″W
- Length: 6.9 miles (11.1 km)
- Discharge
  - location: Lake Superior

The Reservation River is a river of Minnesota. It lies in the far northeast corner of the state, near the border with Canada. It flows 6.9 miles (11.1 km) from Swamp Lake on the western edge of the Grand Portage Indian Reservation south to Lake Superior.

== See also ==
- List of rivers of Minnesota
