= Little Pony River =

Coordinates: 48.0851825°N 92.2131957°W

Location
- Country: United States

Physical characteristics
- Source
  - location: Minnesota

The Little Pony River is a river of Minnesota.

== See also ==
- List of rivers of Minnesota
