= Deer River (Mississippi River tributary) =

- Mouth of the Deer River

Location
- Country: United States
- State: Minnesota
- County: Itasca County

Physical characteristics
- Source
  - location: Little Bowstring Lake
  - coordinates: 47.388835°N 93.7077116°W
- Mouth
  - location: Deer River, Minnesota
  - coordinates: 47.3146709°N 93.7793843°W

The Deer River is a river of Minnesota. It is a tributary of the Mississippi River.

Deer River is an English translation of the native Ojibwe-language name.

== See also ==
- List of rivers of Minnesota
