= Wing River (Rapid River tributary) =

Coordinates: 48°33′29″N 94°21′42″W

Location
- Country: United States

Physical characteristics
- Source
  - location: Minnesota

The Wing River is a river of Minnesota. It is a tributary of the Rapid River.

== See also ==
- List of rivers of Minnesota
