= Otter River (Minnesota) =

Coordinates: 47°02′50″N 92°12′12″W

- Mouth of the Otter River

Location
- Country: United States

Physical characteristics
- Source
  - location: Minnesota

The Otter River is a short connecting stream in Minnesota, flowing from Boulder Lake Reservoir into Island Lake Reservoir. The stream's length is 0.17 miles (0.27 km). It is within the Cloquet River watershed, north of Duluth.

== See also ==
- List of rivers of Minnesota
