= Rice River (Big Fork River tributary) =

Coordinates: 47°44′52″N 93°39′07″W

Location
- Country: United States

Physical characteristics
- Source
  - location: Minnesota

The Rice River is a river of Minnesota. It is a tributary of the Big Fork River. It begins its course at Mud Lake, Minnesota and flows largely to the west through Norman County and Mahnomen County. The river is then joined by its two largest tributaries, the South Fork of the Wild Rice and the White Earth River just before converging with the Red River of the North.

== See also ==
- List of rivers of Minnesota
