= Pine River (Kettle River tributary) =

Coordinates: 46°15′36″N 92°51′44″W

Location
- Country: United States

Physical characteristics
- Source
  - location: Minnesota

The Pine River is a 23.0-mile-long (37.0 km) tributary of the Kettle River in eastern Minnesota, United States. It begins at the outlet of Big Pine Lake near the western border of Pine County, Minnesota, and flows northeast and east, reaching the Kettle River at Rutledge.

== See also ==
- List of rivers of Minnesota
