= Armstrong River (Minnesota) =

Coordinates: 47.8538035°N 92.1712643°W

Location
- Country: United States

Physical characteristics
- Source
  - location: Minnesota

The Armstrong River is a river of Minnesota.

Armstrong River was named for a mining prospector.

== See also ==
- List of rivers of Minnesota
