= Ball Club River =

Coordinates: 47.3241180°N 93.8857768°W

Location
- Country: United States

Physical characteristics
- Source
  - location: Minnesota

The Ball Club River is a river of Minnesota.

== See also ==
- List of rivers of Minnesota
