= Vern River =

- Mouth of Vern River

Location
- Country: United States
- State: Minnesota
- County: Cook County

Physical characteristics
- Source
  - location: Brule Lake
  - coordinates: 47.8904474°N 90.6998408°W
- Mouth
  - location: Cherokee Lake
  - coordinates: 47.9137810°N 90.7873420°W
- Length: 4.0-mile-long (6.4 km)

The Vern River is a 4.0-mile-long (6.4 km) stream in northern Minnesota, the United States. It is a tributary of the Temperance River and flows entirely within the Boundary Waters Canoe Area Wilderness of Superior National Forest.

== See also ==
- List of rivers of Minnesota
