= Long Island River (Minnesota) =

Coordinates: 48.0087796°N 90.7876125°W

Location
- Country: United States

Physical characteristics
- Source
  - location: Minnesota

The Long Island River (Minnesota) is a river of Minnesota.

== See also ==
- List of rivers of Minnesota
