= Dahlgren River =

Coordinates: 48.2232327°N 92.0231914°W

Location
- Country: United States

Physical characteristics
- Source
  - location: Minnesota

The Dahlgren River is a river of Minnesota.

== See also ==
- List of rivers of Minnesota
