= North Cormorant River =

River in the United States of America

Coordinates: 47.92329°N 94.73164°W

Location
- Country: United States

Physical characteristics
- Source
  - location: Minnesota

The North Cormorant River is a 39.1-mile-long (62.9 km) tributary of the Blackduck River of Minnesota in the United States. It joins the Blackduck River shortly upstream of that river's mouth at Red Lake, the largest natural lake entirely within Minnesota.

== See also ==
- List of rivers of Minnesota
