= Bear River (Leech Lake River tributary) =

Coordinates: 47.2218992°N 93.9813404°W

Location
- Country: United States

Physical characteristics
- Source
  - location: Minnesota

The Bear River (Leech Lake River) is a river of Minnesota. It is a tributary of the Leech Lake River.

== See also ==
- List of rivers of Minnesota
