= Little Two River =

Coordinates: 45.8305210°N 94.3561116°W

Location
- Country: United States

Physical characteristics
- Source
  - location: Minnesota

The Little Two River is a 15.9-mile-long (25.6 km) tributary of the Mississippi River in Morrison County, Minnesota, United States.

== See also ==
- List of rivers of Minnesota
