= Skunk Creek (Gooseberry River tributary) =

- Mouth of Skunk Creek

Location
- Country: United States

Physical characteristics
- Source
  - location: Two Harbors
  - coordinates: 47.2452023°N 91.5982274°W
- Mouth
  - location: Split Rock Point
  - coordinates: 47°09′18″N 91°29′25″W

Skunk Creek is a 12.3-mile-long (19.8 km) stream in Lake County, Minnesota, United States. It is a tributary of the Gooseberry River.

== See also ==
- List of rivers of Minnesota
