= Moose River (Thief Lake) =

Coordinates: 48.48108°N 95.83417°W

Location
- Country: United States

Physical characteristics
- Source
  - location: Minnesota

The Moose River is a 22.5-mile-long (36.2 km) tributary of Thief Lake in northwestern Minnesota, the United States. The outflow from Thief Lake drains via the Thief River, Red Lake River, Red River of the North, Lake Winnipeg, and the Nelson River to Hudson Bay.

== See also ==
- List of rivers of Minnesota
