= Shingobee River =

Coordinates: 47°02′22″N 94°34′25″W

Location
- Country: United States

Physical characteristics
- Source
  - location: Minnesota

The Shingobee River is a river in Cass and Hubbard counties, Minnesota.

Shingobee is a name derived from the Ojibwe word zhingob (combining form zhingobii-), referring to the balsam fir in Minnesota Ojibwe.

== See also ==
- List of rivers of Minnesota
