= South Kawishiwi River =

Coordinates: 47.8479608°N 91.7984779°W

Location
- Country: United States

Physical characteristics
- Source
  - location: Minnesota

The South Kawishiwi River is a river of Minnesota.

== See also ==
- List of rivers of Minnesota
