= Dumbbell River =

Coordinates: 47.7621231°N 91.2159703°W

Location
- Country: United States

Physical characteristics
- Source
  - location: Minnesota

The Dumbbell River is a river of Minnesota.

== See also ==
- List of rivers of Minnesota
