= Rabbit River (Bois de Sioux) =

Coordinates: 46.11218°N 96.56090°W

Location
- Country: United States

Physical characteristics
- Source
  - location: Minnesota

The Rabbit River is a 31.5-mile-long (50.7 km) tributary of the Bois de Sioux River of Minnesota in the United States. Via the Bois de Sioux River, Red River of the North, Lake Winnipeg, and the Nelson River, it is part of the Hudson Bay watershed.

The river was named for the varying hare, which is common in the area.

== See also ==
- List of rivers of Minnesota
