= Winter Road River =

Coordinates: 48°45′30″N 94°39′37″W

Location
- Country: United States

Physical characteristics
- Source
  - location: Minnesota

The Winter Road River is a river of Minnesota.

== See also ==
- List of rivers of Minnesota
