= Sleepy Eye Creek =

Coordinates: 44°15′12″N 94°46′22″W

Location
- Country: United States

Physical characteristics
- Source
  - location: Minnesota

Sleepy Eye Creek is a 51.8-mile-long (83.4 km) tributary of the Cottonwood River of Minnesota, the United States. Via the Cottonwood River, its water flows to the Minnesota River and eventually the Mississippi River.

Sleepy Eye Creek was named for Chief Sleepy Eye.

== See also ==
- List of rivers of Minnesota
