= Little Whiteface River (North) =

Location
- Country: United States

Physical characteristics
- Source
  - location: Minnesota
- Mouth
  - coordinates: 47.0763281°N 92.7029715°W

The Little Whiteface River (North) is an 8.8-mile-long (14.2 km) river of Minnesota and the northern of two tributaries of the Whiteface River with the same name.

== See also ==
- List of rivers of Minnesota
