= Little Hill River =

Coordinates: 46.9588410°N 93.6135636°W

Location
- Country: United States

Physical characteristics
- Source
  - location: Minnesota

The Little Hill River is a river of Minnesota.

== See also ==
- List of rivers of Minnesota
