= Lost River (Thief River tributary) =

Coordinates: 48.31497°N 95.93140°W

Location
- Country: United States

Physical characteristics
- Source
  - location: Minnesota

The Lost River is a 6.8-mile-long (10.9 km) watercourse in the Thief River watershed of western Minnesota in the United States. The stream is entirely in Marshall County, and it flows into the Agassiz National Wildlife Refuge, where it disappears into the large wetland complex surrounding Agassiz Pool, a lake which drains to the Thief River.

== See also ==
- List of rivers of Minnesota
