= Boulder River (Minnesota) =

Coordinates: 48.2348990°N 92.0070793°W

Location
- Country: United States

Physical characteristics
- Source
  - location: Minnesota

The Boulder River (Minnesota) is a river of Minnesota.

== See also ==
- List of rivers of Minnesota
