= Rapid River (Little Fork River tributary) =

Coordinates: 48°05′47″N 93°24′08″W

Location
- Country: United States

Physical characteristics
- Source
  - location: Minnesota

The Rapid River is a river of Minnesota. It is a tributary of the Little Fork River. located within the Rainy River watershed. The Little Fork River, flowing into the Rainy River, spans about 160 miles and includes smaller tributaries like the Rapid River.

== See also ==
- List of rivers of Minnesota
