= Sand Creek (St. Croix River tributary) =

Coordinates: 45°56′03″N 92°38′25″W

- Location of mouth

Location
- Country: United States
- State: Minnesota
- County: Pine County

Physical characteristics
- Length: 43.3 mi (69.7 km)

Basin features
- River system: St. Croix River

Sand Creek is a 43.3-mile-long (69.7 km) tributary of the St. Croix River in Pine County, eastern Minnesota, United States.

== See also ==
- List of rivers of Minnesota
