= Hustler River =

Lake in the state of Minnesota, United States

Coordinates: 48.2840678°N 92.1690300°W

Location
- Country: United States

Physical characteristics
- Source
  - location: Minnesota

The Hustler River is a river of Minnesota. Hustler Lake is a small body of water on the river and is one terminus of the Sioux–Hustler Trail.

== See also ==
- List of rivers of Minnesota
