= McCarty River =

Coordinates: 46°52′58″N 92°51′37″W

Location
- Country: United States

Physical characteristics
- Source
  - location: Minnesota

The McCarty River is a 6.8-mile-long (10.9 km) tributary of the Saint Louis River of Minnesota.

== See also ==
- List of rivers of Minnesota
