= Sea Gull River =

- Mouth of Sea Gull River

Location
- Country: United States
- State: Minnesota
- County: Cook County

Physical characteristics
- Source
  - location: Munker Island
  - coordinates: 48.1505556°N 90.8980556°W
- Mouth
  - location: Munker Island
  - coordinates: 48°11′56″N 90°52′46″W

The Sea Gull River is a river of Minnesota.

== See also ==
- List of rivers of Minnesota
