= Little Mississippi River (Minnesota) =

- Mouth of the Little Mississippi River

Location
- Country: United States
- State: Minnesota
- Counties: Beltrami, Clearwater

Physical characteristics
- Source
  - location: north of Daniel Lake
  - coordinates: 47.5782887°N 95.2586215°W
- Mouth
  - location: Moose Lake
  - coordinates: 47.4382868°N 95.0650096°W
  - elevation: 1,358 ft (414 m)
- Length: 14 mi (23 km)
- Basin size: 66.7 sq mi (173 km^{2})

Basin features
- Progression: Little Mississippi River→ Moose Lake→ Little Mississippi River→ Grant Creek→ Mississippi River
- River system: Mississippi River

The Little Mississippi River (Minnesota) is a river in Beltrami and Clearwater counties, Minnesota. It has also been called the Piniddiwin River.

== See also ==
- List of rivers of Minnesota
