= Mike Drew Brook =

Stream in Mille Lacs County, Minnesota, U.S.

Coordinates: 45°48′36″N 93°39′35″W

Mike Drew Brook is a stream in Mille Lacs County, in the U.S. state of Minnesota.

Mike Drew Brook bears the name of a local lumberman. Brook developed much of the land around the area on behalf of the lumber industry.

== See also ==
- List of rivers of Minnesota
