= Split Rock River (Kettle River tributary) =

Coordinates: 46°25′45″N 92°53′41″W

Location
- Country: United States

Physical characteristics
- Source
  - location: Minnesota

The Split Rock River is a 20.4-mile-long (32.8 km) tributary of the Kettle River in eastern Minnesota, United States. It begins at the outlet of Split Rock Lake in eastern Aitkin County and flows east into Carlton County, reaching the Kettle River 4 miles (6 km) south of the city of Kettle River.

Split Rock River was named from its steep, rocky banks.

== See also ==
- List of rivers of Minnesota
