= Stuart River (Minnesota) =

Coordinates: 48°10′41″N 92°00′01″W

Location
- Country: United States

Physical characteristics
- Source
  - location: Minnesota

The Stuart River is a river located in Minnesota, in the United States.

== See also ==
- List of rivers of Minnesota
