= First River (Minnesota) =

Coordinates: 47.4938410°N 94.0166082°W

Location
- Country: United States

Physical characteristics
- Source
  - location: Minnesota

The First River is a river of Minnesota. It joins Little Cut Foot Sioux Lake with First River Lake.

== See also ==
- List of rivers of Minnesota
