= Chub River =

Coordinates: 48.0760017°N 90.9456680°W

Location
- Country: United States

Physical characteristics
- Source
  - location: Minnesota

The Chub River is a river of Minnesota.

== See also ==
- List of rivers of Minnesota
