= Bearskin River =

Physical characteristics
- Mouth
  - location: 47.81733°N 93.06458°W

The Bearskin River is a river of Minnesota.

== See also ==
- List of rivers of Minnesota
