= Black Duck River (Minnesota) =

Coordinates: 48.3415799°N 92.9079363°W

Location
- Country: United States

Physical characteristics
- Source
  - location: Minnesota

The Black Duck River is a river of Minnesota.

== See also ==
- List of rivers of Minnesota
