= Snake River (Isabella River tributary) =

Coordinates: 47°47′22″N 91°32′08″W

Location
- Country: United States

Physical characteristics
- Source
  - location: Minnesota

The Snake River is a river of Minnesota. It is a tributary of the Isabella River.

== See also ==
- List of rivers of Minnesota
