= Little Indian Sioux River =

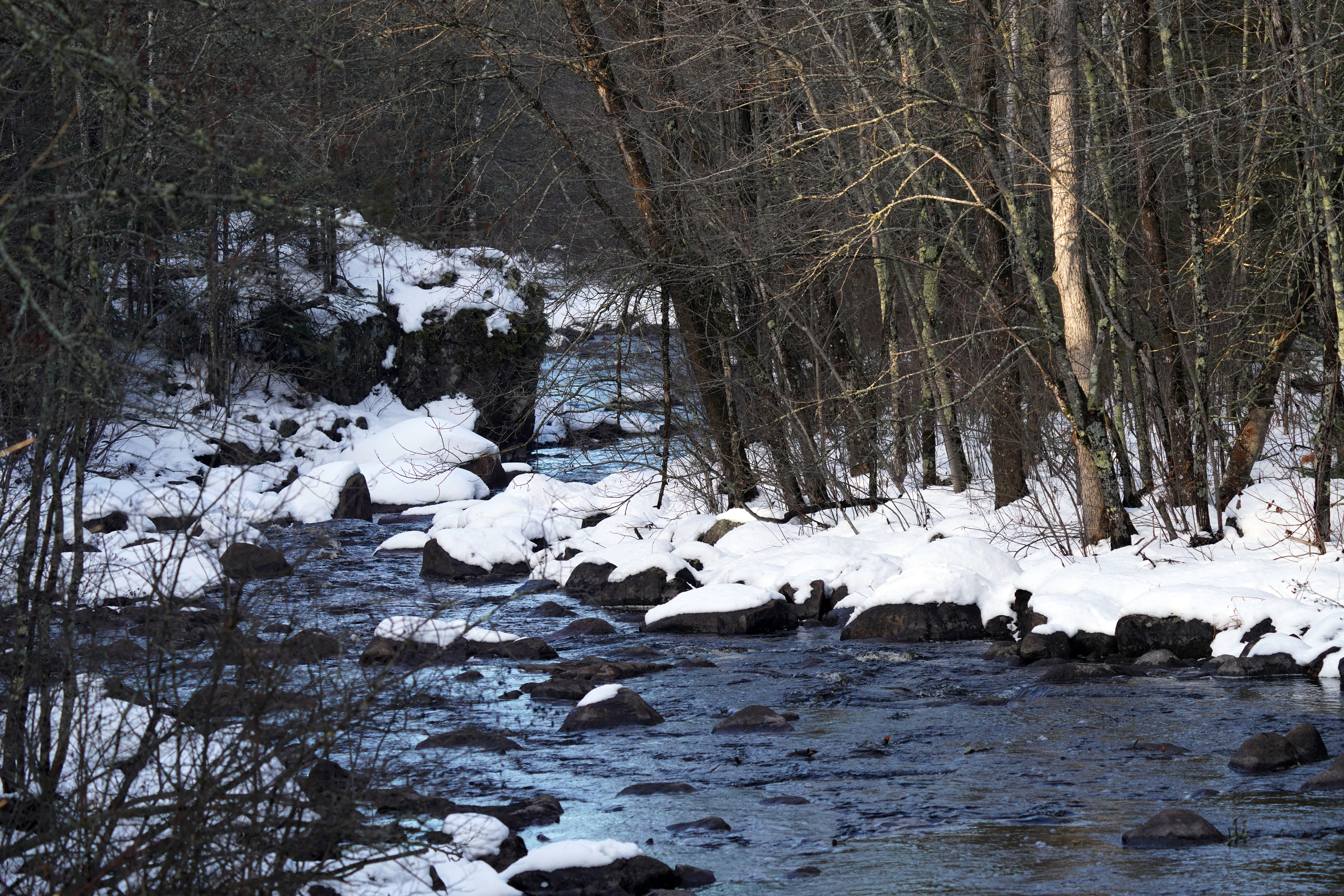

- Mouth

Location
- Country: United States
- State: Minnesota
- County: St. Louis

Physical characteristics
- Source
  - location: Chad Lake
  - coordinates: 47°59′35″N 92°09′04″W
  - elevation: 354 m (1,161 ft)
- Mouth
  - location: Lake Jeanette
  - coordinates: 48°14′15″N 92°15′34″W

The Little Indian Sioux River is a river in St. Louis County, Minnesota. It originates at Chad Lake and flows into Lake Jeanette in the Jeanette State Forest at its mouth.

== See also ==
- List of rivers of Minnesota
- List of longest streams of Minnesota
- Little Sioux River (in southern Minnesota and Iowa)
