= Badger Creek (Houston County, Minnesota) =

Creek in Houston County, Minnesota, USA

- Mouth of Badger Creek

Location
- Country: United States
- State: Minnesota
- County: Houston County

Physical characteristics
- Source
  - coordinates: 43.6602778°N 91.5119444°W
- Mouth
  - coordinates: 43.7374667°N 91.5551426°W

Basin features
- River system: South Fork Root River
- Tributaries
  - right: Swede Bottom Creek

Badger Creek is a stream in Houston County, in the U.S. state of Minnesota. It is a tributary of the South Fork Root River, which it meets east of Houston, Minnesota. Badger Creek was named for the badgers once common in the area.

== Habitat ==
According to the Minnesota Department of Natural Resources, the following fish species are present in Badger Creek: Brown trout, brook trout, white sucker, creek chub, southern redbelly dace, northern redbelly dace, blacknose dace, longnose dace, bluntnose minnow, fathead minnow, common shiner, bigmouth shiner, central stoneroller, black bullhead, burbot, green sunfish, orange spotted sunfish, Johnny darter, fantail darter, central mudminnow, and brook stickleback. Habitat improvement was completed in 1970 in the upper reaches of the Badger Crek.

== See also ==
- List of rivers of Minnesota
