= Moose River (Namakan Lake) =

Coordinates: 48°23′47″N 92°45′0″W

Location
- Country: United States

Physical characteristics
- Source
  - location: Minnesota

The Moose River (Namakan Lake) is a river of Minnesota.

== See also ==
- List of rivers of Minnesota
