= East River (Minnesota) =

- Mouth of the East River

Location
- Country: United States
- State: Minnesota
- County: Itasca County

Physical characteristics
- Source
  - location: Stingy Lake
  - coordinates: 47.5232652°N 93.0660217°W
- Mouth
  - location: Hartley Lake
  - coordinates: 47.5268793°N 93.2721377°W
- Length: 3.0 miles (4.8 km)

Basin features
- River system: Saint Louis River

The East River is a small headwaters tributary of the Saint Louis River in northern Minnesota, United States. The East River, 3.0 miles (4.8 km) long, flows (along with the North River) into Seven Beaver Lake, the source of the St. Louis River.|

== See also ==
- List of rivers of Minnesota
