= Dead River (Otter Tail River tributary) =

Coordinates: 46.4263490°N 95.6664342°W

Location
- Country: United States

Physical characteristics
- Source
  - location: Minnesota

The Dead River is a 17.5-mile-long (28.2 km) tributary of the Otter Tail River of Minnesota in the United States. It rises east of Dent and flows south through Dead Lake and Walker Lake to its mouth at Otter Tail Lake on the Otter Tail River.

The name Dead River commemorates a massacre of the Ojibwe Indians.

== See also ==
- List of rivers of Minnesota
