= Hill River (Willow River tributary) =

Coordinates: 46.9785628°N 93.6024512°W

Location
- Country: United States

Physical characteristics
- Source
  - location: Minnesota

The Hill River is a river of Minnesota. It is a tributary of the Willow River.

== See also ==
- List of rivers of Minnesota
