= Little Swan River (Minnesota) =

Coordinates: 45.9227430°N 94.6730697°W

Location
- Country: United States

Physical characteristics
- Source
  - location: Minnesota

The Little Swan River is a 13.9-mile-long (22.4 km) tributary of the Swan River of central Minnesota, United States. It is part of the Mississippi River watershed.

== See also ==
- List of rivers of Minnesota
