= Echo River =

River in the United States of America

Coordinates: 48.2721270°N 92.4637677°W

Location
- Country: United States

Physical characteristics
- Source
  - location: Minnesota

The Echo River is a river of Minnesota. The most popular species caught here are Smallmouth bass and Walleye.

== See also ==
- List of rivers of Minnesota
