= Toad River (Minnesota) =

Stream in Minnesota, U.S.

Coordinates: 46°38′23″N 95°30′45″W

Toad River is a stream in the U.S. state of Minnesota.

Toad River is an English translation of the native Ojibwe language name.

== See also ==
- List of rivers of Minnesota
