= West Two River (Vermilion Lake) =

Coordinates: 47°47′18.1″N 92°17′49.6″W

Location
- Country: United States

Physical characteristics
- Source
  - location: Minnesota

The West Two River (Vermilion Lake) is a river of Minnesota.

== See also ==
- List of rivers of Minnesota
