= Egg River =

Coordinates: 46.9891263°N 95.6147586°W

Location
- Country: United States

Physical characteristics
- Source
  - location: Minnesota

The Egg River is a 16-mile-long (26 km) tributary of the Otter Tail River of Minnesota in the United States. It flows through a chain of lakes in the Tamarac National Wildlife Refuge and the White Earth Indian Reservation in Becker County, Minnesota.

Egg River, as well as the Egg Lakes through which it flows, is an English translation of the original Ojibwe word for the stream and proximate habitat, once characterized as a nesting area for water-loving birds.

== See also ==
- List of rivers of Minnesota
