= Ahmik River =

River in Minnesota, United States

Physical characteristics
- Source
  - location: Fine Lakes Township, St. Louis County, Minnesota
  - coordinates: 46°48′56″N 92°52′11″W
  - elevation: 1,300 ft (400 m)
- Mouth
  - location: Confluence with the St. Louis River, St. Louis County, Minnesota
  - coordinates: 46°51′40″N 92°48′38″W
  - elevation: 1,217 ft (371 m)
- Length: 5.2 mi (8.4 km)

Basin features
- Progression: Ahmik River → St. Louis River → Lake Superior → Great Lakes → St. Lawrence River → Gulf of St. Lawrence
- GNIS ID: 660633

The Ahmik River is a 5.2-mile-long (8.4 km) tributary of the Saint Louis River of Minnesota, United States.

== See also ==
- List of rivers of Minnesota
