= Phoebe River =

Coordinates: 47°53′56″N 91°05′09″W

Location
- Country: United States

Physical characteristics
- Source
  - location: Minnesota

The Phoebe River is a river of Minnesota.

== See also ==
- List of rivers of Minnesota
