= Pigeon River (Mississippi River tributary) =

Coordinates: 47°30′41″N 94°09′34″W

Location
- Country: United States

Physical characteristics
- Source
  - location: Minnesota

The Pigeon River is a river of Minnesota. It is a tributary of the Mississippi River.

== See also ==
- List of rivers of Minnesota
