= Dunka River =

Coordinates: 47.7146368°N 91.8701556°W

Location
- Country: United States

Physical characteristics
- Source
  - location: Minnesota

The Dunka River is a river of Minnesota.

== See also ==
- List of rivers of Minnesota
