= Tucker River =

Coordinates: 48°03′36″N 90°43′33″W

Location
- Country: United States

Physical characteristics
- Source
  - location: Minnesota

The Tucker River is a river of Minnesota.

== See also ==
- List of rivers of Minnesota
