= Loon River =

Coordinates: 48.2590706°N 92.3929307°W

Location
- Countries: United States; Canada

Physical characteristics
- Source
  - location: Minnesota

The Loon River is a river that forms part of the Canada–United States border between Minnesota and Ontario. It is a tributary to Sand Point Lake (a part of Voyageurs National Park) and a path for motorized outfitters to ferry canoers into the Boundary Waters Canoe Area. The river is navigable from Sand Point Lake into Lac La Croix, however, boaters and outfitters must pass a hazardous area known as 56 Rapids (Fiftysix Rapids), which is impassable by power boaters at low water levels and contains numerous near-surface rocks when the lakes are at normal water levels, as well as two mechanized portages around both Loon Falls and Lac La Croix-Loon Falls.

== See also ==
- List of rivers of Minnesota
