= Horse River =

Coordinates: 48.1107276°N 91.7073480°W

Location
- Country: United States

Physical characteristics
- Source
  - location: Minnesota

The Horse River is a river of Minnesota.

== See also ==
- List of rivers of Minnesota
