= Sturgeon River (Big Fork River tributary) =

Coordinates: 48°12′44″N 93°53′01″W

Location
- Country: United States

Physical characteristics
- Source
  - location: Minnesota

The Sturgeon River is a river of Minnesota, located in Koochiching County near Big Falls. It is a tributary of the Big Fork River.

Sturgeon River was named for its lake sturgeon.

== See also ==
- List of rivers of Minnesota
