= Sand River (Pike River tributary) =

- Mouth of Sand River

Location
- Country: United States
- State: Minnesota
- County: St. Louis

Physical characteristics
- Source
  - location: Biwabik, Minnesota
  - coordinates: 47.6260353°N 92.5854574°W
- Mouth
  - location: Britt, Minnesota
  - coordinates: 47°38′11″N 92°25′11″W

The Sand River is a river of Minnesota. It is a tributary of the Pike River.

== See also ==
- List of rivers of Minnesota
