= Little Willow River (Mississippi River tributary) =

Coordinates: 46.5644026°N 93.7533055°W

Location
- Country: United States

Physical characteristics
- Source
  - location: Minnesota

The Little Willow River is a 26.2-mile-long (42.2 km) tributary of the Mississippi River in northern Minnesota, United States. It rises in western Aitkin County at the outlet of Esquagamah Lake and flows generally south to its junction with the Mississippi River 3 miles (5 km) northwest of Aitkin.

== See also ==
- List of rivers of Minnesota
