= Black River (Rainy River tributary) =

Coordinates: 48.5157852°N 93.7951694°W

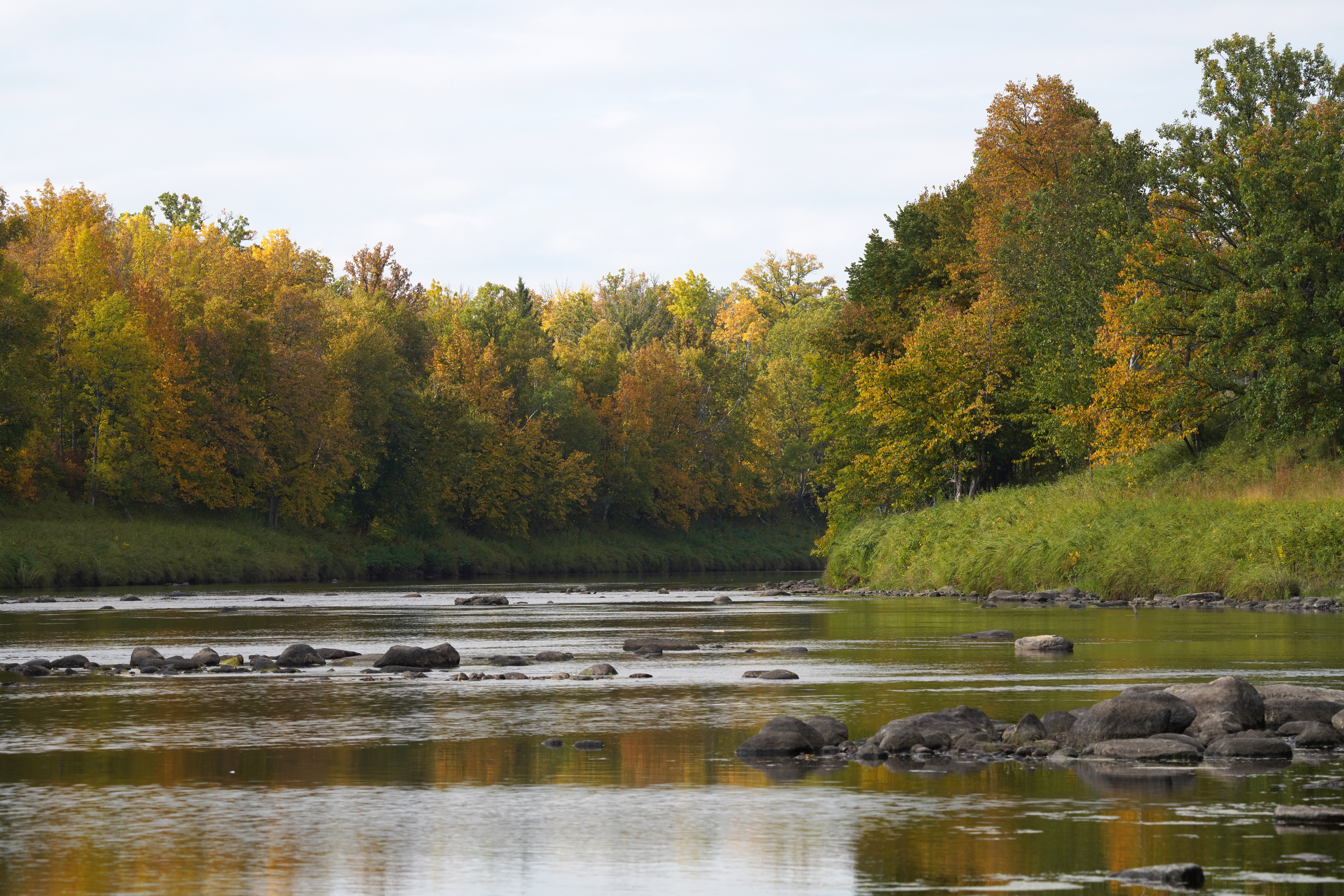

Location
- Country: United States

Physical characteristics
- Source
  - location: Minnesota

The Black River is a river of Minnesota. It is a tributary of the Rainy River.

Black River was so named on account of its water being discolored by peat.

== See also ==
- List of rivers of Minnesota
