= Lost River (Nett Lake) =

Coordinates: 48°9′8″N 92°57′42″W

Location
- Country: United States

Physical characteristics
- Source
  - location: Minnesota

The Lost River (Nett Lake) is a river of Minnesota.

== See also ==
- List of rivers of Minnesota
