= Sandy River (Red Lake) =

Coordinates: 47.88023°N 95.23778°W

Location
- Country: United States

Physical characteristics
- Source
  - location: Minnesota

The Sandy River is a 28.8-mile-long (46.3 km) tributary of Red Lake in northwestern Minnesota in the United States.

== See also ==
- List of rivers of Minnesota
