= Cat River (Minnesota) =

Coordinates: 46.6299602°N 94.8741839°W

Location
- Country: United States

Physical characteristics
- Source
  - location: Minnesota

The Cat River is a 16.3-mile-long (26.2 km) tributary of the Crow Wing River in the U.S. state of Minnesota. It is part of the Mississippi River drainage basin.

Cat River was named for the cougars which were once common in the area.

== See also ==
- List of rivers of Minnesota
