= Sawbill Creek =

Coordinates: 47°49′19″N 90°50′59″W

- Mouth of Sawbill Creek

Location
- Country: United States

Physical characteristics
- Source
  - location: Minnesota

The Sawbill Creek is a 4.7-mile-long (7.6 km) stream in northeastern Minnesota, the United States. It rises at the outlet of Sawbill Lake and is a tributary of the Temperance River.

== See also ==
- List of rivers of Minnesota
