= Stump River =

- Mouth of the

Location
- Country: United States
- State: Minnesota
- County: Cook County

Physical characteristics
- Source
  - coordinates: 48.0418312°N 90.1017573°W
- Mouth
  - coordinates: 48°01′29″N 89°58′57″W

The Stump River is a 14.2-mile-long (22.9 km) tributary of the Pigeon River in Minnesota, United States. It flows through the Boundary Waters Canoe Area Wilderness of Superior National Forest.

== See also ==
- List of rivers of Minnesota
