= Shannon River (Minnesota) =

Location
- Country: United States

Physical characteristics
- Source
  - location: Hibbing, Minnesota
  - coordinates: 47°28′43″N 92°57′11″W
- Mouth
  - coordinates: 47°39′13″N 92°56′18″W

The Shannon River is a river in St. Louis County, Minnesota.

== See also ==
- List of rivers of Minnesota
