= Ann River =

Coordinates: 45.8310711°N 93.3338373°W

Location
- Country: United States

Physical characteristics
- Source
  - location: Minnesota

The Ann River is a 14.4-mile-long (23.2 km) tributary of the Snake River of Minnesota, United States. It begins at the outlet of Ann Lake and flows generally southeast, reaching the Snake River south of Mora.

Ann River was named for an Ojibwe Indian woman who lived in the area.

== See also ==
- List of rivers of Minnesota
