= Steamboat River (Cass County, Minnesota) =

Stream in Cass County, Minnesota, U.S.

Coordinates: 47°13′23″N 94°36′23″W

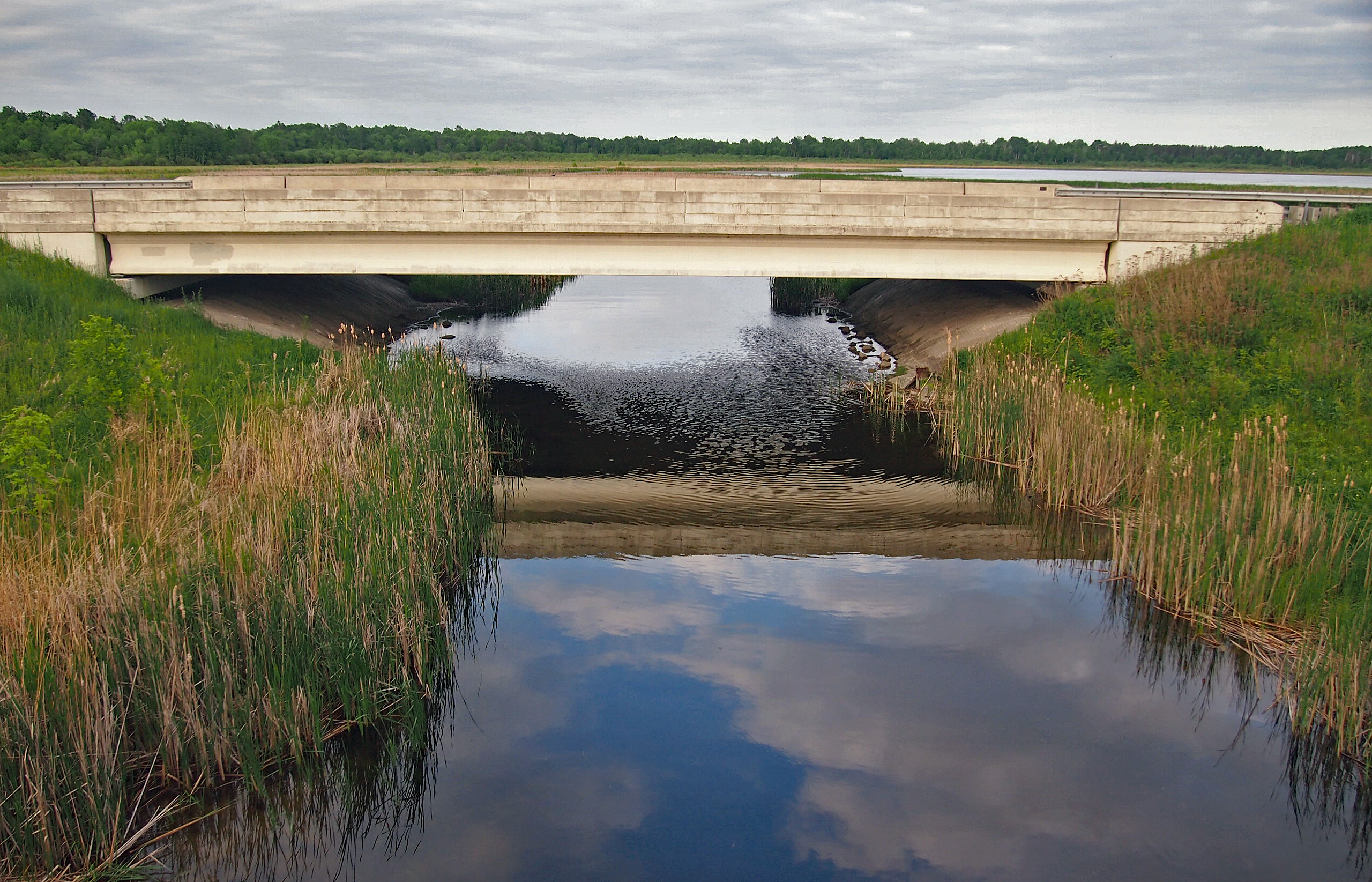
The Steamboat River passing under Minnesota State Highway 371

The Steamboat River is a stream in Cass County, Minnesota, in the United States. The Steamboat River was so named from the fact steamboats navigated this stream.
