= Langley River =

Coordinates: 47.3179791°N 91.7507278°W

- Mouth of the Langley River

Location
- Country: United States

Physical characteristics
- Source
  - location: Minnesota

The Langley River is an 11.9-mile-long (19.2 km) tributary of the Cloquet River of Minnesota, United States, north of Two Harbors.

== See also ==
- List of rivers of Minnesota
