= Birch River (Minnesota) =

Coordinates: 47.7382492°N 91.9437676°W

Location
- Country: United States

Physical characteristics
- Source
  - location: Minnesota

The Birch River (Minnesota) is a river of Minnesota.

== See also ==
- List of rivers of Minnesota
