= Turtle River (Mississippi River tributary) =

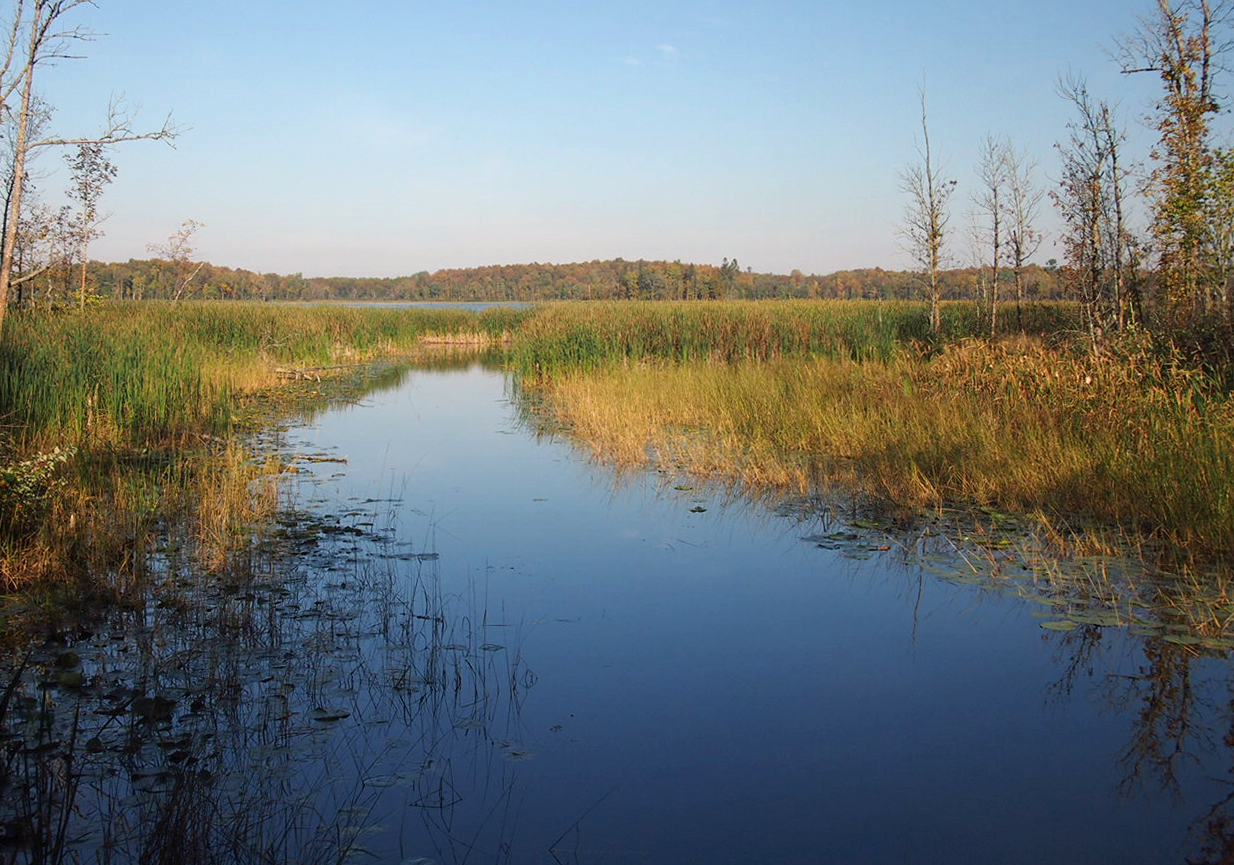
- The Turtle River flowing out of Three Island Lake

- Mouth of the Turtle River

Location
- Country: United States
- State: Minnesota
- County: Beltami County

Physical characteristics
- Source
  - location: Puposky Lake
  - coordinates: 47.6382874°N 94.9594423°W
- Mouth
  - location: Cass Lake
  - coordinates: 47°29′46″N 94°32′08″W
- Length: 49 mi-long (79 km)

The Turtle River is a river of Minnesota. It is a tributary of the Mississippi River and was formally thought to be the headwaters of the Mississippi River. It is 49 miles (79 km) long and located in Beltrami County.

== See also ==
- List of rivers of Minnesota
- List of longest streams of Minnesota
