= Net River (Minnesota) =

Coordinates: 46°30′42″N 92°20′49″W

Location
- Country: United States

Physical characteristics
- Source
  - location: Minnesota

The Net River is a 24.5-mile-long (39.4 km) tributary of the South Fork Nemadji River in Pine and Carlton counties, Minnesota, United States. Via the Nemadji River, it flows to Lake Superior at Superior, Wisconsin.

"Net River" is probably an English translation of the Ojibwe-language name.

== See also ==
- List of rivers of Minnesota
