= East Swan River =

- Mouth of the East Swan River

Location
- Country: United States
- State: Minnesota
- County: St. Louis County

Physical characteristics
- Source
  - coordinates: 47.3507668°N 92.834356°W
- Mouth
  - coordinates: 47.2079925°N 92.7979713°W
- Length: 24.2-mile-long (38.9 km)

Basin features
- River system: Saint Louis River

The East Swan River is a 24.2-mile-long (38.9 km) tributary of the Saint Louis River in St. Louis County, Minnesota, Minnesota, United States. As of 2021, there is an angling easement on the river, however trout fishing is considered marginal. Some efforts have been made in stocking the river with brown trout, however those efforts have been met with limited success.

== See also ==
- List of rivers of Minnesota
