= Nina Moose River =

Coordinates: 48°12′23″N 92°04′30″W

Location
- Country: United States

Physical characteristics
- Source
  - location: Minnesota

The Nina Moose River is a river of the U.S. state of Minnesota.

== See also ==
- List of rivers of Minnesota
