= Tamarac River (Red Lake) =

Coordinates: 48.17496°N 94.51523°W

Location
- Country: United States

Physical characteristics
- Source
  - location: Minnesota

The Tamarac River is a 21.3-mile-long (34.3 km) tributary of Red Lake in northern Minnesota in the United States.

== See also ==
- List of rivers of Minnesota
