= Lost River (Clearwater River tributary) =

Coordinates: 47.84496°N 96.08893°W

Location
- Country: United States

Physical characteristics
- Source
  - location: Minnesota

The Lost River is a 76.2-mile-long (122.6 km) tributary of the Clearwater River of northwestern Minnesota in the United States. Via the Clearwater River, the Red Lake River, the Red River of the North, Lake Winnipeg, and the Nelson River, it is part of the watershed of Hudson Bay.

Lost River was named from the fact it once passed under a bog until the bogs were drained.

== See also ==
- List of rivers of Minnesota
