= Blackduck River =

Coordinates: 47.8894017°N 94.7705361°W

- Native name: Gaa-gaagishibizibiing (Ojibwe)

Location
- Country: United States

Physical characteristics
- Source
  - location: Minnesota

The Blackduck River is a 33.2-mile-long (53.4 km) tributary of Red Lake in northwestern Minnesota in the United States.

== See also ==
- List of rivers of Minnesota
