= Stony River (Minnesota) =

Coordinates: 47°28′14″N 91°33′40″W

Location
- Country: United States

Physical characteristics
- Source
  - location: Minnesota

The Stony River (Minnesota) is a river of Minnesota. It flows into the Rainy River.

== See also ==
- List of rivers of Minnesota
