= List of longest streams of Minnesota =

Longest streams of Minnesota
- (Note: In North America, the term watershed is commonly used to mean a drainage basin, though in other English-speaking countries, it is used only in its original sense, that of a drainage divide.)

Out of the 6,564 streams that flow through the U.S. State of Minnesota, there are 114 streams that are at least 30 miles long. The second longest river in the United States, the Mississippi River, originates in Minnesota before flowing south to the Gulf of Mexico. The longest river entirely within the state of Minnesota is the Minnesota River. Other rivers over 200 miles long include the Red River of the North, Des Moines River, Cedar River, Wapsipinicon River, Little Sioux River, and Roseau River.

Sections of several of the longest rivers define sections of the Minnesota border. The Red River of the North forms the border with North Dakota to the west. The Bois de Sioux River forms the border with South Dakota to the west. The Mississippi River, St. Croix River, and the St. Louis River form the border with Wisconsin to the east. The Rainy River and Pigeon River form the border with Ontario, Canada to the north.

Minnesota contains three major drainage basins with waters from Minnesota rivers flowing south, north, or east. These major drainage basins meet in a triple divide point called the Hill of Three Waters, just north of Hibbing, Minnesota.

- The Mississippi River drains south to the Gulf of Mexico. In Minnesota, this basin is traditionally subdivided into the following major sub-basins:
  - Headwaters of the Mississippi River (above St. Paul)
  - Minnesota River drainage basin (17,000 sq mi (44,000 km^{2}))
  - St. Croix River drainage basin (7,700 sq mi (20,000 km^{2}))
  - Lower portion of the Upper Mississippi River (Below St. Paul). Some of these rivers discharge into the Mississippi within the borders of Minnesota, and some farther south, including the Des Moines River, the Cedar / Iowa River, and others
  - Tributaries of the Missouri River also have drainage basins in far southwest Minnesota
- Water flows to the north in the Hudson Bay/Arctic drainage basin (3,861,400 sq mi (10,001,000 km^{2})), which includes the Red River of the North drainage basin (111,004 sq mi (287,500 km^{2})) and Lake of the Woods drainage basin (13,805 sq mi (35,750 km^{2}))—of which 7,285 sq mi (18,870 km^{2}) is in Minnesota.
- The Great Lakes Basin to the east includes the Lake Superior drainage basin in Minnesota and Wisconsin (49,300 sq mi (128,000 km^{2})). Minnesota water flows eastward through the Great Lakes to the Atlantic Ocean.

== Table of longest streams ==
A sortable table below lists the 114 streams flowing in Minnesota that have a total length greater than or equal to 30 miles. The stream's tributary and watershed are given. The source or mouth of some streams is in other U.S. states or Canadian provinces. Other than border rivers, the only rivers that originate in other states are the Little Minnesota River (South Dakota), St. Croix River (Wisconsin), and Upper Tamarack River (Wisconsin). The 21 streams that are not entirely within the state are indicated by a † after the order number. The coordinates and location county of the mouth and source of the stream are indicated, as well as the United States Geological Survey (USGS) Geographic Names Information System ID and other references and notes. (Note: The state is given for non-Minnesota counties) Lengths and elevations are derived from the National Elevation Dataset or reference to it in the USGS GNIS Database. A link to an Open Street Map template is listed at the top of this article that will generate a map showing the source and mouth coordinates of all of these streams. For consistency and accuracy, the sources for this information are primarily data from the USGS GeoNames and National Elevation database, supplemented by other sources.

Streams with length of 30 miles or longer that flow in Minnesota
Rank	Stream name	Tributary of	Length		Drainage basin	Mouth elevation		Mouth Location	Mouth coordinates	Source location	Source coordinates	GNIS ID, References, Notes
Rank	Stream name	Tributary of	mi	km	Drainage basin	ft	m	Mouth Location	Mouth coordinates	Source location	Source coordinates	GNIS ID, References, Notes
112†	Pigeon River	Lake Superior	31.2	50.2	Lake Superior	602	183	Cook County/Ontario, Pigeon Point	47°59′57″N 89°34′10″W	Cook County/Ontario, South Fowl Lake	48°02′23″N 89°59′47″W	657824
93	Brule River	Lake Superior	40	65	Lake Superior	602	183	Cook County, Marr Island	47°49′00″N 90°03′00″W	Cook County, Hungry Jack Lake	48°00′25″N 90°28′20″W	655530 (Note: Portions of the Brule (31.5 mi), Cloquet (29.9), Little Cannon (12.5 mi), Little Isabella (33.17), Nemadji (13.44 mi), Temperance (24.56 mi), and Vermillion (22.8) rivers, are Minnesota DNR designated trout streams.) (Note: Length is an average of the 2013 lengths)
97	Temperance River	Lake Superior	39	63	Lake Superior	602	183	Cook County, Tofte	47°33′12″N 90°52′25″W	Cook County, Brule Lake	47°55′42″N 90°46′54″W	658627 (Note: The USGS National dataset lists the elevation of the Temperance River as 597 ft (182 m))
10†	St. Louis River	Lake Superior	192	309	Lake Superior	602	183	St. Louis County, West Duluth	46°45′N 92°06′W	St. Louis County, Douglas County, Wisconsin (Note: The St. Louis River forms the border between St. Louis County, Minnesota and Douglas County, Wisconsin before it discharges into Lake Superior.)	47°30′04″N 91°49′51″W	662334 (Note: The USGS National dataset lists the elevation of the St. Louis River as 597 ft (182 m))
37	Cloquet River	St. Louis River	104	167	Lake Superior	1,201	366	St. Louis County	46°51′41″N 92°34′13″W	Lake County, Cloquet Lake	47°25′53″N 91°29′12″W	661012
109	Little Isabella River	Isabella River	33	53	Hudson Bay	1,503	458	Lake County	47°48′15″N 91°27′17″W	Lake County	47°36′28″N 91°20′11″W	657071
60	Whiteface River	St. Louis River	64	104	Lake Superior	1,250	381	St. Louis County, McCarty River	46°58′45″N 92°48′41″W	St. Louis County, Whiteface Reservoir	47°16′53″N 92°11′16″W	662794
88	West Swan River	East Swan River	42	68	Lake Superior	1,260	384	St. Louis County, Little Swan	47°15′04″N 92°49′06″W	St. Louis County, Keewatin	47°24′49″N 93°00′28″W	662774
74	Embarrass River	St. Louis River	51	81	Lake Superior	1,329	405	St. Louis County, Gilbert	47°41′46″N 91°59′50″W	St. Louis County, Babbitt	47°23′32″N 92°24′52″W	661216
101	Partridge River	St. Louis River	37	60	Lake Superior	1,394	425	St. Louis County, Turpela Lake	47°29′36″N 92°13′44″W	St. Louis County, Babbitt	47°38′16″N 91°59′09″W	662142
56†	Nemadji River	Lake Superior	71	114	Lake Superior	602	183	Douglas County, Wisconsin, Superior	46°24′03″N 92°30′29″W	Pine County, Minnesota, Nickerson	46°42′12″N 92°01′39″W	1570172 (Note: 32.8 miles of the Nemadji River flows through Minnesota.) (Note: The USGS National dataset lists the elevation Nemadji River as 597 ft (182 m))
1†	Mississippi River	Gulf of Mexico	2,320	3,734	Mississippi River	0	0	Louisiana, Pilottown, Plaquemines Parish	29°09′04″N 89°15′12″W	Clearwater County, Itasca State Park (Note: The Mississippi River at its source has an elevation of 1,475 ft (450 m))	47°14′23″N 95°12′27″W	1629903 (Note: The Mississippi River flows for 680 mi (1,090 km) within Minnesota.)
4	Minnesota River	Mississippi River	370	595	Mississippi River (Upper)	696	212	Ramsey County, St. Paul	44°53′49″N 93°08′57″W	Big Stone County, Ortonville (Note: The elevation of the Minnesota River is 964 ft (294 m) at its source)	45°18′10″N 96°27′07″W	659759
13†	St. Croix River	Mississippi River	169	272	Mississippi River (Upper)	686	209	Dakota County, Hastings	44°44′45″N 92°48′10″W	Douglas County, Wisconsin, Upper St. Croix Lake	46°23′19″N 91°45′34″W	662324 (Note: 129.2 miles of the St. Croix River flow either on the Minnesota border or within Minnesota.)
2†	Red River of the North	Lake Winnipeg	550	885	Hudson Bay	715	218	Lake Winnipeg, Manitoba	50°24′01″N 96°48′00″W	Confluence of Bois de Sioux and Ottertail Rivers, Breckenridge (Note: The source elevation of the Red River of the North is 948 ft (289 m))	46°15′52″N 96°35′55″W	1035890 (Note: According to the Minnesota Department of Natural Resources, 394 mi (634 km) of the Red River of the North are in the United States. This amounts to about 72 percent of the main-stem length.)
7†	Little Sioux River	Missouri River	258	415	Mississippi River (Lower)	1,010	308	Harrison County, Iowa	41°48′11″N 96°03′58″W	Jackson County	43°39′52″N 95°18′53″W	657126
65†	Ocheyedan River	Little Sioux River	58	93	Mississippi River (Lower)	1,306	398	Spencer, Clay County, Iowa	43°08′10″N 95°09′11″W	Ocheda Lake, Nobles County	43°32′49″N 95°38′17″W	459796
22†	Rock River	Big Sioux River	144	232	Mississippi River (Lower)	1,168	356	Sioux County, Iowa	43°04′58″N 96°27′16″W	Pipestone County	44°08′13″N 96°07′23″W	460744 (Note: The Rock River flows for 88.9 mi (143.1 km) within Minnesota.)
71†	Split Rock Creek	Big Sioux River	55	89	Mississippi River (Lower)	1,280	390	Minnehaha County, South Dakota	43°32′59″N 96°35′51″W	Rock County	43°59′27″N 96°18′22″W	652403
72	Pipestone Creek	Split Rock Creek	53	86	Mississippi River (Lower)	1,506	459	Rock County	43°48′14″N 96°26′28″W	Pipestone County	44°01′52″N 96°17′25″W	649528
90	Flandreau Creek	Big Sioux River	41	66	Mississippi River (Lower)	1,529	466	Moody County, South Dakota	44°03′30″N 96°33′16″W	Lincoln County	44°13′53″N 96°17′06″W	643728
3†	Des Moines River	Mississippi River	525	845	Mississippi River (Lower)	597	182	Clark County, Missouri / Lee County, Iowa, near Keokuk, Iowa	40°22′52″N 91°25′21″W	Lyon County	44°05′02″N 95°41′17″W	465582 (Note: The Des Moines River flows for 68 mi (109 km) within Minnesota.)
61†	Jack Creek	Des Moines River	64	103	Mississippi River (Lower)	1,401	427	Jackson County	43°46′02″N 95°17′09″W	Nobles County	43°47′40″N 95°49′54″W	645551
5†	Cedar River	Iowa River	338	544	Mississippi River (Lower)	594	181	Louisa County, Iowa	41°16′59″N 91°20′49″W	Dodge County	43°50′05″N 92°48′28″W	465058 (Note: The Cedar River flows for a little over 25 mi (40 km) within Minnesota.)
31†	Shell Rock River	Cedar River	113	182	Mississippi River (Lower)	869	265	Black Hawk County, Iowa	42°38′03″N 92°30′05″W	Albert Lea Lake,Freeborn County	43°36′42″N 93°17′37″W	461563
48†	Little Cedar River	Cedar River	82	133	Mississippi River (Lower)	945	288	Chickasaw County, Iowa	42°57′02″N 92°31′39″W	Mower County, Brownsdale	43°39′16″N 92°45′22″W	458453
17†	Upper Iowa River	Mississippi River	156	251	Mississippi River (Lower)	620	189	Allamakee County, Iowa	43°27′58″N 91°14′02″W	Mower County	43°37′16″N 92°37′23″W	462496 (Note: The Upper Iowa River flows for 50.4 mi (81.1 km) in Minnesota.)
6†	Wapsipinicon River	Mississippi River	300	482	Mississippi River (Lower)	574	175	Scott County, Iowa	41°43′47″N 90°19′11″W	Mower County (Note: Wapsipinicon River has a source elevation of 1,348 ft (411 m))	43°32′55″N 92°38′40″W	462671
51	Root River	Mississippi River	80	129	Mississippi River (Lower)	630	192	Houston County	43°45′43″N 91°15′06″W	Fillmore County, Chatfield	43°48′24″N 92°10′14″W	650249
59	Zumbro River	Mississippi River	65	104	Mississippi River (Lower)	666	203	Wabasha County	44°17′30″N 91°55′41″W	Olmsted County	44°09′10″N 92°28′02″W	654509
33	Cannon River	Mississippi River	112	180	Mississippi River (Lower)	666	203	Goodhue County	44°35′09″N 92°33′25″W	Le Sueur County	44°21′31″N 93°26′51″W	640874
114	Little Cannon River	Cannon River	31	49	Mississippi River (Lower)	781	238	Goodhue County	44°30′44″N 92°54′20″W	Rice County	44°19′04″N 93°04′43″W	646775
69	Straight River	Cannon River	56	89	Mississippi River (Lower)	961	293	Rice County	44°18′36″N 93°16′13″W	Freeborn County	44°30′44″N 92°54′20″W	652708
64	Vermillion River	Mississippi River	60	96	Mississippi River (Lower)	676	206	Goodhue County	44°30′44″N 92°54′20″W	Scott County	44°37′14″N 92°40′01″W	653634
95	Vermilion River	Rainy River	40	64	Hudson Bay	1,112	339	St. Louis County	48°16′33″N 92°30′23″W	St. Louis County	47°57′40″N 92°28′33″W	662718
98	Sunrise River	St. Croix River	39	63	St. Croix River	768	234	Chisago County	45°34′00″N 92°51′46″W	Washington County	45°17′24″N 92°58′28″W	652846
38	Snake River	St. Croix River	104	167	St. Croix River	797	243	Pine County	45°49′27″N 92°45′53″W	Aitkin County	46°17′17″N 93°06′43″W	658321
96	Groundhouse River	Snake River	40	64	St. Croix River	948	289	Kanabec County	45°48′39″N 93°15′44″W	Mille Lacs County	45°58′31″N 93°34′03″W	644496
46	Kettle River	St. Croix River	84	135	St. Croix River	810	247	Pine County	45°51′28″N 92°44′11″W	Carlton County	46°41′14″N 92°47′17″W	646128
111	Willow River	Kettle River	31	51	St. Croix River	1,020	311	Pine County	46°19′11″N 92°50′48″W	Pine County	46°21′54″N 92°28′26″W	654205
105	Moose Horn River	Kettle River	36	59	St. Croix River	1,020	311	Carlton County	46°21′54″N 92°28′26″W	Carlton County	46°40′15″N 92°36′26″W	648090
87	Sand Creek	St. Croix River	43	70	St. Croix River	853	260	Pine County	45°56′03″N 92°38′25″W	Pine County	46°16′34″N 92°31′56″W	651137
99	Lower Tamarack River	St. Croix River	39	63	St. Croix River	876	267	Pine County	46°01′39″N 92°25′10″W	Pine County	46°18′56″N 92°25′44″W	647267
113	Upper Tamarack River	St. Croix River	31	50	St. Croix River	886	270	Pine County	46°04′13″N 92°19′09″W	Douglas County, Wisconsin	46°20′00″N 92°05′11″W	1815030
104	Sand Creek	Minnesota River	37	59	Minnesota River	696	212	Scott County	44°44′53″N 93°36′50″W	Le Sueur County	44°28′44″N 93°33′26″W	651135
57	High Island Creek	Minnesota River	69	112	Minnesota River	722	220	Sibley County	44°35′08″N 93°54′05″W	Renville County	44°38′58″N 94°42′12″W	644939
35	Blue Earth River	Minnesota River	108	174	Minnesota River	751	229	Blue Earth County	44°09′51″N 94°02′13″W	Faribault County	43°34′20″N 94°06′11″W	640285
34	Le Sueur River	Blue Earth River	111	178	Minnesota River	764	233	Blue Earth County	44°07′36″N 94°02′52″W	Freeborn County	43°46′03″N 93°28′13″W	646550
50	Maple River	Le Sueur River	80	129	Minnesota River	814	248	Blue Earth County	44°05′14″N 94°00′55″W	Freeborn County	43°47′05″N 93°38′28″W	647499
53	Cobb River	Le Sueur River	79	126	Minnesota River	810	247	Blue Earth County	44°04′39″N 94°00′03″W	Freeborn County	43°45′16″N 93°34′48″W	641371
102	Little Cobb River	Cobb River	37	60	Minnesota River	974	297	Blue Earth County	43°59′31″N 93°55′16″W	Waseca County	43°52′47″N 93°39′29″W	646783
30	Watonwan River	Blue Earth River	113	182	Minnesota River	869	265	Blue Earth County	44°04′13″N 94°07′35″W	Cottonwood County	44°01′30″N 95°13′12″W	653842
100	Perch Creek	Watonwan River	37	60	Minnesota River	938	286	Blue Earth County	44°00′07″N 94°16′54″W	Martin County	43°48′16″N 94°28′23″W	649278
43	Elm Creek	Blue Earth River	90	144	Minnesota River	1,014	309	Faribault County	43°45′17″N 94°11′48″W	Jackson County	43°47′05″N 95°02′34″W	643295
47	Little Cottonwood River	Minnesota River	83	133	Minnesota River	778	237	Blue Earth County	44°15′05″N 94°19′47″W	Cottonwood County	44°02′28″N 95°11′35″W	646788
19	Cottonwood River	Minnesota River	152	245	Minnesota River	694	212	Brown County	44°17′05″N 94°24′55″W	Lyon County	44°12′06″N 95°56′06″W	641538
73	Sleepy Eye Creek	Cottonwood River	52	83	Minnesota River	961	293	Brown County	44°15′12″N 94°46′22″W	Redwood County	44°24′12″N 95°31′08″W	652151
107	Plum Creek	Cottonwood River	35	57	Minnesota River	1,076	328	Redwood County	44°16′52″N 95°22′44″W	Murray County	44°10′33″N 95°36′08″W	649592
25	Redwood River	Minnesota River	127	205	Minnesota River	830	253	Redwood County	44°34′16″N 95°05′18″W	Pipestone	44°10′03″N 96°10′18″W	658010
62	Hawk Creek	Minnesota River	62	100	Minnesota River	869	265	Renville County	44°44′10″N 95°25′21″W	Kandiyohi County	45°07′28″N 95°04′30″W	644736
36	Yellow Medicine River	Minnesota River	107	173	Minnesota River	666	203	Yellow Medicine County	44°44′21″N 95°25′43″W	Lincoln County	44°24′41″N 96°21′05″W	654416
108	Spring Creek	Yellow Medicine River	33	54	Minnesota River	1,030	314	Yellow Medicine County	44°42′38″N 95°40′23″W	Yellow Medicine County	44°47′25″N 96°08′07″W	652432
18	Chippewa River	Minnesota River	153	246	Minnesota River	919	280	Chippewa County	44°56′05″N 95°44′00″W	Douglas County	45°59′17″N 95°38′44″W	641167
79	Shakopee Creek	Chipppewa River	49	78	Minnesota River	919	280	Swift County	45°12′17″N 95°39′49″W	Kandiyohi County	45°18′13″N 95°02′50″W	651899
91	Little Chippewa River	Chippewa River	41	66	Minnesota River	1,106	337	Pope County	45°35′33″N 95°41′00″W	Pope County	45°43′48″N 95°30′59″W	641167
28	Lac qui Parle River	Minnesota River	118	190	Minnesota River	935	285	Lac qui Parle County	45°35′33″N 95°41′00″W	Lincoln County	44°30′17″N 96°26′06″W	646304
26	Pomme de Terre River	Minnesota River	125	200	Minnesota River	942	287	Swift County	45°10′33″N 96°05′13″W	Otter Tail County	46°11′55″N 95°51′20″W	649622
55†	Little Minnesota River	Minnesota River	71	115	Minnesota River	968	295	Big Stone County	45°33′14″N 96°47′43″W	Roberts County, South Dakota	45°50′09″N 97°21′21″W	646859
20	Rum River	Mississippi River	151	243	Mississippi River (Upper)	827	252	Anoka County	45°11′23″N 93°23′26″W	Mille Lacs County	46°07′47″N 93°46′52″W	650382
16	North Fork Crow River	Crow River	158	253	Mississippi River (Upper)	906	276	Wright County	45°04′53″N 93°45′45″W	Pope County	45°36′07″N 95°10′16″W	648637
83	Middle Fork Crow River	Crow River	45	73	Mississippi River (Upper)	1,099	335	Meeker County	45°15′09″N 94°36′08″W	Stearns County	45°26′05″N 94°59′11″W	647809
29	South Fork Crow River	Crow River	116	187	Mississippi River (Upper)	614	187	Wright County	45°04′53″N 93°45′45″W	Kandiyohi County	45°03′26″N 94°55′18″W	663175
44	Buffalo Creek	South Fork Crow River	84	136	Mississippi River (Upper)	948	289	Carver County	44°51′16″N 93°59′52″W	Kandiyohi County	44°55′07″N 94°59′25″W	663168
45	Elk River	Mississippi River	84	135	Mississippi River (Upper)	850	259	Sherburne County	45°17′53″N 93°34′21″W	Benton County	45°49′09″N 93°55′40″W	643267
52	St. Francis River	Elk River	79	127	Mississippi River (Upper)	915	279	Sherburne County	45°21′33″N 93°44′14″W	Benton County	45°48′29″N 93°53′31″W	650587
86	Clearwater River	Mississippi River	43	70	Mississippi River	938	286	Stearns County	45°25′22″N 94°02′57″W	Meeker County	45°21′22″N 94°25′43″W	641322 (Note: The Clearwater River is a MN DNR designated trout stream.)
27	Sauk River	Mississippi River	122	196	Mississippi River (Upper)	991	302	Stearns County	45°35′30″N 94°10′35″W	Todd County	45°53′45″N 95°05′45″W	651237
70	Platte River	Mississippi River	55	89	Mississippi River (Upper)	1,020	311	Benton County	45°46′45″N 94°16′45″W	Crow Wing County	46°12′02″N 93°54′13″W	649544
106	Skunk River	Patte River	36	58	Mississippi River (Upper)	1,099	335	Morrison County	45°56′09″N 94°13′24″W	Morrison County	46°07′35″N 93°51′42″W	652139
103	Swan River	Mississippi River	37	60	Mississippi River (Upper)	1,083	330	Morrison County	45°55′10″N 94°23′08″W	Todd County	45°54′27″N 94°44′46″W	652909
82	Nokasippi River	Mississippi River	47	75	Mississippi River (Upper)	1,142	348	Crow Wing County, Clear Water Lake	46°10′39″N 94°21′53″W	Crow Wing County, Fort Ripley	46°24′47″N 93°54′41″W	648568
32	Crow Wing River	Mississippi River	113	182	Mississippi River (Upper)	1,148	350	Cass County	46°16′16″N 94°20′23″W	Hubbard County	47°00′07″N 94°44′29″W	655896
40	Long Prairie River	Crow Wing River	96	154	Mississippi River (Upper)	1,204	367	Morrison County	46°19′27″N 94°36′46″W	Douglas County	45°58′58″N 95°19′59″W	647141
110	Partridge River	Crow Wing River	33	52	Mississippi River (Upper)	1,240	378	Wadena County	46°25′11″N 94°49′36″W	Todd County	46°12′22″N 95°02′49″W	649176
85	Leaf River	Crow Wing River	44	70	Mississippi River (Upper)	1,240	378	Wadena County	46°25′47″N 94°48′51″W	Otter Tail County	46°24′08″N 95°25′36″W	646564
54	Redeye River	Leaf River	73	117	Mississippi River (Upper)	1,260	384	Wadena County	46°29′10″N 94°53′06″W	Becker County	46°49′17″N 95°25′06″W	649894
80	Wing River	Leaf River	48	78	Mississippi River (Upper)	1,280	390	Wadena County	46°28′48″N 94°58′49″W	Otter Tail County	46°14′33″N 95°17′31″W	654255
81	Shell River	Crow Wing River	48	77	Mississippi River (Upper)	1,362	415	Wadena County	46°48′26″N 94°53′16″W	Becker County	46°56′50″N 95°24′39″W	651945
67	Pine River	Mississippi River	57	92	Mississippi River (Upper)	1,175	358	Crow Wing County	46°33′50″N 94°02′12″W	Cass County	46°48′17″N 94°31′26″W	659997 (Note: The Pine River (Mississippi River tributary) should not be confused with the Pine River (Minnesota–Ontario) or Pine River (Saint Louis River tributary), both of which are less than 30 miles long.)
66	Rice River	Mississippi River	57	92	Mississippi River (Upper)	1,194	364	Aitkin County	46°35′23″N 93°38′04″W	Aitkin County	46°22′58″N 93°19′03″W	650053
84	Willow River	Mississippi River	45	72	Mississippi River (Upper)	1,201	366	Aitkin County	46°40′22″N 93°35′33″W	Cass County	47°05′27″N 93°50′44″W	659024
63	Swan River	Mississippi River	60	97	Mississippi River (Upper)	1,227	374	Aitkin County	47°00′33″N 93°15′50″W	Itasca County	47°17′21″N 93°11′54″W	658570
8†	Roseau River	Red River of the North	214	344	Red River of the North	758	231	Kittson County	49°09′00″N 97°14′59″W	Lake of the Woods County	48°31′44″N 95°12′17″W	659936 (Note: The Roseau River flows for 116.6 mi (187.6 km) in Minnesota)
49	Tamarac River	Red River of the North	82	132	Red River of the North	771	235	Marshall County	48°29′23″N 97°07′50″W	Marshall County	48°30′10″N 96°27′23″W	652994
42	Snake River	Red River of the North	91	146	Red River of the North	771	235	Marshall County	48°25′59″N 97°07′26″W	Polk County	48°21′21″N 96°27′40″W	652198
89	Grand Marais Creek	Red River of the North	41	66	Red River of the North	794	242	Polk County	48°04′12″N 97°05′49″W	Polk County	47°49′09″N 96°48′20″W	644325
9	Red Lake River	Red River of the North	193	311	Red River of the North	797	243	Polk County	47°55′21″N 97°01′17″W	Beltrami County	47°57′35″N 95°16′28″W	649867
21	Clearwater River	Red Lake River	147	237	Red River of the North	948	289	Red Lake County	47°53′38″N 96°16′58″W	Mahnomen County	47°28′50″N 95°34′08″W	641321
39	Sand Hill River	Red River of the North	101	163	Red River of the North	840	256	Polk County	47°35′55″N 96°51′21″W	Mahnomen County	47°30′55″N 95°44′52″W	655066
77	Marsh River	Red River of the North	50	80	Red River of the North	827	252	Norman County	47°28′12″N 96°51′37″W	Norman County	47°17′23″N 96°28′18″W	647559
12	Wild Rice River	Red River of the North	183	295	Red River of the North	850	259	Norman County	47°19′05″N 96°50′14″W	Clearwater County	47°23′03″N 95°18′30″W	654136
23	Buffalo River	Red River of the North	139	224	Red River of the North	853	260	Clay County	47°05′17″N 96°48′58″W	Becker County	46°55′11″N 95°41′06″W	660006
11	Otter Tail River	Red River of the North	192	309	Red River of the North	951	290	Wilkin County	46°15′52″N 96°35′55″W	Becker County	47°01′39″N 95°32′40″W	657701
92†	Bois de Sioux River	Red River of the North	41	66	Red River of the North	951	290	Wilkin County	46°15′52″N 96°35′55″W	Roberts County, South Dakota	45°51′42″N 96°34′23″W	640348
24†	Rainy River	Lake of the Woods	137	220	Lake of the Woods	1,060	323	Lake of the Woods County	48°50′55″N 94°41′30″W	Koochiching County	48°36′54″N 93°21′12″W	657974
14	Big Fork River	Rainy River	168	270	Lake of the Woods	1,079	329	Koochiching County	48°31′00″N 93°43′01″W	Itasca County	47°45′23″N 94°02′32″W	655362
15	Little Fork River	Rainy River	160	257	Lake of the Woods	1,083	330	Koochiching County	48°31′39″N 93°35′17″W	Saint Louis County	47°49′13″N 92°27′59″W	661740
41	Middle River	Snake River	96	154	Red River of the North	794	242	Marshall County	48°22′17″N 97°04′47″W	Marshall County	48°24′44″N 96°00′54″W	647817
75	Prairie River	Mississippi River	50	80	Mississippi River	1,243	379	Itasca County	47°12′54″N 93°28′57″W	Itasca County	47°35′39″N 93°10′52″W	657937
68	Rapid River	Rainy River	56	90	Rainy River	1,063	324	Lake of the Woods County	48°41′41″N 94°26′10″W	Koochiching County	48°22′12″N 95°08′42″W	659998
78	Turtle River	Mississippi River	49	79	Mississippi River	1,302	397	Beltrami County	47°29′46″N 94°32′08″W	Beltrami County	47°38′18″N 94°57′34″W	658778
76	Caldwell Brook	Mississippi River	50	80	Mississippi River	1,214	370	Koochiching County	47°58′50″N 93°49′06″W	Itasca County	47°52′36″N 94°13′23″W	655592
58	Mustinka River	Lake Traverse	68	109	Hudson Bay	978	298	Traverse County	45.7650°N 96.6176°W	Otter Tail County	46.2124597°N 96.1045034°W	648407
94	Thief River	Red Lake River	40	65	Hudson bay	115	35	Marshall County	48°07′27″N 96°10′10″W	Pennington County	48°29′18″N 95°57′00″W	653128

== Map of Minnesota streams and lakes ==
The map below shows the major streams and lakes in Minnesota.

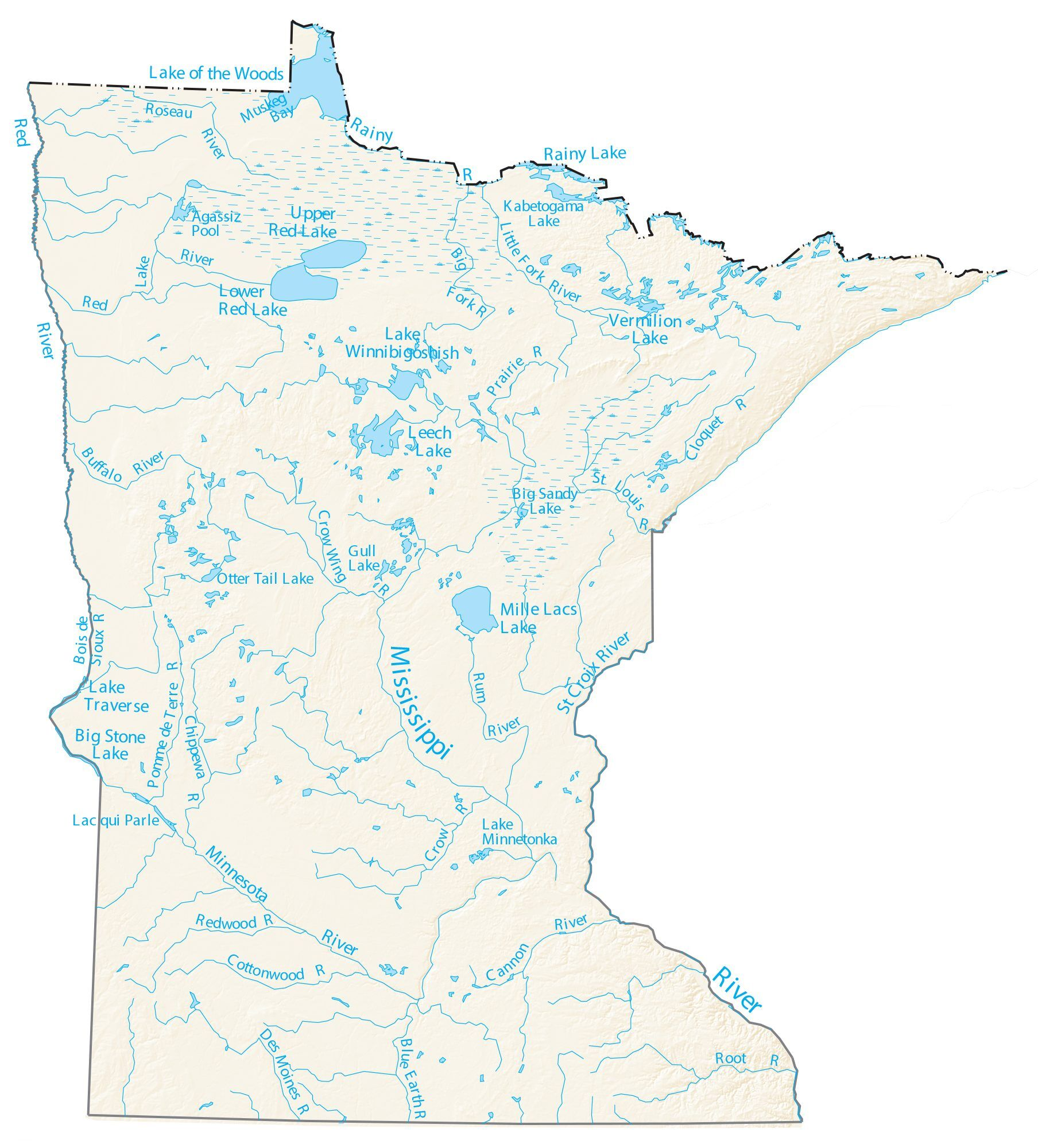

== Gallery ==
Images of selected Minnesota rivers
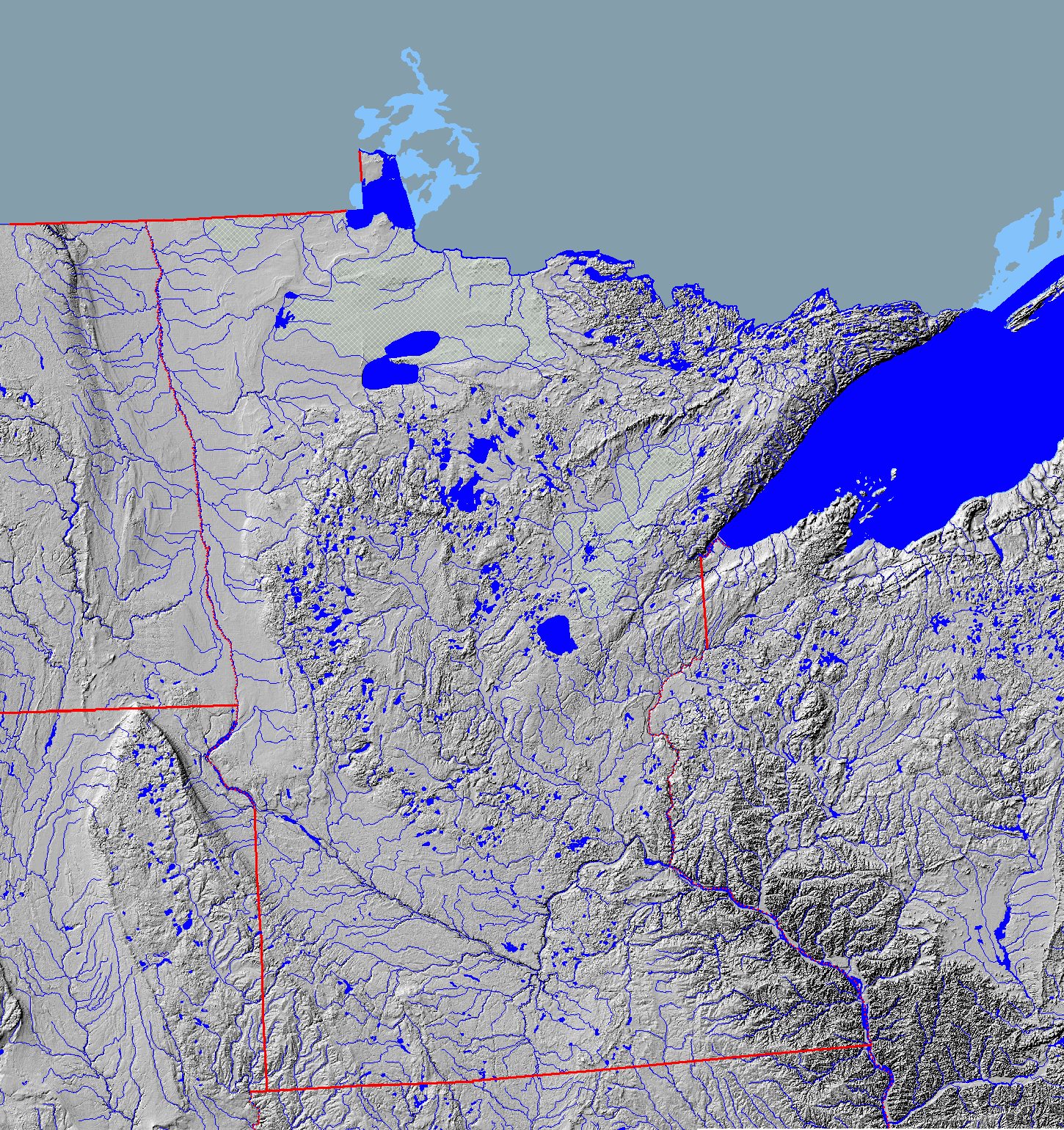
Topographic map of Minnesota streams, lakes and rivers in blue

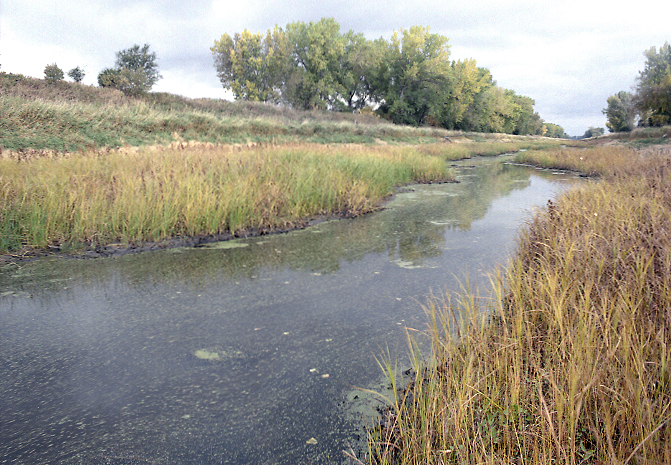
Bois de Sioux River below Lake Traverse dam. Roberts County, South Dakota is at left, and Traverse County, Minnesota is at right.

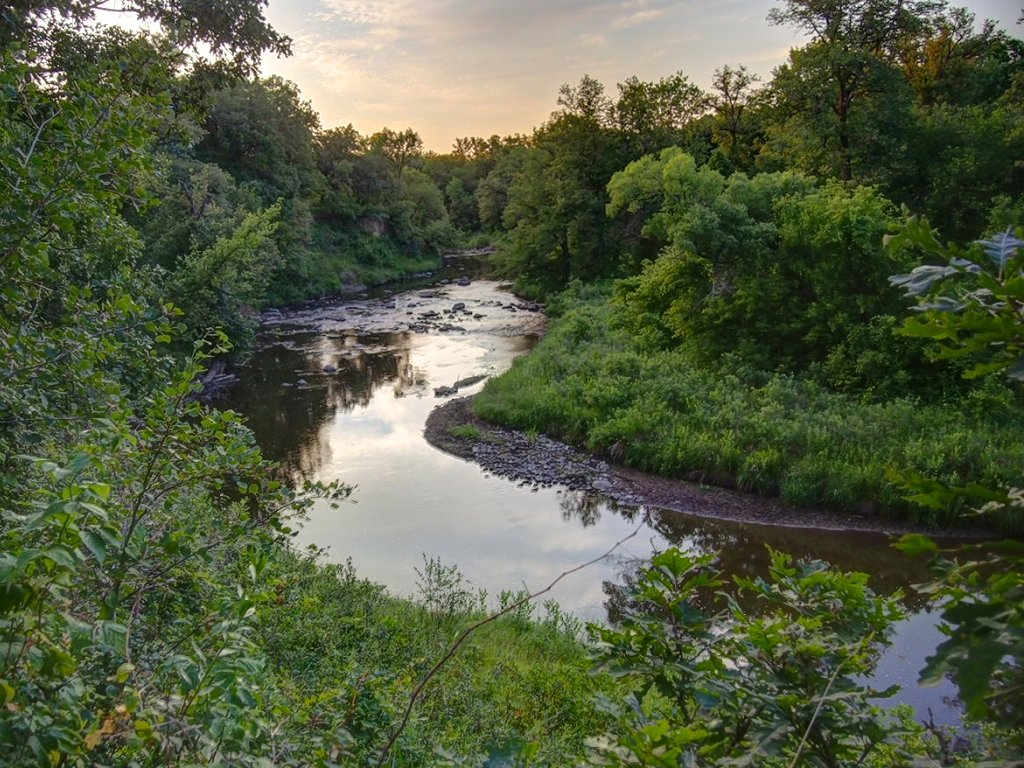
Buffalo River in Buffalo River State Park

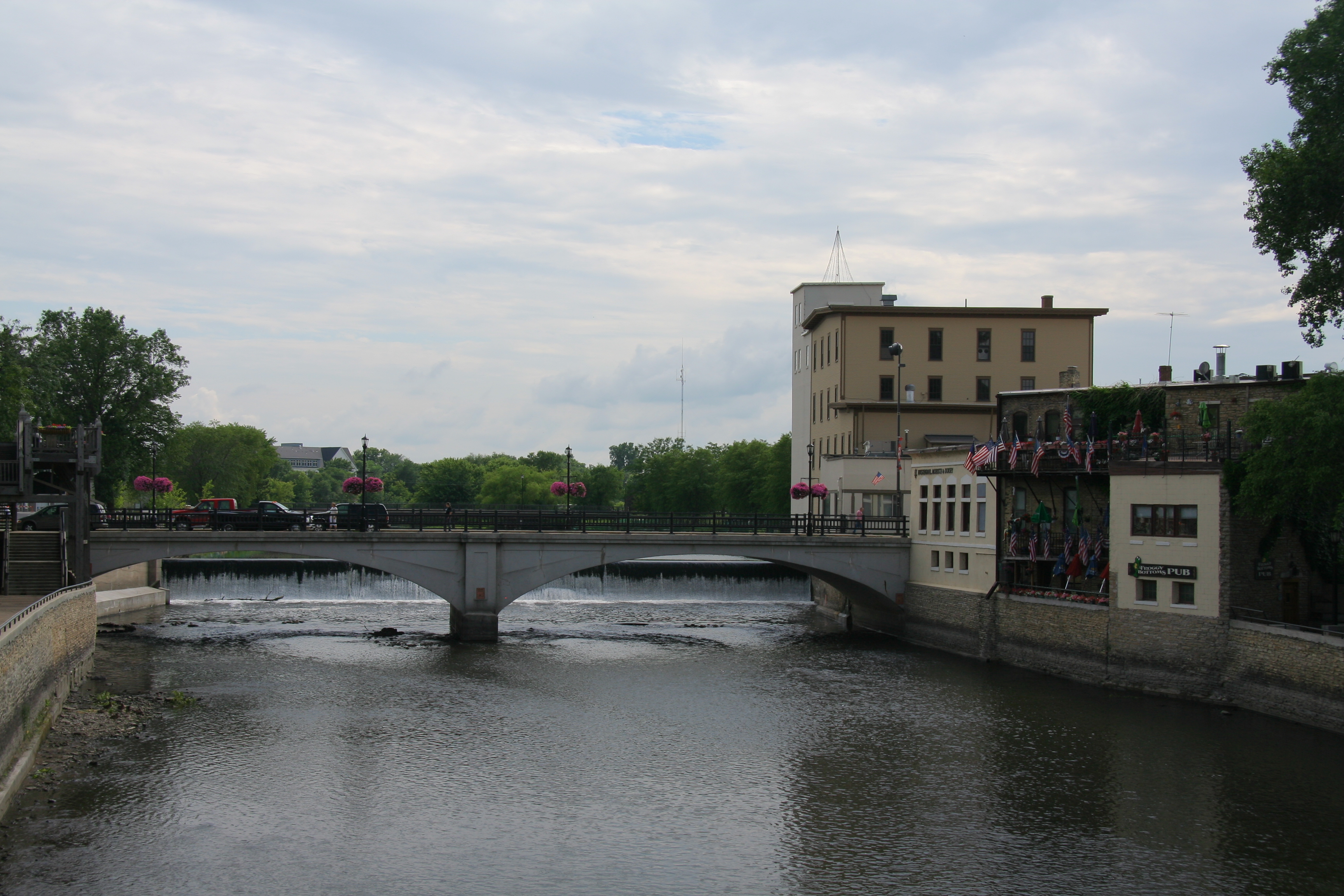
Cannon River in Northfield

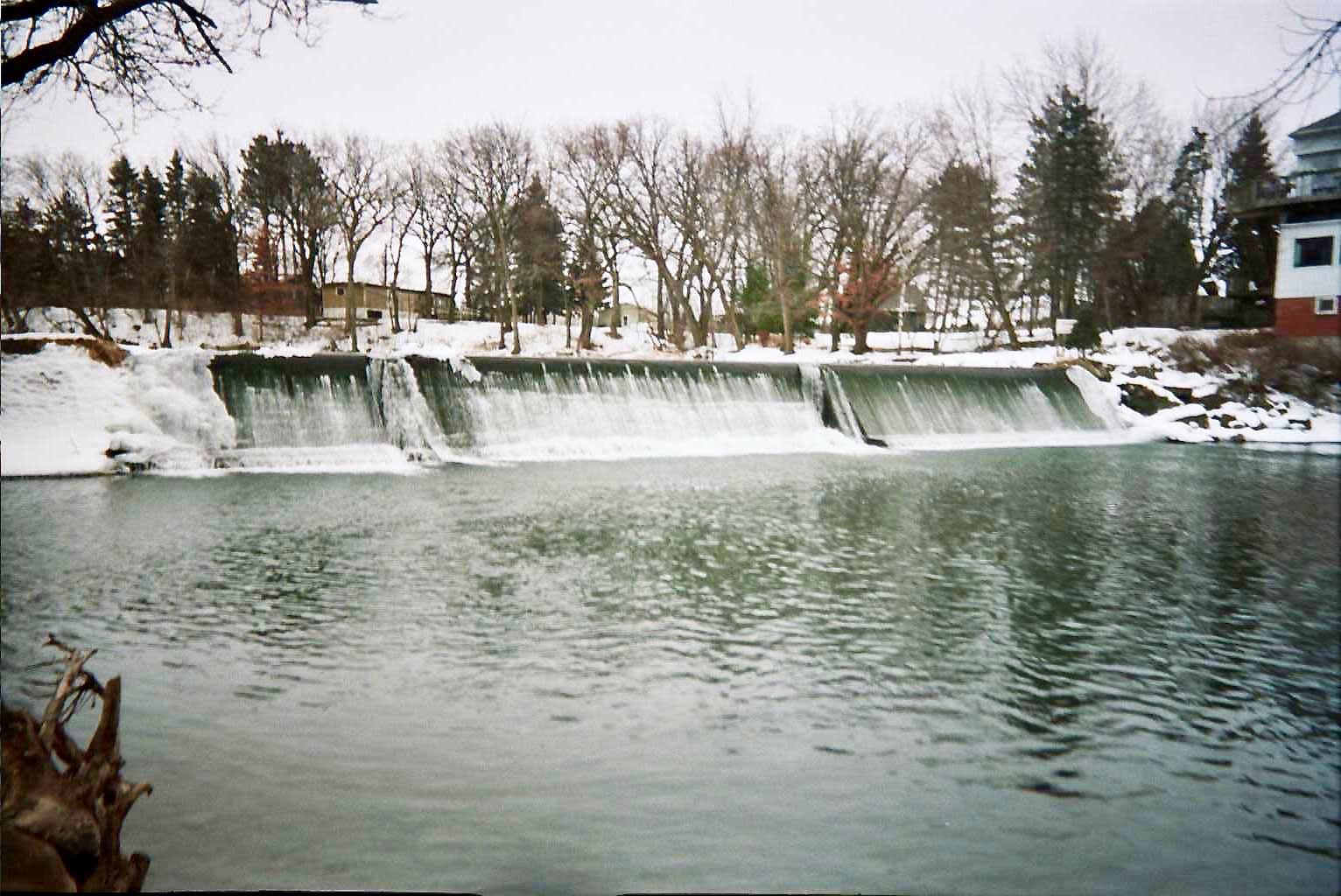
Cedar River near Austin, Minnesota

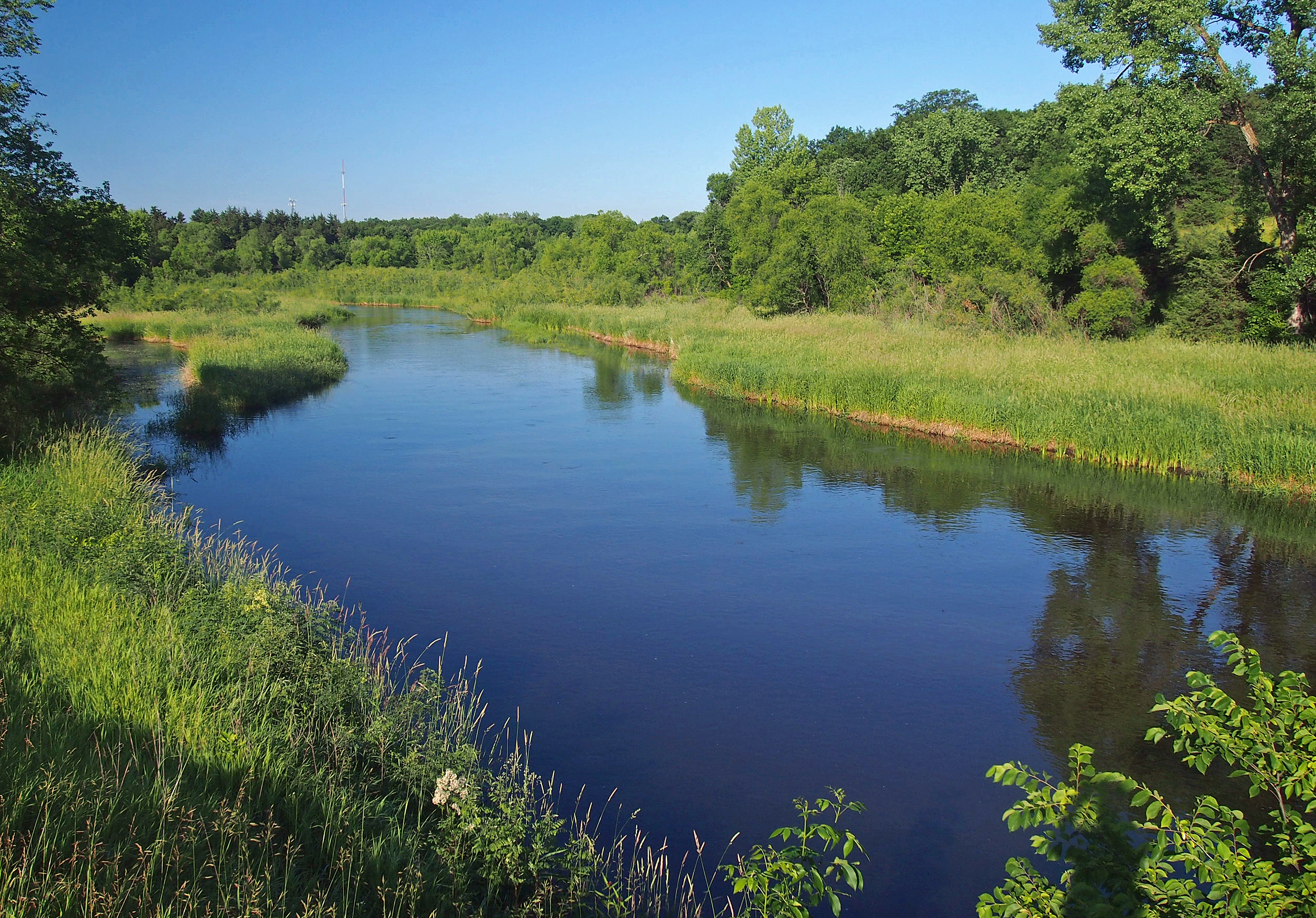
Clearwater River (Mississippi River tributary)

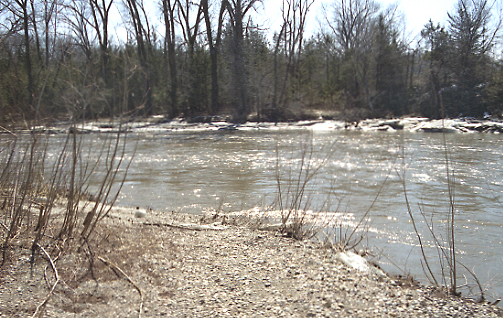
Cobb River in Blue Earth County

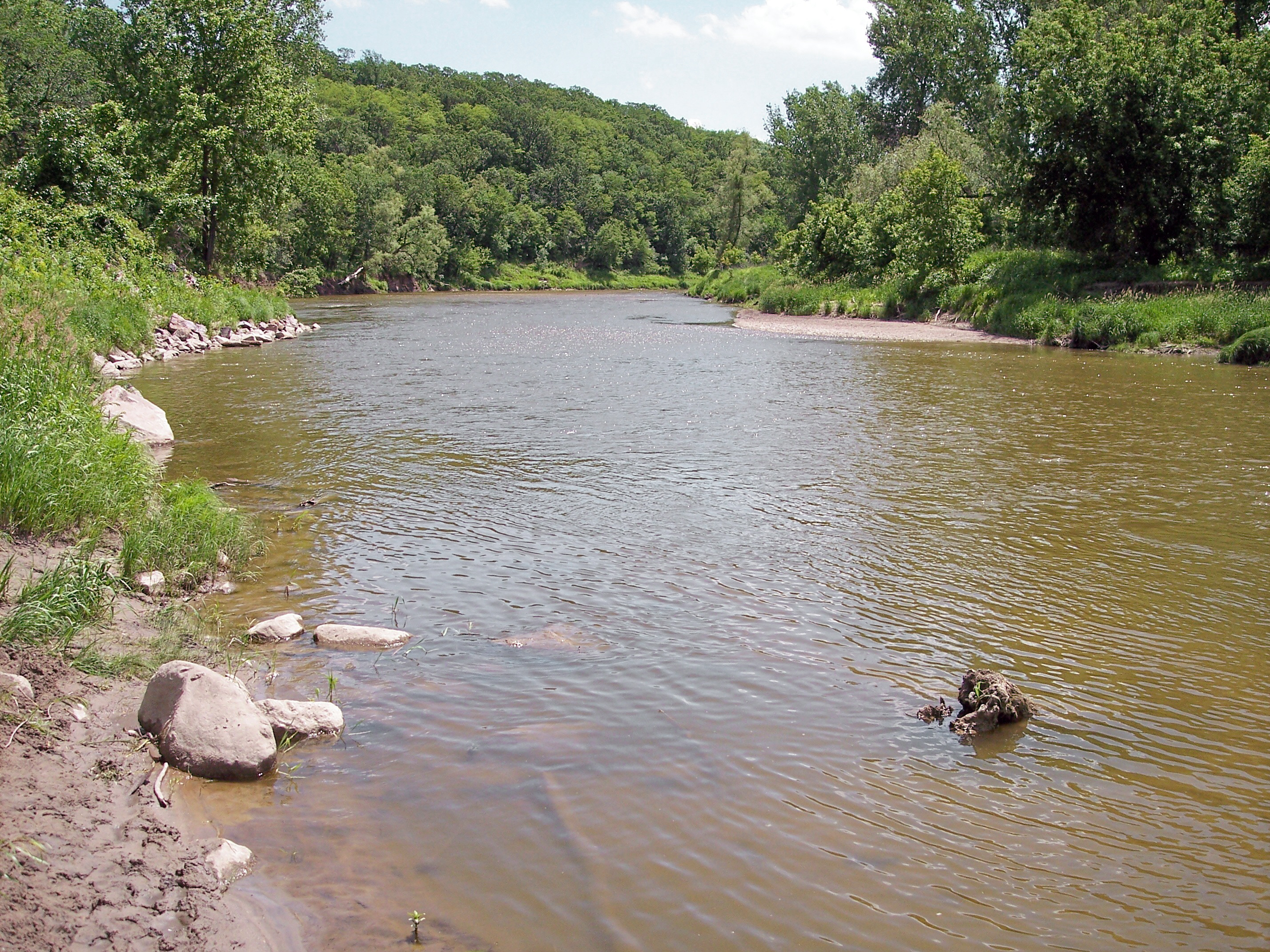
Cottonwood River in Flandrau State Park

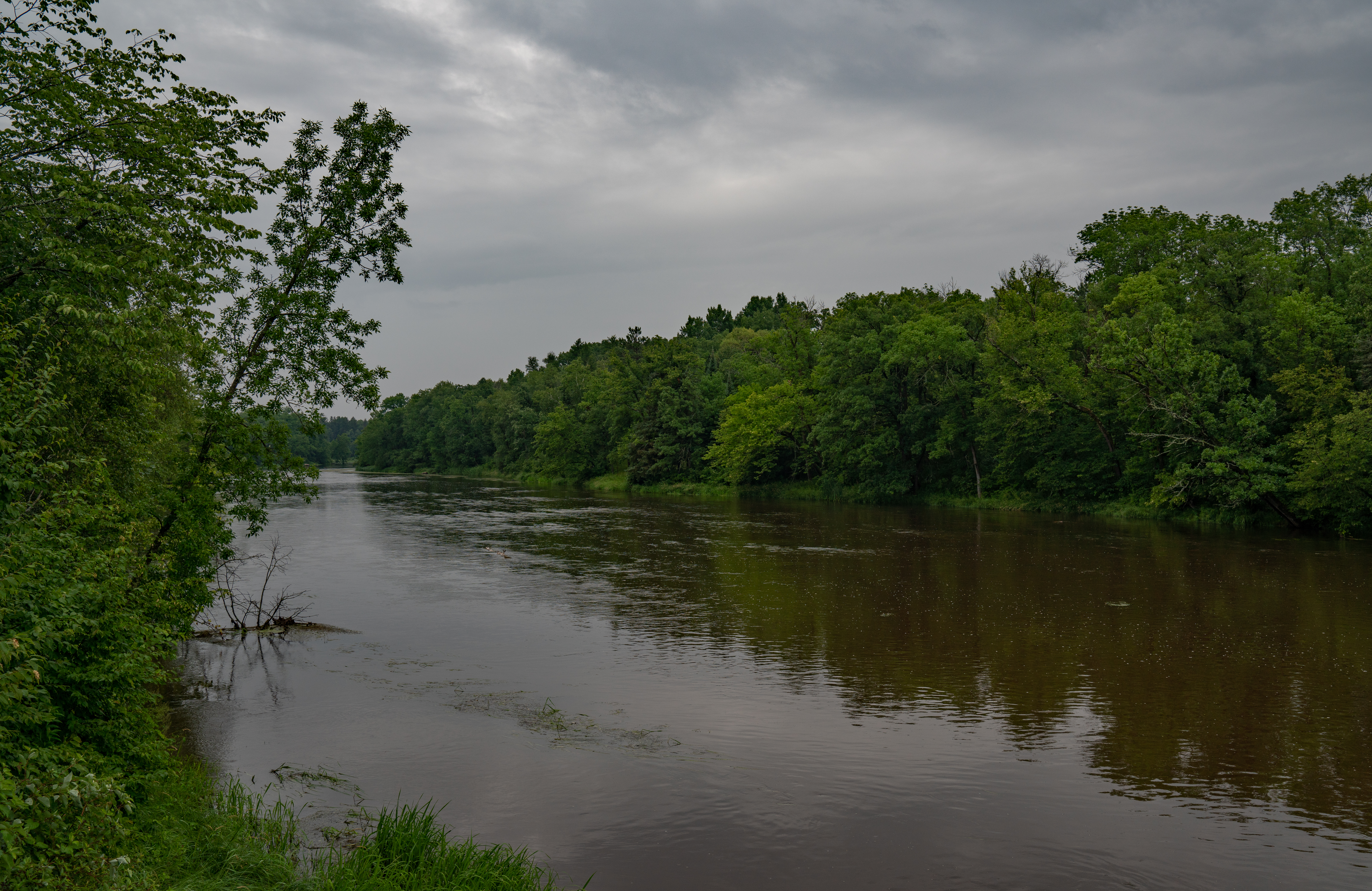
Crow Wing River in Oylen, Wadena County, Minnesota

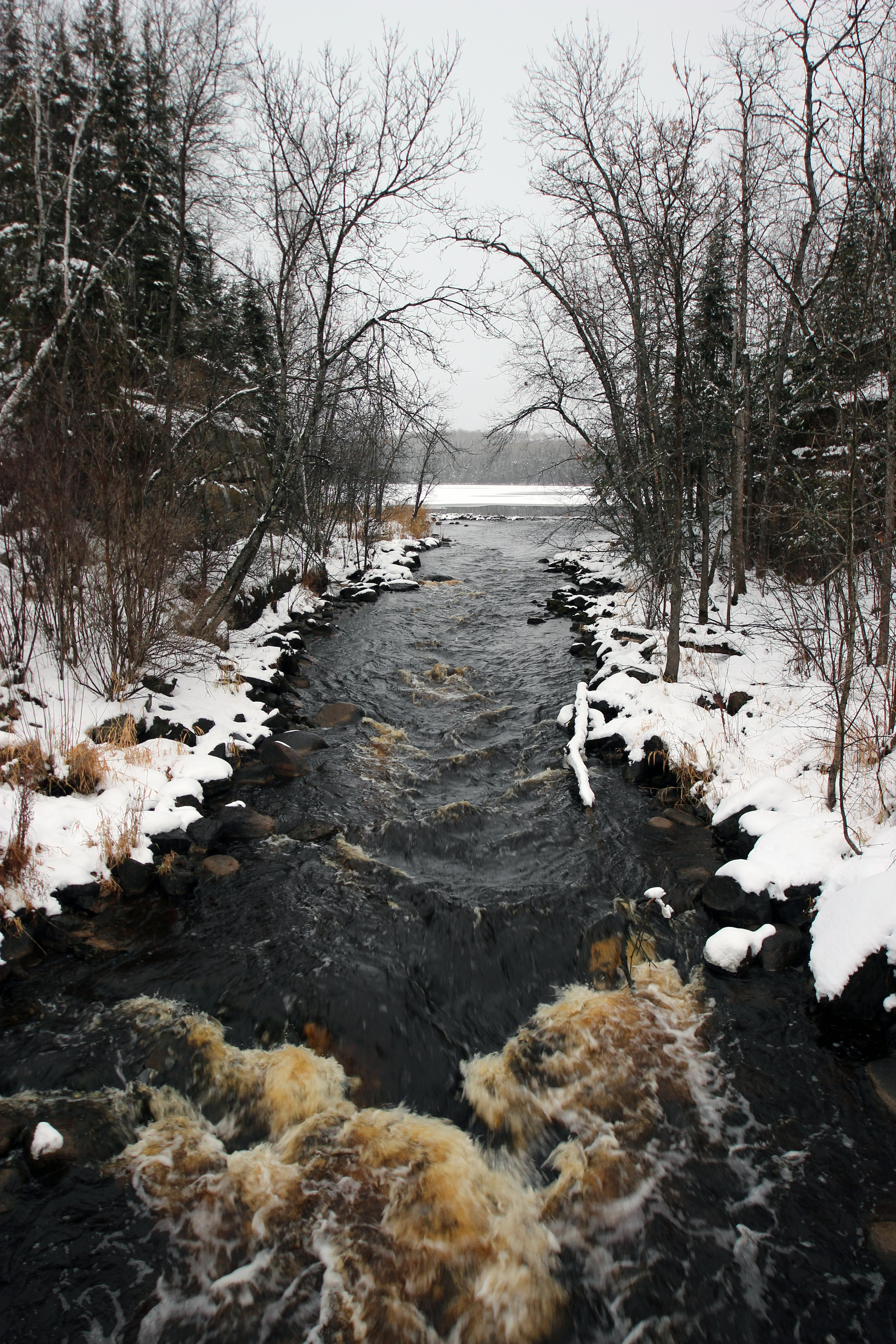
Embarrass River in Winter

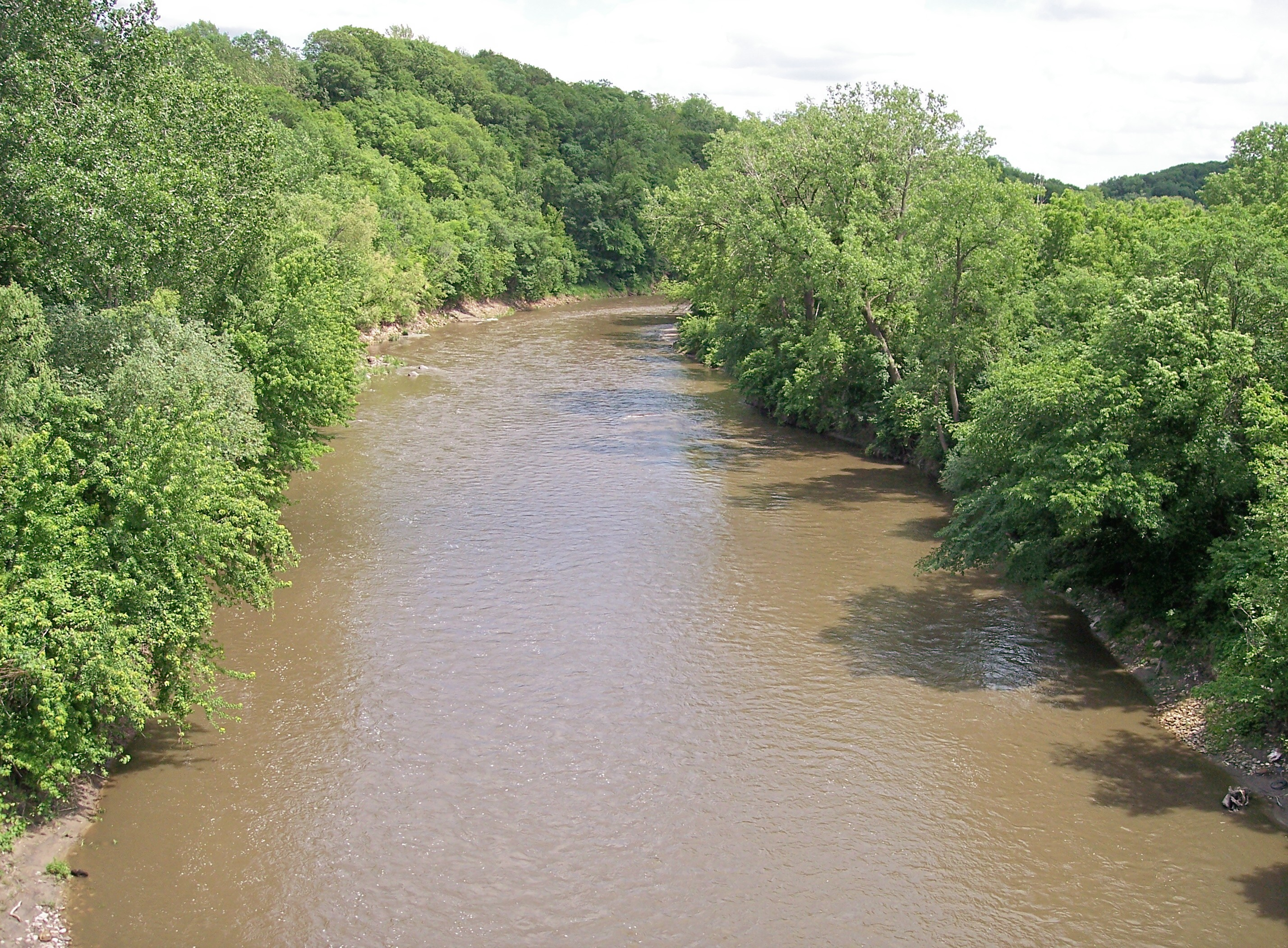
Le Sueur River near Red Jacket trail

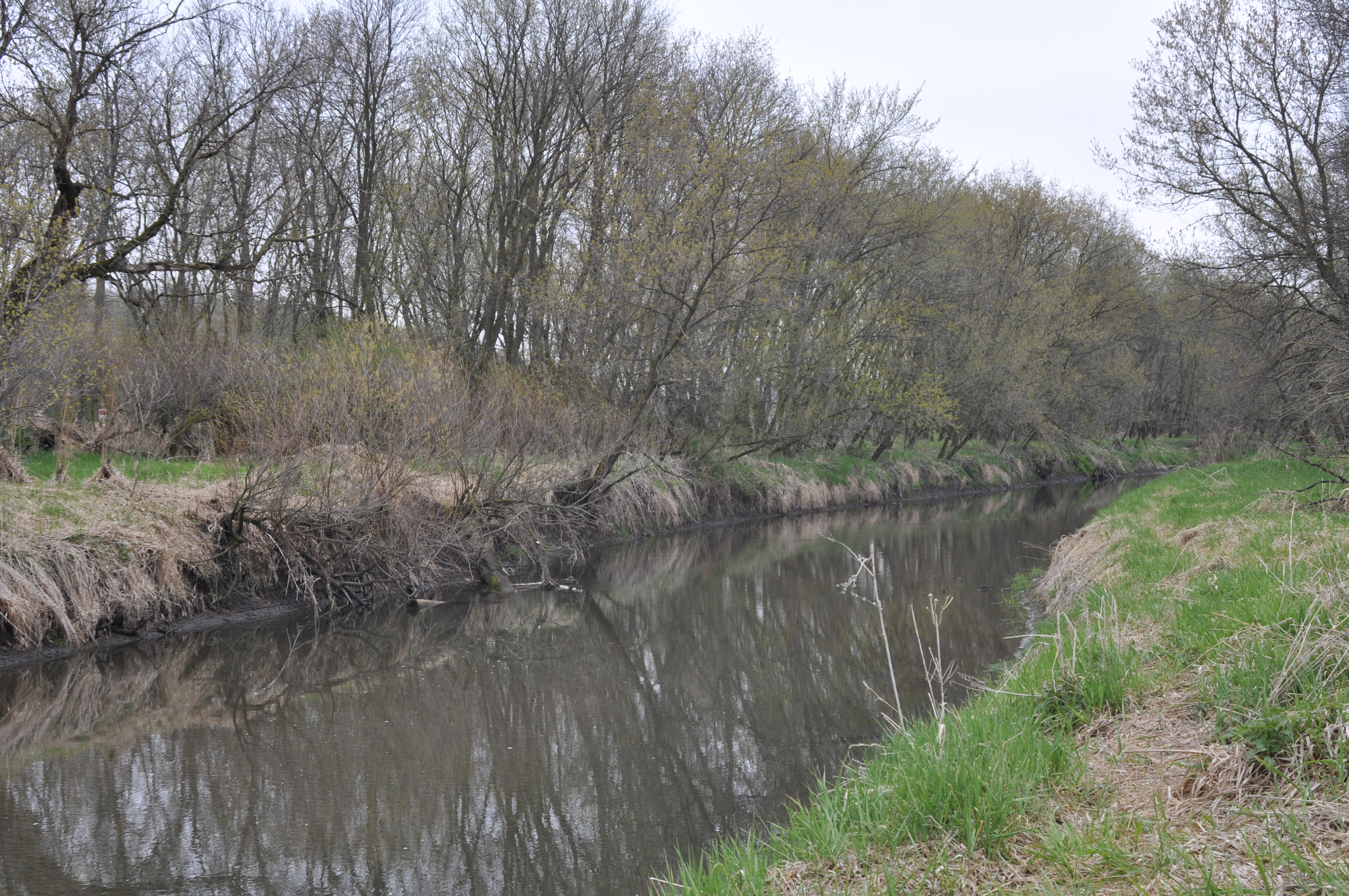
Little Cannon River near Sogn, Minnesota

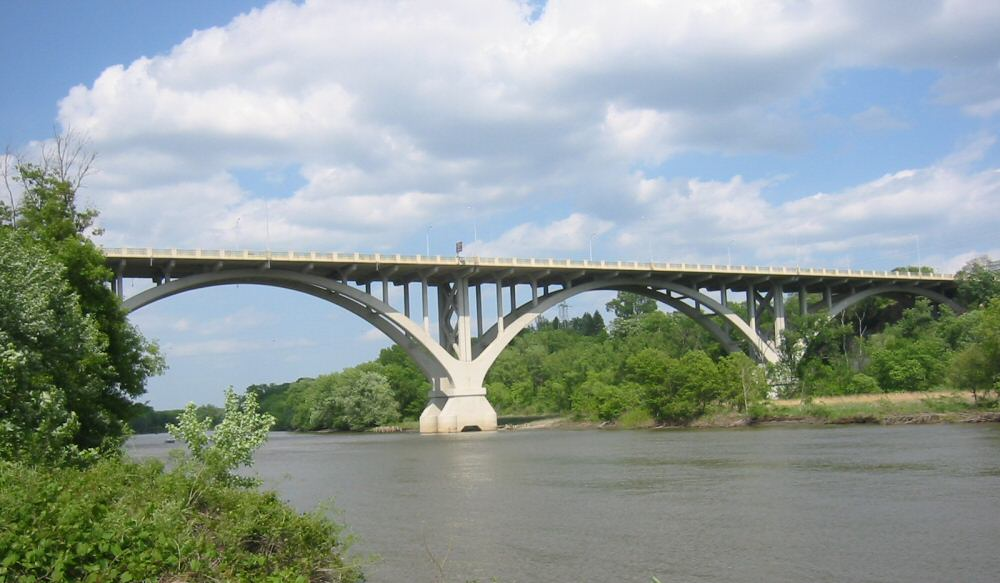
Minnesota River Mendota Heights bridge

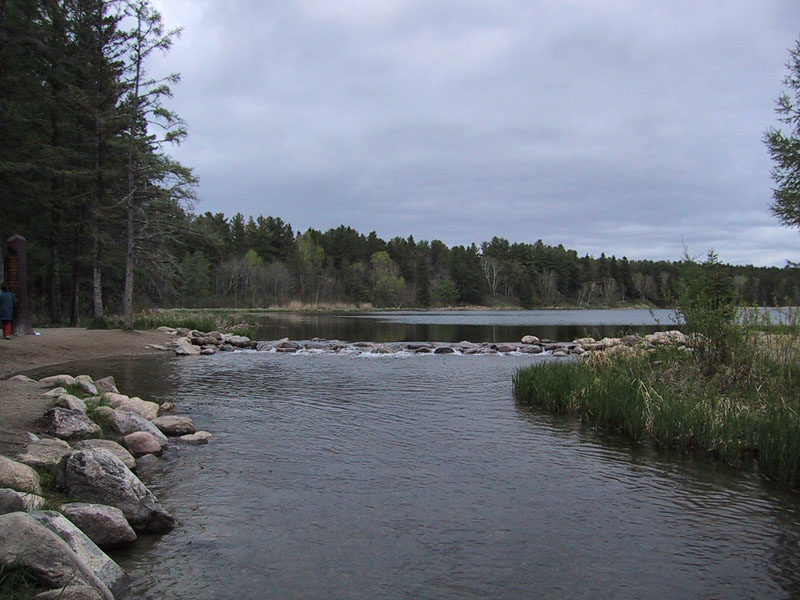
Mississippi River source at Lake Itasca

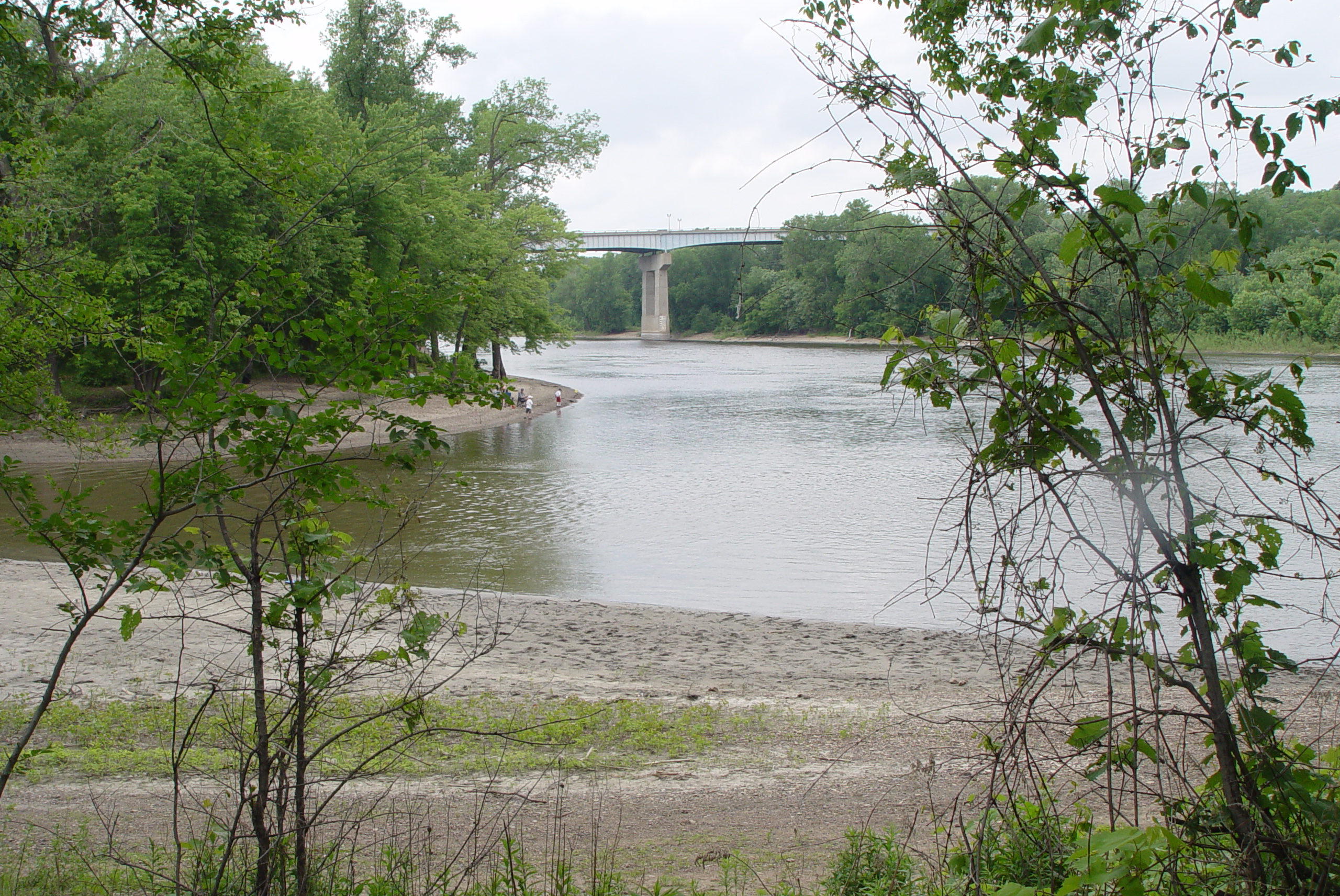
Mississippi River and Minnesota River confluence near Fort Snelling State Park

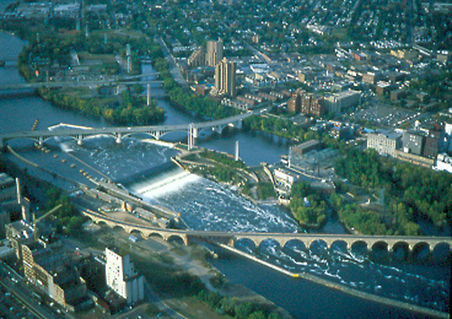
Mississippi River at St. Anthony Falls in Minneapolis

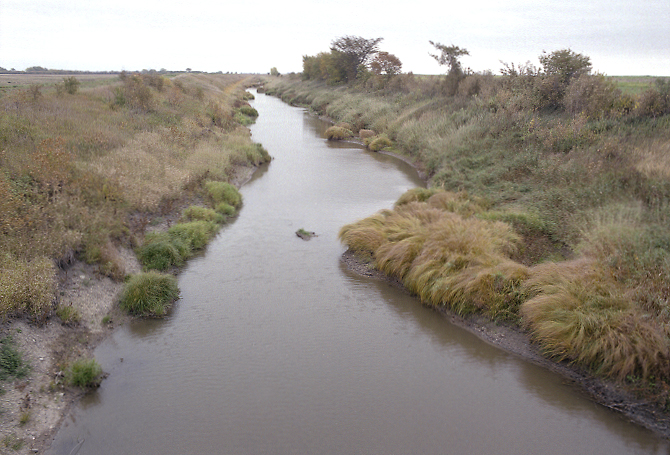
Mustinka River straightened and re-routed section in Redpath Township of Traverse County

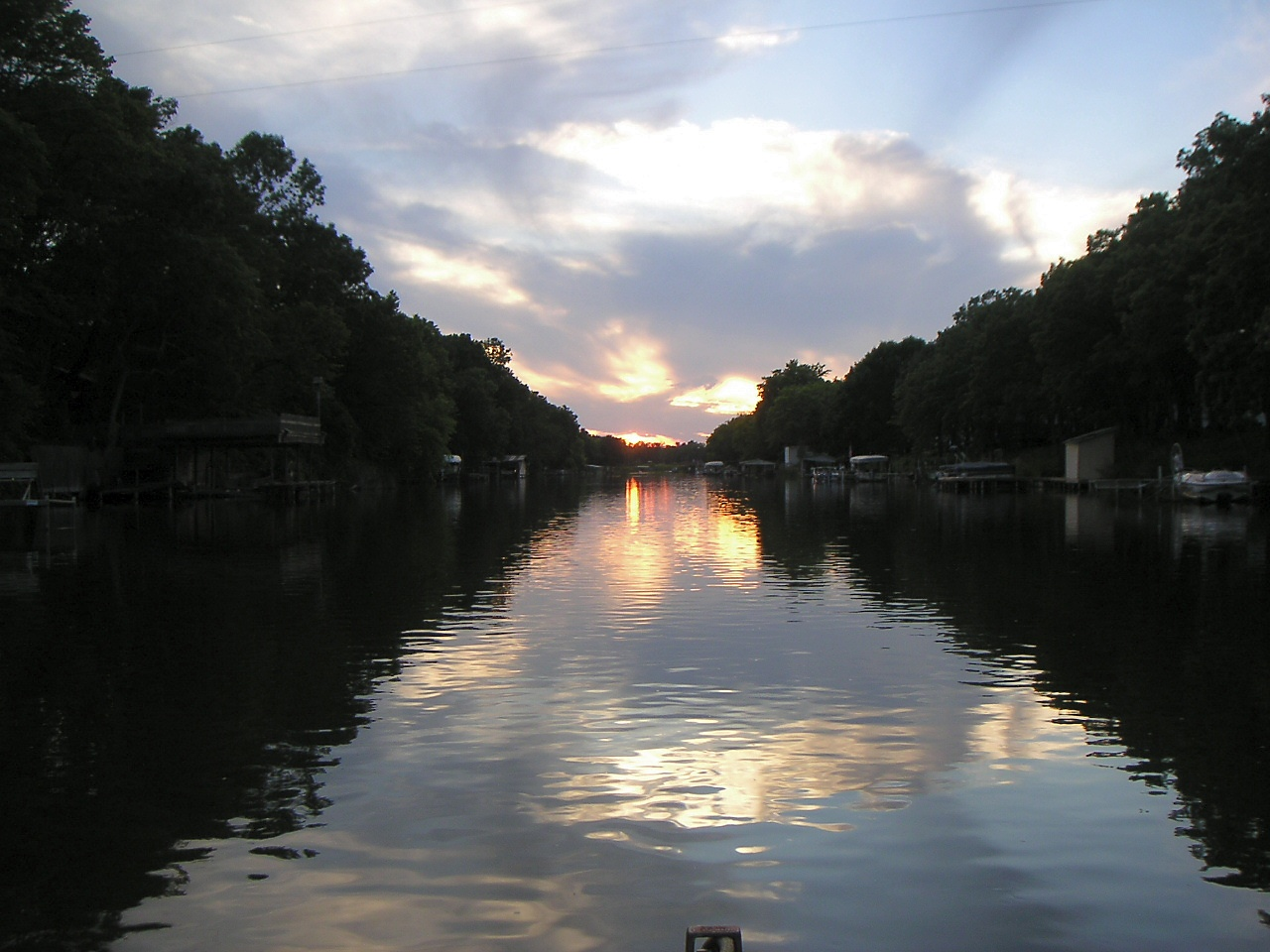
Otter Tail River and sunset near Otter Tail Lake and Ottertail, Minnesota

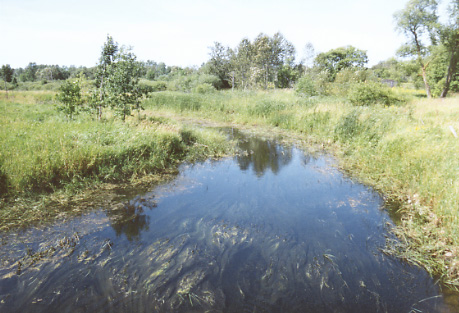
Partridge River at Bartlett Township, Todd County, Minnesota

Pigeon River High Falls at Grand Portage State Park

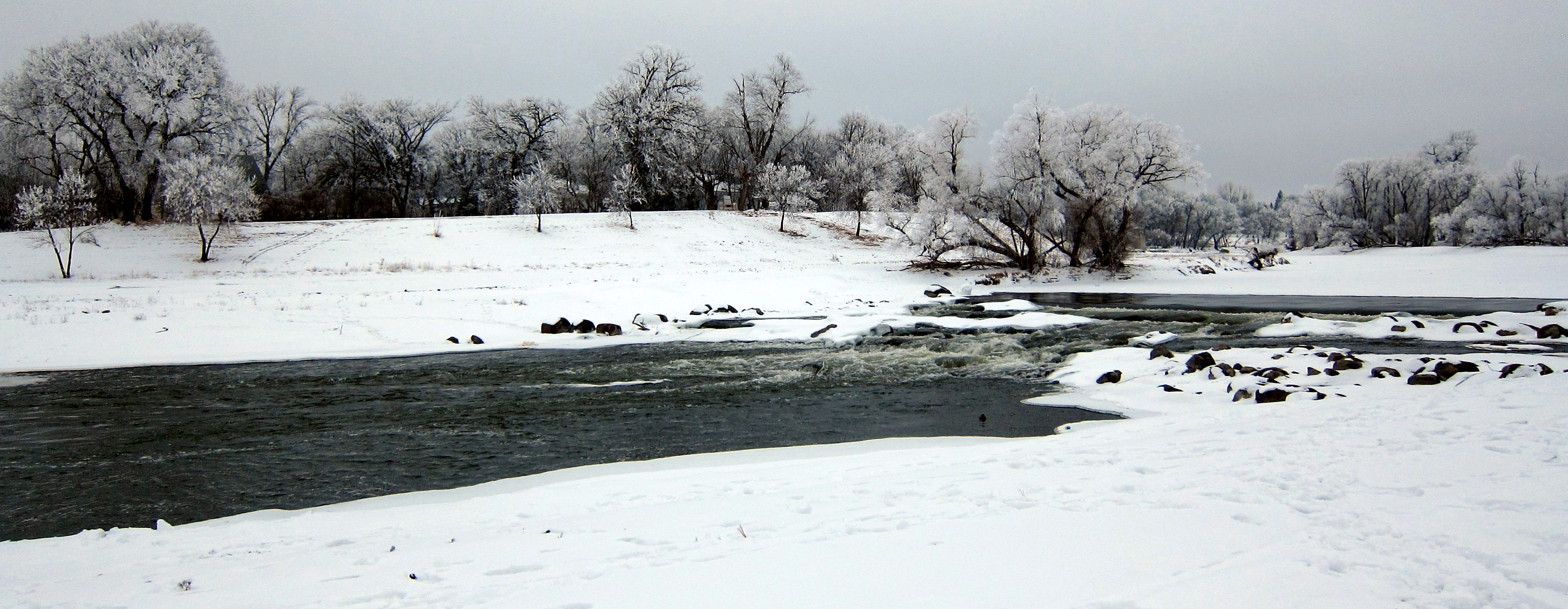
Red River of the North as viewed from Fargo, North Dakota

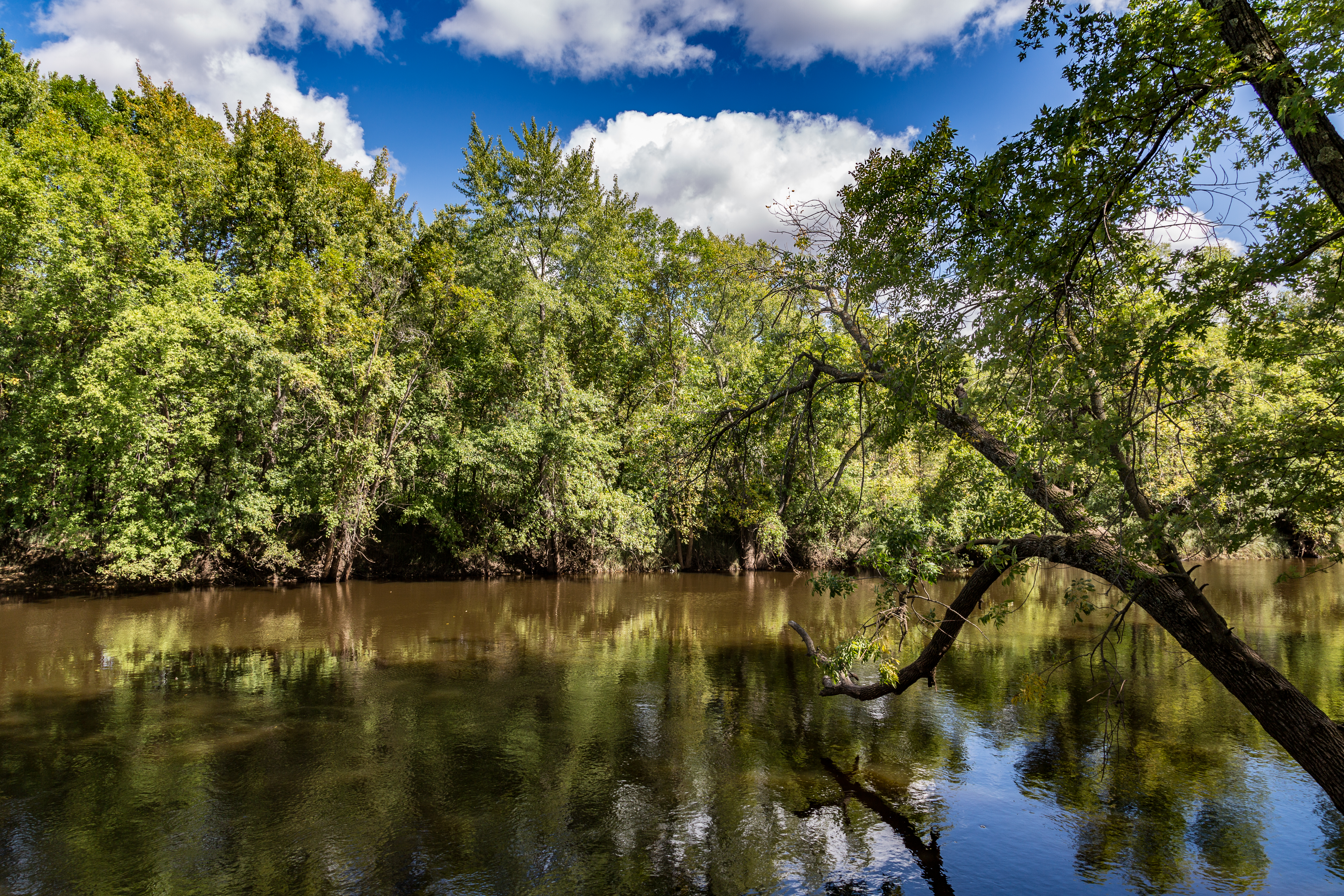
Rum River in Princeton, Minnesota

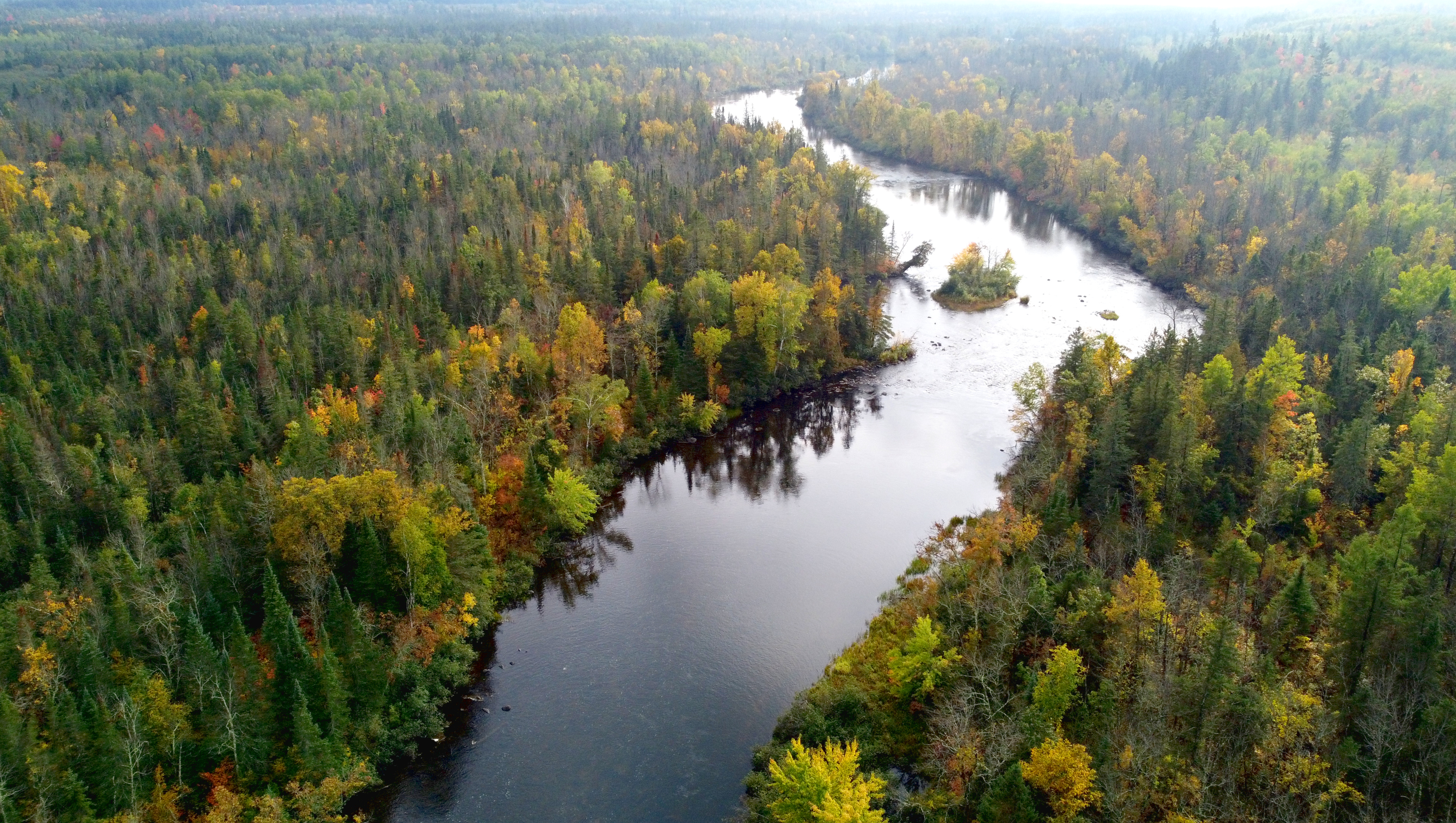
St. Croix River viewed in Wisconsin

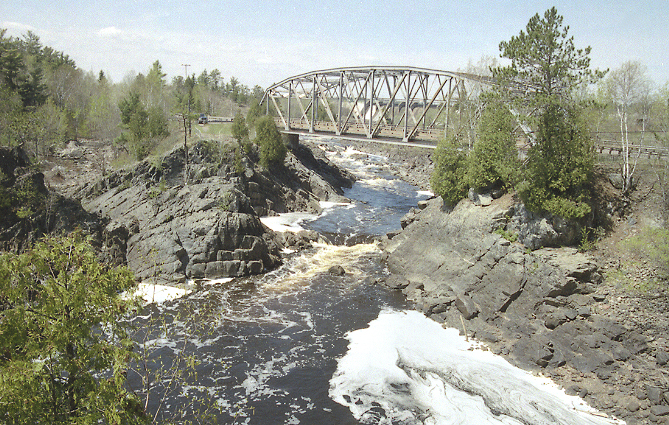
St. Louis River at Thomson, Minnesota

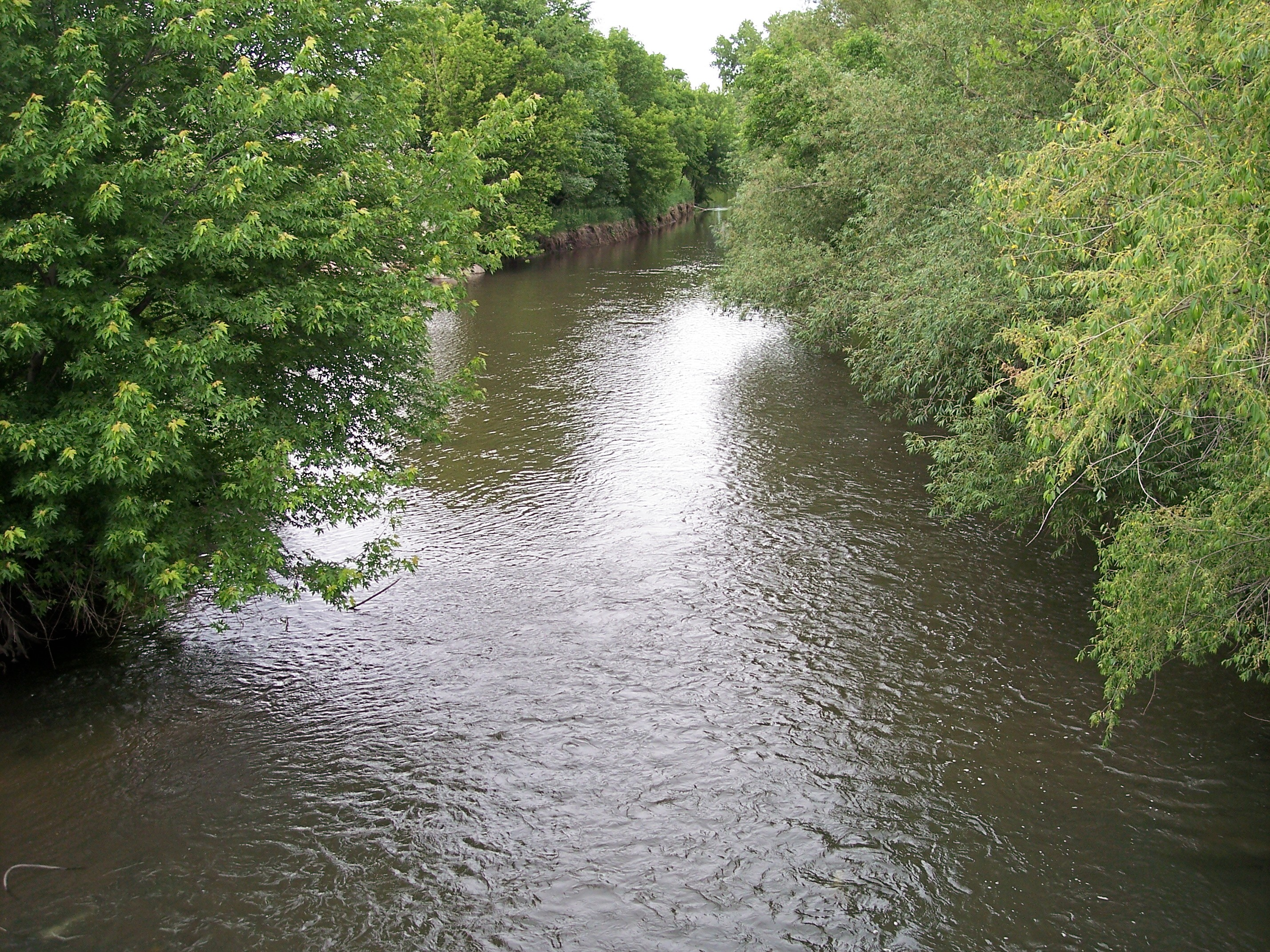
Straight River near Owatonna, Minnesota

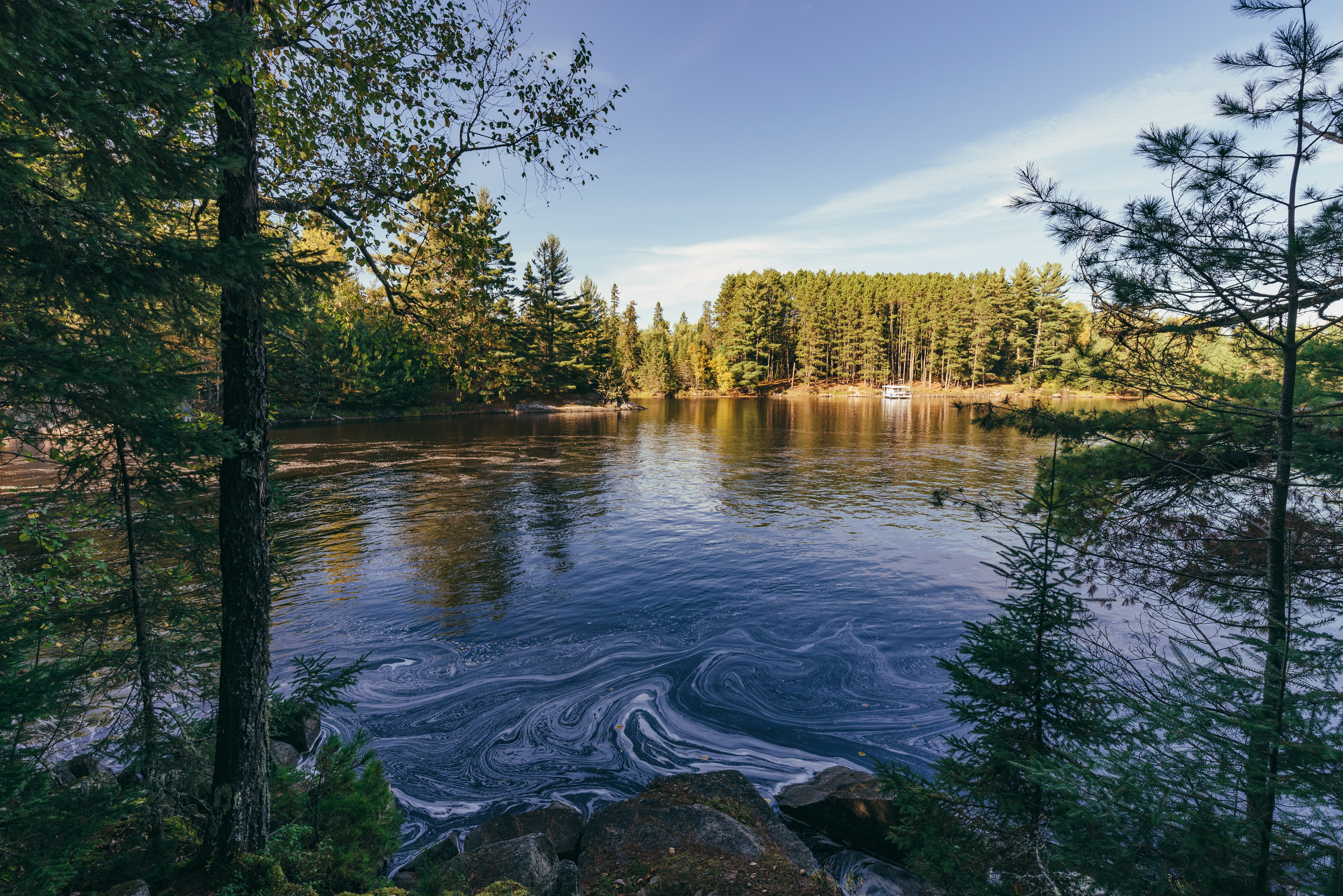
Vermilion River in St. Louis County

== See also ==
- Geography of Minnesota
- List of longest rivers in the United States by state
- List of rivers of Minnesota
- List of rivers of Iowa
- List of rivers of North Dakota
- List of rivers of South Dakota
- List of rivers of Wisconsin
- List of lakes of Minnesota
