= Skunk River =

Skunk River may refer to:

- Skunk River (Iowa), river in Iowa
- Skunk River (Platte River), river in Minnesota
