= Buffalo River (Minnesota) =

River in Minnesota, United States of America

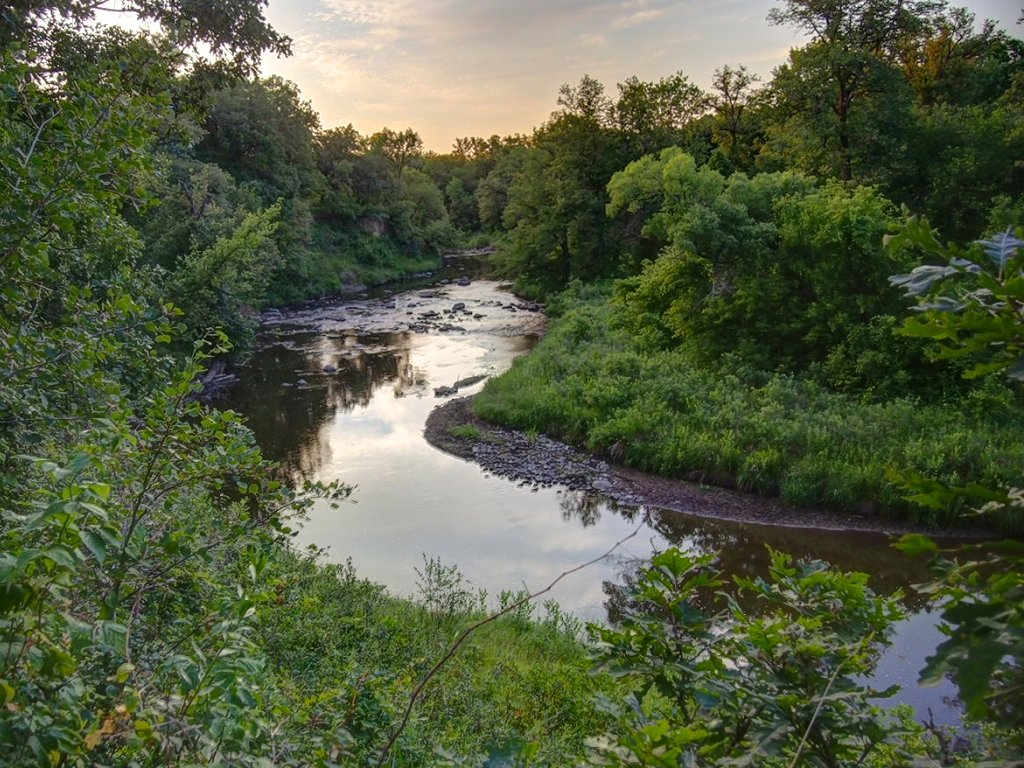
- The Buffalo River in Buffalo River State Park

- Mouth of the Buffalo River

Location
- Country: United States
- State: Minnesota
- Counties: Clay, Becker

Physical characteristics
- Source
  - location: Tamarac Lake
  - coordinates: 46.9196814°N 95.6850401°W
- Mouth
  - location: Red River of the North near Georgetown, Minnesota
  - elevation: 853 feet (260 m)
- Length: 139 miles (224 km)
- Basin size: 1,189 square miles (3,080 km^{2})

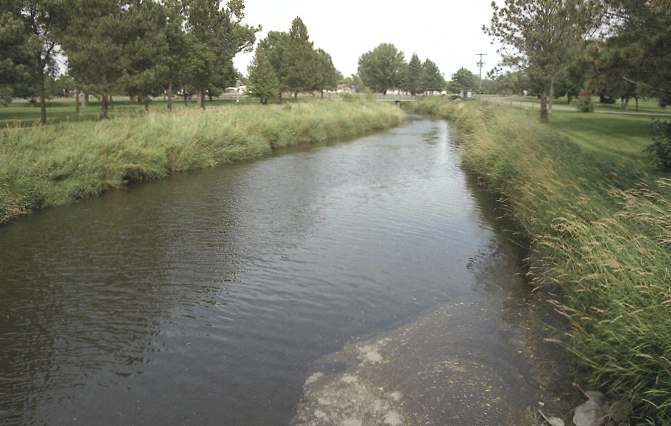
The Buffalo River in Hawley

The Buffalo River is a 139-mile-long (224 km) tributary of the Red River of the North in western Minnesota in the United States. Via the Red River, Lake Winnipeg and the Nelson River, it is part of the watershed of Hudson Bay. The river drains an area of 1,189 square miles (3,080 km^{2}).

== Course ==
The Buffalo River flows from Tamarac Lake in the Tamarac National Wildlife Refuge in central Becker County and flows generally westwardly into Clay County, past the towns of Hawley and Georgetown and through Buffalo River State Park. It flows into the Red River about 1 mile (2 km) west of Georgetown.

The river's largest tributary is the 71.8-mile-long (115.6 km) South Branch Buffalo River, which rises in western Otter Tail County and flows initially westward into northern Wilkin County, then northward into Clay County. It joins the main stem of the river near Glyndon, Minnesota.

== See also ==
- List of Minnesota rivers
- List of longest streams of Minnesota
