= Little Cannon River (Cannon River tributary) =

River in Goodhue County, Minnesota, United States of America

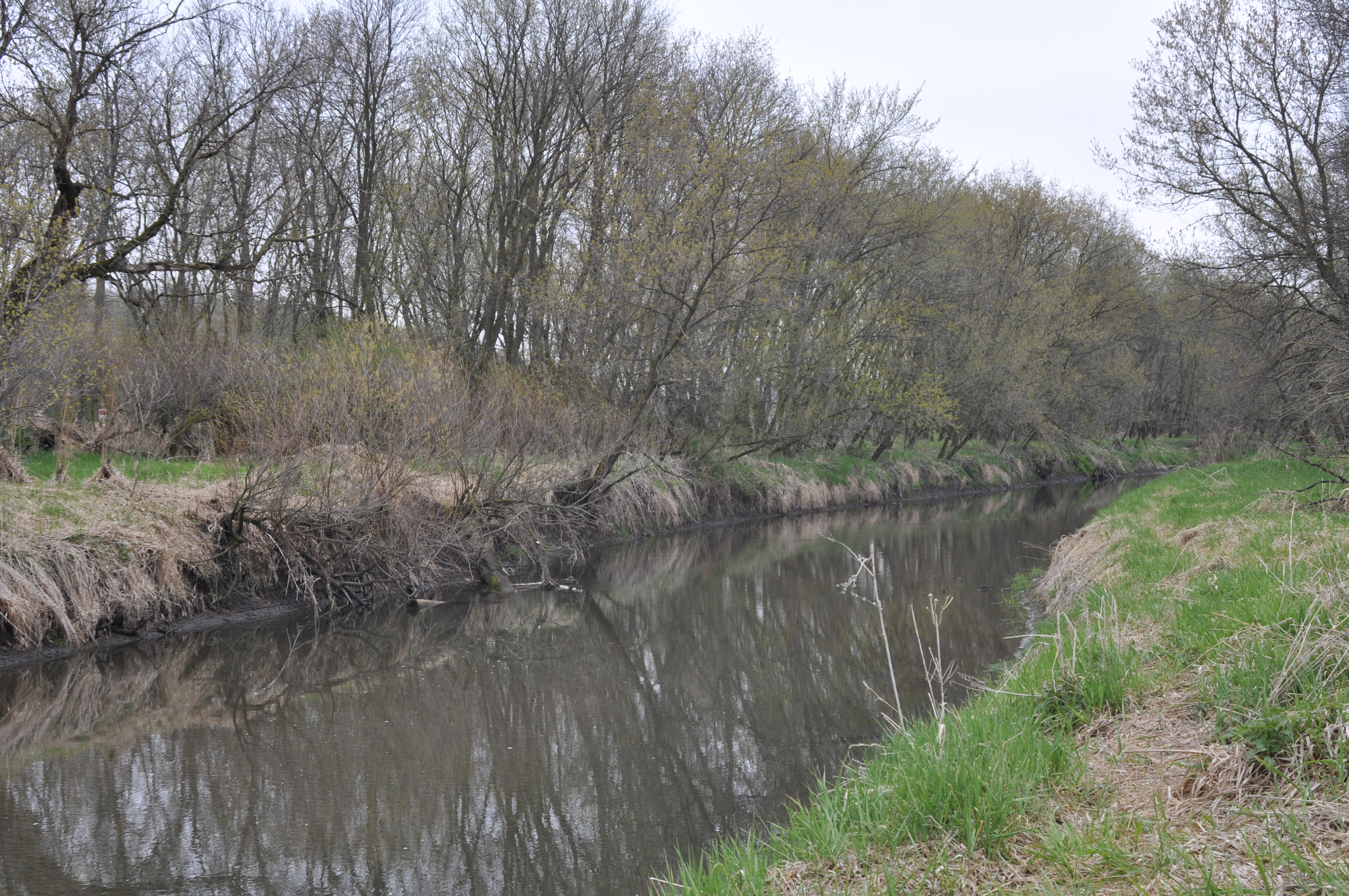
- Little Cannon River near Sogn, Minnesota

- Location within Minnesota Location within the United States
- Native name: Canot (French)

Location
- Country: United States
- State: Minnesota
- Counties: Goodhue County, Rice County

Physical characteristics
- Source
  - location: Nerstrand, Minnesota
  - coordinates: 44.3177425°N 93.0785435°W
- Mouth: Cannon River
  - location: Cannon Falls, Minnesota
  - coordinates: 44.5121892°N 92.9054840°W
  - elevation: 781 ft (238 m)
- Length: 30.6-mile-long (49.2 km)
- Basin size: 85 square miles

Basin features
- River system: Cannon River
- Waterfalls: Cannon River Dam

The Little Cannon River is a 30.6-mile-long (49.2 km) river of Minnesota in the United States. It flows into the Cannon River at the city of Cannon Falls. A section of the Little Cannon River south of Sogn, Minnesota is a designated trout stream by the Minnesota Department of Natural Resources.

== Description ==
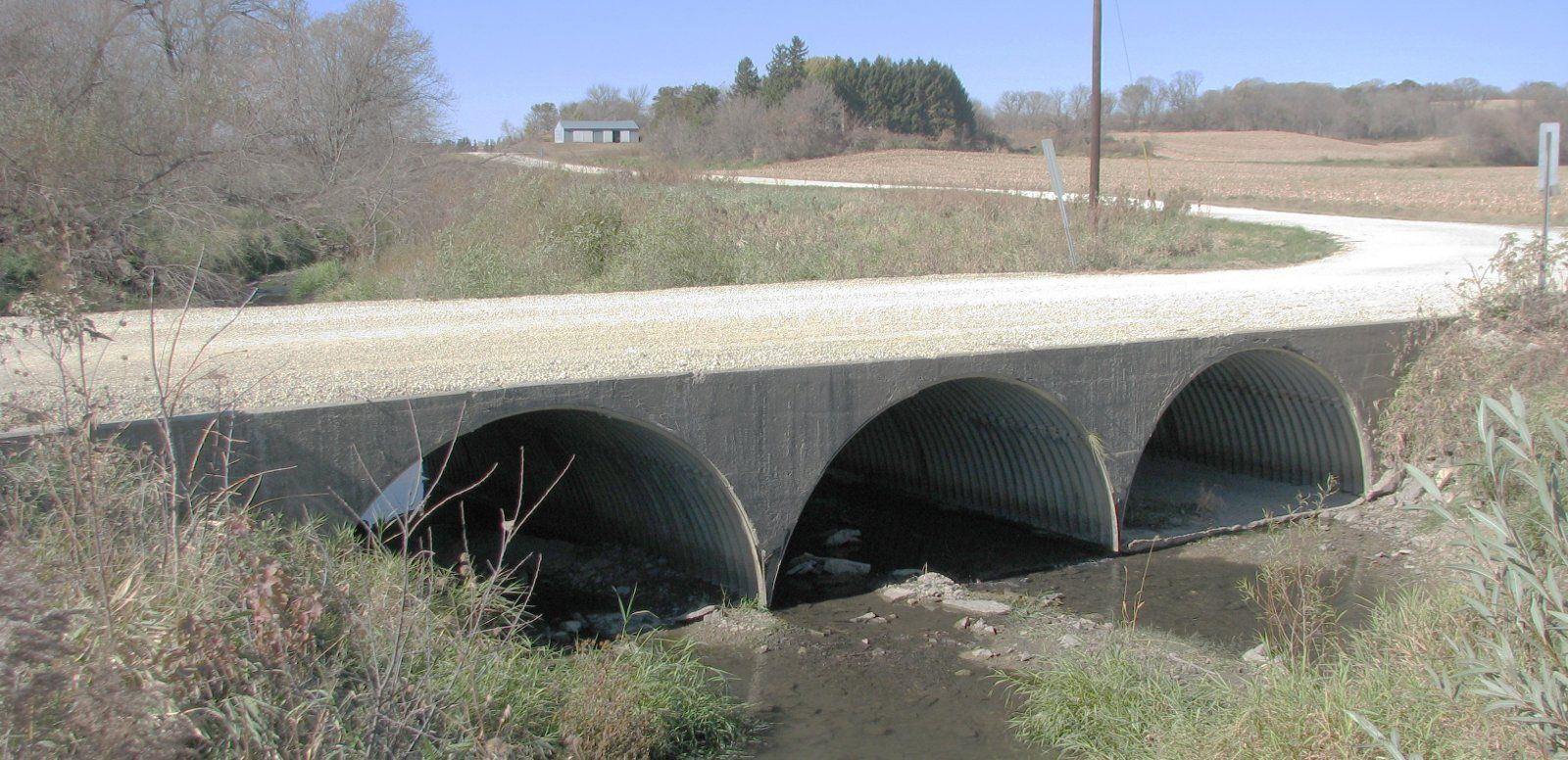
Bridge over the Little Cannon River near Nerstrand, Minnesota

The Cannon River and Little Cannon River names came from a mispronunciation of the original French explorers name for the river, "Canot".

There was a dam on the Little Cannon River in Goodhue County (44.5083003°N 92.9068730°W). The ruins of the Archibald Mill dam are located on the Little Cannon River. The dam was removed in 2001.

There is a cemetery called the Little Cannon Cemetery north of Kenyon, Minnesota (44.3269941°N 92.9813490°W).

The Little Cannon River is a state designated canoe stream.

The Minnesota Department of Natural Resources stocks the Little Cannon River with brown and rainbow trout.

== See also ==
- List of rivers of Minnesota
- List of longest streams of Minnesota
