= Partridge River (St. Louis River tributary) =

- Mouth of the Partridge River

Location
- Country: United States
- State: Minnesota
- County: St. Louis County

Physical characteristics
- Source
  - location: Babbitt
  - coordinates: 47.6376974°N 91.9857185°W
- Mouth
  - location: Turpela Lake
  - coordinates: 47°29′36″N 92°13′44″W

Basin features
- River system: Saint Louis River

The Partridge River is a 37.0-mile-long (59.5 km) tributary of the Saint Louis River in northern Minnesota, United States. It rises south of the city of Babbitt and takes a winding course primarily to the southwest, passing north of the city of Hoyt Lakes and joining the St. Louis River south of Aurora.

== See also ==
- List of rivers of Minnesota
- List of longest streams of Minnesota
