= Caldwell Brook =

- Caldwell Brook Mouth

Location
- Country: United States
- State: Minnesota
- County: Koochiching County, Itasca County

Physical characteristics
- Source
  - coordinates: 47.8766222°N 94.2229994°W
- Mouth
  - coordinates: 47.9805039°N 93.8182481°W
- Length: 50 mi (80 km)

Caldwell Brook is a stream in the U.S. state of Minnesota.

Caldwell Brook was named for an early settler.

== See also ==
- List of rivers of Minnesota
- List of longest streams of Minnesota
