= Hungry Jack Lake =

Lake in Minnesota, United States

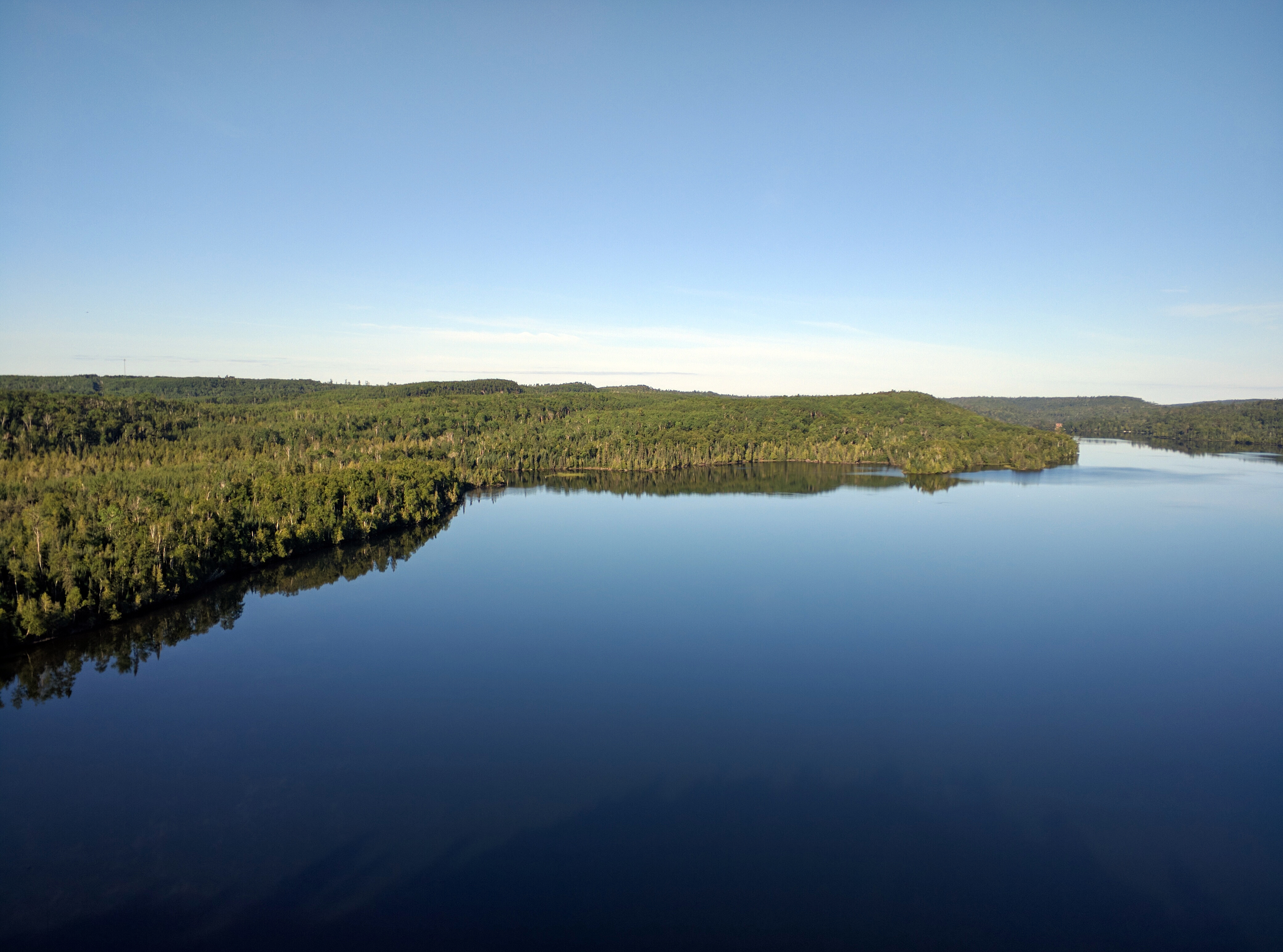
- Hungry Jack Lake in 2016

- Location within Minnesota Location within the United States
- Interactive map of Hungry Jack Lake
- Location: Cook County, Minnesota
- Coordinates: 48°3′30″N 90°26′10″W
- Surface area: 463 acres (1.87 km^{2})
- Max. depth: 71 feet (22 m)
- Surface elevation: 1,680 feet (510 m)

Hungry Jack Lake is a lake in Cook County, Minnesota, in the United States. The lake is 463 acres (1.87 km^{2}) with a maximum depth of 71 feet (22 m) and found at an elevation of 1,680 feet (510 m).

Hungry Jack Lake was putatively named for Anderson Jackson Scott, a surveyor's assistant who at this lake was temporarily without food supplies.

== See also ==
- List of lakes in Minnesota
