= Shakopee Creek =

Coordinates: 45°12′17″N 95°39′49″W

Location
- Country: United States

Physical characteristics
- Source
  - location: Minnesota

Shakopee Creek is a 48.6-mile-long (78.2 km) tributary of the Chippewa River of Minnesota, United States. It is part of the Minnesota River drainage basin, flowing to the Mississippi River. It rises in Kandiyohi County at the outlet of Andrew Lake, with its major headwaters being an outlet from Games Lake about 7 miles (11 km) west northwest of New London. From Andrew it flows westerly into Swift County, where it passes near Kerkhoven. The creek briefly dips southward into Chippewa County, then reenters Swift County and continues to its mouth at the Chippewa River, 8 miles (13 km) southwest of Benson.

Shakopee is derived from the Sioux-language word meaning "six".

== See also ==
- List of rivers of Minnesota
