= Buffalo River State Park (Minnesota) =

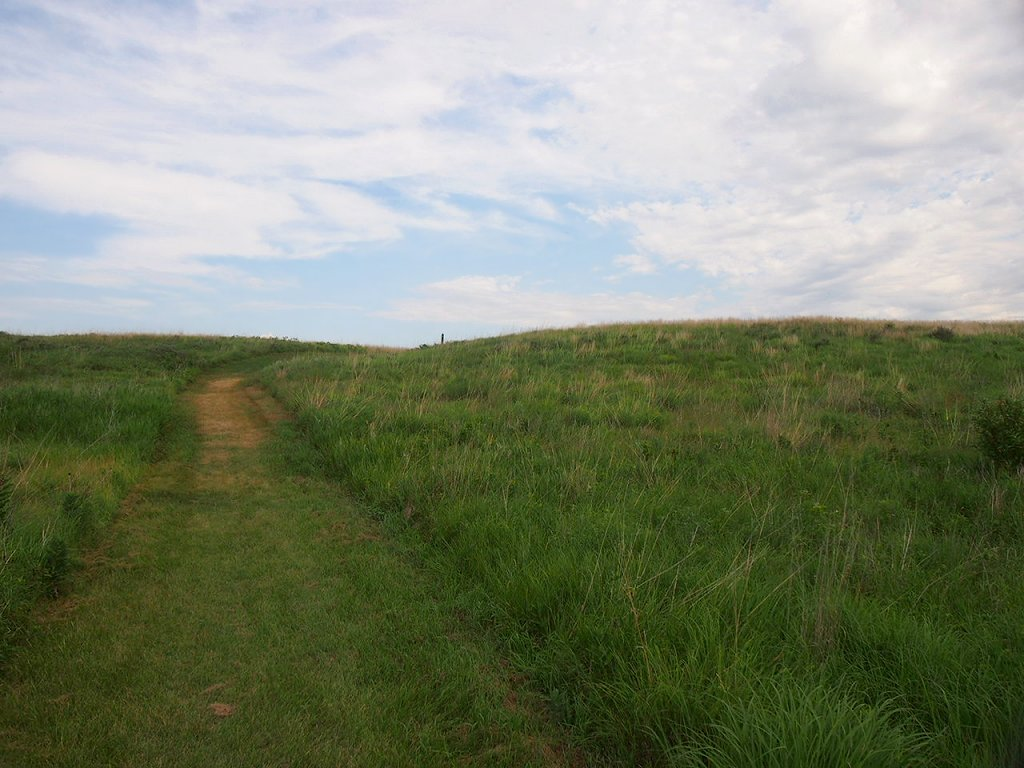
- Native prairie in Buffalo River State Park

- Location within Minnesota Location within the United States
- Location: Clay, Minnesota, United States
- Coordinates: 46°51′53″N 96°27′36″W
- Area: 1,068 acres (4.32 km^{2})
- Elevation: 981 ft (299 m)
- Established: 1937
- Named for: the Buffalo River
- Governing body: Minnesota Department of Natural Resources

- Buffalo River State Park WPA/Rustic Style Historic Resources
- U.S. National Register of Historic Places
- U.S. Historic district
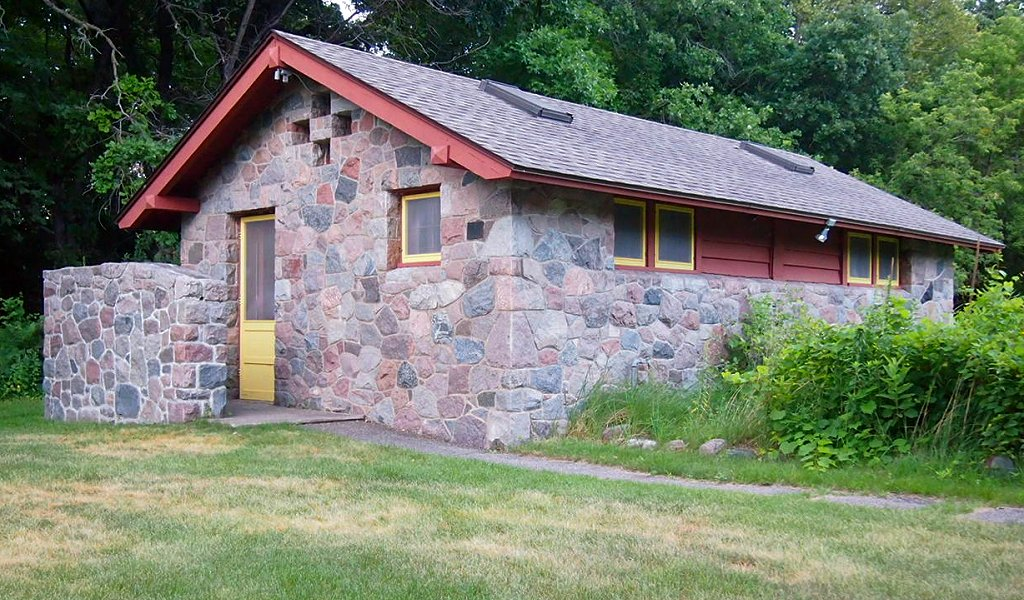
- One of the district's six contributing properties, a 1938 latrine
- Location: Off US 10, Riverton Township
- Area: 19 acres (7.7 ha)
- Built: 1937–1940
- Architect: O. Newstrom
- Architectural style: National Park Service rustic
- MPS: Minnesota State Park CCC/WPA/Rustic Style MPS
- NRHP reference No.: 89001671
- Added to NRHP: October 25, 1989

Buffalo River State Park is a state park of Minnesota, United States, conserving a prairie bisected by the wooded banks of the Buffalo River. Together with the adjacent Bluestem Prairie Scientific and Natural Area co-owned by The Nature Conservancy and Minnesota's Department of Natural Resources, it protects one of the largest and highest-quality prairie remnants in Minnesota. It used to offer a man-made swimming pond close to the Fargo–Moorhead metropolitan area, however, that has not been open since 2018. Presently, it is most popular for its high quality educational programming, swimming in the Buffalo River, and picnicking. The 1,068-acre (432 ha) park is located just off U.S. Route 10 in Clay County, 4.5 miles (7.2 km) east of Glyndon and 14 miles (23 km) east of Moorhead.

Buffalo River State Park was established in 1937 and developed by the Works Progress Administration. Three buildings and three structures built in the National Park Service rustic style were added to the National Register of Historic Places in 1989. The park was originally focused on providing outdoor recreation amenities like a man-made swimming pond since there were few other opportunities in the area. It was expanded beginning in the 1960s as the quality and rarity of the surrounding prairie were recognized.

The 6,078-acre (2,460 ha) Scientific and Natural Area (SNA) section is used for environmental education by local schools and regional colleges and universities. It is also a destination for viewing the spring courtship ritual of the greater prairie chicken.

== Natural history ==
=== Geology ===
The topography of Buffalo River/Bluestem Prairie largely formed beneath a proglacial lake at the end of the last glacial period. The region had previously been covered and exposed many times by successive glaciations. As the ice of the Wisconsin glaciation melted, the Red River Valley was covered by Glacial Lake Agassiz 10,000–8,000 years ago. Fine sediments formed a level lakebed. However beach ridges of sand and gravel formed in various places as the shorelines shifted. There is a beach ridge on the east edge of the state park called Campbell Ridge, and another to the southeast in the SNA called Norcross Ridge. The bedrock—a thin layer of shale over granite, slate, and schist—lies beneath 250–500 feet (76–152 m) of silt deposited by Lake Agassiz. The lake finally drained away to the north, leaving behind a distinctly flat plain with very rich soil.

Today the park slopes slightly westward, dropping 100 feet (30 m) in elevation from its eastern border to its western border. The fairly flat prairie is interrupted by the two sandy beach ridges and associated rolling hills. Where it crosses the ridges the Buffalo River has formed steep and unstable cut banks up to 30 feet (9.1 m) high. A few glacial erratics stud the prairie.

=== Flora ===
The Buffalo River and Bluestem prairies preserve one of the largest remnants of northern tall grasslands, an ecoregion largely confined to the Red River Valley. The prairie is of high quality, much of it never having been cultivated. It is characterized by big bluestem and little bluestem interspersed with forbs like coneflowers, blazing star, and prairie clover. Some 250 species of wildflowers and grasses have been cataloged in the park. Rare plants include sticky false-asphodel, small white lady's slipper, northern gentian, plains reedgrass, blanket flower, and the endangered western prairie fringed orchid. Yuccas and cacti can be found at the south end of the property.

A gallery forest extends across the prairie on either side of the Buffalo River. It is characterized by elm, ash, cottonwood, oak, and basswood. The understory comprises young basswood, ash, and elm along with boxelder, hazel, and gooseberry. The drier soil along the lip of the riverbank supports bur oak. Patches of willow, aspen, and boxelder occur on the prairie in spots with poor drainage.

=== Fauna ===
200 species of bird and 40 species of mammal have been documented in Buffalo River State Park. Mammals include moose, white-tailed deer, coyotes, red foxes, badgers, white-tailed jackrabbits, beavers, plains pocket mice, and northern grasshopper mice. Several uncommon prairie birds find refuge in the park, including greater prairie chickens, marbled godwits, and upland sandpipers. Also present are sandhill cranes, loggerhead shrikes, and Henslow's sparrows. Other vertebrates include the Great Plains toad and western hognose snake. Three rare butterflies have been documented in the prairie: the Regal Fritillary, Poweshiek skipper, and Dakota skipper.

== Cultural history ==
=== Native American history ===
American bison reliably wintered on the site of the future park, prompting Ojibwe people to call a stream Pijijiwizbi, meaning "Buffalo River." Although this originally referred only to a tributary of the modern Buffalo River, settlers misapplied the name to the larger waterway. Far back into prehistory, Native Americans commonly used the river and beach ridges as travel corridors. The Minnesota Historical Society has postulated that the park is likely to contain archaeological resources, but little research has been done.

=== Settlement ===
Euro-Americans arrived in the 1820s and recognized the fertile prairie soil as ideal farmland. A leg of the Red River Trails followed the ancient route along Campbell Ridge in the vicinity of the park. Bowing to mounting pressures against their traditional lifestyle, the local Ojibwe ceded the region to the United States in their 1855 Treaty of Washington.

In 1864 work began on the Northern Pacific Railway across the northern United States. Rail access brought homesteaders to the area in the 1870s. In 1875 J.H Smyser, who'd served as a captain in the Union Army during the American Civil War, purchased much of the future park property for a horse and cattle ranch. His impressive 1875 manor stood on the grounds for many years but burned down in 1959. Most of the land was used for pasture and hayfields rather than crop farming, which had the effect of preserving more of the native species.

To reduce a taxing gradient for their trains, Northern Pacific in 1906 began building the massive embankment that still marks the park's northern border.

=== Park creation and development ===
Buffalo River State Park

Buffalo River State Park was created in the late 1930s, taking advantage of federal job creation programs during the Great Depression. The Moorhead Rod and Gun Club championed the site and the Minnesota Legislature officially added it to the state park system in 1937. At the time it was the only state-owned recreational facility in the region. The Works Progress Administration (WPA) established a camp and began developing the park's original 122 acres (49 ha). WPA workmen established infrastructures like the swimming area, entrance road, parking area, water supply, and toilets. They also built a bathhouse, a latrine, and a diversion dam in the National Park Service rustic style using split stone and logs.

The original boundaries of the park were drawn with an emphasis on recreation. As recognition grew of the size and quality of the surrounding prairie, the park was expanded in the 1960s. The Nature Conservancy purchased additional land south of the park beginning in 1975. The Nature Conservancy's property lies partly within the state park's official boundaries and partly without.

In 1989 the park's WPA developments were listed on the National Register of Historic Places as a 19-acre (7.7 ha) historic district. The district comprises six contributing properties—three buildings and three structures. The buildings consist of a 1938 latrine, the 1940 bath house, and a 1940 garage/residence, only the former bath house is still available for public use. The structures consist of a 1938 diversion dam on the Buffalo River, the 1940 swimming beach (closed since 2018), and some 1940 stone curbs in the parking lot. The district boundary includes a well house constructed in the 1960s, which is non-contributing. The contributing properties are considered historically significant for their association with the Great Depression and the resulting federal work relief programs of the New Deal, and with the early development of Minnesota's state parks. They were also recognized for their finely crafted and labor-intensive split stone architecture.

== Recreation ==
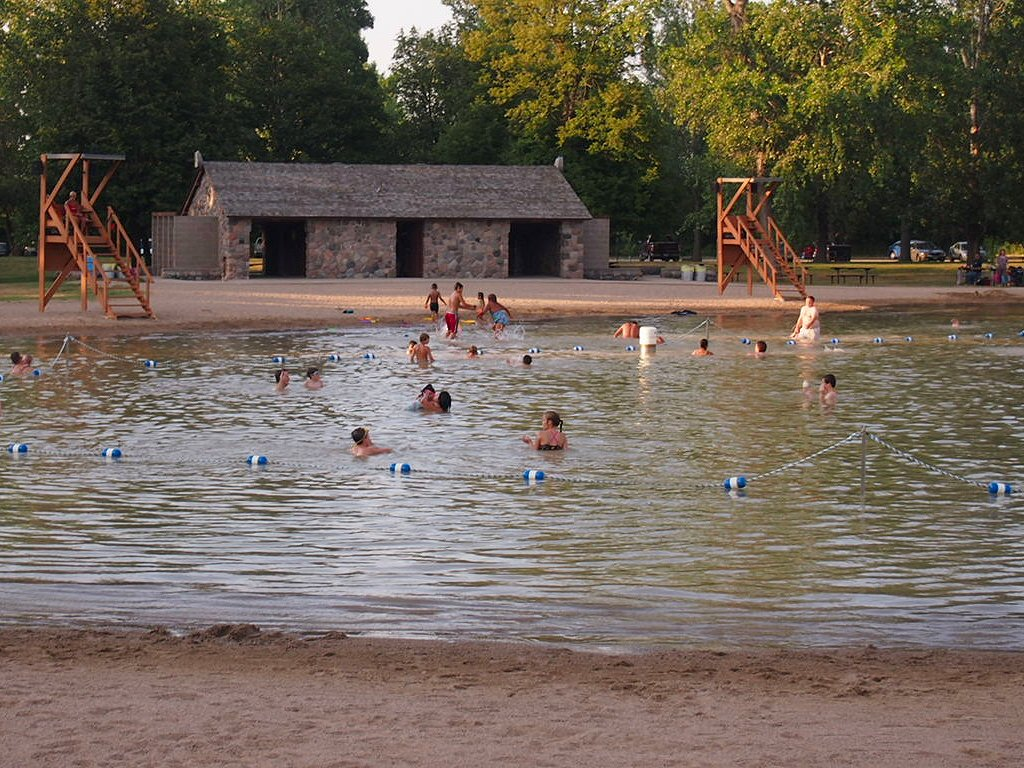
Buffalo River State Park's swimming pool and bath house

Buffalo River State Park sees high local use, particularly for its connection to the Pine to Prairie Birding route. Overnight visitors, conversely, are often far from home and using the park as a stopover on the way to a farther destination. Many campers come from Canada or the Dakotas. The campground has 44 sites—35 with electric hookups—plus showers, flush toilets, and a dump station. A separate group camp accommodates up to 50 people, but does not have flushing toilets (pit toilets only). The campground and picnic area are located in the shade of the forest.

The man-made swimming pond featured a sand bottom, filtered water, lifeguards, accessible features, and was surrounded by an artificial beach. Again, this feature has not been open since 2018 due to extensive repairs needed in the intake and filtration system and lack of lifeguards. It is not expected to reopen, and a committee is helping plan the repurposing of the site. The Buffalo River provides fishing opportunities.

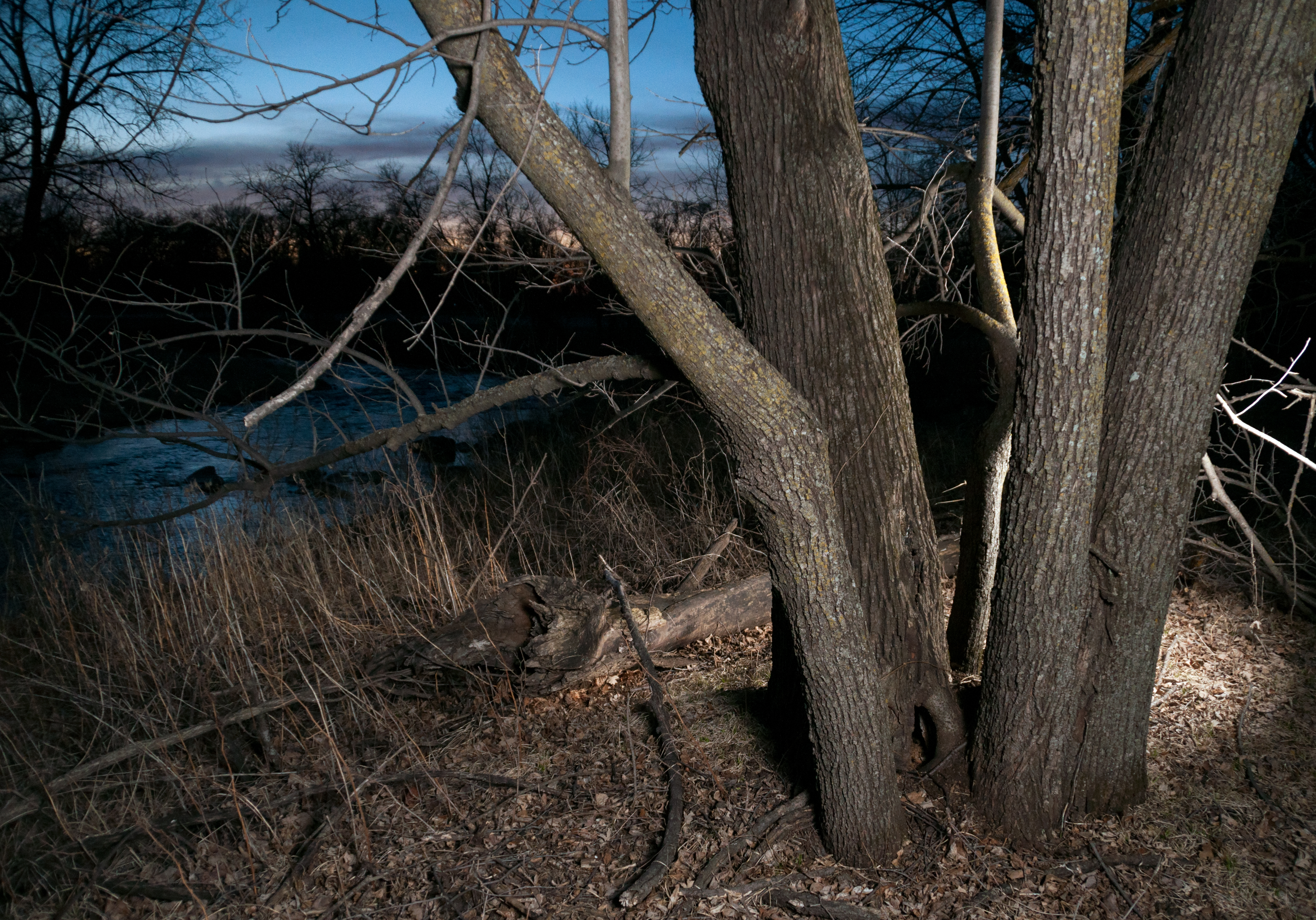
View of the Buffalo River from hiking trail.

There are 12 miles (19 km) of hiking trails, 6 miles (9.7 km) of which are groomed for cross-country skiing in winter. The rest of the park is open to snowshoers. In March and April The Nature Conservancy operates two viewing blinds from which visitors can observe the dramatic lek mating ritual of the greater prairie chicken.
