= Skunk River (Platte River tributary) =

- Mouth

Location
- Country: United States
- State: Minnesota
- County: Morrison County

Physical characteristics
- Source
  - location: Vineland
  - coordinates: 46.1263505°N 93.8616448°W
- Mouth
  - coordinates: 45°56′09″N 94°13′24″W
- Length: 36.2 mi-long (58.3 km)

Basin features
- Progression: Skunk River→ Platte River→ Mississippi River→ Gulf of Mexico
- River system: Mississippi River

The Skunk River is a 36.2-mile-long (58.3 km) tributary of the Platte River in central Minnesota, United States. The Platte River, in turn, is a tributary of the Mississippi River.

== See also ==
- List of rivers of Minnesota
- List of longest streams of Minnesota
