= Shingobee =

Shingobee may refer to:

- Shingobee Bay
- Shingobee Lake, a lake in Minnesota
- Shingobee River
- Shingobee Township, Cass County, Minnesota
