= John Rowell =

John Rowell may refer to:

- John W. Rowell (1835–1924), Vermont attorney, businessman and judge
- John Samuel Rowell (1825–1907), American agricultural inventor and pioneer manufacturer
