= Ted Rowell =

Ted Rowell may refer to:

- Theodore H. Rowell (1905–1979), Minnesota pharmaceutical industrialist and politician
- Ted Rowell (footballer) (c. 1877– c. 1967), Australian rules footballer in the Victorian Football League
