= Federal Dam, Minnesota =

City in Minnesota, United States

Federal Dam Gichi-gibaakwa'igan (Ojibwe)
- City
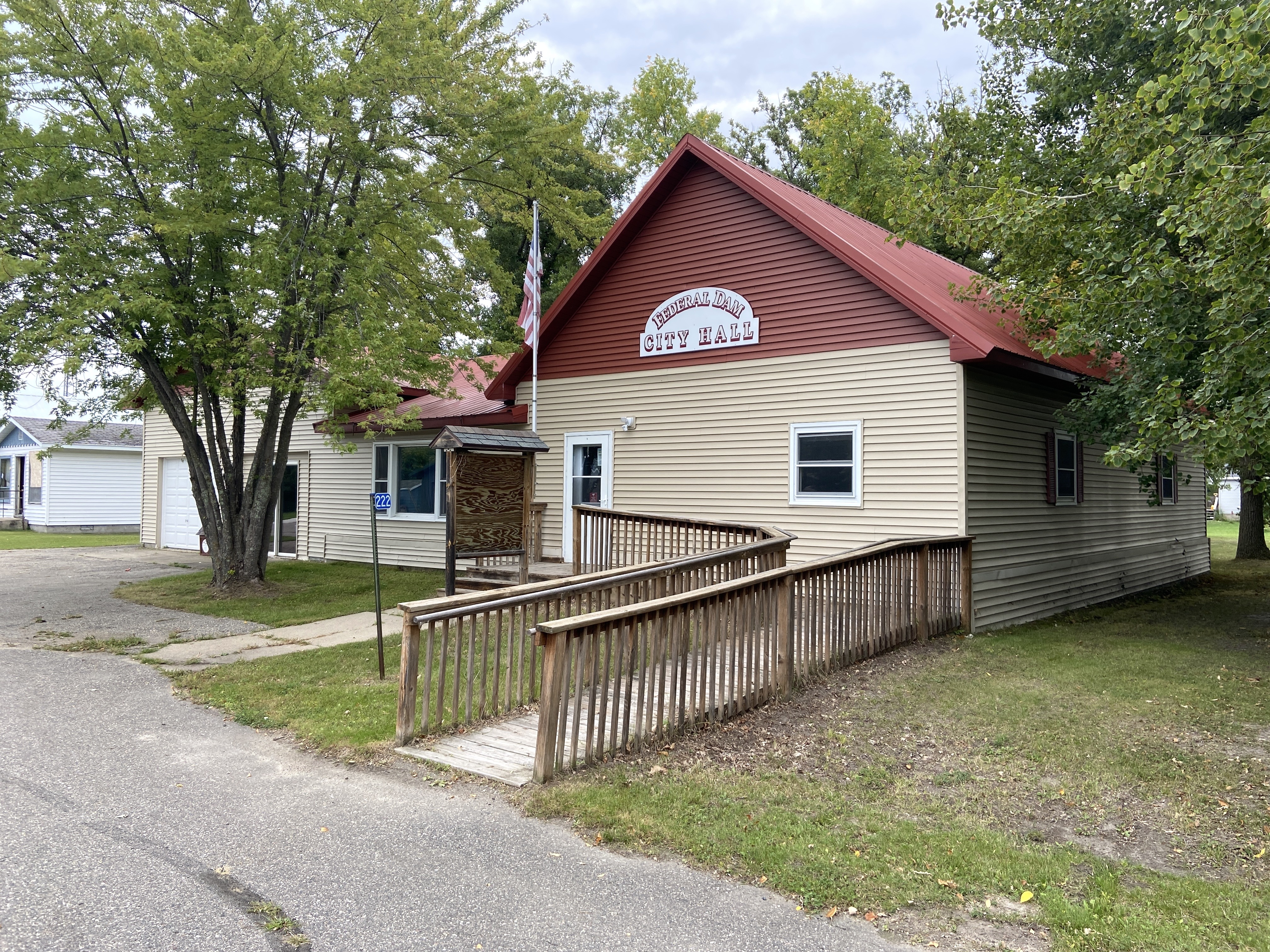
- City Hall
- Motto: The Best Little City By A Dam Site"
- Location of Federal Dam within Cass County, Minnesota
- Coordinates: 47°14′40″N 94°14′15″W
- Country: United States
- State: Minnesota
- County: Cass

Area
  - Total: 2.23 sq mi (5.77 km^{2})
  - Land: 2.21 sq mi (5.72 km^{2})
  - Water: 0.019 sq mi (0.05 km^{2})
- Elevation: 1,309 ft (399 m)

Population (2020)
  - Total: 123
  - Density: 55.7/sq mi (21.49/km^{2})
- Time zone: UTC-6 (Central (CST))
  - Summer (DST): UTC-5 (CDT)
- ZIP code: 56641
- Area code: 218
- FIPS code: 27-20798
- GNIS feature ID: 2394754
- Website: http://federaldam.com/wordpress/

Federal Dam (Ojibwe: Gichi-gibaakwa'igan) is a city in Cass County, Minnesota, United States, near Leech Lake. The population was 123 at the 2020 census. It is part of the Brainerd Micropolitan Statistical Area.

== History ==
A post office called Federal Dam was established in 1910. The city took its name from a nearby dam constructed by the federal government of the United States.

== Geography ==
According to the United States Census Bureau, the city has a total area of 2.27 square miles (5.88 km^{2}), of which 2.25 square miles (5.83 km^{2}) is land and 0.02 square miles (0.05 km^{2}) is water. County Road 8 serves as a main route in the community. County Roads 4 and 63 are both nearby. The Leech Lake River flows nearby.

=== Climate ===
Climate data for Leech Lake, Minnesota (1991–2020 normals, extremes 1897–present)
Month	Jan	Feb	Mar	Apr	May	Jun	Jul	Aug	Sep	Oct	Nov	Dec	Year
Record high °F (°C)	53 (12)	61 (16)	81 (27)	94 (34)	102 (39)	98 (37)	104 (40)	100 (38)	101 (38)	90 (32)	72 (22)	58 (14)	104 (40)
Mean daily maximum °F (°C)	17.6 (−8.0)	23.8 (−4.6)	37.4 (3.0)	51.8 (11.0)	66.1 (18.9)	75.4 (24.1)	79.8 (26.6)	78.2 (25.7)	69.3 (20.7)	54.1 (12.3)	36.4 (2.4)	23.1 (−4.9)	51.1 (10.6)
Daily mean °F (°C)	7.7 (−13.5)	12.5 (−10.8)	26.2 (−3.2)	40.6 (4.8)	54.4 (12.4)	64.4 (18.0)	69.1 (20.6)	67.1 (19.5)	58.2 (14.6)	44.5 (6.9)	28.9 (−1.7)	15.0 (−9.4)	40.7 (4.8)
Mean daily minimum °F (°C)	−2.3 (−19.1)	1.2 (−17.1)	15.1 (−9.4)	29.4 (−1.4)	42.7 (5.9)	53.5 (11.9)	58.3 (14.6)	55.9 (13.3)	47.1 (8.4)	35.0 (1.7)	21.3 (−5.9)	6.8 (−14.0)	30.3 (−0.9)
Record low °F (°C)	−52 (−47)	−59 (−51)	−48 (−44)	−13 (−25)	12 (−11)	24 (−4)	35 (2)	27 (−3)	16 (−9)	1 (−17)	−37 (−38)	−51 (−46)	−59 (−51)
Average precipitation inches (mm)	0.68 (17)	0.68 (17)	1.11 (28)	1.86 (47)	2.91 (74)	3.82 (97)	4.37 (111)	3.20 (81)	3.13 (80)	2.51 (64)	1.22 (31)	1.09 (28)	26.58 (675)
Average snowfall inches (cm)	9.3 (24)	7.2 (18)	6.8 (17)	5.9 (15)	0.0 (0.0)	0.0 (0.0)	0.0 (0.0)	0.0 (0.0)	0.0 (0.0)	1.1 (2.8)	6.8 (17)	11.1 (28)	48.2 (122)
Average precipitation days (≥ 0.01 in)	6.0	5.1	6.0	6.6	11.7	12.8	12.0	9.9	10.5	9.6	6.5	6.3	103.0
Average snowy days (≥ 0.1 in)	6.1	4.7	3.7	2.0	0.0	0.0	0.0	0.0	0.0	0.9	3.7	6.4	27.5
Source: NOAA

== Demographics ==
Historical population
Census	Pop.	Note	%±
1920	332		—
1930	278		−16.3%
1940	269		−3.2%
1950	225		−16.4%
1960	185		−17.8%
1970	147		−20.5%
1980	192		30.6%
1990	118		−38.5%
2000	101		−14.4%
2010	110		8.9%
2020	123		11.8%
U.S. Decennial Census

=== 2010 census ===
As of the census of 2010, there were 110 people, 49 households, and 26 families living in the city. The population density was 48.9 inhabitants per square mile (18.9/km^{2}). There were 137 housing units at an average density of 60.9 per square mile (23.5/km^{2}). The racial makeup of the city was 56.4% White, 23.6% Native American, and 20.0% from two or more races.

There were 49 households, of which 28.6% had children under the age of 18 living with them, 36.7% were married couples living together, 6.1% had a female householder with no husband present, 10.2% had a male householder with no wife present, and 46.9% were non-families. 32.7% of all households were made up of individuals, and 12.3% had someone living alone who was 65 years of age or older. The average household size was 2.24 and the average family size was 2.92.

The median age in the city was 48 years. 23.6% of residents were under the age of 18; 8.2% were between the ages of 18 and 24; 13.6% were from 25 to 44; 38.2% were from 45 to 64; and 16.4% were 65 years of age or older. The gender makeup of the city was 50.0% male and 50.0% female.

=== 2000 census ===
As of the census of 2000, there were 101 people, 43 households, and 23 families living in the city. The population density was 53.3 inhabitants per square mile (20.6/km^{2}). There were 81 housing units at an average density of 42.7 per square mile (16.5/km^{2}). The racial makeup of the city was 71.29% White, 18.81% Native American, 0.99% Asian, and 8.91% from two or more races.

There were 43 households, out of which 23.3% had children under the age of 18 living with them, 39.5% were married couples living together, 11.6% had a female householder with no husband present, and 44.2% were non-families. 41.9% of all households were made up of individuals, and 14.0% had someone living alone who was 65 years of age or older. The average household size was 2.35 and the average family size was 3.29.

In the city, the population was spread out, with 35.6% under the age of 18, 5.0% from 18 to 24, 18.8% from 25 to 44, 20.8% from 45 to 64, and 19.8% who were 65 years of age or older. The median age was 40 years. For every 100 females, there were 98.0 males. For every 100 females age 18 and over, there were 97.0 males.

The median income for a household in the city was $22,917, and the median income for a family was $27,188. Males had a median income of $11,250 versus $21,250 for females. The per capita income for the city was $12,414. There were 18.5% of families and 28.0% of the population living below the poverty line, including 45.7% of under eighteens and 17.2% of those over 64.
