= Eelpout Festival =

Annual event in Walker, Minnesota, US

- Official Logo of the Eelpout Festival
- Genre: Festival
- Dates: February 2022
- Location: Walker, Minnesota
- Years active: 1979–2019, 2022–
- Attendance: 11,000 (2012)
- Website: http://www.eelpoutfestival.com/

The International Eelpout Festival is an annual gathering held in the town of Walker, Minnesota. It celebrates the eelpout (or burbot, scientific name Lota lota), an indigenous bottom dwelling fish that inhabits the region's lakes, in some cases being found as deep as 300m. The fish itself is described as a cross between a catfish and eel, giving it a slender disposition but retaining a tapered midsection with a full complement of pectoral and caudal fins. While Lota lota is known locally as eelpout, eelpout also may refer to a family of marine fishes. Leech Lake is known for its exceptional walleye fishing, making this festival a banner for the often forgotten eelpout.

== History ==
The first Eelpout Festival was held in January 1980, and it ran annually until 2019. From 1983 onwards, the festival was held in February. Because of pollution, cost and safety concerns, 2020 saw the festival get scrapped. The celebration is held during one of the coldest periods of the year, and temperatures often reach well below zero. In 2016 and 2017, however, the ice was too thin to permit motor vehicles onto the lake.

== Environment ==
Leech Lake is well known among locals for its abundance of walleye, bass, Northern pike, sunfish and muskellunge. Eelpout are frequently caught only during the winter months. Leech Lake is the third largest lake in Minnesota covering 102,947.83 acres, with 195 miles of shoreline, and a maximum depth of 150 feet. Temperatures in February average a high of 19 degrees Fahrenheit and a low of 3 degrees F.

== 2018 attempted location move ==
As reported in September 2017, for a variety of reasons the festival board had explored the possibility of relocating the event to Lake Bemidji, an hour northwest of Walker. According to the Bemidji Pioneer, an application was filed with the Beltrami County board to proceed with moving the event north. Beltrami County officials voiced concern about the potential impact of the event on Lake Bemidji, and the 2018 festival ultimately did not move from Leech Lake.
