= Rowell Laboratories =

American pharmaceutical company

- Type: Pharmaceuticals
- Founded: 1929
- Headquarters: Orlando, Florida

Rowell Laboratories, Inc., is a pharmaceutical manufacturing company. The company was founded in 1929, originally located in Baudette, Minnesota, and later included facilities in Marietta, Georgia, and Orlando, Florida. Rowell Laboratories, Inc. was incorporated again in 2008 in Florida and manufactures and sells the NatureCare brand of skin care products.

== Commercial fishing and blue foxes ==
Joseph C.N. Rowell feeding foxes at the Northern Blue Fox Farm

In 1920, Joseph C.N. Rowell had settled with his family on the shores of Lake of the Woods in northern Minnesota to fish commercially. Joseph C.N. Rowell was the grandson of John Samuel Rowell (1825–1907), a noted Wisconsin farm implement inventor and industrialist. He had recently returned from France as a 1st lieutenant in the US Army, being in charge of an aircraft maintenance facility during World War I. Joe had become knowledgeable about commercial fishing, canning, and wholesale distribution business from his experience in a previous venture, the Chetlo Harbor Packing Company, a commercial salmon fishing and canning operation Joe founded in 1912 located at Chetlo Harbor, Washington.

Joe founded the Rowell Fishery on Lake of the Woods, and although the enterprise was a successful commercial fishing business, the nets were consistently filled with a rough fish called a burbot, the only fresh water relative of the salt water Cod fish. The burbot had no commercial value, and was an aggressive predator of young walleyes and northern pike.

Net fishing on Lake of the Woods

Joseph C.N. Rowell in front of nets drying at the Rowell Fishery

Joseph C.N. Rowell feeding foxes at the Northern Blue Fox Farm

Joe Rowell also founded another venture with a Doctor Osborne from International Falls, Minnesota, the Northern Blue Fox Farm, which commercially raised blue foxes for the fur industry, a very lucrative business at the time. Joe had been in the practice of feeding the foxes with the burbot that filled his nets, resulting in very healthy foxes. At annual fur buying time, the fur buyers who came around each year during fur buying season would comment on the superiority of the Rowell foxs' coats, stating that these were the finest pelts they had seen. On May 24, 1930, the Baudette Region reported that about 100 fox pups had been born in the past week with another 50 to 60 more expected. Several mother cats were rounded up to help nurse many of the pups whose mothers had no milk. One mother fox had given birth to 16 babies — thought to be a record. At this time, market price for blue fox furs was $290 per pelt.

== Theodore H. Rowell Sr. and Burbot Liver Oil ==
Ted Rowell Sr. with a 15 lb. burbot, which will yield a 1 lb. liver

This led Joe and son Theodore H. Rowell to believe that the burbot was the reason for the rich pelts, and suspected that oil from the burbot contained something of great value to modern medicine. Ted had just finished pharmacy school at the University of Minnesota and opened a drug store in nearby Baudette. On Christmas Eve, 1929, a devastating fire destroyed the drug store. Immediate rebuilding was impossible, but the burbot transformed a disaster into an opportunity. After the fire, Ted Rowell devoted full-time for a year to researching the ugly eel-like fish. His studies ultimately demonstrated that burbot liver oil was exceptionally high in vitamin A and D – 6 to 8 times more potent than Cod liver oil, which was in very wide use at the time. Ted's assays on the vitamin content were done for him by the Parke-Davis and Eli Lilly companies. Furthermore, Ted developed a method to extract pure oil from the burbot's liver, worked on dosage forms and dosage amounts, packaging, labeling, and finally marketing and distribution channels. Most of the marketing was done through correspondence and sending out samples. A very large early order was from the Pepsodent Company for 36 million bottles of Burbot Liver Oil, an order impossible for Ted to fill at that time.

== The Burbot Liver Products Company ==
In 1935, Joe and son Ted incorporated the company as the Burbot Liver Products Company, with Joe as president and Ted as secretary, with a capitalization of $10,000. By 1937, Rowell Burbot Liver Oil was accepted by the AMA, the American Medical Association. Initially, burbot liver oil was available only in 8 oz. bottles, but due to its potency, it eventually became available in a dropper bottle. This was significant because with Cod liver oil, you needed to take it by the spoonful, but because of Burbot Liver Oil's high A&D potency, you only needed a few drops. Burbot Liver Products Company began developing salves, and offered the oil in soft gel capsules filled under contract by the R.P. Scherer Company in Sarasota, Florida.

Product volume continued to increase so by 1940–41, Burbot Liver Products Company purchased 500,000 lb (230,000 kg) of burbot livers annually. Rowell was buying burbot livers from all 30 commercial fisherman on Lake of the Woods, and from other fisherman throughout northern Minnesota. With the start of World War II, the supply of Cod liver oil in the U.S. had been reduced when Germany invaded Norway, and this resulted in a strong boost in Burbot Liver Oil sales.

Throughout the 1940s, starting with a calcium supplement Vio-Cal, the company began manufacturing and selling its own line of multi-vitamins and multi-minerals, and further expanding its sales and distribution network throughout the mid-west, eventually manufacturing as many as 200 different products, including prescription drugs.

Rowell Laboratories as it appeared in the late 1940s

Ted Rowell Sr. at his desk about 1950

== Rowell Laboratories, Inc. and Theodore H. Rowell Jr. ==
In 1949, the name of the company was changed to Rowell Laboratories, Inc. to better represent the company after focus was moved away from Burbot liver-based products. In the 1960s, the company began to specialize in gastro-enterology products. The company grew to sales of about $1.2 million in 1962, the year Theodore H. Rowell Jr. became president. When Ted Rowell Sr. retired from Rowell Laboratories in 1965, the business had revenues of approximately $1.5 million. He had spent most of his life building the company, so with the early days of struggling behind them, and the company's future promising, Ted Sr. decided to retire.

Ted Rowell Jr. at his desk in the mid-1980s

With Ted Rowell Jr., a new style of management was introduced to Rowell Laboratories, Inc. His father, and company founder, Ted Sr. managed through a "classic entrepreneurial" style of management, where Ted Sr. was involved in every decision of any significance. Because of the company's growth over the years, the company had eventually outgrown this style of management, and Ted Jr. brought in a classic "management through delegation of authority" style of management. This allowed Ted to concentrate on company direction, growth, and profitability, while the management team of vice-presidents ran their respective departments while contributing to the direction and growth of the company. Ted credits the success of the company to the outstanding team of officers in his management team during the growth years: Thomas Dinndorf, Cyril "Pep" Pepera, Dr. Ben Greenwell, PhD, George Cherekos, Robert Solheim, Jesse Cohn, and Dr. Dave Powell, PhD. Members of the board of directors during these years were Ted Jr., William H. Ramsey, Lawrence "Larry" Weaver, Raymond C. Schwiegert, and Daniel J. Haggerty. Over the years, company sales typically doubled every 5–6 years.

By the mid-1980s, under Ted's guidance, the company had grown to be a national manufacturer of prescription drugs specializing in digestive diseases, and by 1984 had revenues of $15 million, with net profit before taxes of approx. 10%.

Reid-Rowell, Inc. in the mid-1980s. Marietta, Georgia location. Manufacturing and R&D were done at Baudette, and Administration in Marietta.

== Rowell merger with Reid-Provident Laboratories, Inc. ==
In 1985, Ted and Ferrell S. Ryan of Reid Provident Labs in Atlanta, Georgia decided to merge their two similar sized and complementary companies, calling the new company Reid-Rowell, Inc. Ted Rowell Jr. was made chairman of the board, and Ferrell was made CEO. The combined company employed 380 people, which included a 140-man sales force. Due to management's dedication to the employees, no jobs were lost through the merger process. Reid-Provident was a publicly traded company, but traded on the pink sheets. Now due to the new company's revenues and assets, its stock now qualified it to be traded on the NASDAQ exchange. Since this was late in the 1985 fiscal year, only a portion of the Rowell revenues, from the date of the merger onto the end of the fiscal year, would contribute to the revenues of the overall company for the fiscal year, but the combined annual revenue for the two companies for fiscal 1985 was $32 million. The first quarter of fiscal year 1986 resulted in revenue for Reid-Rowell, Inc. of $10 million for the quarter, and revenue estimates for fiscal 1986 were upwards of $50 million.

== Sale to Solvay & Cie ==
In 1986, Solvay & Cie of Belgium tendered an offer to purchase the stock of Reid-Rowell, Inc., which was accepted by its board of directors. The company was then purchased by Solvay, became a wholly owned subsidiary, and is today known as Solvay Pharmaceuticals, Inc. Ted Rowell served on the board of directors of Reid-Rowell, the Solvay subsidiary, until 1991. Today, the company reports revenues in excess of $1 billion. More recently, Ted Jr. has been an advisor to the University of Florida School of Pharmacy, and sits on the board of directors of Astralis Group. He continues his involvement in pharmaceutical and entrepreneurial activities as an advisor to Rowell Capital Partners, an investment banking group specializing in opportunities in the pharmaceutical industry and acquisitions in pharmaceutical manufacturing.

Rowell Laboratories, Inc., a Florida corporation, was incorporated in 2008 in Orlando, Florida as a separate and new company, and manufactures and sells natural antifungal and natural antibiotic skin care products under the NatureCare brand. Although founded by members of the Rowell family, it is not part of the original Rowell Laboratories, Inc. or Solvay Pharmaceuticals, Inc. of Marietta, Georgia or Brussels, Belgium.

On or around Sept. 28, 2009, the global chemical giant Solvay SA of Brussels, Belgium announced that it has agreed to sell its global pharmaceutical division Solvay Pharmaceuticals Global to Abbott Laboratories, Inc. of Abbott Park, IL for approximately $6.6 billion cash. Solvay Pharmaceuticals Global reports annual revenues of approximately $3.9 billion, of which approximately $1.2 billion is generated by Solvay Pharmaceuticals US, and employs 9,600 people. This acquisition by Abbott will return the US division of Solvay Pharmaceuticals, plus the European division, to American management and an American board of directors.

== Theodore H. Rowell Graduate Fellowship at the University of Minnesota School of Pharmacy ==
After Ted Sr's death, the Rowell family set up the Theodore H. Rowell Graduate Fellowship at the University of Minnesota for graduate students in the College of Pharmacy. Grants range from $3,000 to $6,000 with preference to Minnesota residents who are US citizens.

== Rowell Laboratories, Inc. today ==
Rowell Laboratories, Inc. was re-incorporated in 2008 as a Florida corporation and manufactures natural and homeopathic health care products under the NatureCare brand.

== Rowell firsts ==
- 1932 Burbot Liver Oil
- 1937 Rowell Burbot Liver Oil accepted by American Medical Association
- 1938 First injectable vitamin A
- 1944 First dry fill multiple vitamin capsule
- 1947 Vio-Bec the first ultrahigh-potency therapeutic B complex
- 1949 First PAS in dosage forms
- 1950 Vio-Dex, first anti-obesity product with multi-vitamin/amphetamine
- 1957 C-Ron, first ferrous fumarate and vitamin C product
- 1958 Residerm, first ion exchange resin for treatment of Rhus dermatosis (poison ivy)
- 1961 Vio-Dexose, unique anti-obesity therapy
- 1966 First to develop a hydrocortisone retention enema for Ulcerative Colitis
- 1967 First to file an NDA for Lithium Carbonate, for manic patients. The FDA held up the Rowell NDA to allow 2 large competitors to catch up, thus taking a large piece of Rowell's market share and giving it to the other 2 companies.
- 1967 First FDA approval 2x per day Lithium dosage
- 1973 NDA 83-009 for ORASONE Tablets, 1 mg., 5 mg., 10 mg., and 20 mg.
- 1976 Rowell products onboard NASA's Skylab
- 1979-1983 numerous patents for controlled release of solid dose tablets to ensure consistent rate of drug release as tablet reduces in size
- 1980 Advancement in bulk laxative sugar free psyllium compositions for ease of mixing
- 1981 Chenix, first US approved drug for dissolution of gallstones
- 1988 Rowasa, first 5-ASA enema treatment for Ulcerative colitis

== Patents held ==
- US Patent 4539198 – Solid pharmaceutical formulations for slow, zero order release via controlled surface erosion: expanded range
- US Patent 4264573 – Pharmaceutical formulation for slow release via controlled surface erosion
- US Patent 4361545 – Solid pharmaceutical formulations for slow, zero order release via controlled surface erosion
- US Patent 4321263 – Psyllium powder is rendered substantially instantly and uniformly dispersible
- US Patent 4657900 – Pharmaceutical article of manufacture comprising a bisulfite stabilized aqueous solution of 5-aminosalicylic acid and method
