= Rowell v. Lindsay =

- Supreme Court of the United States

Argued December 15–16, 1884 Decided January 25, 1885
- Full case name: Rowell v. Lindsay
- Citations: 113 U.S. 97 (more) 5 S. Ct. 507; 28 L. Ed. 906

Court membership
- Chief Justice Morrison Waite Associate Justices Samuel F. Miller · Stephen J. Field; Joseph P. Bradley · John M. Harlan; William B. Woods · Stanley Matthews; Horace Gray · Samuel Blatchford

Case opinion
- Majority: Woods, joined by unanimous

Rowell v. Lindsay, 113 U.S. 97 (1885), was a bill brought by the appellants, John S. Rowell and Ira Rowell, the plaintiffs in the circuit court. The bill was in equity against Edmund J. Lindsay and William Lindsay, the appellees, to restrain the infringement of reissued letters patent No. 2,909, dated March 31, 1868, granted to the plaintiffs for 'a new and improved cultivator.

The answer of the defendants, among other defenses, denied infringement of the letters patent. The plaintiffs contended that infringement of their letters patent was made out by the evidence, which tended to show that the defendants constructed and sold seeding-machines made according to the specification of letters patent granted to John H. Thomas and Joseph W. Thomas, dated June 30, 1874, for 'an improvement in seeding-machines.' This invention related to the drag-bars and shovel standards of broad cast seeders, and consisted mainly in the manner of attaching the standards to the drag-bar.

Upon final hearing upon the pleadings and proofs the circuit court dismissed the bill, and the plaintiffs appealed.

The evidence showed that the shanks or standards of plows, cultivators, and seeding machines have been used in a great variety of forms. In some, the upper end of the brace entered the beam in the rear, and in others, in front of the shank. In some, the upper end of the shank and the brace were so formed and united as to present an elliptical figure. Many, perhaps the majority, were without braces. In some, the upper end of the shank was made with a head in the form of an elliptical or circular plate, called an enlarged head. This performed the function of a brace.

The patent of the plaintiffs stood on narrow ground, and to sustain it, it must be construed as to confine it substantially to the form described in the specification. The patent of the plaintiffs was for a combination only. None of the separate elements which the combination was composed are claimed as the invention of the patentee; therefore none of them, standing alone, are included in the monopoly of the patent. As was said by Mr. Justice BRADLEY in the case of The Corn-Planter Patent, 23 Wall. 224: 'When a patentee, after describing a machine, claims as his invention a certain combination of elements, or a certain device, or part of the machine, this is an implied declaration-as conclusive, so far as that patent is concerned, as if it were expressed-that the specific combination or thing claimed is the only part which the patentee regards as new. True, he or some other person may have a distinct patent for portions not covered by this, but that will speak for itself. So far as the patent in question is concerned, the remaining parts are old, or common and public.' See, also, Merrill v. Yeomans, 94 U.S. 573; Water-meter Co. v. Desper, 101 U.S. 332-337; Miller v. Brass Co. 104 U.S. 350. These authorities dispose of the contention of the plaintiffs' counsel that their patent covers one of the separate elements which enters into the combination, namely, a slotted wooden beam, because, as they contend, that element is new, and is the original invention of the patentees.

The patent was for a combination so there could be no infringement unless the combination is infringed. It was plain, upon an inspection of the drawings, that the defendants do not use a brace-bar similar in shape or position to that described in the plaintiffs' patent. The specification and drawings of the plaintiffs' patent, and the testimony of the plaintiffs' witnesses, show that one purpose of the brace-bar, used in the plaintiffs' combination, was to strengthen and support the shank between the tooth and the beam. The use of the brace-bar enabled the plaintiffs to make the shank with less material, and, at the same time, to increase its strength. The court found that the curved upper part of the shank used by defendants does not perform one of the material functions of the brace-bar of the plaintiffs' combination. It cannot, therefore, be the equivalent of the latter. For where one patented combinais asserted to be an infringement of another, a device in one, to be the equivalent of a device in the other, must perform the same functions.

therefore, there was one element of the plaintiffs' patented combination which the defendants do not use, and for which they do not employ an equivalent, it follows that they do not infringe the plaintiffs' patent. The decree of the circuit court, which dismissed the plaintiffs' bill, was therefore affirmed; and it was so ordered.

== See also ==
- List of United States Supreme Court cases, volume 113
- John S. Rowell Wikipedia Article
