= Leech Lake =

Lake in the state of Minnesota, United States

- Gaa-zagaskwaajimekaag (Ojibwe)
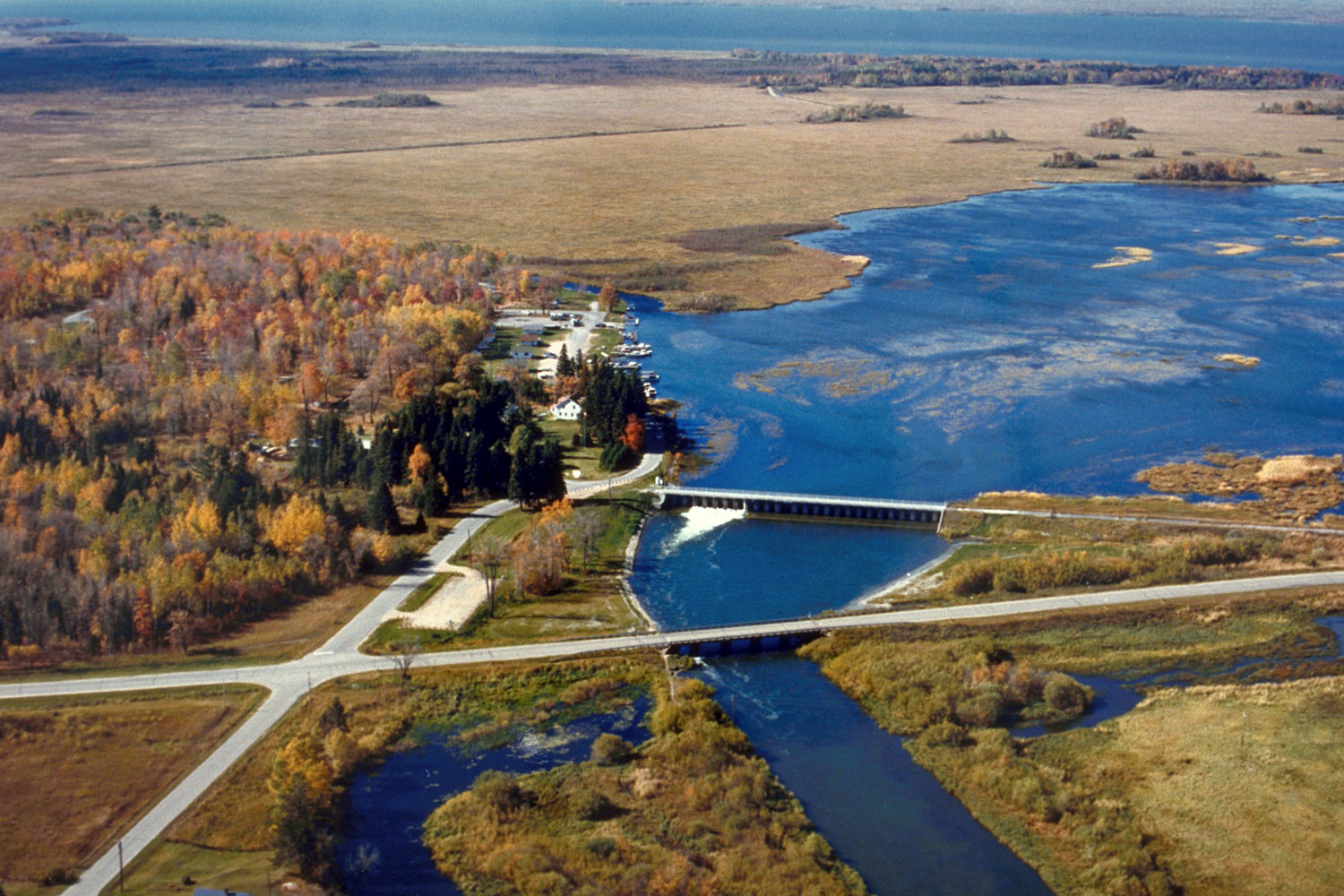
- Lake and Dam

- Location within Minnesota
- Location: Chippewa National Forest, Cass County, Minnesota, U.S.
- Coordinates: 47°09′21″N 94°23′24″W
- Type: reservoir from natural lake
- Primary outflows: Leech Lake River
- Basin countries: United States
- Surface area: 102,947 acres (416.61 km^{2})
- Max. depth: 156 ft (48 m)
- Shore length^{1}: 160.9 mi (258.9 km)
- Surface elevation: 1,296 ft (395 m)
- Settlements: (see article)
- ^{1} Shore length is not a well-defined measure.

Leech Lake (translated from the Ojibwe language Gaa-zagaskwaajimekaag: Lake abundant with bloodsuckers) is a lake located in north central Minnesota, United States. It is southeast of Bemidji, located mainly within the Leech Lake Indian Reservation, and completely within the Chippewa National Forest. It is used as a reservoir. The lake is the third largest in Minnesota, covering 102,947.83 acres (416.6151 km^{2}) with 195 miles (314 km) of shoreline and has a maximum depth of 156 feet (48 m).

== Hydrology ==
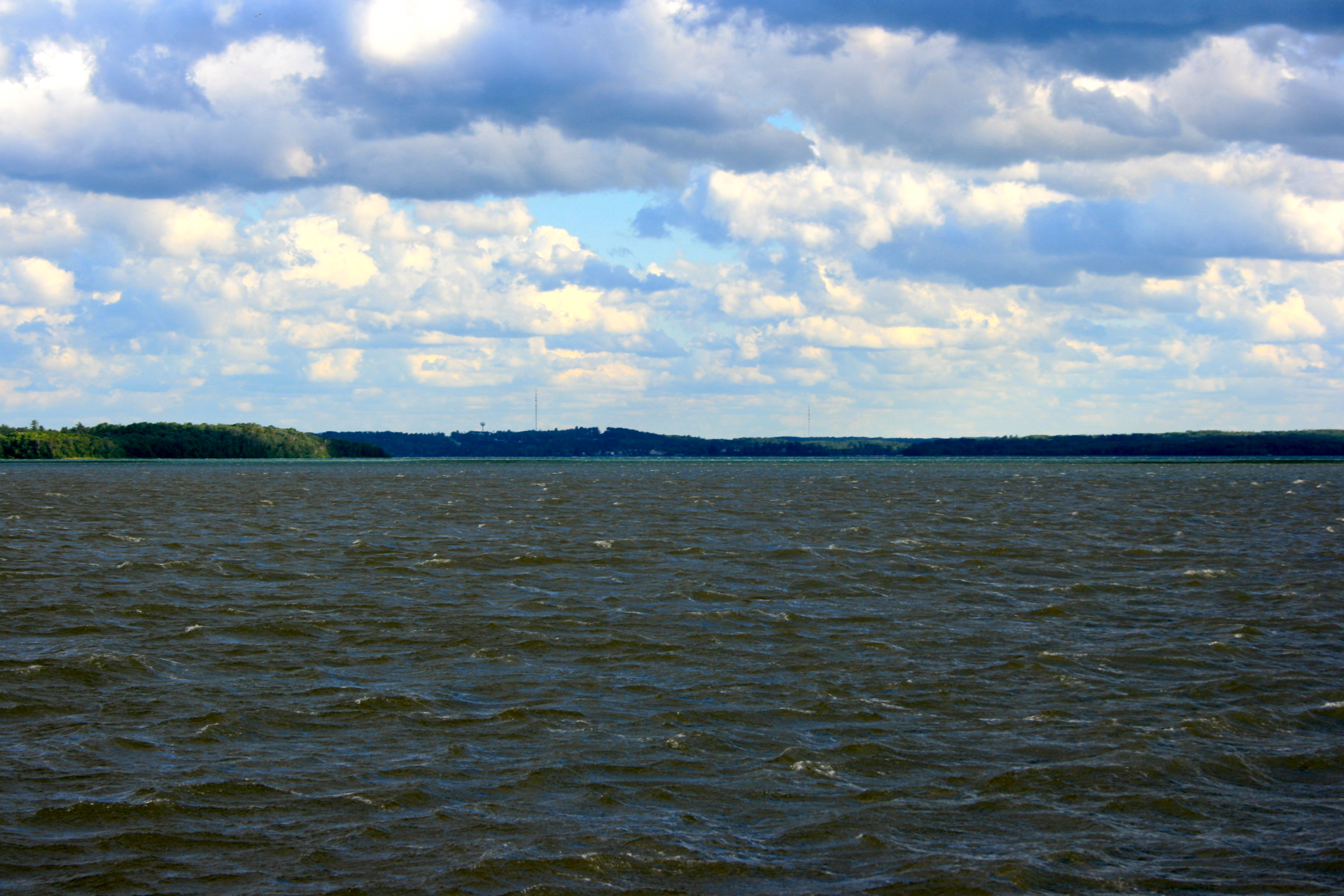
Walker Bay and The Narrows, looking south from Oak Point

Leech Lake outlets to the Leech Lake River, which flows into the Mississippi River. The sole outlet to the Leech Lake River is controlled by a dam in order to regulate water levels of the lake. Leech Lake has seven major inlets that include Portage Lake Creek, Sucker Creek, Steamboat River, Benedict River, Shingobee River, Bishop Creek, and the Boy River. There are also nine minor inlets that flow into Leech Lake.

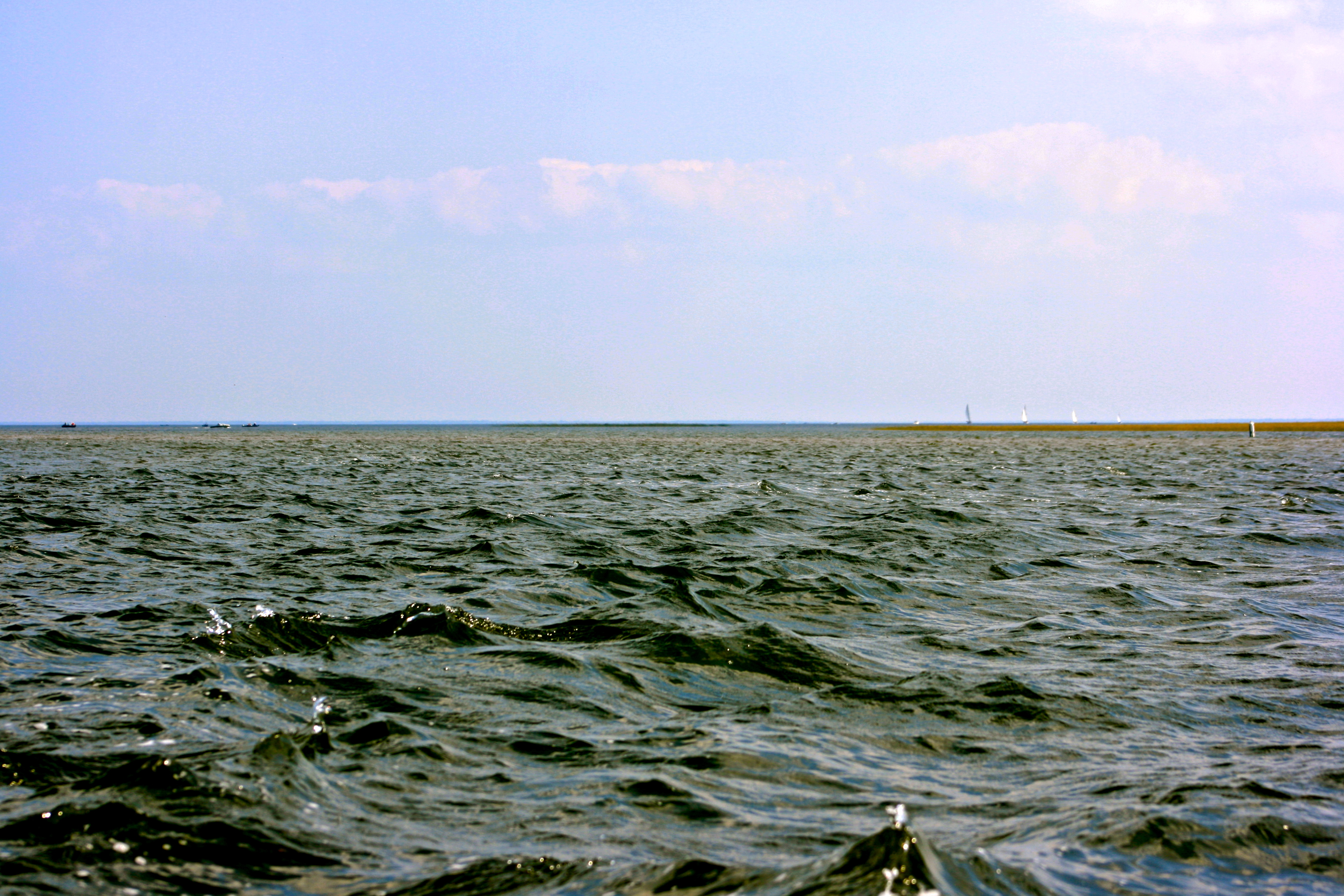
The larger east portion of Leech Lake, as seen from The Narrows

=== Islands ===
Leech Lake hosts eleven islands that cover a total of 1,617 acres of land.

The following list is in order from largest to smallest.

- Bear Island
- Minnesota Island
- Pelican Island
- Headquarters Bay Island
- Big Pipe Island
- Goose Island
- Bog (Duck) Island
- Narrows Island
- Little Bear Island
- Little Pelican Island
- Gull Island
- Shingobee Island

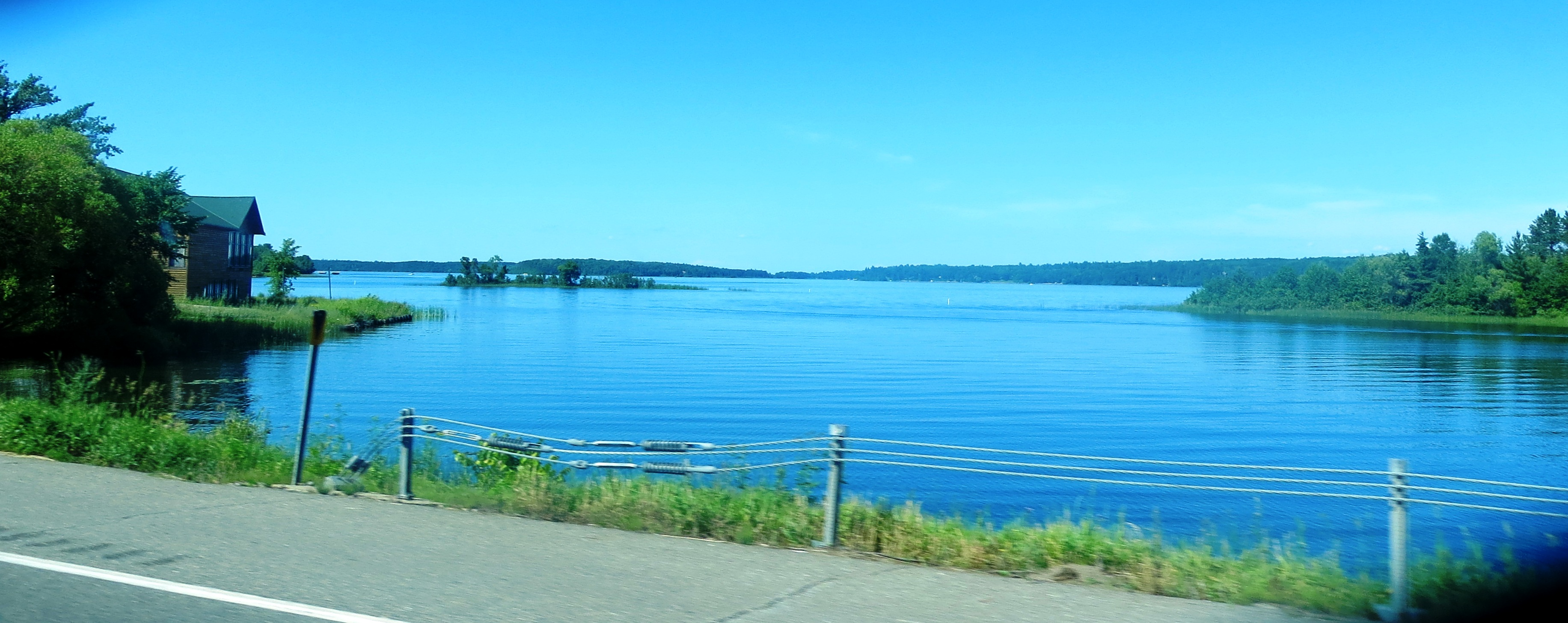
Shingobee Island in Walker bay

The long, narrow Shingobee Bay is part of Leech Lake, and is located on its southern end. Shingobee Bay, and the adjacent Walker Bay, boast some of the deepest parts in the entire lake.

== Ecology ==
=== Invasive species ===
- Lythrum salicaria

Also known as purple loosestrife. This is an invasive plant that takes over lake shores and marshes, replacing cattails and other native wetland plants. Purple loosestrife does not provide a sufficient food source, nesting area, or cover for the native animals. Also one plant can produce around two million seeds annually, and it spreads rapidly through aquatic systems.

- Typha angustifolia

Better known as the narrow-leaf cattail, this invasive plant is able to grow in deeper water (compared to its native counterparts). The narrow-leaf cattail competes with the native Typha latifolia (broad leaf cattail) and other native plants along Leech Lake.

=== Aquatic life ===
Leech Lake is a popular sport fishing hotspot, and is fished for many different types. The state record lake whitefish (12 lb, 4.5 oz) and pumpkinseed (1 lb, 5.6 oz) were both caught here in 1999.

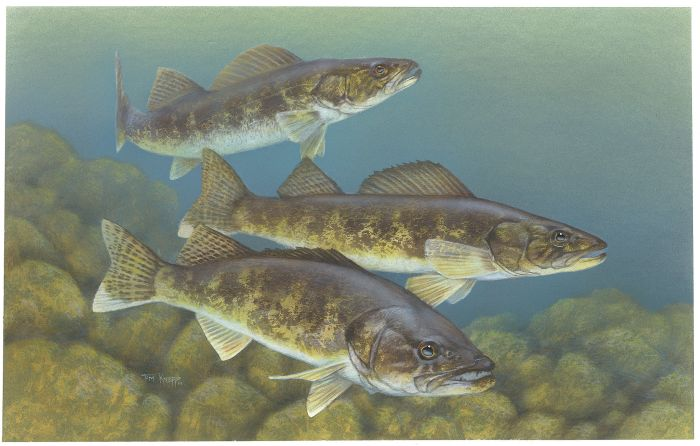
Walleye

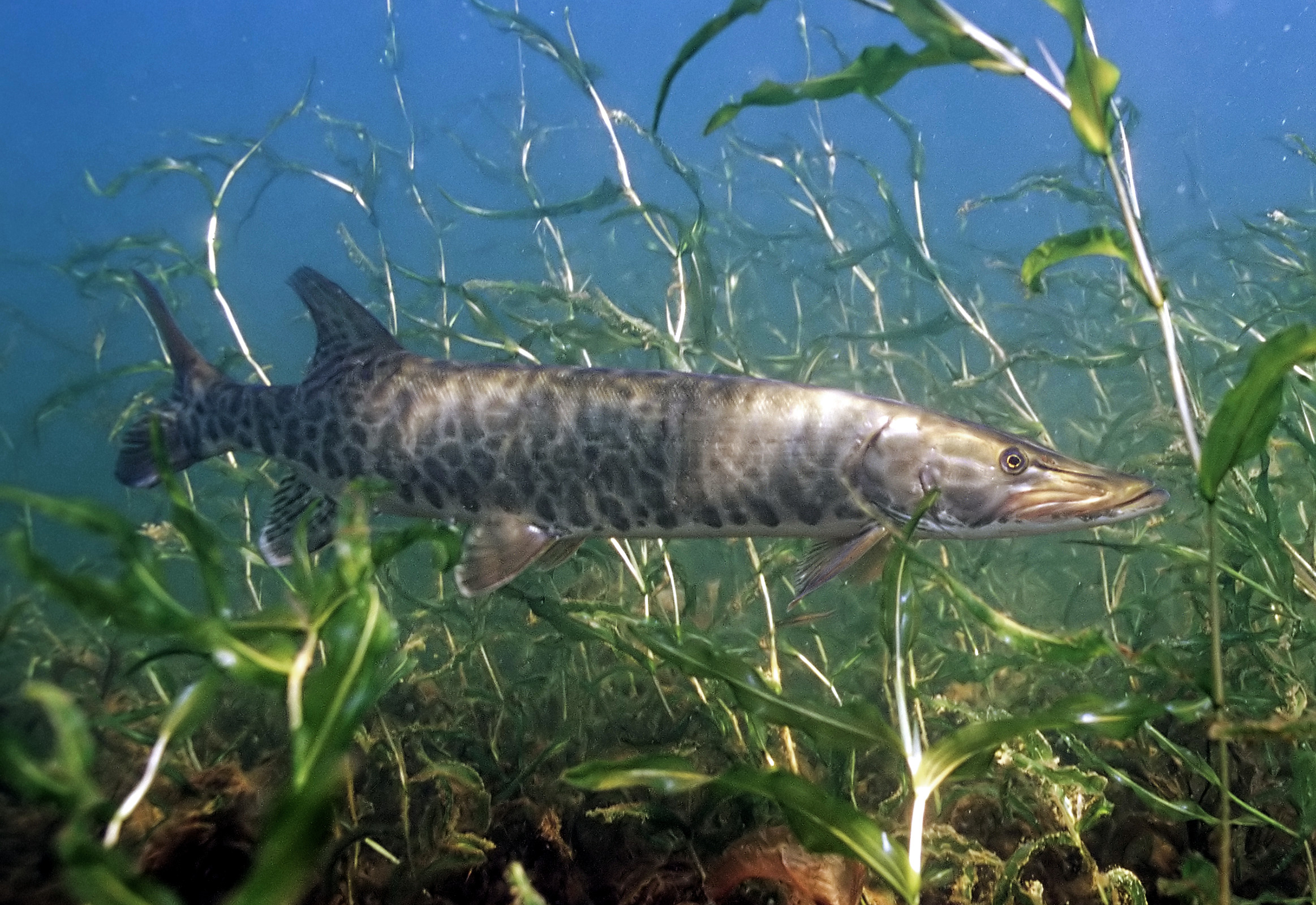
Muskellunge

Species of fish the lake contains:

- Black crappie
- Bowfin (dog fish)
- Bluegill
- Brown bullhead
- Catfish
- Cisco (Tullibee)
- Eelpout
- Hybrid sunfish
- Largemouth bass
- Muskellunge
- Northern pike (Jackfish)
- Pumpkinseed
- Rock bass
- Smallmouth bass
- Walleye
- White sucker
- Yellow bullhead
- Yellow perch

=== Vegetation ===
- Wild rice

Grows in the shallow depths of Leech Lake, emerging through over 4,000 acres of water. Wild Rice is a valuable crop for the Leech Lake community.

- Bulrush

Grass like plants that grow in water, they can reach lengths of around ten feet. These plants are an important food resources for aquatic life in Leech Lake.

=== Eagles ===
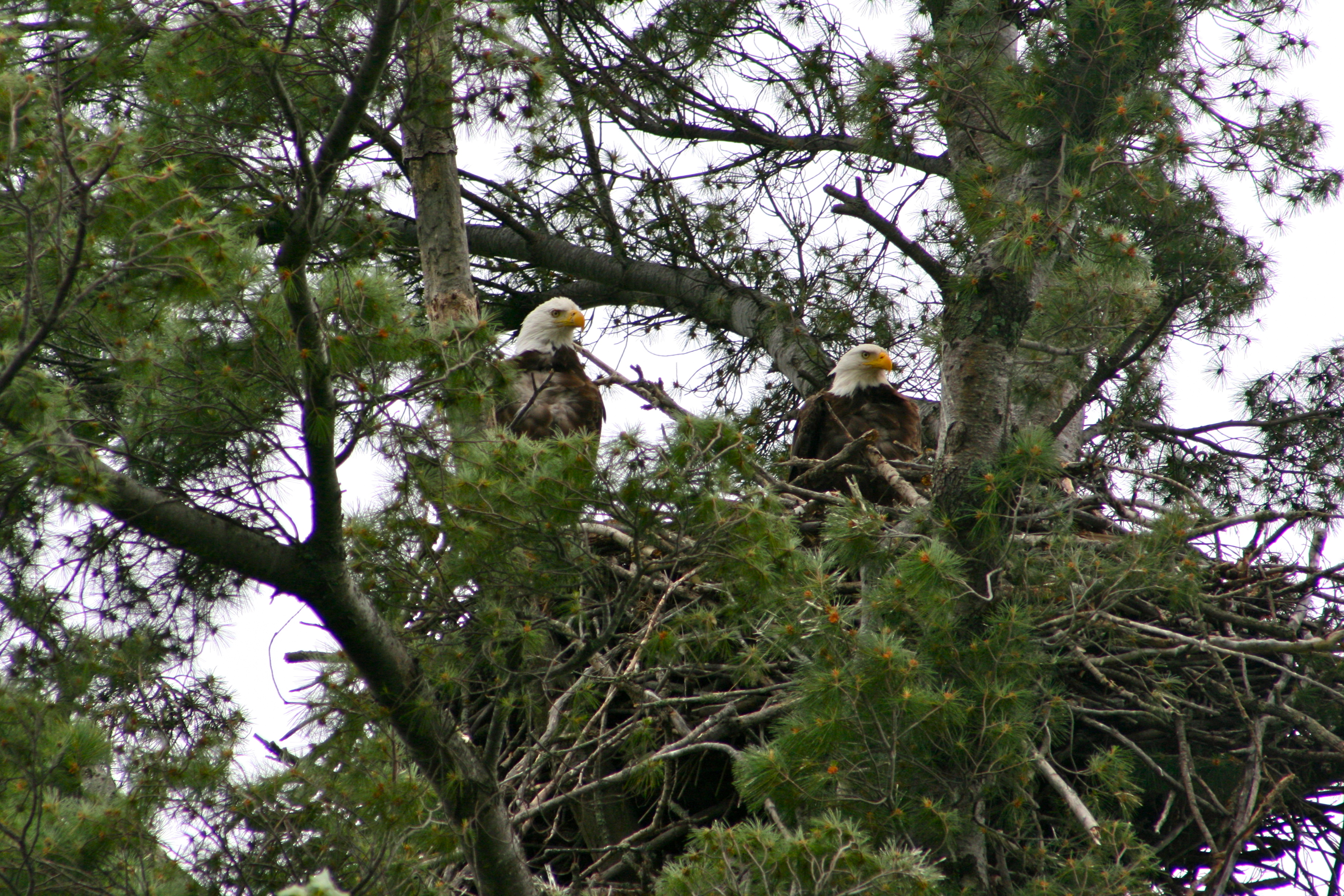
Two mature bald eagles nesting on the shores of Oak Point

Leech Lake and the surrounding national forest is home to a large population of bald eagles. They are known to return to their same nests when mature. Populations have risen over the last few decades.

== History ==
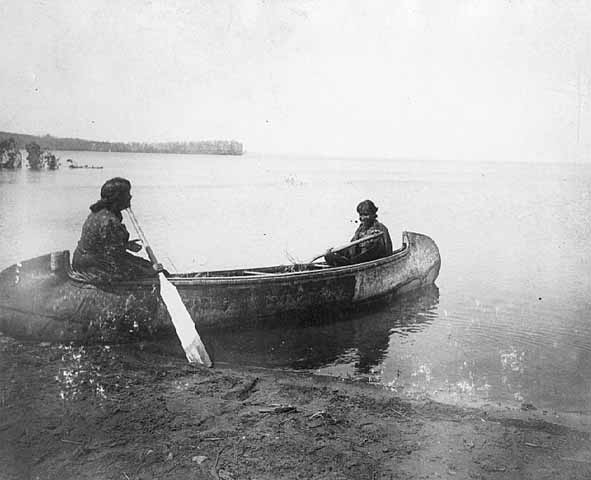
Ojibwa women in canoe, Leech Lake (before 1896)

On early maps, Leech Lake is identified in French as "lac Sangsue" (Bloodsucker Lake), which was then translated into English to its current name; its French name was translated from the Ojibwe "Ozagaskwaajimekaag-zaaga'igan" (lake abundant with bloodsuckers).

In 1855, the Leech Lake Indian Reservation was established on the south shore of Leech Lake, along with two other Indian Reservations in the area, which along with two additional Indian Reservations, the five Indian Reservations were amalgamated in 1936 to form the current "Greater" Leech Lake Indian Reservation which encompasses most all of Leech Lake.

On October 5, 1898, Leech Lake was the location of a conflict between Ojibwe and Federal troops of the United States, the Battle of Sugar Point. A firefight broke out between the 3rd U.S. Infantry Regiment and the Leech Lake Band of Ojibwe after one of the soldiers sent to retrieve a bootlegger mistakenly fired his rifle. Oscar Burkard received the Medal of Honor on August 21, 1899 for his participation in the battle.

In the summer of 1955, Leech Lake became famous for its musky fishing, as the "Leech Lake Musky Rampage" thrust it into the spotlight when hundreds of muskies were caught in a two-week period in July.

== Economy ==
=== Recreational/leisure use ===
Every February, Leech Lake is home to the International Eelpout Festival. The eelpout, also known as the Burbot, is rarely seen in Leech Lake, except in the winter when it is very plentiful. Events include a black-tie dinner, ice bowling, and a contest to see who can catch the largest eelpout.

=== Towns ===
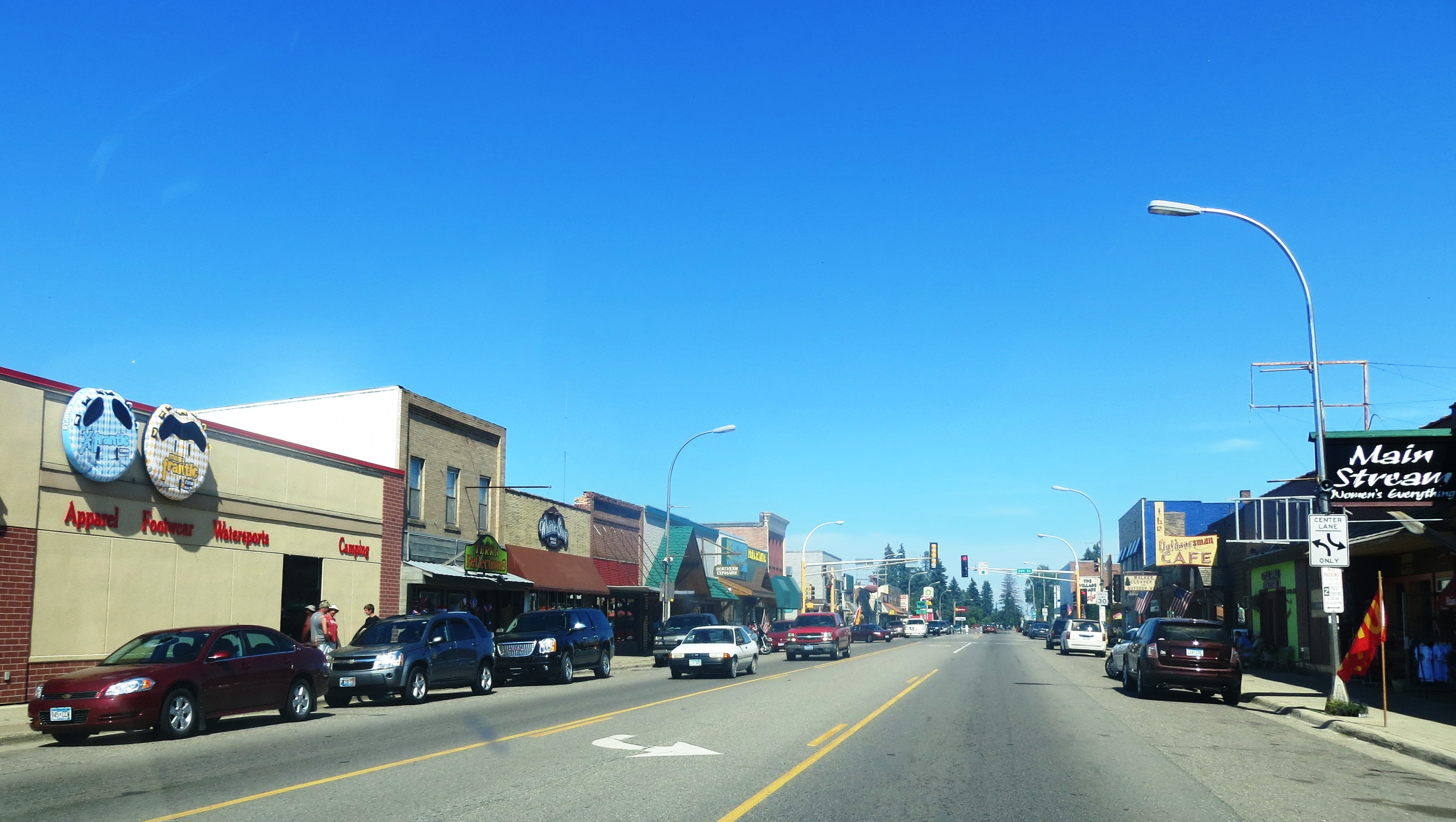
Walker, facing east down Main Street

- Ah-Gwah-Ching
- Brevik
- Federal Dam
- Leech Lake Township
- Onigum
- Remer
- Whipholt
- Walker
