= Theodore H. Rowell =

American politician

Theodore H. Rowell, Sr. (July 15, 1905 – September 26, 1979) was a pharmaceutical industrialist, outdoorsman, conservationist, and politician from Minnesota.

Rowell was born in Watertown, Wisconsin, and was the great grandson of John S. Rowell of Beaver Dam, Wisconsin (1825–1907), a notable pioneer inventor and manufacturer of farm machinery. In 1912, he moved with his family to Chetlo Harbor, Washington, where his father Joseph C. N. Rowell and uncle Douglas Rowell founded the Chetlo Harbor Packing Company, a salmon cannery. After canning 10,000 cases of salmon in 1914, the cannery failed in 1915. Ted and his family then moved to Warroad, Minnesota, and eventually settled at Wheeler's Point on Lake of the Woods, which is north of the town of Baudette, Minnesota.

Rowell studied pharmacy at the University of Minnesota, where he was the class president from 1926-27. Upon graduating in 1928, he returned to Baudette and opened a drugstore. Meanwhile, his father Joe continued in commercial fishing and also raised blue foxes for their fur. When fur buyers commented on the quality of his foxes' fur, Joe deduced that it was due to their diet consisting primarily of burbot, which is the only freshwater relative of the cod. The fish had no market value but came up in his nets and were fed to the foxes.

Ted in an early lab.

== Burbot Liver Oil and Rowell Laboratories, Inc. ==
Ted Rowell extracted oil from a burbot, and upon scientific assay, it was determined to be eight times more potent in vitamins A and D than cod liver oil, which was a big seller at the time. Ted and Joe thus formed the Burbot Liver Products Company in 1933, and began extracting, processing, bottling, and selling burbot liver oil. Over the years, the company became Rowell Laboratories, Inc., grew to manufacture more than 200 products, and became the largest industry and largest employer in Lake of the Woods county, adding multivitamins and minerals, and later becoming a national manufacturer of prescription drugs. Ted retired in 1966 and turned the direction of the company over to his son Ted, Jr. The company, later called Reid-Rowell Laboratories, has since become a subsidiary of Solvay Pharmaceuticals. Solvay, in 2008, sold the Baudette plants to ANI Pharmaceuticals where it stands today as a publicly traded company (ANIP).

Ted as 1954 University of Minnesota Homecoming King with Queen Carol Goulet (Mpls).

== Political career ==
Rowell was active in local and national politics, having served six years as Mayor of Baudette. During his term as mayor of Baudette, the city built a new hospital, sewage disposal plant, an international airport, a new city well system, and other projects. As Chairman of the International Bridge Committee, he successfully raised $1.6 million for construction of the International Bridge spanning the Rainy River, linking Baudette and Rainy River, Ontario. Ted started working on the bridge project in 1947 - the idea was sparked in a poker game. On May 24, 1955, Ted received a telegram from Senator Edward Thye telling him that the US Senate had just passed the bill authorizing the building of the 1,280-foot-long (390 m) traffic bridge across the Rainy River, linking Baudette, Minnesota with Rainy River, Ontario. After a dozen years of organizing and disappointments, construction was completed and the bridge was opened on July 1, 1960, before a crowd of 15,000 people. Hubert Humphrey, and Eugene McCarthy attended with WCCO radio covering the event. Ted was close personal friends with Minnesota Governor Luther Youngdahl, Governor Harold Stassen, and Senator Edward John Thye. Ted was a delegate to the 1948 Republican National Convention, where his friend Harold Stassen was the hands-down favorite to receive that year's Republican nomination for president. As Ted tells it, at this point during the convention Harold was asked to meet with northeastern money people, who then proceed to tell him how things were going to be, some of which Harold would not agree with. From this event on, Dewey was pushed hard by the party, and the tide at the convention turned, and New York Governor Thomas Dewey received the nomination.

Rowell Laboratories as it appeared in the 1940s.

== Other accomplishments ==
Rowell was named the Minnesota Tree Farmer of the Year and the Minnesota Small Businessman of the Year. He also received the University's Outstanding Achievement Award in 1959. He served as the vice-chairman of the Minnesota Republican State Central Committee and was a member of the Greater Upper Mississippi River Road Commission. In 1954, Rowell was honored for his outstanding achievements and was selected as the first Homecoming king of the University of Minnesota.

== Theodore H. Rowell Graduate Fellowship ==
After Ted's death, the Rowell family established the Theodore H. Rowell Graduate Fellowship at the University of Minnesota to support graduate students in the College of Pharmacy. The grants range from $3,000 to $6,000, with preference given to Minnesota residents who are US citizens.

Ted married Margaret Lawson in Warroad, Minnesota in 1929, and they had two children, Ted Jr. and Peggy. Rowell died on September 26, 1979.

== Rowell Laboratories, Inc. today ==
Rowell Laboratories, Inc. was reincorporated in 2008 as a Florida corporation and has since returned to its natural product roots. The company now manufactures natural and homeopathic healthcare products under the NatureCare brand in a cGMP quality FDA manufacturing facility.

== Publications ==
- "The Art of Coating Tablets by T.H. Rowell, copyright 1949".
- Article, contributions. TH Rowell, Drug and Cosmetic Ind. (1947), vol. 63, No. 4, pp. 459, 460, 549 to 551.
- "Two Men... and A Fish: The Story of Rowell Laboratories by Jenny Morman, copyright 1986".
- "Vitamins from Our Own Fish". Scientific American. April 1939: 215.
- "Conservation from a new angle: Account of burbot liver oil". Minnesota Conservationist. 1939: 19–20.
- Rowell, Theodore H. (July–August 1947). "Burbot – Producer of vitamins". Minnesota Conservation Volunteer. 10: 18–20.
- Official Report of the Proceedings of the 24th Republican National Convention, Philadelphia 1948, Pg. 121.

== Patents that reference "The Art of Coating Tablets" or other tableting articles written by Ted Rowell ==
- Continuous Process - Tablets. US Pat. 2955982 - Filed January 22, 1951
- Coated Tablets. US Pat. 2693436 - Filed February 27, 1951
- Coated Tablets - The Upjohn Company. US Pat. 2693437 - Filed February 27, 1951
- Marked Pharmaceutical Tablets and Making Same. US Pat. 3015609 - Filed January 26, 1953
- Method Of Marking The Same. US Pat. 2865810 - Filed October 7, 1955
- Marked Pharmaceutical Tablet. US Pat. 3015610 - Filed February 6, 1956
- Method Of Printing Waxed Pellets. US Pat. 2982234 - Filed October 4, 1957
- Method Of Printing Waxed Pellets. US Pat. 2925365 - Filed November 27, 1957
- Coloring Solid Pharmaceutical Forms. US Pat. 2925365 - Filed November 27, 1957
- Process Of Coating Pharmaceutical. US Pat. 3132074 - Filed May 28, 1959
- Granulating And Coating Tablets. US Pat. 3148123 - Filed May 17, 1960
- Process For Coating Pharmaceutical Solid. US Pat. 3607364 - Filed September 16, 1968.
