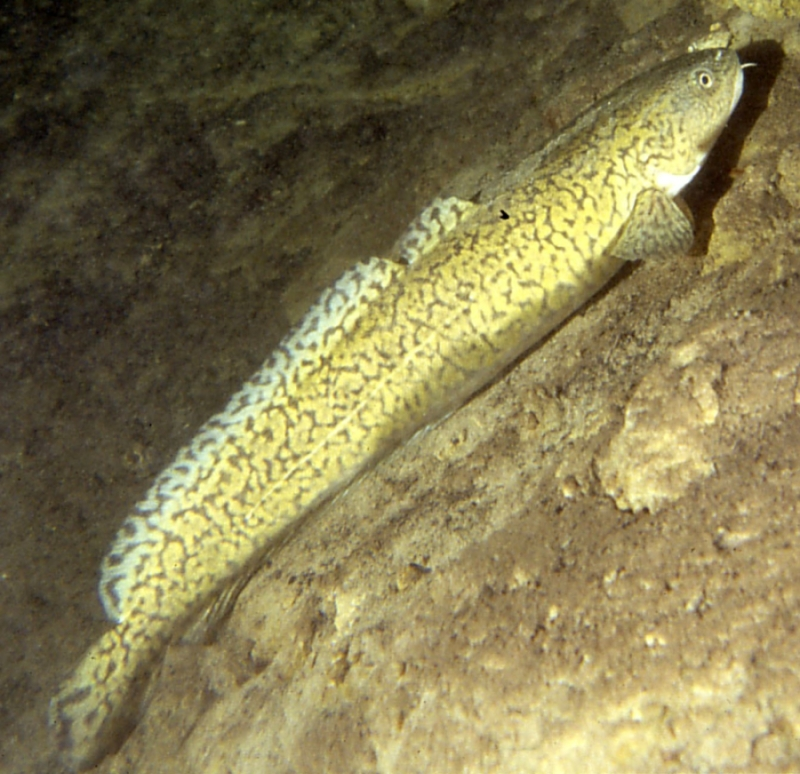

Conservation status
- Least Concern (IUCN 3.1)

Scientific classification
- Kingdom: Animalia
- Phylum: Chordata
- Class: Actinopterygii
- Division: Teleostei
- Order: Gadiformes
- Family: Lotidae
- Genus: Lota; Oken, 1817
- Species: L. lota

Binomial name
- Lota lota (Linnaeus, 1758)

Synonyms
- List: Gadus lota Linnaeus, 1758; Enchelyopus lota (Linnaeus, 1758); Molva lota (Linnaeus, 1758); Gadus lacustris Walbaum, 1792; Gadus maculosus Lesueur, 1817; Lota maculosa (Lesueur, 1817); Molva maculosa (Lesueur, 1817); Gadus compressus Lesueur, 1817; Lota compressa (Lesueur, 1817); Lota vulgaris Fitzinger, 1832; Lota fluviatilis Perty, 1832; Lota marmorata Koch, 1840; Lota inornata DeKay, 1842; Lota brosmiana Storer, 1842; Lota communis Rapp, 1854; Lota linnei Malm, 1877

= Burbot =

Species of fish

The burbot (Lota lota), also known as bubbot, mariah, loche, cusk, freshwater cod, freshwater ling, freshwater cusk, the lawyer, coney-fish, lingcod, or eelpout, is a species of coldwater ray-finned fish native to the subarctic regions of the Northern Hemisphere. It is the only member of the genus Lota, and is the only freshwater species of the order Gadiformes. The species is closely related to marine fish such as the common ling and cusk, all of which belong to the family Lotidae (rocklings).

== Etymology ==
The name burbot comes from the Latin word barba, meaning beard, referring to its single chin whisker, or barbel. Its generic and specific names, Lota lota, comes from the old French lotte fish, which is also named "barbot" in Old French.

== Distribution ==
Burbot have circumpolar distribution above 40° N. Populations are continuous from France across Europe and chiefly Russian Asia to the Bering Strait. In North America, burbot range from the Seward Peninsula in Alaska to New Brunswick along the Atlantic Coast. Burbot are most common in streams and lakes of North America and Europe. They are fairly common in Lake Erie, but are also found in the other Great Lakes. An anadromous population also lives in the brackish waters of the Baltic Sea. Recent genetic analysis suggests the geographic pattern of burbot may indicate multiple species or subspecies, making this single taxon somewhat misleading.

=== United Kingdom ===
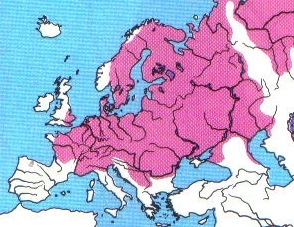
Burbot European geographic distribution

In the United Kingdom, the burbot is possibly extinct. The last recorded capture was a specimen weighing 0.48 kg (1 lb 1 oz), in July 1970, by Stephen Mackinder, from the Cut-off Channel or the Great Ouse Relief Channel, at Denver, Norfolk. In October 1970, it was described in the Guinness Book of Records as the "rarest British fish" which was "almost extinct", so it had been "agreed that no record for this species should be published, at least until 1974, in the interests of conservation". The burbot may still survive in the UK. The counties of Cambridgeshire, Norfolk and Yorkshire (particularly the River Derwent or Yorkshire Ouse) seem to be the strongest candidates for areas in which the species might yet survive. Plans to reintroduce this freshwater member of the cod family back into British waters were under investigation in 2020.

== Description ==
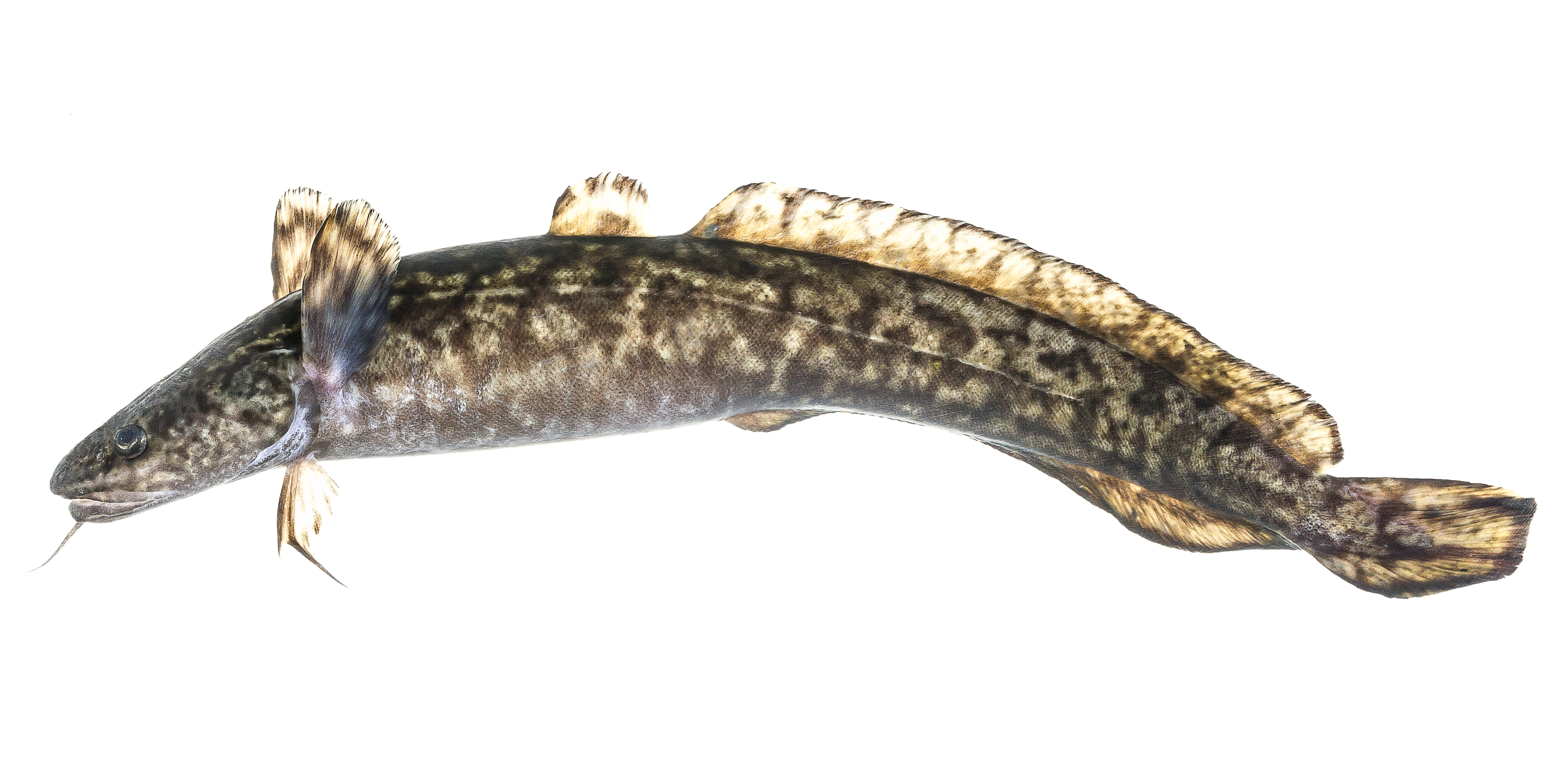
At Gavins Point National Fish Hatchery

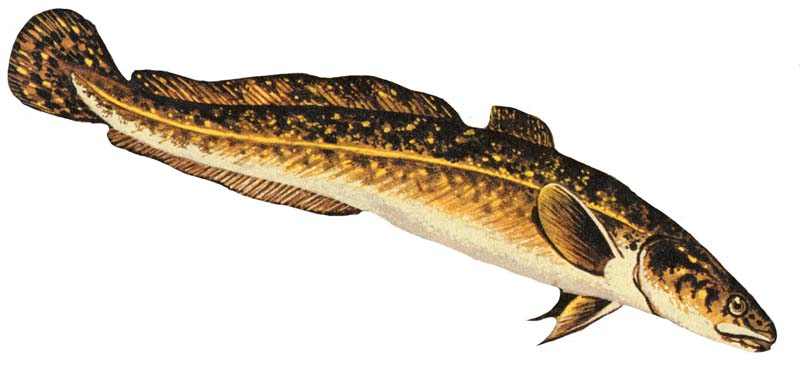
Burbot, Lota lota

With an appearance like a cross between a catfish and an eel, the burbot has a serpent-like body, but is easily distinguished by a single barbel on the chin. The body is elongated and laterally compressed, with a flattened head and single, tube-like projection for each nostril. The mouth is wide, with both upper and lower jaws having many small teeth. Burbot have two soft dorsal fins, with the first being low and short, and the second being much longer. The anal fin is low and almost as long as the dorsal fin. The caudal fin is rounded, the pectoral fins are fan-shaped, and pelvic fins are narrow with an elongated second fin ray. Having such small fins relative to body size indicates a benthic lifestyle with low swimming endurance, unable to withstand strong currents.

Although it appears scaleless, the burbot bears minute, nearly microscopic scales. They are relatively long-lived and slow-growing; in Alaska, it generally takes 5-7 years for the burbot to reach the length of 18 inches, individuals typically reach sexual maturity at 6-7 years of age and it is not uncommon to find individuals over 20 years old.

== Ecology ==
=== Habitat ===
Burbot live in large, cold rivers, lakes, and reservoirs, primarily preferring freshwater habitats, but able to thrive in brackish environments for spawning. For some time of the year, the burbot lives under ice, and it requires frigid temperatures to breed. During the summer, they are typically found in the colder water below the thermocline. In Lake Superior, burbot can live at depths below 300 m (980 ft). As benthic fish, they tolerate an array of substrate types, including mud, sand, rubble, boulder, silt, and gravel, for feeding. Adults construct extensive burrows in the substrate for shelter during the day. Burbot are active crepuscular hunters. Burbot populations are adfluvial during the winter, and they migrate to near-shore reefs and shoals to spawn, preferring spawning grounds of sand or gravel.

=== Life history ===
Burbot reach sexual maturity at between four and seven years of age. Unlike most freshwater fish, they spawn in mid to late winter. Spawning season typically occurs between December and March, often under ice at extremely low temperatures ranging between 1 and 5 °C. During a relatively short season lasting from two to three weeks, burbot spawn multiple times, but not every year.

As broadcast spawners, burbot do not have an explicit nesting site, but rather release eggs and sperm into the water column to drift and settle. When spawning, many male burbot gather around one or two females, forming a spawning ball. Writhing in the open water, males and females simultaneously release sperm and eggs. Depending on water temperatures, the incubation period of the eggs lasts from 30 to 128 days. Fertilized eggs then drift until they settle into cracks and voids in the substrate.

Depending on body size, female burbot fecundity ranges from 63,000 to 3,478,000 eggs for each clutch. Rate of growth, longevity, and age of sexual maturity of burbot are strongly correlated with water temperature; large, older individuals produce more eggs than small, younger individuals. Eggs are round with a large oil globule, about 1 mm (0.039 in) in diameter and have an optimal incubation range between 1 and 7 °C (34 and 45 °F).

Newly hatched burbot larvae are pelagic, passively drifting in the open water. Habitats near 4 °C (39 °F) are optimal for burbot and they prefer water temperatures of 12 °C (54 °F) and lower. By night, juveniles are active, taking shelter during the day under rocks and other debris. Growing rapidly in their first year, burbot reach between 11 and 12 cm (4.3 and 4.7 in) in total length by late fall. During their second year of life, burbot on average grow another 10 cm (3.9 in).

Burbot transition from pelagic habitats to benthic environments as they reach adulthood, around five years old. Average length of burbot by maturity is about 40 cm (16 in), with slight sexual dimorphism. Maximum lengths range between 30 and 120 cm (12 and 47 in), and weights range from 1.0 to 12 kg (2.2 to 26.5 lb).

=== Diet and predators ===
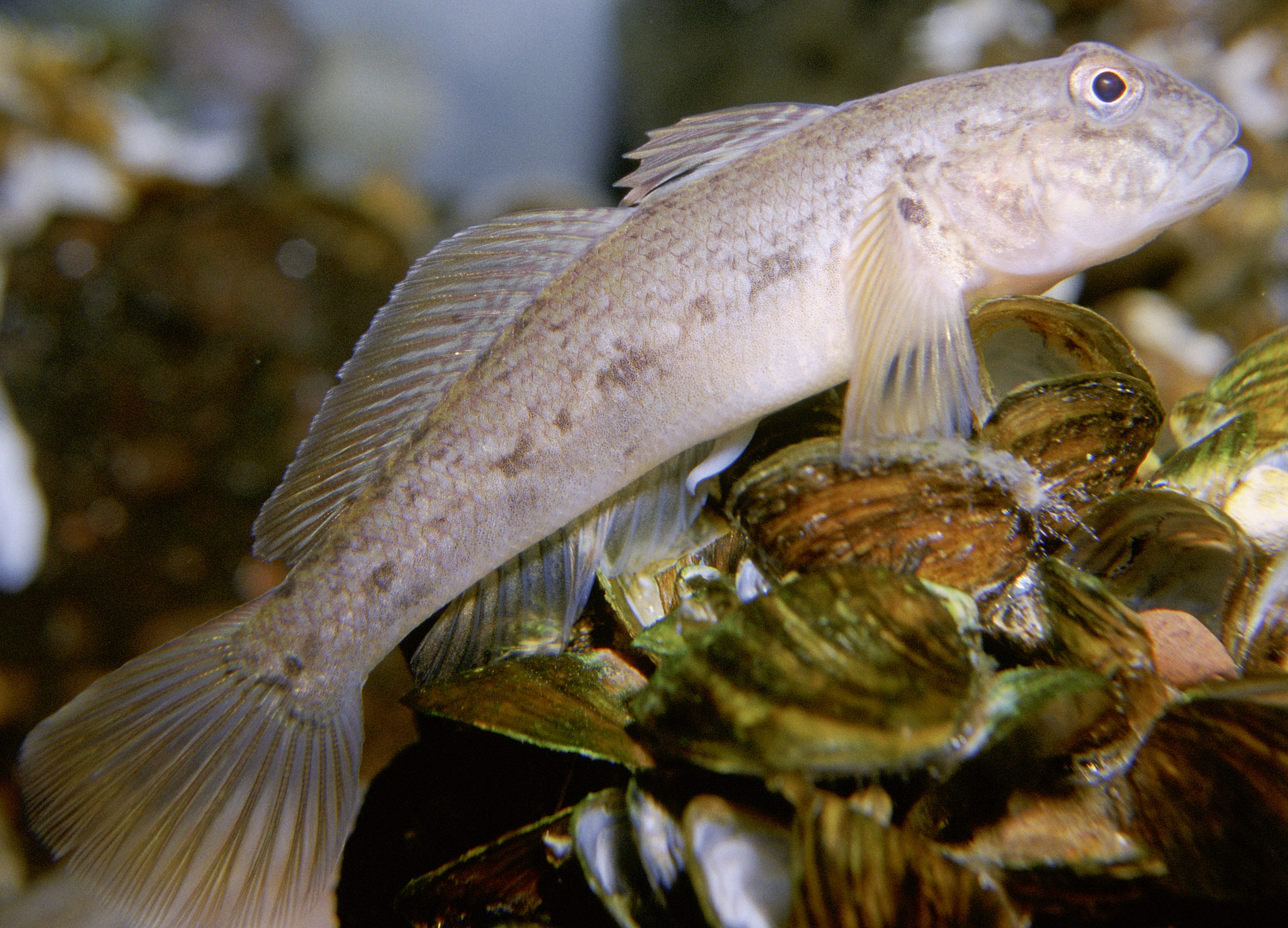
Following its arrival in Lake Erie in 1999, the invasive round goby has become the most common prey of burbot in the lake

At the larval stage, month-old burbot begin exogenous feeding, consuming food through the mouth and digesting in the intestines. Burbot at the larval stage and into the juvenile stage feed on invertebrates based on size. Under 1 cm (0.39 in), burbot eat copepods and cladocerans, and above 1–2 cm (0.39–0.79 in), zooplankton and amphipods. As adults, they are primarily piscivores, preying on lamprey, whitefish, grayling, young northern pike, suckers, stickleback, trout, and perch. In eastern Lake Erie, burbot prey heavily on the introduced round goby, which make up the majority of their prey. While historically burbot preyed most frequently on rainbow smelt, gobies became an increasingly large part of their diet following their spread into the eastern part of the lake in 1999. A 2009 investigation by the Great Lakes Fishery Commission noted that gobies were present in the stomachs of 71% of all caught burbot, with smelt, the next most common prey item, only being present in 23%. In 2010, around 60% of a given year's gobies were estimated to be eaten by burbot, accounting for roughly half of the burbots' diet by weight, which was associated with the slowing and eventual halting of the gobies' population rise in the area. At times, burbot also eat insects and other macroinvertebrates, and have been known to eat frogs, snakes, and birds. Having such a wide diet is also correlated to their tendency to bite lures, making them very easy to catch. Burbot are preyed upon by northern pike, muskellunge, and some lamprey species.

== Commercial significance ==
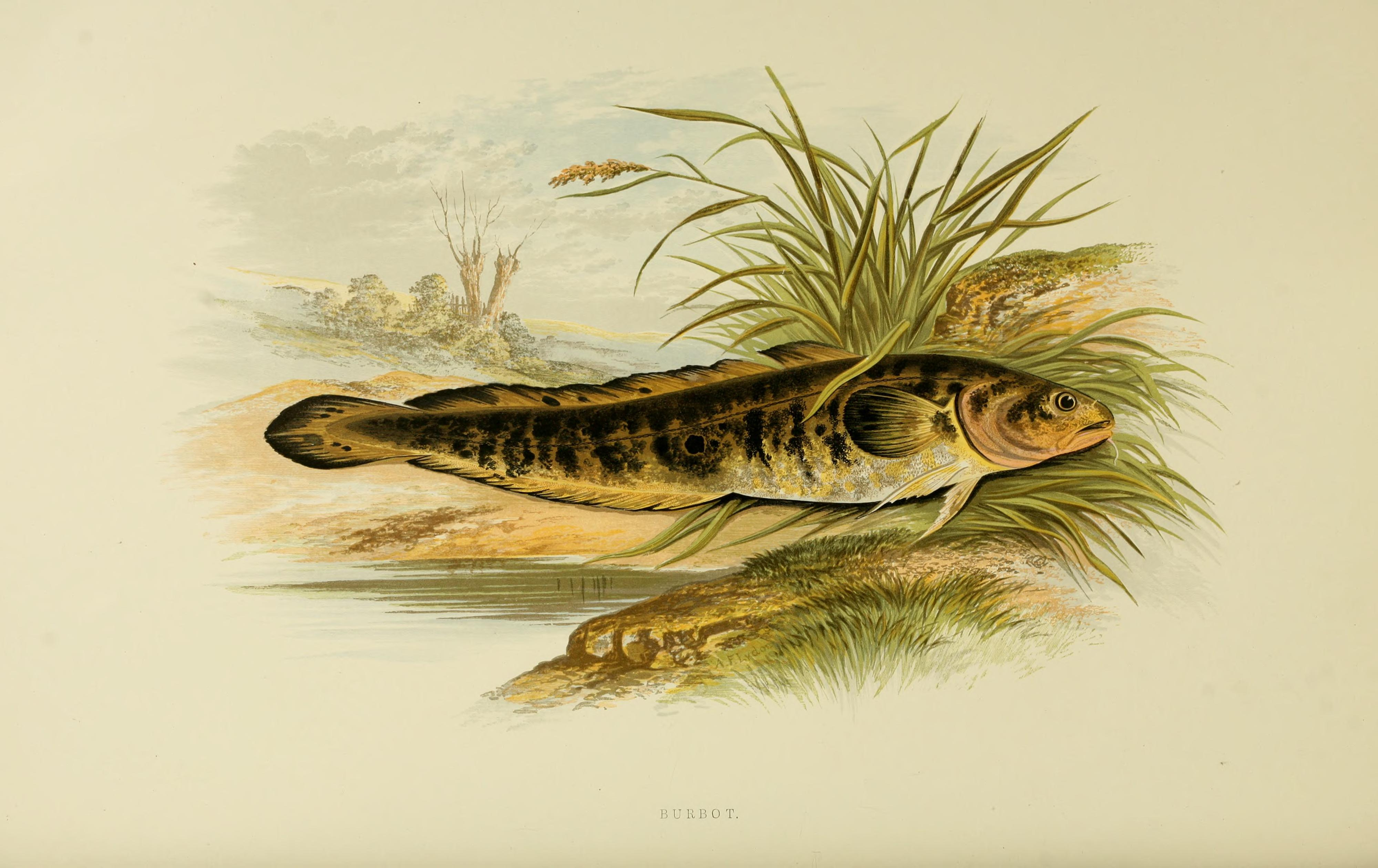
An 1879 illustration by Alexander Francis Lydon

A book written in 1590 in England notes that burbot were so common that they were used to feed hogs.

The burbot is edible. In Finland, its roe and liver are highly regarded as delicacies, as is the fish itself. An annual spearfishing tournament is held near Roblin, Manitoba. One of the highlights of the tournament is the fish fry, where the day's catch is served deep-fried. When cooked, burbot meat tastes very similar to American lobster, leading to the burbot's nickname of "poor man's lobster".

In the 1920s, Minnesota druggist Theodore "Ted" H. Rowell and his father, Joseph Rowell, a commercial fisherman on Lake of the Woods, were using the burbot as feed for the foxes on Joe's blue fox farm. They discovered the burbot contained something that improved the quality of the foxes' furs; this was confirmed by the fur buyers, who commented that these furs were superior to other blue fox furs they were seeing. Ted Rowell felt it was something in the burbot, so he extracted some oil and sent it away to be assayed. The result of the assay was that the liver of the burbot has three to four times the potency in vitamin D, and four to 10 times in vitamin A, than "good grades" of cod-liver oil. Their vitamin content varies from lake to lake, where their diets may have some variation. Additionally, liver makes up about 10% of the fish's total body weight, and its liver is six times the size of those of freshwater fish of comparable size. The oil is lower in viscosity, and more rapidly digested and assimilated than most other fish-liver oils. Rowell went on to found the Burbot Liver Products Company, which later became Rowell Laboratories, Inc.

== Angling ==
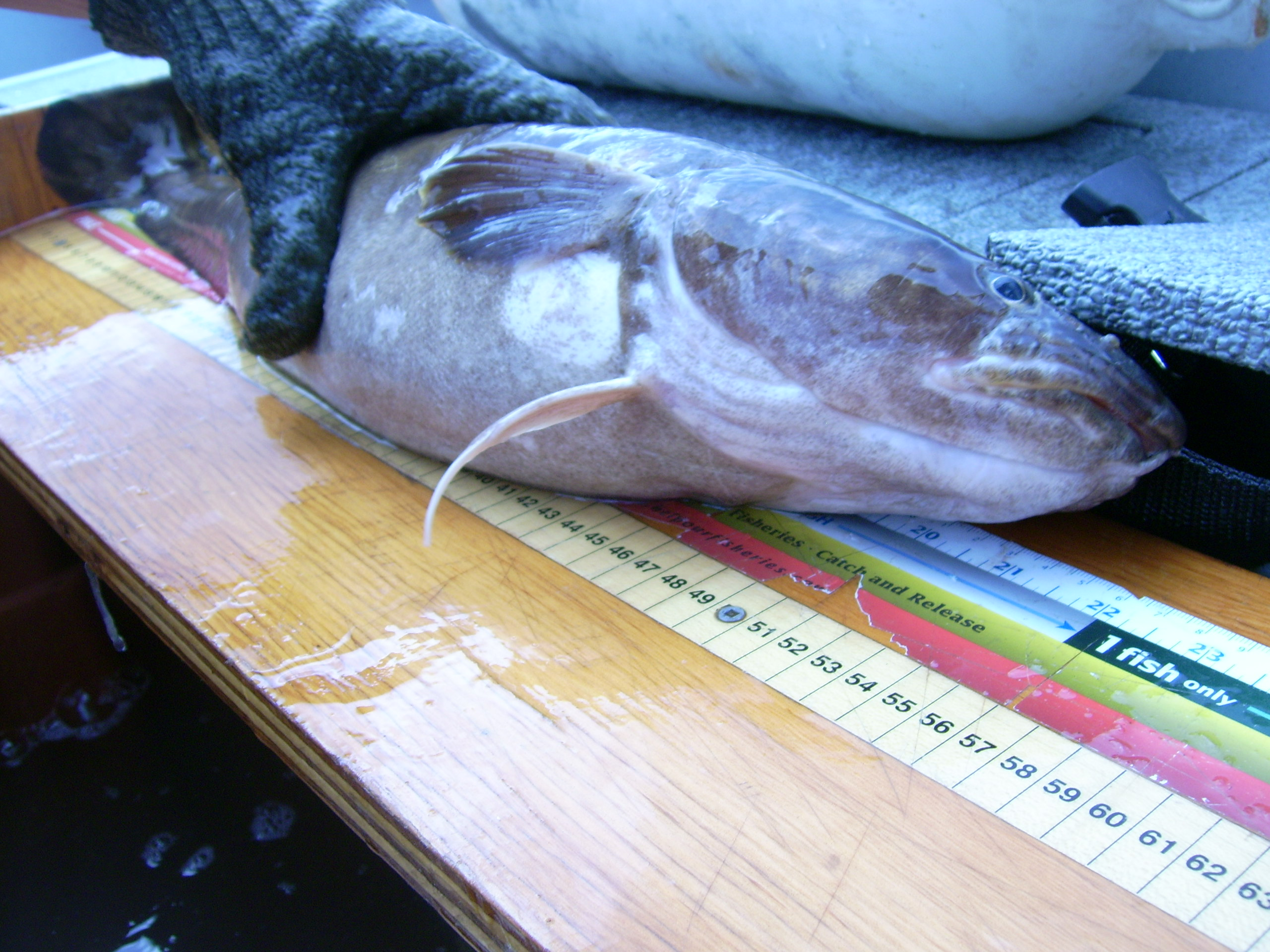
Batchawana Bay, Lake Superior

The IGFA recognizes the world-record burbot as caught on Lake Diefenbaker, Saskatchewan, Canada, by Sean Konrad on 27 March 2010. The fish weighed 11.4 kg (25 lb 2 oz).

The burbot is a tenacious predator, which sometimes attacks other fish of almost the same size, and as such, can be a nuisance fish in waters where it is not native. Recent discoveries of burbot in the Green River at Flaming Gorge Reservoir in Utah have concerned wildlife biologists, who fear the burbot could decimate the sport-fish population in what is recognized as one of the world's top brown trout fisheries, because it often feeds on the eggs of other fish in the lake, such as sockeye salmon. The Utah Division of Fish and Game has instituted a "no release" "catch and kill" regulation for the burbot in Utah waterways. However, the regulations have been found to be largely unenforceable.

The town of Walker, Minnesota, holds an International Eelpout Festival every winter on Leech Lake. The festival received national attention on 4 March 2011, when a correspondent from The Tonight Show with Jay Leno did a segment on the event.

== Conservation status ==
Burbot populations are difficult to study, due to their deep-water habitats and reproduction under ice. Although burbot global distribution is widespread and abundant, many populations have been threatened or extirpated. Ichthyologists and taxonomists recommend a review of older taxonomic records due to the new genetic insight that there are two species of burbot: the European burbot (Lota lota) and the North American burbot (Lota maculosa).

Since the burbot lacks popularity in commercial fishing, many regions do not undertake management planning. Pollution and habitat change, such as river damming, appear to be the primary causes for riverine burbot population declines, while pollution and the adverse effects of invasive species have the greatest influence on lacustrine populations. Management of burbot is low priority, and non-existent in some regions.

The Kootenai tribe of Idaho and their partners undertook conservation efforts to enhance burbot populations in their region.
