= Leech Lake River =

- Mouth of Leech Lake River

Location
- Country: United States
- State: Minnesota
- County: Cass County

Physical characteristics
- Source
  - coordinates: 47.2477325°N 94.2216305°W
- Mouth
  - coordinates: 47.3013410°N 93.9032785°W

The Leech Lake River is a 50-mile-long river in north-central Minnesota. Flowing eastward from Leech Lake, it acts as a primary tributary and headwaters reservoir for the Mississippi River. The river runs through Cass County and is bordered by the Leech Lake Indian Reservation and the Chippewa National Forest

== See also ==
- List of rivers of Minnesota
