= Shingobee Lake =

Lake in the state of Minnesota, United States

- Location within Minnesota
- Location: Hubbard County, Minnesota
- Coordinates: 47°0′14″N 94°41′20″W
- Type: lake

Shingobee Lake is a lake in Hubbard County, in the U.S. state of Minnesota.

Shingobee is a name derived from an Ojibwe language word for a type of evergreen.

== See also ==
- List of lakes in Minnesota
