= Chetlo Harbor, Washington =

Ghost town in Washington (state)

- Ghost town
- Location of Naselle, Washington
- Coordinates: 46°27′32″N 123°55′44″W
- Country: United States
- State: Washington
- County: Pacific

Area
  - Water: 0.0 sq mi (0 km^{2})
- Elevation: 33 ft (10 m)

Population (ca. 1910)
  - Total: 50
- Time zone: UTC-8 (Pacific (PST))
  - Summer (DST): UTC-7 (PDT)
- Area code(s): 360, 564
- FIPS code: 53-48015
- GNIS feature ID: 1512495

Chetlo Harbor, also known as over the years as Cougar Bend, Napoleon, and Stanley, was a small settlement located near the southwest coast of Washington State, in the southeast corner of Willapa Bay at the mouth of the Naselle River. The population of the settlement was approximately 50 at its peak. The businesses there over the years consisted of a salmon fishery and canning operation, a logging operation, and a mining company. Chetlo, or Jetlo, is a Chinook Jargon word meaning oyster.

== History ==
This isolated area had no roads on the lower river and not over four or five power boats on the whole river. The gas engine was not very reliable in those days. The people were served by a boat out of South Bend once a week, bringing the mail, freight, and passengers, if any. The lack of transport was why there were one-room schools all up and down the river, some only a couple of miles apart.

All the log towing was done by tugs, and there was quite a fleet of them; the Flora Brown, Agnes, Launel, Myrtle, Queen, and the Defender. The Defender was the newest and most powerful, but it did not work out because it had too much power and speed. When it was pushing the logs, they went out under the tailstick. The loss and salvage almost broke the owner. Someone decided to do something about the isolation on the lower river.

A town was platted a mile or two below the present highway bridge on the west side of the river and above the old Sunshine Mill. The machinery from the mill had been moved to South Bend years before. The town started out as Napoleon, then later named Chetlo Harbor. A dock and a store were built and building lots were sold.

A sawmill was begun over the straits, despite the lack of water there at low tide. The mill was never finished. When it was almost done it burned and was never rebuilt. There was a boardwalk from the town over to the mill, a quarter of a mile or so through the woods.

The Chetlo Harbor Packing Company was owned by Joe Rowell and Douglas Rowell, (who were brothers), and an attorney named Horne (their cousin). The operation fished prior to opening a cannery and sold its catch to fish buyers. In 1914, a cannery was constructed and Nick Kussman was hired as foreman. The operation was ready for the fall 1914 salmon season and canned 10,000 cases. The cannery was caught in the price squeeze initiated by the coastal salmon trust, in its attempt to put small Alaskan canneries out of business. The cannery ceased operation in 1915. It had employed 30-40 people. A post office was established on December 19, 1911, and closed on February 15, 1918.
