= John Samuel Rowell =

American politician (1825–1907)

John Samuel Rowell (April 1, 1825 – October 21, 1907) was an American agricultural inventor and pioneer manufacturer. Born in Springwater, New York, and living his adult life in Beaver Dam, Wisconsin, he held more than 40 patents for farm machinery and agricultural implement improvements, including the patent on the cultivator tooth. He is the great grandfather of Theodore H. Rowell, noted Minnesota pharmaceutical inventor, entrepreneur, and founder of Rowell Laboratories, Inc. Rowell was obsessed with the idea of improving the old methods of soil cultivation. His inventive genius and perseverance enabled him to make his dreams become a reality and become a benefactor to mankind.

John Samuel Rowell in the 1870s

== Early life ==
At the age of 15, he went to work for his brother George Rowell in Goshen, Indiana, who owned a plow foundry and blacksmith's shop, and learned the trade of plow making. John Rowell saved his money and at the age of 18, traded his earthly possessions for plow castings, borrowed some carpenters tools and axes, went into the timber, and by himself, chopped down the trees, hewed and scored the sills and framework and constructed his first foundry and factory. He then began turning out cast iron plows from his new foundry. The endeavors of an 18‑year‑old to build a foundry created some interest in the surrounding countryside. He conducted this business for about 3 years and saved $1,500.

The JS Rowell factory in the late 1800s

== The JS Rowell Manufacturing Company ==
In 1855, he purchased a small building and foundry for $400 on Mill Street, later named Rowell Street, in Beaver Dam, Wisc., which he used to make plows to sell to the local trade. Upon purchasing, he moved his family to the small apartment upstairs. In 1860 he built and patented the first successful "broad case seeder" ever put on the market. In 1861, he built a combination seeder-cultivator with a "Slip Tooth" to prevent breakage when hitting rocks while cultivating, which he patented; this was to guarantee his success.

He incorporated the company in 1888 with $100,000 in capital stock, of which $40,000 in cash was contributed by JS Rowell and the remaining $60,000, shown on the previous company's books at cost or good will, were contributed by the owners via the assets from the previous unincorporated JS Rowell Manufacturing Company, although the assets had a market value of nearly twice that amount. The company manufactured 26 different kinds of machines at this time. JS Rowell held 25% interest in the company, with each of his sons Samuel W. and Theodore B. each owning 25%, nephew Ira 12.5% and the remaining 12.5% divided up among his grandchildren. By 1900 Rowell, and sons Samuel and Theodore, were each receiving an annual salary of $3,000. Management salaries from 1868 to 1904 totaled approximately $125,000. Rowell owned the land the company sat on and collected an annual rent of $1,000. From 1888 to 1904, the factory had manufactured and sold 9,900 machines. Annual Net Profitability ran consistently at 15-16%.

By 1888, Rowell was receiving royalties from the company of $1 per machine in which one of his patents were used. Numerous companies in the seeder cultivator industry were also paying a higher royalty for using Rowell patents including the Van Brunt Seeder Manufactory in Horicon, Wisconsin, which was later purchased in 1912 by a firm that would be acquired by John Deere. Rowell also invented the "Force Feed" for grain drills, harrows, hay rakes, fanning mills, and Tiger Threshing machines. Sales of these machines were throughout the Midwest, Canada, Germany, South America, Russia, to which many Rowell Tiger Threshers were sold, and South Africa. He has built up one of the largest manufactories of the state, and gained for himself a comfortable fortune, with the factory employing more than 200 employees. Among the assets of the firm were 6 pedigreed trotting horses, including Badger Girl a champion trotter. The book value of these horses was placed at $4,200 in 1889, with their market value being higher. One large distributor was the Northwestern Implement Company in St. Paul, Minnesota, which was acting agent for the firm for Minnesota, the Dakotas, and Montana to sell Rowell seeders, hay rakes, grain drills, and threshing machinery. Total orders accepted, shipped, and settled from this one distributor for 1887 was $72,822.47.

The JS Rowell employees about 1869

Rowell was vigilant in defending his patents, even fighting patent infringements all the way to the US Supreme Court. In Rowell v. Lindsay, 113 US 97 (1885), Rowell and his brother Ira filed with the court to restrain the infringement of reissued letters patent No. 2,909, dated March 31, 1868, one of only 5 or 6 patent cases ever heard by the court. The court found that the defendants had not used every element of the Rowell Patent and therefore dismissed the plaintiff's case.

== Politics ==
Rowell served as mayor of Beaver Dam for 2 terms first in 1868 and later in 1886, and as alderman for 2 terms. He also had an unsuccessful run for the US House of Representatives for Wisconsin US Congressional District 2 on Nov. 7, 1882, in which he lost by 1,801 votes to Daniel H. Sumner (a Democrat).

== Career and accomplishments ==
The name John S. Rowell, founder and president of the J. S. Rowell Manufacturing Company, makers of the Tiger Seeders and Grain Drills, hay rakes, and cultivators, holds a high place in the list of inventors of practical agricultural implements. Like a number of men of his time, he achieved success in the agricultural implement world with no opportunity other than those produced by his own efforts. In addition to founding the JS Rowell Manufacturing Company, he was also one of the 1881 incorporators and a director of the Beaver Dam Cotton Mills, as a founding incorporator and director of the Beaver Dam Malleable Iron Works which grew to titanic proportions, Beaver Dam Electric Light Company, and president of the Old National Bank in Beaver Dam from 1896 until his death in 1907.

Rowell died of gangrene at his home in Beaver Dam on October 21, 1907.

When Rowell died, the mayor of Beaver Dam, M. J. Jacobs, proclaimed, “For over sixty years [Rowell] has been an upright, enterprising, industrious, patriotic, public spirited and continuous resident of our city, and at all times prominently identified with its industrial development and business life. Furthermore, Mayor Jacobs requested “…that all business places, manufacturing concerns, and official places of business be closed during the afternoon of his funeral on Wednesday, October 23, 1907 from 1 until 4:30 o’clock, and that the city flag during all of said be displayed at half mast, and that all our citizens who can conveniently do so, attend the funeral of one of the most worthy and esteemed citizens who has ever resided in our midst.”

== Patents ==
- Improvements in Water Wheels, No. 23,611 dated April 12, 1859
- Improvement in Seeding Machines, No. 36,672 dated October 14, 1862;
- Improvement in Cultivators, No. 56,102 dated July 3, 1866
- New and Improved Cultivator, No. 2,909 dated March 31, 1868
- Cultivator Tooth, No. 232,850 dated October 5, 1880;
- Cultivator Tooth, No. 10,076 dated April 4, 1882;
- Seeder or Cultivator Tooth, No. 256,922 dated April 25, 1882.
- patent No. 97,317, granted November 30, 1869
