= Shingobee Bay =

Bay in Minnesota, U.S.

Coordinates: 47°03′19″N 94°33′51″W

Shingobee Bay is a bay of Leech Lake, Minnesota.

== Information ==
Shingobee Bay is located three miles south of Walker, the Cass County seat, on the southern side of Leech Lake. The land adjacent to the bay is part of Shingobee Township, and a portion of it is allocated to the Leech Lake Tribe of Ojibwe.

Minnesota State Highway 371 spans the northern end of the bay, where it opens up into the larger Walker Bay.

=== Miller Bay ===
Miller Bay is an extension of the longer, narrower Shingobee Bay, and is located on the northeastern side of Shingobee. Miller Bay is connected to Shingobee by a fairly wide channel visible from Christmas Point Road, which loops around Miller Bay in a rough semicircle. There is no public access on Miller Bay, although it is easily visible from nearby roads. The Paul Bunyan State Trail, used for various recreational purposes, is quite close to Miller Bay, and its Shingobee Connection Trail runs on the opposite side of Christmas Point Road from the bay.

=== Public access ===
A public boating access is located on Shingobee Island, which is crossed by Highway 371 on the north side of the lake. The island, though in the middle of the bay, is connected to land on either side by the highway.

=== Fishing ===
Walker Bay, which includes Shingobee, is the deepest part of Leech Lake. As of May 2010, there was a significant amount of crappies caught in Shingobee Bay.
