= List of longest rivers of the United States by state =

This is a list of longest rivers in the United States by state. It includes rivers that pass through the state or compose a portion of the state's border, as well as rivers entirely contained within the state.

== Alabama ==
1. Tennessee River – 652 miles (1,049 km)
2. Chattahoochee River – 430 miles (690 km)
3. Alabama River – 318 miles (512 km)
4. Coosa River – 280 miles (450 km)
5. Tallapoosa River – 265 miles (426 km)
6. Tombigbee River – 200 miles (320 km)
7. Conecuh River – 198 miles (319 km)
8. Elk River – 195 miles (314 km)
9. Cahaba River – 194 miles (312 km)
10. Black Warrior River – 178 miles (286 km)

The Alabama River is the longest river that is entirely within Alabama. See also List of rivers of Alabama.

== Alaska ==
1. Yukon River – 1,980 miles (3,190 km)
2. Kuskokwim River – 702 miles (1,130 km)
3. Porcupine River – 569 miles (916 km)
4. Tanana River – 569 miles (916 km)
5. Innoko River – 500 miles (800 km)
5. Koyukuk River – 500 miles (800 km)
7. Noatak River – 420 miles (680 km)
8. Porcupine River – 380 miles (610 km)
9. Stikine River – 379 miles (610 km)
10. Colville River – 350 miles (560 km)

The Kuskokwim River is the longest river that is entirely within Alaska. See also List of rivers of Alaska.

== Arizona ==
1. Colorado River – 1,450 miles (2,330 km)
2. Gila River – 650 miles (1,050 km)
3. Little Colorado River – 315 miles (507 km)
4. Salt River – 200 miles (320 km)
5. Santa Cruz River – 184 miles (296 km)
6. Verde River – 170 miles (270 km)
7. Puerco River – 167 miles (269 km)
8. Virgin River – 162 miles (261 km)
9. San Francisco River – 159 miles (256 km)
10. San Pedro River – 140 miles (230 km)

The Little Colorado River is the longest river that is entirely within Arizona. See also List of rivers of Arizona.

== Arkansas ==
1. Mississippi River – 2,320 miles (3,730 km)
2. Arkansas River – 1,469 miles (2,364 km)
3. Red River – 1,360 miles (2,190 km)
4. White River – 722 miles (1,162 km)
5. Ouachita River – 548 miles (882 km)
6. St. Francis River – 426 miles (686 km)
7. Bayou Bartholomew – 364 miles (586 km)
8. Black River – 300 miles (480 km)
9. Little River – 222 miles (357 km)
10. Bayou Macon – 218 miles (351 km)

The Saline River (202 miles (325 km)) is the longest river that is entirely within Arkansas. See also List of rivers of Arkansas.

== California ==
1. Colorado River – 1,450 miles (2,330 km)
2. Sacramento River – 447 miles (719 km)
3. San Joaquin River – 365 miles (587 km)
4. Klamath River – 263 miles (423 km)
5. Pit River – 207 miles (333 km)
6. Eel River – 200 miles (320 km)
7. Amargosa River – 185 miles (298 km)
8. Owens River – 183 miles (295 km)
9. Salinas River – 170 miles (270 km)
10. Trinity River – 165 miles (266 km)

The Sacramento River is the longest river that is entirely within California. See also List of rivers of California.

== Colorado ==
1. Rio Grande – 1,896 miles (3,051 km)
2. Arkansas River – 1,469 miles (2,364 km)
3. Colorado River – 1,450 miles (2,330 km)
4. Canadian River – 906 miles (1,458 km)
5. Green River – 730 miles (1,170 km)
6. North Platte River – 716 miles (1,152 km)
7. Cimarron River – 698 miles (1,123 km)
8. Smoky Hill River – 560 miles (900 km)
9. South Platte River – 439 miles (707 km)
10. San Juan River – 383 miles (616 km)

The Yampa River (250 miles (400 km)) is the longest river that is entirely within Colorado. See also List of rivers of Colorado.

== Connecticut ==
1. Connecticut River – 407 miles (655 km)
2. Housatonic River – 149 miles (240 km)
3. Quinebaug River – 69 miles (111 km)
4. Farmington River – 47 miles (76 km)
5. Quinnipiac River – 46 miles (74 km)
6. Scantic River – 41 miles (66 km)
7. Naugatuck River – 40 miles (64 km)
8. Pawcatuck River – 34 miles (55 km)
9. Shepaug River – 26 miles (42 km)
10. Still River – 25.4 miles (40.9 km)

The Farmington River is the longest river that is entirely within Connecticut. See also List of rivers of Connecticut.

== Delaware ==
1. Delaware River – 301 miles (484 km)
2. Choptank River – 71 miles (114 km)
3. Pocomoke River – 66 miles (106 km)
4. Nanticoke River – 64 miles (103 km)
5. Marshyhope Creek – 37 miles (60 km)
6. Christina River – 35 miles (56 km)
7. Sassafras River – 22 miles (35 km)
7. Murderkill River – 22 miles (35 km)
9. Brandywine Creek – 20 miles (32 km)
10. White Clay Creek – 19 miles (31 km)

The Murderkill River is the longest river that is entirely within Delaware. See also List of rivers of Delaware.

== Florida ==
1. Chattahoochee River/Apalachicola River – 430 miles (690 km)
2. St. Johns River – 310 miles (500 km)
3. Suwannee River – 246 miles (396 km)
4. Ochlockonee River – 206 miles (332 km)
5. Alapaha River – 202 miles (325 km)
6. Conecuh River – 198 miles (319 km)
7. Pea River – 154 miles (248 km)
8. Indian River – 153 miles (246 km)
9. Choctawhatchee River – 141 miles (227 km)
9. Withlacoochee River (central Florida) – 141 miles (227 km)

The St. Johns River is the longest river that is entirely within Florida. See also List of rivers of Florida.

== Georgia ==
1. Chattahoochee River – 430 miles (690 km)
2. Flint River – 344 miles (554 km)
3. Savannah River – 301 miles (484 km)
4. Ogeechee River – 294 miles (473 km)
5. Coosa River – 280 miles (450 km)
6. Tallapoosa River – 265 miles (426 km)
7. Ocmulgee River – 255 miles (410 km)
8. Suwannee River – 246 miles (396 km)
9. Satilla River – 235 miles (378 km)
10. Oconee River – 221 miles (356 km)

The Flint River is the longest river that is entirely within Georgia. See also List of rivers of Georgia (U.S. state).

== Hawaii ==
1. Wailuku River – 28.0 miles (45.1 km)
2. South Fork Kaukonahua Stream – 18.1 miles (29.1 km)
3. North Fork Kaukonahua Stream – 16.3 miles (26.2 km)
4. Hanalei River – 15.7 miles (25.3 km)
5. Kolekole Stream – 12.4 miles (20.0 km)
6. North Fork Wailua River – 12.2 miles (19.6 km)
7. Waimea River – 12.1 miles (19.5 km)
8. Kaukonahua Stream – 9.9 miles (15.9 km)
9. Anahulu River – 7.1 miles (11.4 km)

All of Hawaii's rivers and streams are entirely within the boundaries of the state. See also List of rivers of Hawaii.

== Idaho ==
1. Snake River – 1,078 miles (1,735 km)
2. Kootenai River – 485 miles (781 km)
3. Salmon River – 425 miles (684 km)
4. Bear River – 350 miles (560 km)
5. Owyhee River – 346 miles (557 km)
6. Clark Fork – 310 miles (500 km)
7. Palouse River – 167 miles (269 km)
8. Bruneau River – 153 miles (246 km)
9. Big Wood River – 137 miles (220 km)
10. Blackfoot River – 136 miles (219 km)

The Salmon River is the longest river that is entirely within Idaho. See also List of rivers of Idaho and List of longest streams of Idaho.

== Illinois ==
1. Mississippi River – 2,320 miles (3,730 km)
2. Ohio River – 981 miles (1,579 km)
3. Wabash River – 503 miles (810 km)
4. Illinois River – 332 miles (534 km)
5. Rock River – 299 miles (481 km)
6. Kaskaskia River – 292 miles (470 km)
7. Sangamon River – 246 miles (396 km)
8. Little Wabash River – 240 miles (390 km)
9. Fox River – 199 miles (320 km)
10. Embarras River – 195 miles (314 km)

The Illinois River is the longest river that is entirely within Illinois. See also List of rivers of Illinois.

== Indiana ==
1. Ohio River – 981 miles (1,579 km)
2. Wabash River – 503 miles (810 km)
3. White River – 362 miles (583 km)
4. St. Joseph River – 206 miles (332 km)
5. East Fork White River – 192 miles (309 km)
6. Tippecanoe River – 182 miles (293 km)
7. Patoka River – 167 miles (269 km)
8. Great Miami River – 160 miles (260 km)
9. Maumee River – 137 miles (220 km)
10. Kankakee River – 133 miles (214 km)

The White River is the longest river that is entirely within Indiana. See also List of rivers of Indiana.

== Iowa ==
1. Missouri River – 2,340 miles (3,770 km)
2. Mississippi River – 2,320 miles (3,730 km)
3. Des Moines River – 525 miles (845 km)
4. Big Sioux River – 419 miles (674 km)
5. Cedar River – 338 miles (544 km)
6. Iowa River – 323 miles (520 km)
7. Wapsipinicon River – 300 miles (480 km)
8. Little Sioux River – 258 miles (415 km)
9. Grand River – 226 miles (364 km)
10. Chariton River – 218 miles (351 km)

The Iowa River is the longest river that is entirely within Iowa. See also List of rivers of Iowa.

== Kansas ==
1. Missouri River – 2,340 miles (3,770 km)
2. Arkansas River – 1,469 miles (2,364 km)
3. Cimarron River – 698 miles (1,123 km)
4. Smoky Hill River – 560 miles (900 km)
5. Neosho River – 463 miles (745 km)
6. Republican River – 453 miles (729 km)
7. Saline River – 397 miles (639 km)
8. Big Blue River – 359 miles (578 km)
9. Verdigris River – 310 miles (500 km)
10. South Fork Solomon River – 292 miles (470 km)

The Saline River is the longest river that is entirely within Kansas. See also List of rivers of Kansas.

== Kentucky ==
1. Mississippi River – 2,320 miles (3,730 km)
2. Ohio River – 981 miles (1,579 km)
3. Cumberland River – 688 miles (1,107 km)
4. Tennessee River – 652 miles (1,049 km)
5. Green River – 384 miles (618 km)
6. Licking River – 303 miles (488 km)
7. Kentucky River – 260 miles (420 km)
8. North Fork Kentucky River – 168 miles (270 km)
9. Levisa Fork – 164 miles (264 km)
10. Tug Fork – 159 miles (256 km)

The Green River is the longest river that is entirely within Kentucky. See also List of rivers of Kentucky.

== Louisiana ==
1. Mississippi River – 2,320 miles (3,730 km)
2. Red River – 1,360 miles (2,190 km)
3. Ouachita River – 548 miles (882 km)
4. Sabine River – 510 miles (820 km)
5. Pearl River – 444 miles (715 km)
6. Bayou Bartholomew – 364 miles (586 km)
7. Bayou Macon – 218 miles (351 km)
8. Boeuf River – 216 miles (348 km)
9. Calcasieu River – 200 miles (320 km)
10. Tensas River – 177 miles (285 km)

The Calcasieu River is the longest river that is entirely within Louisiana. See also List of rivers of Louisiana.

== Maine ==
1. Saint John River – 418 miles (673 km)
2. Androscoggin River – 178 miles (286 km)
3. Kennebec River – 170 miles (270 km)
4. Saco River – 136 miles (219 km)
5. West Branch Penobscot River – 117 miles (188 km)
6. Aroostook River – 112 miles (180 km)
7. Penobscot River – 109 miles (175 km)
8. Moose River – 83 miles (134 km)
9. East Branch Penobscot River – 75 miles (121 km)
10. Saint Francis River – 75 miles (121 km)

The Kennebec River is the longest river that is entirely within Maine. See also List of rivers of Maine.

== Maryland ==
1. Susquehanna River – 444 miles (715 km)
2. Potomac River – 302 miles (486 km)
3. Youghiogheny River – 134 miles (216 km)
4. Patuxent River – 115 miles (185 km)
5. North Branch Potomac River – 103 miles (166 km)
6. Conococheague Creek – 80 miles (130 km)
7. Choptank River – 71 miles (114 km)
8. Pocomoke River – 66 miles (106 km)
9. Nanticoke River – 64 miles (103 km)
10. Monocacy River – 58 miles (93 km)

The Patuxent River is the longest river that is entirely within Maryland. See also List of rivers of Maryland.

== Massachusetts ==
1. Connecticut River – 407 miles (655 km)
2. Housatonic River – 149 miles (240 km)
3. Merrimack River – 117 miles (188 km)
4. Charles River – 80 miles (130 km)
5. Deerfield River – 76 miles (122 km)
5. Hoosic River – 76 miles (122 km)
7. Quinebaug River – 69 miles (111 km)
8. Westfield River – 61 miles (98 km)
9. Millers River – 52 miles (84 km)
10. Blackstone River – 48 miles (77 km)

The Charles River is the longest river that is entirely within Massachusetts. See also List of rivers of Massachusetts.

== Michigan ==
1. Grand River – 252 miles (406 km)
2. Muskegon River – 216 miles (348 km)
3. St. Joseph River – 206 miles (332 km)
4. Manistee River – 190 miles (310 km)
5. River Raisin – 139 miles (224 km)
6. Au Sable River – 138 miles (222 km)
7. Huron River – 130 miles (210 km)
7. Kalamazoo River – 130 miles (210 km)
9. Shiawassee River – 120 miles (190 km)
10. Menominee River – 116 miles (187 km)

The Grand River is the longest river that is entirely within Michigan. See also List of rivers of Michigan.

== Minnesota ==
1. Mississippi River – 2,320 miles (3,730 km)
2. Red River of the North – 550 miles (890 km)
3. Des Moines River – 525 miles (845 km)
4. Minnesota River – 370 miles (600 km)
5. Cedar River – 338 miles (544 km)
6. Wapsipinicon River – 300 miles (480 km)
7. Little Sioux River – 258 miles (415 km)
8. Roseau River – 214 miles (344 km)
9. Red Lake River – 193 miles (311 km)
10. Otter Tail River – 192 miles (309 km)
10. Saint Louis River – 192 miles (309 km)

The Minnesota River is the longest river that is entirely within Minnesota. See also List of rivers of Minnesota and List of longest streams of Minnesota.

== Mississippi ==
1. Mississippi River – 2,320 miles (3,730 km)
2. Tennessee River – 652 miles (1,049 km)
3. Pearl River – 444 miles (715 km)
4. Big Black River – 330 miles (530 km)
5. Hatchie River – 238 miles (383 km)
6. Chickasawhay River – 210 miles (340 km)
7. Tombigbee River – 200 miles (320 km)
8. Yazoo River – 188 miles (303 km)
9. Leaf River – 180 miles (290 km)
10. Yalobusha River – 165 miles (266 km)

The Pearl River is the longest river that is entirely within Mississippi. See also List of rivers of Mississippi.

== Missouri ==
1. Missouri River – 2,340 miles (3,770 km)
2. Mississippi River – 2,320 miles (3,730 km)
3. White River – 722 miles (1,162 km)
4. Des Moines River – 525 miles (845 km)
5. St. Francis River – 426 miles (686 km)
6. Black River – 300 miles (480 km)
7. Gasconade River – 280 miles (450 km)
8. Osage River – 276 miles (444 km)
9. Meramec River – 229 miles (369 km)
10. Chariton River – 218 miles (351 km)

The Gasconade River is the longest river that is entirely within Missouri. See also List of rivers of Missouri.

== Montana ==
1. Missouri River – 2,340 miles (3,770 km)
2. Milk River – 729 miles (1,173 km)
3. Yellowstone River – 692 miles (1,114 km)
4. Kootenai River – 485 miles (781 km)
5. Bighorn River – 461 miles (742 km)
6. Powder River – 375 miles (604 km)
7. Musselshell River – 342 miles (550 km)
8. Clark Fork – 310 miles (500 km)
9. Tongue River – 265 miles (426 km)
10. Frenchman River – 212 miles (341 km)

The Musselshell River is the longest river that is entirely within Montana. See also List of rivers of Montana.

== Nebraska ==
1. Missouri River – 2,340 miles (3,770 km)
2. North Platte River – 716 miles (1,152 km)
3. White River – 580 miles (930 km)
4. Niobrara River – 568 miles (914 km)
5. Republican River – 453 miles (729 km)
6. South Platte River – 439 miles (707 km)
7. Big Blue River – 359 miles (578 km)
8. Platte River – 310 miles (500 km)
9. Elkhorn River – 290 miles (470 km)

The Platte River is the longest river that is entirely within Nebraska. See also List of rivers of Nebraska.

== Nevada ==
1. Colorado River – 1,450 miles (2,330 km)
2. Owyhee River – 346 miles (557 km)
3. Humboldt River – 330 miles (530 km)
4. Amargosa River – 185 miles (298 km)
5. Reese River – 181 miles (291 km)
6. Virgin River – 162 miles (261 km)
7. Bruneau River – 153 miles (246 km)
8. White River – 138 miles (222 km)
9. Carson River – 131 miles (211 km)
10. Salmon Falls Creek – 121 miles (195 km)

The Humboldt River is the longest river that is entirely within Nevada. See also List of rivers of Nevada.

== New Hampshire ==
1. Connecticut River – 407 miles (655 km)
2. Androscoggin River – 178 miles (286 km)
3. Saco River – 136 miles (219 km)
4. Merrimack River – 117 miles (188 km)
5. Contoocook River – 71 miles (114 km)
6. Pemigewasset River – 65 miles (105 km)
7. Ashuelot River – 64 miles (103 km)
8. Ammonoosuc River – 55 miles (89 km)
9. Lamprey River – 50 miles (80 km)
10. Magalloway River – 47 miles (76 km)

The Contoocook River is the longest river that is entirely within New Hampshire. See also List of rivers of New Hampshire.

== New Jersey ==
1. Hudson River – 315 miles (507 km)
2. Delaware River – 301 miles (484 km)
3. Raritan River (including the length of the South Branch) – 121 miles (195 km)
4. Wallkill River – 88 miles (142 km)
5. Passaic River – 80 miles (130 km)
6. Great Egg Harbor River – 55 miles (89 km)
7. Mullica River – 51 miles (82 km)
7. South Branch Raritan River – 51 miles (82 km)
9. Musconetcong River – 46 miles (74 km)
10. Hackensack River – 45 miles (72 km)

The Raritan River is the longest river that is entirely within New Jersey. See also List of rivers of New Jersey.

== New Mexico ==
1. Rio Grande – 1,896 miles (3,051 km)
2. Pecos River – 926 miles (1,490 km)
3. Canadian River – 906 miles (1,458 km)
4. Cimarron River – 698 miles (1,123 km)
5. Gila River – 650 miles (1,050 km)
6. San Juan River – 383 miles (616 km)
7. Rio Puerco – 230 miles (370 km)
8. Puerco River – 167 miles (269 km)
9. San Francisco River – 159 miles (256 km)
10. Carrizo Creek – 145 miles (233 km)

The Rio Puerco is the longest river that is entirely within New Mexico. See also List of rivers of New Mexico.

== New York ==
1. Saint Lawrence River – 744 miles (1,197 km)
2. Susquehanna River – 464 miles (747 km)
3. Allegheny River – 325 miles (523 km)
4. Hudson River – 315 miles (507 km)
5. Delaware River – 301 miles (484 km)
6. Genesee River – 157 miles (253 km)
7. Mohawk River – 149 miles (240 km)
8. Raquette River – 146 miles (235 km)
9. Oswegatchie River – 137 miles (220 km)
10. Black River – 125 miles (201 km)

The Hudson River is the longest river that is entirely within New York State. See also List of rivers of New York.

== North Carolina ==
1. Roanoke River – 410 miles (660 km)
2. New River – 320 miles (510 km)
3. Neuse River – 275 miles (443 km)
4. Pee Dee River – 232 miles (373 km)
5. Catawba River – 220 miles (350 km)
6. Tar River – 215 miles (346 km)
6. Yadkin River – 215 miles (346 km)
8. Dan River – 214 miles (344 km)
9. French Broad River – 213 miles (343 km)
10. Cape Fear River – 202 miles (325 km)

The Neuse River is the longest river that is entirely within North Carolina. See also List of rivers of North Carolina.

== North Dakota ==
1. Missouri River – 2,340 miles (3,770 km)
2. James River – 710 miles (1,140 km)
3. Yellowstone River – 692 miles (1,114 km)
4. Sheyenne River – 591 miles (951 km)
5. Little Missouri River – 560 miles (900 km)
6. Red River of the North – 550 miles (890 km)
7. Souris River – 435 miles (700 km)
8. Pembina River – 319 miles (513 km)
9. Wild Rice River – 251 miles (404 km)
10. Maple River – 198 miles (319 km)

The Sheyenne River is the longest river that is entirely within North Dakota. See also List of rivers of North Dakota.

== Ohio ==
1. Ohio River – 981 miles (1,579 km)
2. Wabash River – 503 miles (810 km)
3. Scioto River – 231 miles (372 km)
4. Great Miami River – 160 miles (260 km)
5. Maumee River – 137 miles (220 km)
6. Sandusky River – 133 miles (214 km)
7. Tuscarawas River – 130 miles (210 km)
8. Raccoon Creek – 114 miles (183 km)
9. Auglaize River – 113 miles (182 km)
9. Mahoning River – 113 miles (182 km)

The Scioto River is the longest river that is entirely within Ohio. See also List of rivers of Ohio.

== Oklahoma ==
1. Arkansas River – 1,469 miles (2,364 km)
2. Red River – 1,360 miles (2,190 km)
3. Canadian River – 906 miles (1,458 km)
4. Cimarron River – 698 miles (1,123 km)
5. Neosho River – 463 miles (745 km)
6. North Canadian River – 440 miles (710 km)
7. Verdigris River – 310 miles (500 km)
8. Washita River – 295 miles (475 km)
9. North Fork Red River – 271 miles (436 km)
10. Salt Fork Arkansas River – 239 miles (385 km)

The North Canadian River is the longest river that is entirely within Oklahoma. See also List of rivers of Oklahoma.

== Oregon ==
1. Columbia River – 1,243 miles (2,000 km)
2. Snake River – 1,078 miles (1,735 km)
3. Owyhee River – 346 miles (557 km)
4. John Day River – 281 miles (452 km)
5. Klamath River – 263 miles (423 km)
6. Deschutes River – 252 miles (406 km)
7. Rogue River – 215 miles (346 km)
8. Malheur River – 190 miles (310 km)
9. Willamette River – 187 miles (301 km)
10. Grande Ronde River – 182 miles (293 km)

The John Day River is the longest river that is entirely within Oregon. See also List of rivers of Oregon and List of longest streams of Oregon.

== Pennsylvania ==
1. Ohio River – 981 miles (1,579 km)
2. Susquehanna River – 464 miles (747 km)
3. Allegheny River – 325 miles (523 km)
4. Delaware River – 301 miles (484 km)
5. West Branch Susquehanna River – 243 miles (391 km)
6. Genesee River – 157 miles (253 km)
7. Schuylkill River – 135 miles (217 km)
8. Youghiogheny River – 134 miles (216 km)
9. Monongahela River – 130 miles (210 km)
10. Raystown Branch Juniata River – 123 miles (198 km)

The West Branch Susquehanna River is the longest river that is entirely within Pennsylvania. See also List of rivers of Pennsylvania.

== Rhode Island ==
1. Blackstone River – 48 miles (77 km)
2. Pawcatuck River – 34 miles (55 km)
3. Wood River – 25 miles (40 km)
4. Moosup River – 24 miles (39 km)
5. Ten Mile River – 22 miles (35 km)
6. Mill River – 17 miles (27 km)
7. Woonasquatucket River – 16 miles (26 km)
8. Sakonnet River – 14 miles (23 km)
9. Ponaganset River – 12.5 miles (20.1 km)
10. Pawtuxet River – 12.3 miles (19.8 km)

The Woonasquatucket River is the longest river that is entirely within Rhode Island. See also List of rivers of Rhode Island.

== South Carolina ==
1. Savannah River – 301 miles (484 km)
2. Pee Dee River – 232 miles (373 km)
3. Catawba River – 220 miles (350 km)
4. Edisto River – 206 miles (332 km)
5. Saluda River – 200 miles (320 km)
6. Black River – 151 miles (243 km)
7. Broad River – 150 miles (240 km)
8. Santee River – 143 miles (230 km)
9. Lynches River – 140 miles (230 km)
10. Lumber River – 133 miles (214 km)

The Edisto River is the longest river that is entirely within South Carolina. See also List of rivers of South Carolina.

== South Dakota ==
1. Missouri River – 2,340 miles (3,770 km)
2. James River – 710 miles (1,140 km)
3. White River – 580 miles (930 km)
4. Little Missouri River – 560 miles (900 km)
5. Big Sioux River – 419 miles (674 km)
6. Cheyenne River – 295 miles (475 km)
7. Moreau River – 291 miles (468 km)
8. Belle Fourche River – 290 miles (470 km)
9. Little White River – 234 miles (377 km)
10. Bad River – 161 miles (259 km)

The Moreau River is the longest river that is entirely within South Dakota. See also List of rivers of South Dakota.

== Tennessee ==
1. Mississippi River – 2,320 miles (3,730 km)
2. Cumberland River – 688 miles (1,107 km)
3. Tennessee River – 652 miles (1,049 km)
4. Clinch River – 300 miles (480 km)
5. Duck River – 284 miles (457 km)
6. Hatchie River – 238 miles (383 km)
7. French Broad River – 213 miles (343 km)
8. Elk River – 195 miles (314 km)
9. Hiwassee River – 147 miles (237 km)
10. Caney Fork – 143 miles (230 km)

The Duck River is the longest river that is entirely within Tennessee. See also List of rivers of Tennessee.

== Texas ==
1. Rio Grande – 1,896 miles (3,051 km)
2. Red River – 1,360 miles (2,190 km)
3. Pecos River – 926 miles (1,490 km)
4. Canadian River – 906 miles (1,458 km)
5. Colorado River – 862 miles (1,387 km)
6. Brazos River – 840 miles (1,350 km)
7. Trinity River – 710 miles (1,140 km)
8. Sabine River – 510 miles (820 km)
9. Neches River – 416 miles (669 km)
10. Nueces River – 315 miles (507 km)

The Colorado River is the longest river that is entirely within Texas. See also List of rivers of Texas.

== Utah ==
1. Colorado River – 1,450 miles (2,330 km)
2. Green River – 730 miles (1,170 km)
3. San Juan River – 383 miles (616 km)
3. Sevier River – 383 miles (616 km)
5. Bear River – 350 miles (560 km)
6. Dolores River – 250 miles (400 km)
7. Blacks Fork – 175 miles (282 km)
8. Virgin River – 162 miles (261 km)
9. White River – 160 miles (260 km)
10. Price River – 137 miles (220 km)

The Sevier River is the longest river that is entirely within Utah. See also List of rivers of Utah.

== Vermont ==
1. Connecticut River – 407 miles (655 km)
2. Otter Creek – 112 miles (180 km)
3. Winooski River – 90 miles (140 km)
4. Lamoille River – 85 miles (137 km)
5. Missisquoi River – 80 miles (130 km)
6. Deerfield River – 76 miles (122 km)
6. Hoosic River – 76 miles (122 km)
8. White River – 60 miles (97 km)
9. Batten Kill – 59 miles (95 km)
10. West River – 54 miles (87 km)

Otter Creek is the longest river that is entirely within Vermont. See also List of rivers of Vermont.

== Virginia ==
1. Roanoke River – 410 miles (660 km)
2. James River – 348 miles (560 km)
3. New River – 320 miles (510 km)
4. Potomac River – 302 miles (486 km)
5. Clinch River – 300 miles (480 km)
6. Dan River – 214 miles (344 km)
7. Rappahannock River – 195 miles (314 km)
8. Levisa Fork – 164 miles (264 km)
9. Tug Fork – 159 miles (256 km)
10. Appomattox River – 157 miles (253 km)

The James River is the longest river that is entirely within Virginia. See also List of rivers of Virginia.

== Washington ==
1. Columbia River – 1,243 miles (2,000 km)
2. Snake River – 1,078 miles (1,735 km)
3. Yakima River – 214 miles (344 km)
4. Grande Ronde River – 182 miles (293 km)
5. Kettle River – 175 miles (282 km)
6. Palouse River – 167 miles (269 km)
7. Crab Creek – 163 miles (262 km)
8. Skagit River – 150 miles (240 km)
9. Pend Oreille River – 130 miles (210 km)
10. Similkameen River – 122 miles (196 km)

The Yakima River is the longest river that is entirely within Washington state. See also List of rivers of Washington (state).

== West Virginia ==
1. Ohio River – 981 miles (1,579 km)
2. New River – 320 miles (510 km)
3. Potomac River – 302 miles (486 km)
4. Greenbrier River – 173 miles (278 km)
5. Elk River – 172 miles (277 km)
6. Little Kanawha River – 169 miles (272 km)
7. Guyandotte River – 166 miles (267 km)
8. Tug Fork – 159 miles (256 km)
9. South Branch Potomac River – 139 miles (224 km)
10. Tygart Valley River – 135 miles (217 km)

The Greenbrier River is the longest river that is entirely within West Virginia. See also List of rivers of West Virginia.

== Wisconsin ==
1. Mississippi River – 2,320 miles (3,730 km)
2. Wisconsin River – 430 miles (690 km)
3. Rock River – 299 miles (481 km)
4. Wolf River – 225 miles (362 km)
5. Oconto River – 209 miles (336 km)
6. Fox River (Green Bay tributary) – 200 miles (322 km)
7. Fox River (Illinois River tributary) – 199 miles (320 km)
8. Pecatonica River – 194 miles (312 km)
9. Saint Louis River – 192 miles (309 km)
10. Chippewa River – 191 miles (307 km)

The Wisconsin River is the longest river that is entirely within Wisconsin, though its source is a lake that is partially in the Upper Peninsula of Michigan. See also List of rivers of Wisconsin.

== Wyoming ==
1. Snake River – 1,078 miles (1,735 km)
2. Green River – 730 miles (1,170 km)
3. North Platte River – 716 miles (1,152 km)
4. Yellowstone River – 692 miles (1,114 km)
5. Niobrara River – 568 miles (914 km)
6. Little Missouri River – 560 miles (900 km)
7. Wind River/Bighorn River – 461 miles (742 km)
8. Powder River – 375 miles (604 km)
9. Bear River – 350 miles (560 km)
10. Cheyenne River – 295 miles (475 km)

The Wind River is the longest river that is entirely within Wyoming (its name changes to the Bighorn River at the Wedding of the Waters, on the north side of the Wind River Canyon). See also List of rivers of Wyoming.

== See also ==
- List of longest rivers of the United States (by main stem)
- List of rivers of the United States by discharge
