= List of rivers of Hawaii =

Hawaii's location on a map

This is a list of rivers and streams in Hawaii (U.S. state).

Modern maps show some 360 streams in the Hawaiian Islands. However, because of the small size of the islands in comparison with continental areas, there are very few navigable rivers anywhere in the islands.

The following list is sorted by name. Click on the double triangles at the top of the "Island" column to sort the table by island.

Name	Island	Length	Additional information
'Ohe'o Gulch Stream	Oʻahu		
Ala Wai Canal	Oahu		
Anahulu River	Oahu	7.1 miles (11.4 km) long.	
Halawa Stream	Molokai		
Hanakapiai Stream	Kauai		
Hanakoa Stream	Kauai		
Hanalei River	Kauai	26.5 km (16.5 mi)	
Hanapēpē River	Kauai	24.2 km (15.0 mi)	Includes the Kō'ula River watershed.
Hanawi Stream	Maui		
Honolewa Stream	Hawaiʻi		
Honolii Stream	Hawaiʻi		
Honomu Stream	Hawaiʻi		
Hule’ia River	Kauai		
Kahakuloa Stream	Maui		
Kaukonahua Stream	Oahu	28 miles (45 km) (including South Fork)	One of the longest in the state
Kahana Stream	Oahu		
Kihalani Stream	Hawaii		
Kaiwilahilahi Stream	Hawaii		
Kalalau Stream	Kauai		
Kalihiwai River	Kauai		
Kaluanui Stream	Oahu		
Kapehu Stream	Hawaiʻi		
Kapia Stream	Maui		
Kawainui Stream	Molokai		
Koaie Stream	Kauai		
Kolekole Stream	Hawaiʻi	12.4 miles (20.0 km)	Includes Akaka Falls.
Koloa Gulch	Oahu		
Limahuli Stream	Kauai		
Lumaha'i River	Kauai	9.9 mi (15.9 km)	
Manoloa Stream	Hawaiʻi		
Ninole Stream	Hawaiʻi		
Nualolo Aina Stream	Kauai		
Opea Stream	Hawaiʻi		
Paheehee Stream	Maui		
Paukauila Stream	Oahu		
Pelekunu Stream	Molokai		
Waialae Stream	Hawaiʻi		
Waihee River	Maui		
Waikolu Stream	Molokai		
Wailau River	Molokai		
Wailuā River	Kauai	14.5 mi (23.3 km)	
Wailuku River	Hawaiʻi	28 mi (45 km)	One of the longest in the state. Largest stream discharge in the state.
Waimanu Stream	Hawaiʻi		
Waimea River	Kauaʻi	22.2 mi (35.7 km)	One of the longest on Kauai
Waimea River	Oahu	15.2 mi (24.5 km)	

== See also ==
- List of rivers in the United States
