= Waialae =

Waialae or Waiʻalae may refer to:

- Waialae Country Club, a private country club in Honolulu, Hawaii
- Waialae, Hawaii, a section of Honolulu, Hawaii alongside Kāhala
- Waialae Stream, a small river on Hawaii
