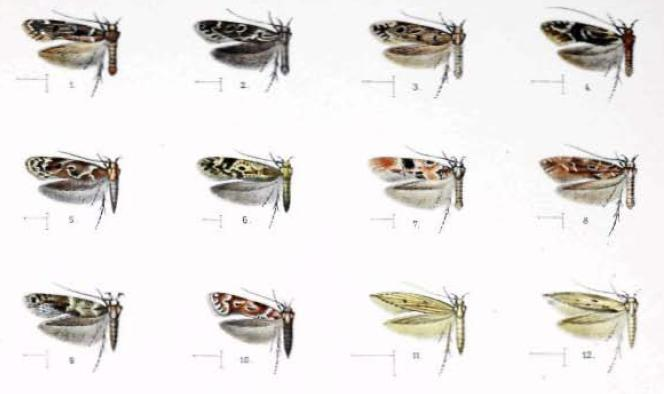
- Illustrations in Fauna Hawaiiensis: 1. Hyposmocoma subscolopax, 2. Hyposmocoma tetraonella, 3. Hyposmocoma somatodes, 4. Hyposmocoma belophora, 5. Hyposmocoma turdella, 6. Hyposmocoma subcitrella, 7. Hyposmocoma inflexa, 8. Hyposmocoma brevistrigata, 9. Hyposmocoma discolor, 10. Hyposmocoma fuscotogata, 11. Hyposmocoma radiatella and 12. Hyposmocoma barbata

Scientific classification
- Domain: Eukaryota
- Kingdom: Animalia
- Phylum: Arthropoda
- Class: Insecta
- Order: Lepidoptera
- Family: Cosmopterigidae
- Genus: Hyposmocoma
- Species: H. belophora

Binomial name
- Hyposmocoma belophora Walsingham, 1907

= Hyposmocoma belophora =

Species of moth

Hyposmocoma belophora is a species of moth of the family Cosmopterigidae, endemic to the Hawaiian island of Oahu. It was first described by Lord Walsingham in 1907. The type locality is near the head of Kawailoa Gulch.
