= Waimea River =

Waimea River may refer to:

== Hawaii ==
- Waimea River (Kauaʻi) on the island of Kauai
- Waimea River (Oʻahu) on the island of Oahu

== New Zealand ==
- Waimea River (Southland) in the south of the South Island
- Waimea River (Tasman) in the north of the South Island
