= Kihalani Stream =

Stream in Hawaii, USA

Kihalani Stream Tributary to Pacific Ocean
- Location of Kihalani Stream mouth Kihalani Stream (Pacific Ocean)

Location
- Country: United States
- State: Hawaii
- County: Hawaii

Physical characteristics
- Source: Kaiwilahilah Stream divide
  - location: about 2 miles southwest of Pāpaʻaloa, Hawaii
  - coordinates: 19°57′17.77″N 155°14′35.79″W
  - elevation: 1,630 ft (500 m)
- Mouth: Pacific Ocean
  - location: about 0.5 northwest of Pāpaʻaloa, Hawaii
  - coordinates: 19°58′45.78″N 155°13′20.34″W
  - elevation: 0 ft (0 m)
- Length: 2.28 mi (3.67 km)
- Basin size: 0.74 square miles (1.9 km^{2})
- Discharge
  - location: Pacific Ocean
  - average: 3.12 cu ft/s (0.088 m^{3}/s) at mouth with Pacific Ocean

Basin features
- Progression: Pacific Ocean
- River system: Kihalani Stream
- Tributaries
  - left: unnamed tributaries
  - right: unnamed tributaries
- Bridges: Kihalani Homestead Road, HI 19

Kihalani Stream is a 2.28 mi (3.67 km) long first-order tributary to the Pacific Ocean in Hawaii County, Hawaii.

== Course ==
Kihalani Stream rises on the Kaiwilahilah Stream divide about 2 miles southwest of Pāpaʻaloa, Hawaii, and then flows northeast to join the Pacific Ocean about 0.5 miles northwest of Pāpaʻaloa, Hawaii.

== Watershed ==
Kihalani Stream drains 0.74 square miles (1.9 km^{2}) of area.

== See also ==
- List of rivers of Hawaii
