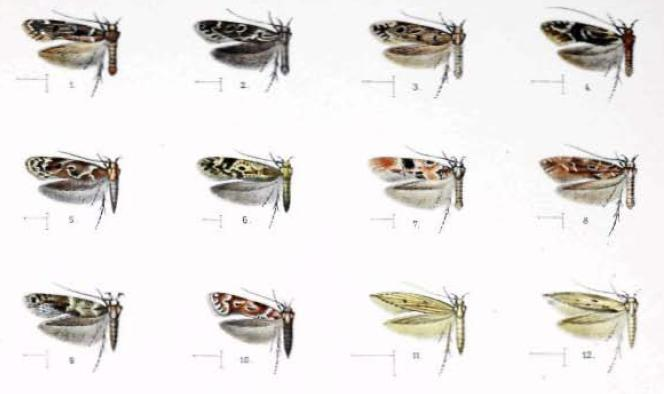
- Illustrations in Fauna Hawaiiensis: 1. Hyposmocoma subscolopax, 2. Hyposmocoma tetraonella, 3. Hyposmocoma somatodes, 4. Hyposmocoma belophora, 5. Hyposmocoma turdella, 6. Hyposmocoma subcitrella, 7. Hyposmocoma inflexa, 8. Hyposmocoma brevistrigata, 9. Hyposmocoma discolor, 10. Hyposmocoma fuscotogata, 11. Hyposmocoma radiatella and 12. Hyposmocoma barbata

Scientific classification
- Domain: Eukaryota
- Kingdom: Animalia
- Phylum: Arthropoda
- Class: Insecta
- Order: Lepidoptera
- Family: Cosmopterigidae
- Genus: Hyposmocoma
- Species: H. subscolopax

Binomial name
- Hyposmocoma subscolopax Walsingham, 1907

= Hyposmocoma subscolopax =

Species of moth

Hyposmocoma subscolopax is a species of moth of the family Cosmopterigidae. It was first described by Lord Walsingham in 1907. It is endemic to the island of Hawaii. The type locality is Kīlauea.
