= List of longest rivers of the United States =

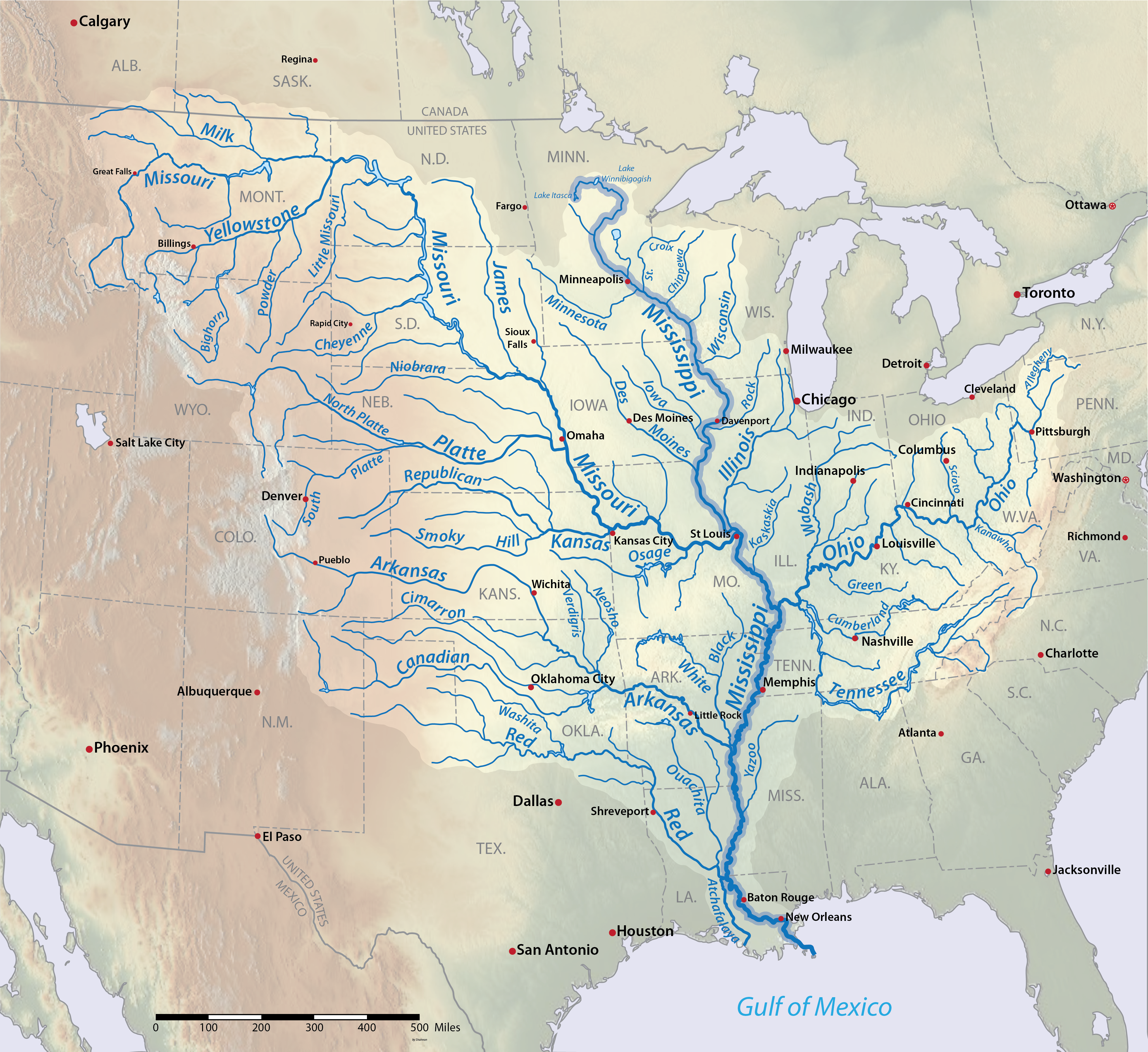
The Mississippi drainage basin includes the Missouri and the Mississippi rivers, the two longest main-stem rivers in the United States, as well as 18 more of the rivers on this list. The Mississippi main stem is highlighted in dark blue.

The longest rivers of the United States include 38 that have main stems of at least 500 miles (800 km) long. The main stem is "the primary downstream segment of a river, as contrasted to its tributaries". The United States Geological Survey (USGS) defines a main-stem segment by listing coordinates for its two end points, called the source and the mouth. Some well-known rivers like the Connecticut River, Housatonic River, Atchafalaya, Willamette, and Susquehanna are not included in this list because their main stems are shorter than 500 miles.

Seven rivers in this list cross or form international boundaries. Three—the Milk River, the Red River of the North, and the Saint Lawrence River—begin in the United States and flow into Canada; two do the opposite (Yukon and Columbia). Also a segment of the Saint Lawrence River forms the international border between part of the province of Ontario, Canada, and the U.S. state of New York. Of these seven rivers, only the Milk River crosses the international border twice, leaving and then re-entering the United States. Two rivers, the Colorado and the Rio Grande, begin in the United States and flow into or form a border with Mexico. In addition, the drainage basins of the Mississippi and Missouri rivers extend into Canada, and the basin of the Gila River extends into Mexico.

Sources report hydrological quantities with varied precision. Biologist and author Ruth Patrick, describing a table of high-discharge U.S. rivers, wrote that data on discharge, drainage area, and length varied widely among authors whose works she consulted. "It seems," she said, "that the wisest course is to regard data tables such as the present one as showing the general ranks of rivers, and not to place too much importance on minor (10–20%) differences in figures."

== Table ==
The primary source for watershed and discharge data in the table below is Rivers of North America. Conflicting data from other sources, if the difference is greater than 10 percent, is reported in the notes. Discharge refers to the flow at the mouth. (Note: Dams, diversions for agriculture, and other human alterations to rivers have greatly affected the discharge of some rivers over time. For example, the virgin discharge of the Colorado River is estimated to have been 20,000 ft^{3}/s (566 m^{3}/s) compared to 1,400 ft^{3}/s (~40 m^{3}/s) in 2005.) In the "States, provinces, and map" column, the superscripts "s" and "m" indicate "source" and "mouth". Non-U.S. states appear in italics. Except in the "States, provinces, and map" column, abbreviations are as follows: "km" for "kilometer", "mi" for "mile", "s" for "second", "m" for "meter", and "ft" for "foot".

Key
† River is not entirely within the United States.
‡ Watershed is not entirely within the United States.

Longest main-stem rivers of the United States
#	Name	Length	States, provinces, and map	Source coordinates	Mouth	Mouth coordinates	Watershed area	Discharge	Photo
1	Missouri River	2,540 mi 4,090 km	Montana^{s}, North Dakota, South Dakota, Nebraska, Iowa, Kansas, Missouri^{m}	45°55′39″N 111°30′29″W	Mississippi River	38°48′49″N 90°07′11″W	529,353 mi^{2} 1,371,017 km^{2} ‡ (Note: Of the total, 10,700 mi^{2} (28,000 km^{2}), about two percent of the basin, is in Canada.)	69,100 ft^{3}/s 1,956 m^{3}/s (Note: Kammerer: 76,200 ft^{3}/s (2,160 m^{3}/s).)	The Missouri River as seen in Montana.
2	Mississippi River	2,340mi 3,766 km (Note: Kammerer: 2,340 mi (3,766 km). The Atlas of Canada: 2,348 mi (3,779 km).)	Minnesota^{s}, Wisconsin, Iowa, Illinois, Missouri, Kentucky, Tennessee, Arkansas, Mississippi, Louisiana^{m}	47°14′22″N 95°12′29″W	Gulf of Mexico	29°09′04″N 89°15′12″W	1,260,000 mi^{2} 3,270,000 km^{2} ‡ (Note: Of the total, 10,700 mi^{2} (27,800 km^{2}), less than one percent of the basin, is in Canada.)	650,000 ft^{3}/s 18,400 m^{3}/s	A small river flows from a lake.
3	Yukon River	1,979 mi 3,190 km † (Note: Of this total, 714 mi (1,149 km) are in Canada. This amounts to about 36 percent of the main-stem length.)	British Columbia^{s}, Yukon Territory, Alaska^{m}	59°35′00″N 133°47′00″W	Bering Sea	62°35′55″N 164°48′00″W	324,000 mi^{2} 839,200 km^{2} ‡ (Note: The Atlas of Canada also lists the total basin size at 324,000 mi^{2} (839,200 km^{2}), split between 125,000 mi^{2} (323,800 km^{2}), about 39 percent, in Canada and 199,000 mi^{2} (515,400 km^{2}), about 61 percent, in the United States.)	224,000 ft^{3}/s 6,340 m^{3}/s	Sunset over a large river flowing through mountains.
4	Rio Grande	1,759 mi 2,830 km † (Note: Kammerer: 1,900 mi (3,100 km). University of Texas (UT): 1,799 mi (2,895 km). The river forms the U.S.–Mexico border for 1,251 miles (2,013 km) (about 70 percent of its main-stem length) from El Paso to the Gulf of Mexico.)	Colorado^{s}, New Mexico, Texas^{m}, Chihuahua, Coahuila, Nuevo León, Tamaulipas^{m}	37°47′52″N 107°32′18″W	Gulf of Mexico	25°57′22″N 97°08′43″W	340,000 mi^{2} 870,000 km^{2} ‡ (Note: Rivers of North America says that of this total only about 170,000 mi^{2} (450,000 km^{2}) of the basin contribute water to the river. The University of Texas (UT) says, "The river collects rain, snowmelt and spring water from an area [of] about 215,338 mi^{2} [557,722 km^{2}] including closed basins." It says that 87,020 mi^{2} (225,380 km^{2}) of the basin (about 48 percent), not counting closed basins, are in Mexico, while 93,821 mi^{2} (242,994 km^{2}) (about 52 percent) are in the United States. Kammerer cites a total basin size of 336,000 mi^{2} (870,000 km^{2}).)	1,300 ft^{3}/s 37 m^{3}/s	A small river winds through mountains under a rainbow.
5	Colorado River	1,450 mi 2,330 km † (Note: According to the Utah Division of Water Resources, 75 mi (121 km) of the river are in Mexico. This amounts to about 5 percent of the main-stem length. Of this, 17 mi (27 km) form the border between Mexico and the United States.)	Colorado^{s}, Utah, Arizona, Nevada, California, Sonora^{m}, Baja California^{m}	40°28′20″N 105°49′34″W	Gulf of California	31°48′57″N 114°48′22″W	248,000 mi^{2} 642,000 km^{2} ‡ (Note: The United Nations Environment Programme cites a total basin size of 246,000 mi^{2} (637,000 km^{2}), split between 2,000 mi^{2} (5,200 km^{2}) (about 1 percent) in Mexico and 244,000 mi^{2} (632,000 km^{2}) (about 99 percent) in the United States.)	1,400 ft^{3}/s 40 m^{3}/s	A large river flows through a deep canyon.
6	Arkansas River	1,443 mi 2,322 km (Note: Derived by subtracting the length of the East Fork Arkansas River of roughly 16 mi (26 km) from Kammerer's total of 1,459 mi (2,348 km).)	Colorado^{s}, Kansas, Oklahoma, Arkansas^{m}	39°15′30″N 106°20′38″W	Mississippi River	33°46′30″N 91°04′15″W	160,200 mi^{2} 414,910 km^{2}	35,500 ft^{3}/s 1,004 m^{3}/s	Arkansas River headwaters in Colorado.
7	Columbia River	1,243 mi 2,000 km † (Note: About 498 mi (801 km) are in Canada. This amounts to about 40 percent of the main-stem length.)	British Columbia^{s}, Washington^{m}, Oregon^{m}	50°13′00″N 115°51′00″W	Pacific Ocean	46°14′39″N 124°03′29″W	279,548 mi^{2} 724,024 km^{2} ‡ (Note: The Atlas of Canada lists the total watershed at 259,200 mi^{2} (671,300 km^{2}), split between 39,700 mi^{2} (102,800 km^{2}) (about 15 percent) in Canada and 219,500 mi^{2} (568,500 km^{2}) (about 85 percent) in the United States. Kammerer's figure for the total watershed is 265,000 mi^{2} (690,000 km^{2}).)	273,000 ft^{3}/s 7,730 m^{3}/s	A large river flows through a wooded gorge.
8	Red River	1,125 mi 1,811 km (Note: This is the combined length, 1,360 mi (2,190 km), of the main stem, Prairie Dog Town Fork Red River, and Tierra Blanca Creek minus the lengths of the latter two, 160 mi (260 km) and 75 mi (121 km). Kammerer gives the length as 1,290 mi (2,080 km).)	Oklahoma^{s}, Texas, Arkansas, Louisiana^{m}	34°34′35″N 99°57′54″W	Atchafalaya and Mississippi rivers	31°01′10″N 91°44′52″W	65,590 mi^{2} 169,890 km^{2} (Note: Kammerer: 93,200 mi^{2}.)	30,100 ft^{3}/s 852 m^{3}/s (Note: Kammerer: 56,000 ft^{3}/s (1,600 m^{3}))	Oxbow bend in a river seen from an airplane.
9	Snake River	1,040 mi 1,674 km	Wyoming^{s}, Idaho, Oregon, Washington^{m}	44°07′49″N 110°13′10″W	Columbia River	46°11′10″N 119°01′43″W	108,000 mi^{2} 281,000 km^{2}	55,300 ft^{3}/s 1,565 m^{3}/s	A river winds across a plain at the foot of jagged snow-covered mountains.
10	Ohio River	979 mi 1,575 km	Pennsylvania^{s}, Ohio, West Virginia, Indiana, Illinois, Kentucky^{m}	40°26′34″N 80°01′02″W	Mississippi River	36°59′12″N 89°07′50″W	204,000 mi^{2} 529,000 km^{2}	308,400 ft^{3}/s 8,733 m^{3}/s	Modest skyscrapers, their images reflected in the water, line the bank of a wide placid river.
11	Colorado River of Texas	970 mi 1,560 km	Texas^{s, m}	32°40′47″N 101°43′51″W	Gulf of Mexico	28°35′41″N 95°58′59″W	39,900 mi^{2} 103,341 km^{2}	2,600 ft^{3}/s 75 m^{3}/s	A small stream flows through an arid plain populated with low shrubs. Much of the surrounding soil is red.
12	Tennessee River	935 mi 1,504 km	Tennessee^{s}, Alabama, Mississippi, Kentucky^{m}	35°57′33″N 83°51′01″W	Ohio River	37°04′02″N 88°33′53″W	40,880 mi^{2} 105,870 km^{2}	71,000 ft^{3}/s 2,000 m^{3}/s	The Tennessee River flowing through the Tennessee River Gorge.
13	Canadian River	906 mi 1,458 km	Colorado^{s}, New Mexico, Texas, Oklahoma^{m}	37°01′11″N 105°04′33″W	Arkansas River	35°27′12″N 95°01′58″W	47,130 mi^{2} 122,070 km^{2}	6,100 ft^{3}/s 174 m^{3}/s	A small stream in arid country flows under a railroad bridge high above the water.
14	Brazos River	860 mi 1,390 km	Texas^{s, m}	33°16′07″N 100°00′37″W	Gulf of Mexico	28°52′33″N 95°22′42″W	44,620 mi^{2} 115,566 km^{2}	8,800 ft^{3}/s 249 m^{3}/s	A train crosses a bridge over a wide river.
15	Green River	760 mi 1,230 km	Wyoming^{s}, Colorado, Utah^{m}	43°09′13″N 109°40′18″W	Colorado River	38°11′21″N 109°53′07″W	44,900 mi^{2} 116,200 km^{2}	6,100 ft^{3}/s 172 m^{3}/s	View from an airplane: A river meanders this way and that through a reddish-brown landscape.
16	Pecos River	730 mi 1,175 km	New Mexico^{s}, Texas^{m}	35°58′34″N 105°33′29″W	Rio Grande	29°41′59″N 101°22′17″W	44,000 mi^{2} 113,960 km^{2}	71 ft^{3}/s 2 m^{3}/s	A large river flows through a canyon.
17	White River (Arkansas)	720 mi 1,159 km	Arkansas^{s, m}, Missouri	35°50′20″N 93°36′16″W	Mississippi River	33°57′05″N 91°04′53″W	27,872 mi^{2} 72,189 km^{2}	34,600 ft^{3}/s 979 m^{3}/s	A wide placid river flows by a low wooded hill.
18	James River (Note: Also known as the Dakota River or Jim River and not to be confused with the James River of Virginia.)	710 mi 1,140 km	North Dakota^{s}, South Dakota^{m}	47°28′53″N 99°51′32″W	Missouri River	42°52′17″N 97°17′26″W	20,942 mi^{2} 54,240 km^{2}	854 ft^{3}/s 24.2 m^{3}/s (Note: This is the average discharge for the years 1982–94, derived by adding the discharge for each of these years and dividing by 13.)	A small stream winds through a town.
19	Kuskokwim River	702 mi 1,130 km	Alaska^{s, m}	63°05′16″N 154°38′33″W	Bering Sea	60°04′59″N 162°20′02″W	48,000 mi^{2} 124,319 km^{2}	67,000 ft^{3}s 1,900 m^{3}/s	Men and boats along the shore of a very wide river.
20	Cimarron River	698 mi 1,123 km	Oklahoma^{s, m}, Colorado, Kansas	36°54′24″N 102°59′12″W	Arkansas River	36°10′14″N 96°16′19″W	19,510 mi^{2} 50,540 km^{2}	1,500 ft^{3}/s 42 m^{3}/s	A medium-sized river winds through a flat plain dominated by brown grasses.
21	Cumberland River	696 mi 1,120 km	Kentucky^{s, m}, Tennessee	36°50′42″N 83°19′26″W	Ohio River	37°08′36″N 88°24′27″W	17,930 mi^{2} 46,430 km^{2}	30,400 ft^{3}/s 862 m^{3}/s	Several canoes pass under a bridge over a wide river in a forest.
22	Yellowstone River	678 mi 1,091 km	Wyoming^{s}, Montana, North Dakota^{m}	43°59′18″N 109°55′45″W	Missouri River	47°58′42″N 103°58′56″W	70,400 mi^{2} 182,336 km^{2}	12,800 ft^{3}/s 362 m^{3}/s	Large waterfall encased in ice.
23	North Platte River	665 mi 1,070 km	Colorado^{s}, Wyoming, Nebraska^{m}	40°38′23″N 106°24′19″W	Platte River	41°06′50″N 100°40′33″W	34,885 mi^{2} 90,352 km^{2}	770 ft^{3}/s 21.9 m^{3}/s	Canoers run rapids on a boulder-strewn river in the mountains.
24	Milk River	625 mi 1,005 km† (Note: According to The Canadian Encyclopedia, a 110-mi (170 km) stretch of the river flows through Canada. This amounts to about 18 percent of the main-stem length.)	Alberta, Montana^{s, m}	48°51′20″N 113°01′10″W	Missouri River	48°03′26″N 106°19′07″W	22,332 mi^{2} 57,839 km^{2} ‡ (Note: The Atlas of Canada: 23,600 mi^{2} (61,200 km^{2}) split between 8,300 mi^{2} (21,600 km^{2}) (about 35 percent) in Canada and 15,300 mi^{2} (39,600 km^{2}) (about 65 percent) in the United States.)	670 ft^{3}/s 18.9 m^{3}/s	Sandstones of the Milk River Formation flank the Milk river at Writing-on-Stone Provincial Park, Alberta.
25	Ouachita River	605 mi 974 km	Arkansas^{s}, Louisiana^{m}	31°41′56″N 94°19′57″W	Black River	31°37′53″N 91°48′25″W	24,886 mi^{2} 64,454 km^{2}	29,800 ft^{3}/s 843 m^{3}/s	A lock and dam on a medium-sized river
26	St. Lawrence River	600 mi 965 km † (Note: According to the U.S. Army Corps of Engineers, a 115-mi (185 km) stretch of the river forms part of the U.S.–Canada border. This amounts to about 19 percent of the main-stem length.)	New York^{s}, Ontario^{s}, Quebec^{m}	44°05′55″N 76°23′28″W	Gulf of St. Lawrence	49°40′00″N 64°30′00″W	620,000 mi^{2} 1,600,000 km^{2} ‡ (Note: Kammerer: 396,000 mi^{2} (1,030,000 km^{2}). The Atlas of Canada: 519,000 mi^{2} (1,344,200 km^{2}), of which 324,000 mi^{2} (839,200 km^{2}) (about 62 percent) is in Canada and 195,000 mi^{2} (505,000 km^{2}) (about 38 percent) is in the United States.)	440,000 ft^{3}/s 12,600 m^{3}/s (Note: Kammerer: 348,000 ft^{3}/s (9,900 m^{3}/s).)	A large ship travels along a large river bordered by vegetation on one bank and urban development on the other.
27	Gila River	600 mi 960 km	New Mexico^{s}, Arizona^{m}	33°10′47″N 108°12′22″W	Colorado River	32°43′11″N 114°33′19″W	57,850 mi^{2} 149,832 km^{2} ‡ (Note: Of this total, 232 mi^{2} (600 km^{2}) (about 0.4 percent) are in the Mexican state of Sonora, and the rest is in the United States.)	210 ft^{3}/s 6 m^{3}/s (Note: Rivers of North America describes the discharge as less than 210 ft^{3}/s (6 m^{3}/s.)	A shallow river with a sandy bed flows through an arid landscape.
28	Sheyenne River	591 mi 951 km	North Dakota^{s, m}	47°41′46″N 100°29′52″W	Red River of the North	47°01′25″N 96°49′31″W	8,800 mi^{2} 23,000 km^{2} (Note: This is the size of the basin upstream of a stream gauge near Kindred and at river mile 67.9 (river kilometer 109.3).)	288 ft^{3}/s 8.2 m^{3}/s (Note: This is the average flow measured by a stream gauge near Kindred and at river mile 67.9 (river kilometer 109.3).)	A small river rushes away from the base of a dam.
29	Tanana River	584 mi 940 km (Note: The main-stem length is calculated by subtracting the length of the Nabesna River from Kammerer's total of 659 mi (1,061 km). The Nabesna River is roughly 75 mi (121 km) long, calculated by adding the 60 mi (97 km) from the Nabesna mouth to Camp Creek to the distance, 15 mi (24 km), from Camp Creek to Nabesna Glacier, Kammerer's most remote source for the Tanana.)	Alaska^{s, m}	63°02′57″N 141°51′52″W	Yukon River	65°09′38″N 151°57′37″W	44,000 mi^{2} 114,000 km^{2}	41,800 ft^{3}/s 1,185 m^{3}/s	A shallow braided river flows over a plain partly covered by green plants and grasses. Jagged snow-covered mountains rise in the distance.
30	Smoky Hill River	576 mi 927 km	Colorado^{s}, Kansas^{m}	38°57′01″N 102°34′49″W	Kansas River	39°03′36″N 96°48′04″W	19,260 mi^{2} 49,900 km^{2} (Note: Reflects only that part of the basin above a stream gauge at river mile 43.3 (river kilometer 69.7) near Enterprise.)	1,542 ft^{3}/s 43.7 m^{3}/s (Note: Measured by a stream gauge at river mile 43.3 (river kilometer 69.7) near Enterprise.)	A small, muddy river, as seen from a bridge, meanders between tree-lined banks.
31	Niobrara River	568 mi 914 km	Wyoming^{s}, Nebraska^{m}	42°49′15″N 104°38′50″W	Missouri River	42°45′58″N 98°02′50″W	12,600 mi^{2} 32,600 km^{2}	1,700 ft^{3}/s 49 m^{3}/s	A small river flows through a field of grass and yellow flowers.
32	Little Missouri River	560 mi 900 km	Wyoming^{s}, Montana, South Dakota, North Dakota^{m}	44°32′25″N 104°59′57″W	Missouri River	47°36′38″N 102°52′24″W	8,310 mi^{2} 21,500 km^{2} (Note: This is only a close approximation of the entire basin. It does not include a small fraction of the basin below the river gauge, located about 25 mi (40 km) upstream of the river mouth.)	450 ft^{3}/s 13 m^{3}/s (Note: This is the average discharge for the years 1990–2010, derived by adding the discharge for each of these years and dividing by 21.)	A small river meanders through a landscape of forests, bluffs, and rocky outcrops.
33	Sabine River	553 mi 890 km	Texas^{s}, Louisiana^{m}	32°48′29″N 95°55′14″W	Gulf of Mexico	29°59′08″N 93°47′26″W	9,756 mi^{2} 25,268 km^{2}	8,400 ft^{3}/s 238 m^{3}/s	A wide river flows under a highway bridge.
34	Red River of the North	550 mi 890 km † (Note: According to the Minnesota Department of Natural Resources, 394 mi (634 km) are in the United States. This amounts to about 72 percent of the main-stem length.)	North Dakota^{s}, Minnesota^{s}, Manitoba^{m}	46°15′52″N 96°35′55″W	Lake Winnipeg	50°23′47″N 96°48′39″W	111,000 mi^{2} 287,500 km^{2} ‡ (Note: Of the total basin, 53,500 mi^{2} (138,600 km^{2}) (about 48 percent) are in Canada and 57,500 mi^{2} (148,900 km^{2}) (about 52 percent) are in the United States.)	8,300 ft^{3}/s 236 m^{3}/s	A small river flows through a prairie landscape; brown grasses and leafless trees line the banks.
35	Des Moines River	525 mi 845 km	Minnesota^{s}, Missouri, Iowa^{m}	44°05′02″N 95°41′17″W	Mississippi River	41°22′52″N 91°25′21″W	12,018 mi^{2} 31,127 km^{2}	6,400 ft^{3}/s 182 m^{3}/s	A placid river flows through a prairie landscape.
36	White River (Missouri River)	506 mi 815 km	Nebraska^{s}, South Dakota^{m}	42°41′10″N 103°50′14″W	Missouri River	43°42′50″N 99°28′01″W	10,200 mi^{2} 26,418 km^{2}	570 ft^{3}/s 16 m^{3}/s	A small stream flows through grasses and shrubs at the base of a rocky hill.
37	Trinity River	506 mi 815 km	Texas^{s, m}	32°47′54″N 96°53′52″W	Galveston Bay	29°44′35″N 94°42′12″W	17,970 mi^{2} 46,540 km^{2}	7,800 ft^{3}/s 222 m^{3}/s	A middle-sized river flows by a factory with two tall smokestacks.
38	Wabash River	503 mi 810 km	Ohio^{s}, Indiana^{m}, Illinois^{m}	40°21′07″N 84°45′57″W	Ohio River	37°47′53″N 88°01′38″W	32,950 mi^{2} 85,340 km^{2}	1,001 ft^{3}/s 28 m^{3}/s	A middle-sized river with sandy and grassy banks flows under a bridge.

== Map ==
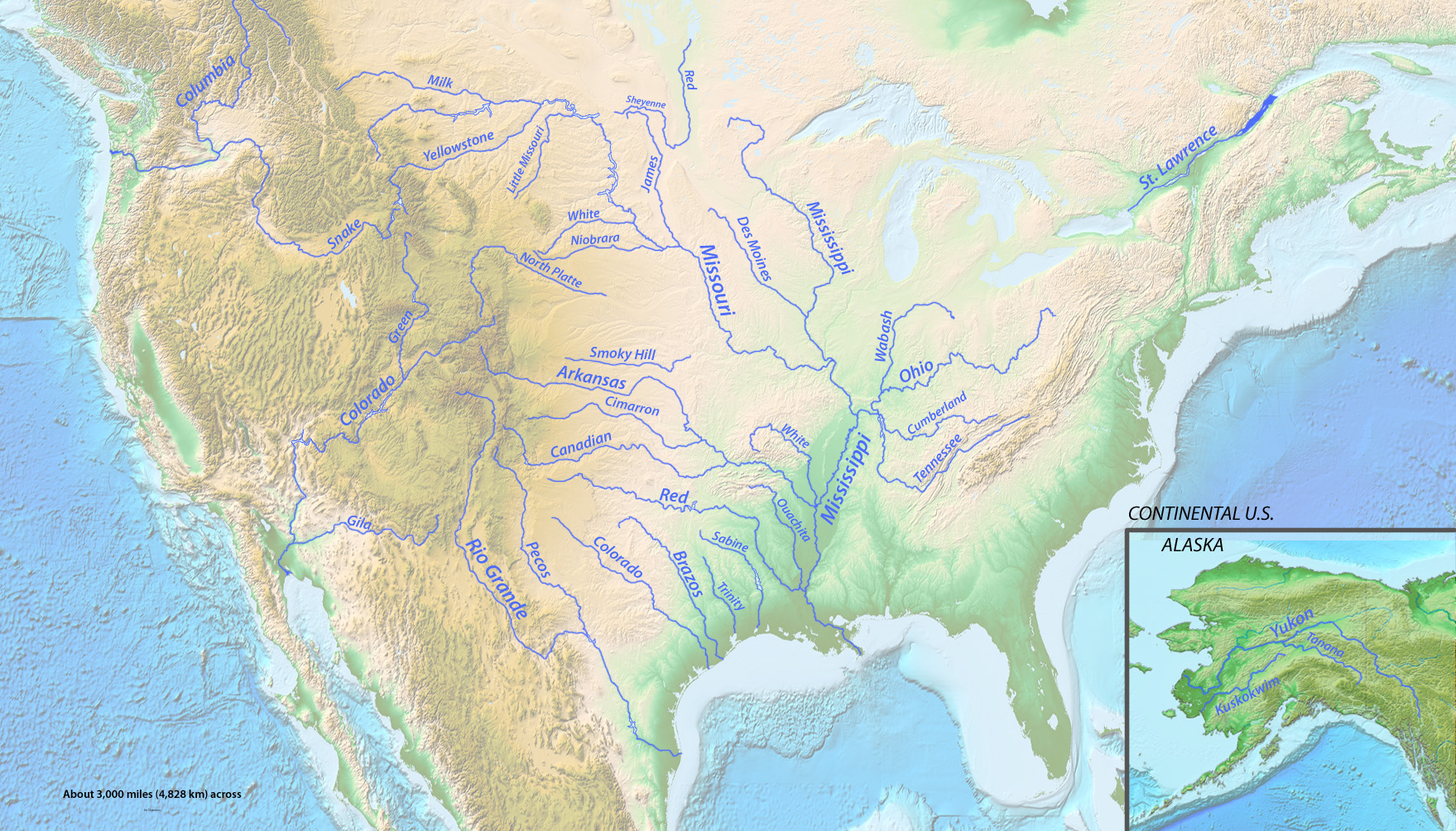
Map of North America showing all rivers on this list.

== See also ==
- List of rivers of the United States
- List of rivers of the United States by discharge
- List of longest rivers in the United States by state
  - List of longest streams of Idaho
  - List of longest streams of Minnesota
  - List of longest streams of Oregon
- List of rivers by length

== Works cited ==
- Benke, Arthur C.; Cushing, Colbert E. (2005). Rivers of North America. Burlington, Massachusetts: Elsevier Academic Press. ISBN 978-0-12-088253-3.
- Patrick, Ruth (1995). Rivers of the United States: Volume II: Chemical and Physical Characteristics. New York: John Wiley & Sons. p. 24. ISBN 978-0-471-10752-1.
