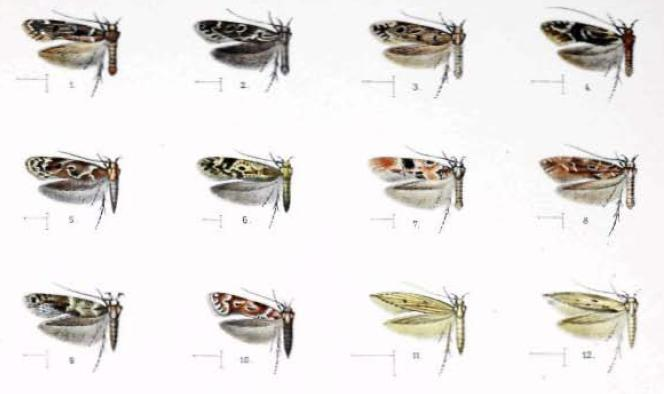
- Illustrations in Fauna Hawaiiensis: 1. Hyposmocoma subscolopax, 2. Hyposmocoma tetraonella, 3. Hyposmocoma somatodes, 4. Hyposmocoma belophora, 5. Hyposmocoma turdella, 6. Hyposmocoma subcitrella, 7. Hyposmocoma inflexa, 8. Hyposmocoma brevistrigata, 9. Hyposmocoma discolor, 10. Hyposmocoma fuscotogata, 11. Hyposmocoma radiatella and 12. Hyposmocoma barbata

Scientific classification
- Domain: Eukaryota
- Kingdom: Animalia
- Phylum: Arthropoda
- Class: Insecta
- Order: Lepidoptera
- Family: Cosmopterigidae
- Genus: Hyposmocoma
- Species: H. inflexa

Binomial name
- Hyposmocoma inflexa Walsingham, 1907

= Hyposmocoma inflexa =

Species of moth

Hyposmocoma inflexa is a species of moth of the family Cosmopterigidae. It was first described by Thomas de Grey the 6th in 1907. It is endemic to the Hawaiian island of Maui. The type locality is Haleakalā, where it was collected at an altitude of 5,000 feet (1,500 m).
