= Pāpaʻaloa, Hawaii =

Unincorporated community in Hawaii, United States

Pāpaʻaloa
- Unincorporated community
- Location within the state of Hawaii
- Coordinates: 19°58′44″N 155°13′16″W
- Country: United States
- State: Hawaii
- County: Hawaiʻi
- Elevation: 10 ft (3.0 m)
- Time zone: UTC−10 (Hawaii–Aleutian)
- ZIP codes: 96780
- GNIS feature ID: 363109

Pāpaʻaloa is an unincorporated community on the island of Hawaiʻi in Hawaiʻi County, Hawaii, United States. It lies along Hawaii Route 19 north of Hilo, the county seat of Hawaiʻi County. Its elevation is about 300 feet above sea level (about 90 m) Because the community has borne multiple names, the Board on Geographic Names officially designated it "Papaaloa" in 1914 and 1954 before assigning the current name in 2001. It has a post office with the ZIP code 96780.

Three streams flow around or through Pāpaʻaloa, Hawaii. Kihalani Stream borders the northwest side, Kaiwilahilah Stream is in the middle, and Ha'akoa Stream borders the southeast side.
