= List of rivers of the United States by discharge =

This is a list of rivers in the continental United States by average discharge (streamflow) in cubic feet per second. All rivers with average discharge more than 15,000 cubic feet per second are listed. Estimates are approximate, because data are variable with time period measured and also because many rivers lack a gauging station near their point of outflow.

No	River	Length		Average discharge		Outflow
No	River	miles	km	cu ft/s	m^{3}/s	Outflow
1	Mississippi River	2,320	3,730	593,000	16,800 m^{3}/s	Gulf of Mexico
2	Ohio River	979	1,575	281,500	7,970 m^{3}/s	Mississippi River
3	St. Lawrence River	600	965	348,000 (275,000 at U.S.-Canada boundary)	9,900 m^{3}/s (7,800 m^{3}/s at U.S.-Canada boundary)	Gulf of Saint Lawrence
4	Columbia River	1,243	2,000	273,000	7,700 m^{3}/s	Pacific Ocean
5	Yukon River	1,980	3,185	227,000	6,400 m^{3}/s	Bering Sea
6	Atchafalaya River	137	220	225,000	6,400 m^{3}/s	Gulf of Mexico
7	Niagara River	36	58	204,700	5,800 m^{3}/s	Lake Ontario
8	Detroit River	32	51	188,000	5,300 m^{3}/s	Lake Erie
9	St. Clair River	39	63	183,000	5,200 m^{3}/s	Lake St. Clair
10	Missouri River	2,341	3,767	86,300	2,440 m^{3}/s	Mississippi River
11	St. Marys River	75	120	75,000	2,100 m^{3}/s	Lake Huron-Lake Michigan
12	Tennessee River	652	1,049	68,000	1,900 m^{3}/s	Ohio River
13	Mobile River	45	72	67,000	1,900 m^{3}/s	Gulf of Mexico
14	Kuskokwim River	702	1,130	67,000	1,900 m^{3}/s	Bering Sea
15	Red River	1,360	2,190	58,000	1,600 m^{3}/s	Atchafalaya River
16	Copper River	290	470	57,400	1,630 m^{3}/s	Gulf of Alaska
17	Snake River	1,040	1,674	55,000	1,600 m^{3}/s	Columbia River
18	Stikine River	379	610	56,000	1,600 m^{3}/s	Pacific Ocean
19	Susitna River	313	504	51,000	1,400 m^{3}/s	Gulf of Alaska
20	Arkansas River	1,443	2,322	44,500	1,260 m^{3}/s	Mississippi River
21	Tanana River	584	940	41,800	1,180 m^{3}/s	Yukon River
22	Saint John River	418	673	38,800	1,100 m^{3}/s	Bay of Fundy
23	Susquehanna River	464	747	38,200	1,080 m^{3}/s	Chesapeake Bay
24	Willamette River	187	301	37,400	1,060 m^{3}/s	Columbia River
25	Wabash River	503	810	34,500	980 m^{3}/s	Ohio River
26	Alabama River	318	512	32,500	920 m^{3}/s	Mobile River
27	Nushagak River	280	450	32,000?	910 m^{3}/s	Bering Sea
28	Alsek River	240	386	31,000	880 m^{3}/s	Gulf of Alaska
29	Cumberland River	696	1,120	30,000?	850 m^{3}/s	Ohio River
30	Black River-Ouachita River	605	974	29,800	840 m^{3}/s	Red River
31	White River	720	1,159	29,500	840 m^{3}/s	Mississippi River
32	Pend Oreille River	130	210	27,000	760 m^{3}/s	Columbia River
33	Tombigbee River	200	320	26,300	740 m^{3}/s	Mobile River
34	Koyukuk River	425	684	25,000?	710 m^{3}/s	Yukon River
35	Illinois River	273	439	24,000	680 m^{3}/s	Mississippi River
36	Sacramento River	447	719	23,500	670 m^{3}/s	Pacific Ocean
37	Porcupine River	569	916	23,000	650 m^{3}/s	Yukon River
38	Colorado River	1,450	2,330	22,000	620 m^{3}/s	Gulf of California
39	Clark Fork River	310	500	21,900	620 m^{3}/s	Pend Oreille River
40	Hudson River	315	507	21,900	620 m^{3}/s	Atlantic Ocean
41	Yentna River	75	121	21,000?	590 m^{3}/s	Susitna River
42	Chitina River	112	180	20,000?	570 m^{3}/s	Copper River
43	Allegheny River	320	523	19,900	560 m^{3}/s	Ohio River
44	Apalachicola River	50	80	19,602	555.1 m^{3}/s	Gulf of Mexico
45	Connecticut River	407	655	18,400	520 m^{3}/s	Atlantic Ocean
46	Kvichak River	50	80	17,900	510 m^{3}/s	Bering Sea
47	Klamath River	263	423	17,300	490 m^{3}/s	Pacific Ocean
48	Santee River	143	230	17,000(approx.)	480 m^{3}/s	Atlantic Ocean
49	Skagit River	150	240	16,500	470 m^{3}/s	Pacific Ocean
50	Kootenai (Kootenay) River	485	781	27,600 (approx. 16,000? at U.S.-Canada boundary)	780 m^{3}/s (approx. 450 m^{3}/s? at U.S.-Canada boundary)	Columbia River
51	Coosa River	280	450	16,000	450 m^{3}/s	Alabama River
52	Kanawha River	97	156	16,000	450 m^{3}/s	Ohio River
53	Clearwater River	75	120	15,300	430 m^{3}/s	Snake River
54	Kobuk River	280	451	15,300	430 m^{3}/s	Bering Sea
55	St. Johns River	310	500	15,000?	420 m^{3}/s	Atlantic Ocean
56	Pee Dee River	232	373	15,000?	420 m^{3}/s	Atlantic Ocean

== See also ==
- List of rivers of the United States
- List of longest rivers of the United States (by main stem)
- List of longest rivers in the United States by state
- List of rivers by discharge
