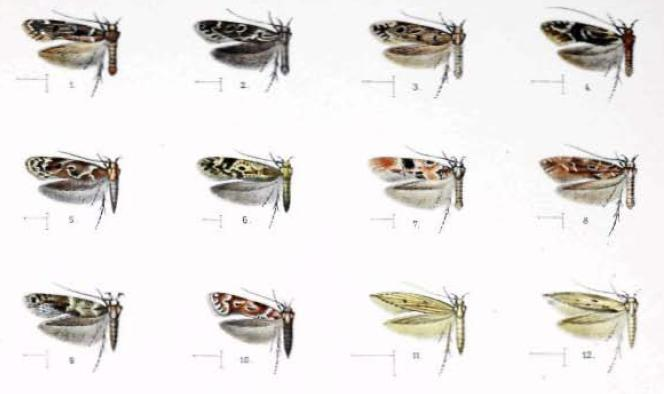
- Illustrations in Fauna Hawaiiensis: 1. Hyposmocoma subscolopax, 2. Hyposmocoma tetraonella, 3. Hyposmocoma somatodes, 4. Hyposmocoma belophora, 5. Hyposmocoma turdella, 6. Hyposmocoma subcitrella, 7. Hyposmocoma inflexa, 8. Hyposmocoma brevistrigata, 9. Hyposmocoma discolor, 10. Hyposmocoma fuscotogata, 11. Hyposmocoma radiatella and 12. Hyposmocoma barbata

Scientific classification
- Domain: Eukaryota
- Kingdom: Animalia
- Phylum: Arthropoda
- Class: Insecta
- Order: Lepidoptera
- Family: Cosmopterigidae
- Genus: Hyposmocoma
- Species: H. subcitrella

Binomial name
- Hyposmocoma subcitrella Walsingham, 1907

= Hyposmocoma subcitrella =

Species of moth

Hyposmocoma subcitrella is a species of moth of the family Cosmopterigidae. It was first described by Lord Walsingham in 1907. It is endemic to the Hawaiian island of Kauai. The type locality is Kaholuamano, where it was collected at an elevation of 4,000 feet (1,200 m).
