= Honolii Stream =

Honoliʻi Stream
- Location of mouth

Location
- Country: United States
- State: Hawaii

Physical characteristics
- Mouth
  - coordinates: 19°45′26″N 155°05′37″W
- Length: 32 m (105 ft)

Basin features
- River system: Pacific Ocean

Honoliʻi Stream is a stream located on the Island of Hawai'i. It rises on the upper eastern slope of Mauna Kea and empties in the Pacific Ocean near Hilo. The river is 32 miles long, and has a beach at the end, called Honoli'i Beach.
