= Waimea River (Oʻahu) =

River in Hawaii, U.S.

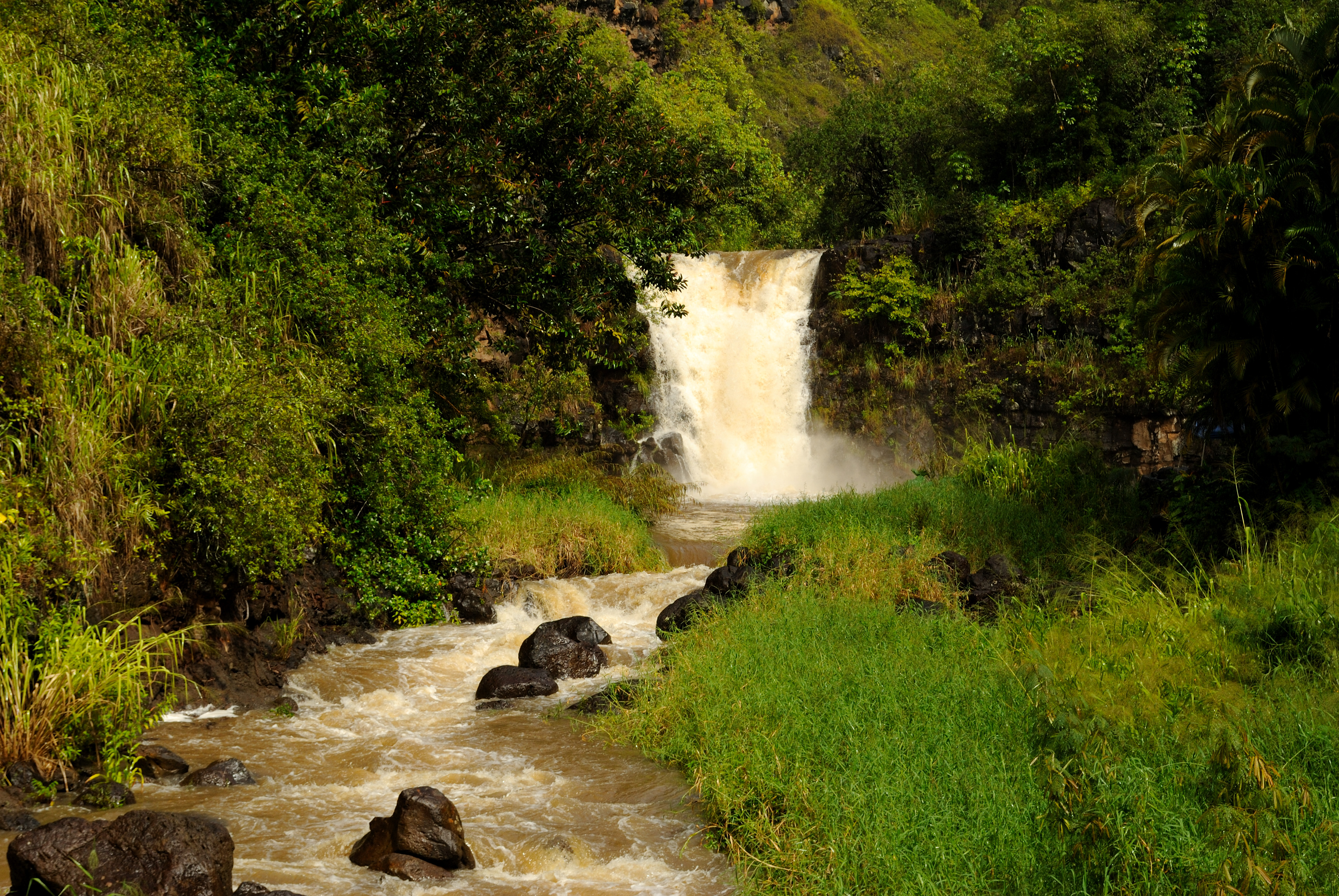
- Waimea Falls on the Kamananui stream a tributary of the Waimea

- Location of the mouth within Oahu

Location
- Country: United States
- State: Hawaii
- County: Honolulu County

Physical characteristics
- Source
  - location: Waimea Valley
- Mouth
  - location: Waimea Bay
  - coordinates: 21.64074°N 158.06324°W
- Length: 1.5 mi (2.4 km), 24.4 km (15.2 mi) total length
- Basin size: 13.6 sq mi (35 km^{2})

The Waimea River is a river in Honolulu County on the island of Oʻahu in the U.S. state of Hawaii. The river's main channel is 1.5 miles (2.4 km) long and has a watershed spanning 13.6 square miles, with a total length of 24.4 km (15.2 mi) when its tributaries are included. It is formed by the confluence of the Kamananui stream and the Kaiwikoʻele stream northeast of Haleiwa and flows northwest through the Waimea Valley to the Pacific Ocean at Waimea Bay. The name Waimea translates to "red water."

The mouth of the river has become famous for its waves that are created when residents dredge the beach, creating a channel that allows the watercourse to drain when it is cut off by the beach.

== See also ==
- List of rivers of Hawaii
