= Kaukonahua River =

Kaukonahua River Kaukonahua Stream
- Location of mouth Kaukonahua River (Hawaii)

Location
- Country: United States
- State: Hawaii
- Region: Oahu

Physical characteristics
- Source
  - location: Oahu, Hawaii
  - coordinates: 21.4970382°N 158.0488229°W
- Mouth
  - location: Kaiʻaka Bay, Pacific Ocean
  - coordinates: 21°34′47″N 158°7′10″W
  - elevation: Sea level
- Length: ~ 53 km (33 mi)

The Kaukonahua Stream or Kaukonahua River is a 9.9-mile-long (15.9 km) river on the island of Oʻahu which is one of the Hawaiian Islands. Including its longer South Fork, the stream's total length is 28.0 miles (45.1 km). It flows down in a generally northwest direction, from 21°30′7″N 157°54′13″W into the Pacific Ocean. The North and South forks meet at coordinates 21°29′44″N 158°5′50″W. It is the longest river of the whole island group. It empties into Kaiʻaka Bay near Waialua, Hawaii on the North shore.

== Environmental concerns ==
Water quality monitoring has identified elevated levels of pollutants in Kaiʻaka Bay and nearby waterways that drain the Kaukonahua River watershed. Some contaminants have been reported to exceed Hawaii State Water Quality Standards.
