= Anahulu River =

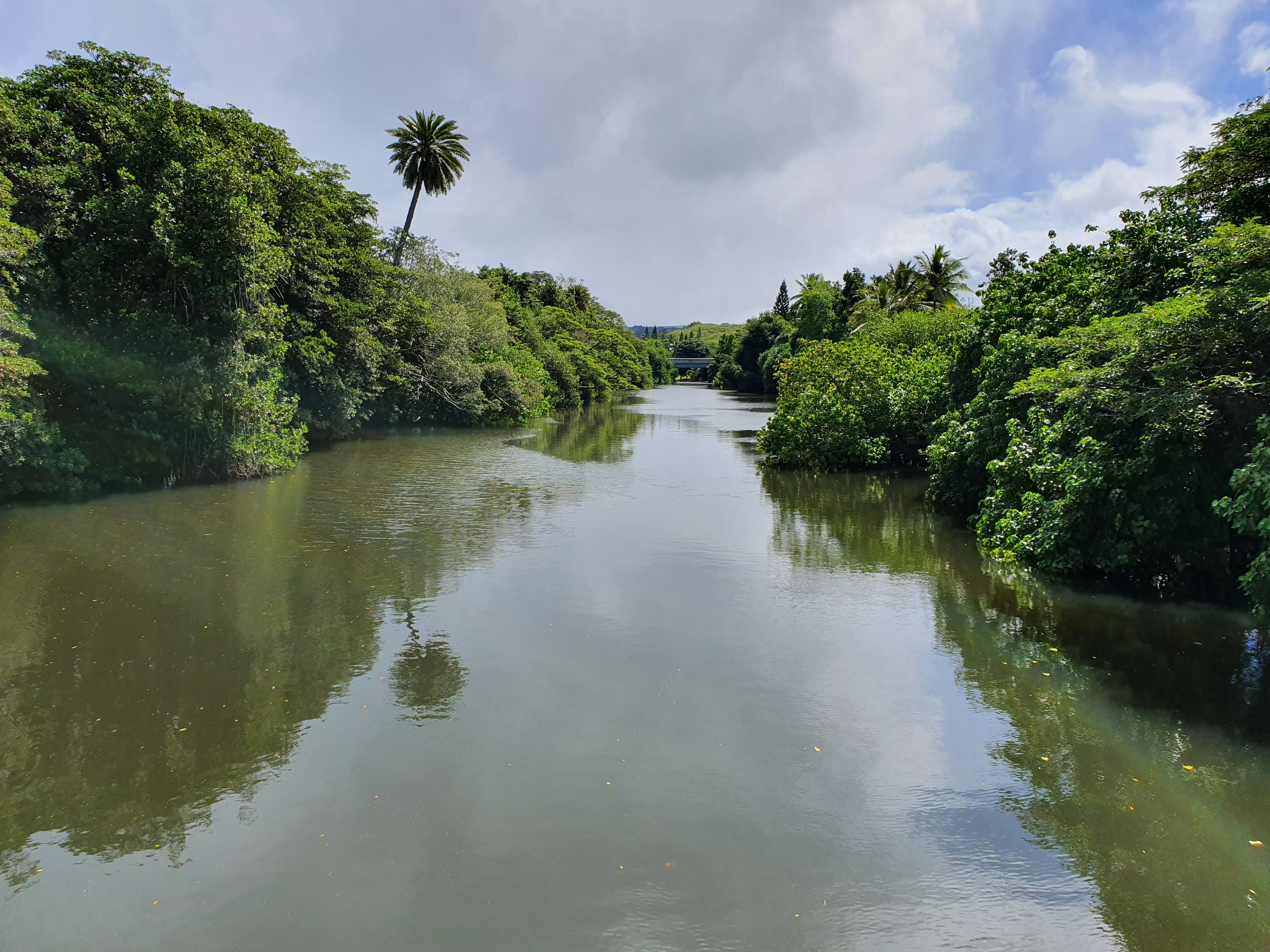
- Anahulu River

- Location of mouth

Location
- Country: United States
- State: Hawaii
- Region: Oahu

Physical characteristics
- Source: confluence of Kawainui and Kawaiiki streams
  - coordinates: 21°34′43″N 158°00′57″W
- Mouth: Pacific Ocean
  - location: Waialua Bay
  - coordinates: 21°35′40″N 158°6′15″W
- Length: 7.1 mi (11.4 km)
- Basin size: 16 sq mi (41 km^{2})
- Discharge
  - maximum: 16,200 cu ft/s (460 m^{3}/s)

The Anahulu River (also called Anahulu Stream) is a watercourse on the island of Oahu in the U.S. state of Hawaii. It is 7.1 miles (11.4 km) long. The Hawaiian meaning of the name is ten days.

== Description ==
It is formed on the western side of the northern Koolau Range approximately 7 miles (11 km) northeast of Wahiawā by the confluence of Kawainui and Kawaiiki streams, both perennial. It flows west-northwest descending through Kawailoa Gulch, then empties into the eastern end of Waialua Bay at Haleiwa. It has a watershed of approximately 16 square miles (41 km^{2}) and a 100-year peak discharge of 16,200 ft^{3}/s (459 m^{3}/s.

Archaeological evidence indicates that the valley of the river near its mouth was the site of ancient Hawaiian villages. The river valley was abandoned but was later repopulated in the early 19th century, partly as the result of a policy by a King Kamehameha I to grow food to support his military expeditions. The policy included the development of irrigated terraces. In 1832 U.S. Protestant missionaries John Emerson and his wife Ursula Sophia circumnavigated Oahu and put in at the mouth of the river, located at 21°35′40″N 158°6′15″W. At the village of Haleiwa (from hale (home) of the iwa (frigate bird)), they were welcomed by Chief Laanui and established the Liliuokalani Church in the village.

In the later 19th century the village of Haleiwa and the surrounding river valley became a popular summer vacation destination for the Hawaiian monarchs. The first hotel was built along the river by businessman Benjamin Dillingham, who also built Oahu railroad from Honolulu to the north shore in 1898. The railroad and hotel made the river valley a popular vacation spot.
