= List of tributaries of the Mississippi River =

This is a sortable list of direct tributaries of the Mississippi River.

== Map of Mississippi River Basin ==
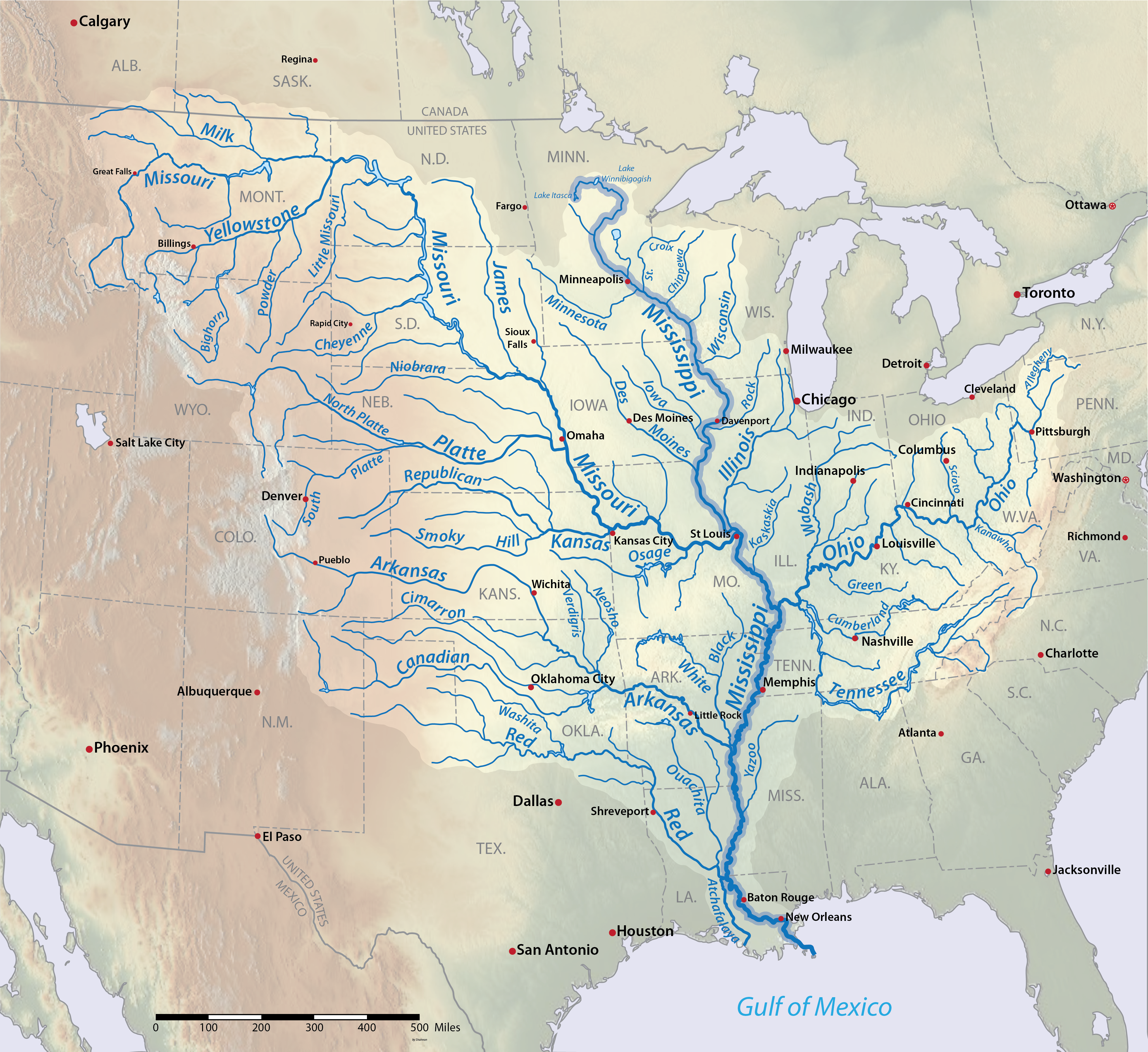

== Table of Mississippi River Tributaries ==
Waterway	Orientation	Length	River flow at Discharge	Mouth coordinates	Mouth location	Source coordinates	Source location
Apple River	Left	55 mi (89 km)		42°10′35″N 90°14′36″W	Savanna	42°33′51″N 90°09′47″W	Shullsburg
Arkansas River	Right	1,469 mi (2,364 km)	39,800 cu ft/s (1,128 m^{3}/s)	33°46′30″N 91°06′10″W	Napoleon, AR	39°15′30″N 106°20′38″W	Leadville, CO
Bassett Creek	Right	13 mi (21 km)		44°59′27″N 93°16′21″W	Minneapolis	44°59′41″N 93°24′46″W	Medicine Lake
Bee Branch Creek	Right	5.0 mi (8 km)		42°30′36″N 90°39′10″W	Dubuque	42°30′N 90°41′W	Dubuque
Big Black River	Left	330 mi (531 km)	3,800 cu ft/s (108 m^{3}/s)	32°03′11″N 91°03′27″W	Vicksburg, MS	33°41′40″N 89°07′59″W	Webster County, MS
Big Muddy River	Left	156 mi (251 km)	2,200 cu ft/s (61 m^{3}/s)	37°34′25″N 89°31′02″W	Grand Tower, IL	38°26′12″N 89°03′05″W	Centralia, IL
Black River	Left	190 mi (310 km)	3,000 cu ft/s (85 m^{3}/s)	43°49′12″N 91°15′26″W	La Crosse, WI	44°35′26″N 90°17′49″W	Taylor County, WI
Buffalo River	Left	68 mi (110 km)		44°21′02″N 91°55′35″W	Alma	44°34′39″N 91°13′57″W	Osseo
Cannon River	Right	110 mi (180 km)		44°35′09″N 92°33′25″W	Red Wing	44°22′08″N 93°26′32″W	Shieldsville
Catfish Creek	Right	21 mi (34 km)		42°28′05″N 90°38′41″W	Dubuque	42°26′27″N 90°46′53″W	Peosta
Chippewa River	Left	183 mi (294 km)	4,500 cu ft/s (127 m^{3}/s)	44°24′33″N 92°05′03″W	Buffalo County, WI	45°53′25″N 91°04′41″W	Bayfield County, WI
Clearwater River	Right	43 mi (70 km)		45°25′22″N 94°02′57″W	Clearwater	45°21′23″N 94°25′54″W	Stearns County
Crow River	Right	24.8 mi (39.9 km)		45°14′45″N 93°31′21″W	Dayton	45°04′53″N 93°45′45″W	Rockford
Crow Wing River	Right	113 mi (182 km)	1,600 cu ft/s (45 m^{3}/s)	46°16′16″N 94°20′23″W	Crow Wing, MN	47°00′07″N 94°44′29″W	Akeley, MN
Cuivre River	Right	43.4 mi (69.9 km)	670 cu ft/s (19 m^{3}/s)	39°01′02″N 90°59′34″W	Bedford Township, MO	38°56′00″N 90°41′13″W	Monroe Township, MO
Deer River	Left	19 mi (30 km)		47°18′53″N 93°46′46″W	Deer River	47°23′20″N 93°42′28″W	Itasca County
Des Moines River	Right	525 mi (845 km)	13,200 cu ft/s (374 m^{3}/s)	40°22′52″N 91°25′21″W	Keokuk, IA	44°05′02″N 95°41′17″W	Lake Shetek, MN
Edwards River	Left	74 mi (119 km)		41°08′54″N 90°58′54″W	New Boston	41°15′15″N 89°58′46″W	Kewanee
Elk River	Left	84 mi (135 km)		45°17′53″N 93°34′21″W	Elk River	45°49′07″N 93°55′39″W	Benton County
Fabius River	Right	3.5 mi (5.6 km)		39°53′11″N 91°27′10″W	Fabius Township	39°53′58″N 91°30′20″W	Fabius Township
Fox River	Right	107 mi (172 km)		40°17′05″N 91°29′39″W	Alexandria	40°45′13″N 92°43′26″W	Bloomfield
Galena River	Left	52 mi (84 km)		42°22′27″N 90°26′46″W	Galena	42°45′17″N 90°23′04″W	Belmont
Grant River	Left	44 mi (71 km)		42°39′48″N 90°44′48″W	Potosi	42°53′09″N 90°43′43″W	Lancaster
Hatchie River	Left	238 mi (383 km)	13,000 cu ft/s (370 m^{3}/s)	35°33′05″N 89°53′38″W	Randolph, TN	34°34′29″N 88°49′48″W	Union County, MS
Henderson Creek	Left	65 mi (104 km)		40°52′31″N 91°01′51″W	Burlington	41°01′57″N 90°18′11″W	Henderson
Homochitto River	Left	90 mi (145 km)		31°18′53″N 91°30′11″W	Natchez	31°42′15″N 90°37′28″W	Hazlehurst
Illinois River	Left	268 mi (432 km)	23,300 cu ft/s (659 m^{3}/s)	38°58′13″N 90°27′15″W	Grafton	41°23′37″N 88°15′37″W	Confluence of the Kankakee and Des Plains rivers near Joliet, IL
Iowa	Right	320 mi (520 km)	14,000 cu ft/s (400 m^{3}/s)	41°09′38″N 91°01′26″W	Louisa County, IA	43°13′33″N 93°47′19″W	Hancock County, IA
Kaskaskia River	Left	320 mi (515 km)	15,000 cu ft/s (420 m^{3}/s)	37°58′30″N 89°56′15″W	Chester, IL	40°05′11″N 88°18′52″W	Champaign, IL
La Crosse River	Left	61 mi (98 km)		43°49′07″N 91°15′23″W	La Crosse	44°06′54″N 90°36′34″W	Warrens
Little Elk River	Right	29 mi (47 km)		46°00′36″N 94°21′49″W	Little Falls	46°09′28″N 94°37′18″W	Cushing Township
Little Maquoketa River	Right	30 mi (48 km)		42°34′37″N 90°40′52″W	Sageville	42°29′46″N 90°59′49″W	Farley
Little Menominee River	Left	14 mi (23 km)		42°25′31″N 90°32′04″W	Menominee	42°33′42″N 90°32′10″W	Hazel Green
Little Two River	Right	16 mi (26 km)		45°49′50″N 94°21′22″W	Two Rivers Township	45°50′55″N 94°33′54″W	Swanville Township
Little Willow River	Left	26 mi (42 km)		46°33′52″N 93°45′12″W	Aitkin Township	46°43′45″N 93°41′37″W	Waukenabo Township
Maquoketa River	Right	150 mi (240 km)	1,100 cu ft/s (32 m^{3}/s)	42°11′18″N 90°18′34″W	Maquoketa, IA	42°43′08″N 91°42′39″W	Fayette County, IA
Marys River	Left	41 mi (66 km)		37°52′49″N 89°46′59″W	Chester	38°09′27″N 89°38′49″W	Randolph County
Menominee River	Left	11 mi (18 km)		42°27′04″N 90°35′24″W	Jo Daviess County	42°33′44″N 90°36′09″W	Grant County
Meramec River	Right	220 mi (350 km)	3,300 cu ft/s (94 m^{3}/s)	38°23′23″N 90°20′39″W	Arnold, MO	37°30′29″N 91°19′39″W	Dent County, MO
Minnehaha Creek	Right	14 mi (22 km)		44°54′32″N 93°12′02″W	Hiawatha	44°57′14″N 93°29′11″W	Minnetonka
Minnesota River	Right	332 mi (534 km)	8,300 cu ft/s (236 m^{3}/s)	44°53′49″N 93°08′57″W	Mendota, MN	45°18′10″N 96°27′07″W	Big Stone Lake, MN
Missouri River	Right	2,315 mi (3,726 km)	87,500 cu ft/s (2,478 m^{3}/s)	38°48′49″N 90°07′11″W	Spanish Lake, MO	45°55′39″N 111°30′29″W	Confluence of Jefferson and Madison Rivers near Three Forks, MT
Nokasippi River	Left	47 mi (75 km)		46°10′39″N 94°21′53″W	Fort Ripley Township	46°24′47″N 93°54′34″W	Bay Lake Township
North River	Right	82 mi (132 km)		39°51′21″N 91°26′41″W	Palmyra	40°03′30″N 92°15′26″W	Shelton Township
Obion River	Left	72 mi (116 km)		35°54′27″N 89°38′20″W	Halls	36°12′22″N 88°56′27″W	Kenton
Ohio River	Left	981 mi (1,579 km)	340,000 cu ft/s (9,600 m^{3}/s)	36°59′12″N 89°07′52″W	Cairo, IL	40°26′35″N 80°01′02″W	Pittsburgh, PA
Pigeon River	Left	6.8 mi (11 km)		47°30′41″N 94°09′34″W	Deer River	47°34′18″N 94°09′21″W	Bowstring Lake
Pine Creek	Right	24 mi (38 km)		43°48′27″N 91°16′06″W	La Crescent	43°53′19″N 91°32′17″W	New Hartford Township
Pine River	Left	56.9 mi (91.6 km)		46°33′50″N 94°02′12″W	Mission Township	46°48′15″N 94°31′23″W	Backus
Platte River	Left	55 mi (89 km)		45°46′45″N 94°16′45″W	Royalton	46°09′01″N 93°56′06″W	Richardson Township
Plum River	Left	47 mi (75 km)		42°05′14″N 90°09′15″W	Savanna	42°20′08″N 89°59′14″W	Stockton Township
Prairie River	Left	50 mi (80 km)		47°12′54″N 93°28′57″W	La Prairie	47°35′39″N 93°10′52″W	Itasca County
Rabbit River	Left	9.3 mi (15 km)		46°27′41″N 94°03′51″W	Riverton	46°31′23″N 93°56′53″W	Wolford Township
Rice Creek	Left	28 mi (45 km)		45°05′20″N 93°16′44″W	Fridley	45°09′14″N 93°05′04″W	Forest Lake
Rice River	Left	57 mi (92 km)		46°35′23″N 93°38′04″W	Spencer Township	46°22′57″N 93°19′04″W	Jewett
Ripple River	Right	42 mi (68 km)		46°32′30″N 93°42′01″W	Aitkin Township	46°24′19″N 93°49′52″W	Bay Lake Township
River aux Vases	Right	37 mi (60 km)		37°55′10″N 89°59′32″W	St. Mary	37°46′44″N 90°15′48″W	Ste. Genevieve County
River des Peres	Right	9.3 mi (15 km)		38°31′59″N 90°15′38″W	St. Louis	38°37′14″N 90°16′39″W	St. Louis
Rock River	Left	285 mi (459 km)	7,200 cu ft/s (204 m^{3}/s)	41°28′57″N 90°36′58″W	Rock Island, IL	43°28′26″N 88°38′41″W	Horicon Marsh, WI
Root River	Right	50 mi (80 km)		43°45′43″N 91°15′06″W	Brownsville, MN	43°48′24″N 92°15′06″W	Chatfield, MN
Rum River	Left	151 mi (243 km)	670 cu ft/s (19 m^{3}/s)	45°11′24″N 93°23′25″W	Anoka, MN	46°09′38″N 93°45′21″W	Mille Lacs Lake, MN
Rush River	Left	43 mi (70 km)		44°33′29″N 92°19′51″W	Saint Paul	44°57′47″N 92°23′42″W	Baldwin
Saline Creek	Right	31 mi (50 km)		37°54′22″N 89°58′30″W	St. Mary	37°44′42″N 90°15′11″W	Ste. Genevieve County
Salt River	Right	55 mi (89 km)		39°28′00″N 91°03′48″W	Louisiana	39°31′27″N 91°38′38″W	Perry County
Sandy River	Left	35 mi (57 km)		46°47′23″N 93°19′40″W	Libby Township	46°35′17″N 93°04′23″W	Salo Township
Sauk River	Right	122 mi (196 km)	340 cu ft/s (9.7 m^{3}/s)	45°35′30″N 94°10′36″W	Sauk Rapids, MN	45°53′46″N 95°05′48″W	Lake Osakis, MN
Schoolcraft River	Right	30 mi (48 km)		47°26′36″N 94°53′32″W	Bemidji	47°07′58″N 95°01′16″W	Clay Township
Sinsinawa River	Left	21 mi (34 km)		42°24′36″N 90°30′20″W	Menominee Township	42°34′56″N 90°31′41″W	Dickeyville
Skunk River	Right	93 mi (150 km)		40°41′53″N 91°06′54″W	Burlington	41°14′55″N 92°01′35″W	Richland
St. Croix River	Right	164 mi (264 km)	6,400 cu ft/s (180 m^{3}/s)	44°44′45″N 92°48′10″W	Prescott, WI	46°19′42″N 91°48′40″W	Solon Springs, WI
St. Francis River	Right	426 mi (686 km)	8,980 cu ft/s (254.2 m^{3}/s)	34°37′28″N 90°35′31″W	Phillips County, AR	37°40′56″N 90°40′34″W	Iron County, MO
Swan River	Left	60 mi (97 km)		47°00′33″N 93°15′50″W	Ball Bluff Township	47°17′19″N 93°13′56″W	Pengilly
Trimbelle River	Left	29 mi (47 km)		44°36′14″N 92°34′03″W	Trenton	44°51′56″N 92°28′06″W	River Falls
Turtle River	Left	49 mi (79 km)		47°28′11″N 94°31′27″W	Cass Lake	47°38′47″N 94°57′35″W	Liberty Township
Two River	Right	5.6 mi (9 km)		45°49′30″N 94°21′26″W	Two Rivers Township	45°48′20″N 94°24′47″W	Two Rivers Township
Upper Iowa River	Right	156 mi (251 km)	710 cu ft/s (20 m^{3}/s)	43°27′58″N 91°14′02″W	New Albin, IA	43°35′54″N 92°35′24″W	Mower County, MN
Vermillion River	Right	60 mi (96 km)		44°36′07″N 92°35′26″W	Red Wing	44°35′11″N 93°20′03″W	New Market Township
Wapsipinicon River	Right	300 mi (480 km)	1,800 cu ft/s (52 m^{3}/s)	41°43′47″N 90°19′11″W	Clinton, IA	43°32′55″N 92°38′40″W	Taopi, MN
Wells Creek	Right	27 mi (44 km)		44°30′56″N 92°19′06″W	Frontenac,	44°23′06″N 92°34′04″W	Goodhue Township
White River	Right	722 mi (1,162 km)	26,200 cu ft/s (741 m^{3}/s)	33°57′05″N 91°04′53″W	Watson, AR	35°50′20″N 93°36′16″W	Boston Mountains, AR
Whitewater River	Right	10.3 mi (16.6 km)	133 cu ft/s (3.76 m^{3}/s)	44°12′33″N 91°54′12″W	Weaver, MN	44°05′05″N 92°01′19″W	Beaver, MN
Willow River	Right	76 mi (122 km)		46°40′22″N 93°35′33″W	Waukenabo	47°05′27″N 93°50′43″W	East Cass
Wisconsin River	Left	430 mi (692 km)	12,000 cu ft/s (340 m^{3}/s)	42°59′22″N 91°09′14″W	Prairie du Chein, WI	46°07′13″N 89°09′06″W	Lac Vieux Desert, WI
Wolf River	Left	105 mi (169 km)		35°10′58″N 90°03′24″W	Memphis	34°57′05″N 89°00′24″W	North Tippah School District
Wyaconda River	Right	50 mi (81 km)		40°03′35″N 91°29′45″W	La Grange	40°24′17″N 91°51′42″W	Wyaconda
Yazoo	Left	117 mi (188 km)		32°20′08″N 90°53′50″W	Vicksburg, MS	33°33′07″N 90°10′50″W	Confluence of Tallahatchie and Yalobusha rivers at Greenwood, MS
Yellow River	Right	53 mi (86 km)		43°05′06″N 91°10′52″W	Marquette	43°09′24″N 91°45′19″W	Winneshiek County
Zumbro River	Right	65 mi (104 km)		44°17′30″N 91°55′40″W	Greenfield Township	44°09′11″N 92°28′06″W	Oronoco Township
