= Menominee Township =

Menominee Township may refer to the following places in the United States:

- Menominee Township, Jo Daviess County, Illinois
- Menominee Township, Michigan

See also: Menominee (disambiguation)
