= Menominie =

Menominie is a common misspelling for:

- Menominee
- Menomonee
- Menomonie
