= Menominee (disambiguation) =

The Menominee Indians are a nation of Native Americans.

Menominee can also refer to:

- Menominee language, their language
- College of Menominee Nation, a community college that the tribe founded
- Menominee Indian Reservation, Wisconsin

== Municipalities and administrative divisions ==
- Menominee, Illinois, a village
- Menominee Township, Jo Daviess County, Illinois
- Menominee, Michigan
- Menominee Township, Michigan
- Menominee County, Michigan
- Menominee, Nebraska
- Menomonie, Wisconsin, a town
- Menominee County, Wisconsin

== Land features ==
- Little Menominee River in Wisconsin and Illinois
- Menominee River in Michigan and Wisconsin
- Menominee River (Illinois)

== Vessels ==
- USS Menominee (AT-73), US Navy Navajo-class fleet tug
- Menominee (YTB-790), US Navy Natick-class large harbor tug
- Menominee (YT-807), US Navy Valiant-class harbor tug

== Other ==
- Chief Menominee (c. 1791 – 1841) of the Potawatomi
- Round whitefish, called menominees in parts of the northern Great Lakes

== See also ==
- Menomonee (disambiguation)
- Menomonie (disambiguation)
