= Malkerson Island =

Island in Minnesota, United States

Malkerson
Nickname: Isle of Pines
- Location within Minnesota

Geography
- Location: Bay Lake
- Coordinates: 46°24′05″N 93°51′46″W
- Area: 21.04 ha (52.0 acres)
- Highest elevation: 388 m (1273 ft)

Administration
- United States
- State: Minnesota

Malkerson Island is a private island on Bay Lake, a lake that is located in Bay Lake Township, Crow Wing County, Minnesota. The island is 52 acres (210,000 m^{2}) and has more than three miles (5 km) of shoreline. The island is owned by the Malkerson family and has been used as a summertime weekend retreat for five generations. The island has been featured in the New York Times and Star Tribune.
