= South Two River =

Coordinates: 45.80555°N 94.41298°W

Location
- Country: United States

Physical characteristics
- Source
  - location: Minnesota

The South Two River is a 22.8-mile-long (36.7 km) tributary of the Two River of Minnesota, United States. It is part of the Mississippi River watershed.

The South Two River rises east of Albany at the outlet of Schwinghamer Lake and flows northeast past Holdingford. Near Bowlus it joins the North Two River to form the Two River, which continues 5.6 miles (9.0 km) to the Mississippi.

== See also ==
- List of rivers of Minnesota
