= North Prairie =

North Prairie is the name of the following places in the United States of America:

- North Prairie, Minnesota
- North Prairie, Wisconsin
- North Prairie Township, North Dakota
