= North Two River =

Coordinates: 45.80566°N 94.41312°W

Location
- Country: United States

Physical characteristics
- Source
  - location: Minnesota

The North Two River is a 22.4-mile-long (36.0 km) tributary of the Two River in central Minnesota. It is part of the Mississippi River watershed.

The North Two River begins in eastern Todd County at the outlet of Mary Lake and flows east into Morrison County, where it passes the towns of Upsala and Elmdale before ending south of Bowlus, where it joins the South Two River to form the Two River.

== See also ==
- List of rivers of Minnesota
