= Menomonie =

Menomonie can refer to:

United States

- Menomonie, Wisconsin
- Menomonie (town), Wisconsin
- Menomonie High School
- Menomonie Municipal Airport
- Menomonie Blue Devils, a nickname for the sports teams of University of Wisconsin–Stout

== See also ==
- Menominee (disambiguation)
- Menomonee (disambiguation)
