= North Prairie, Minnesota =

- Unincorporated community
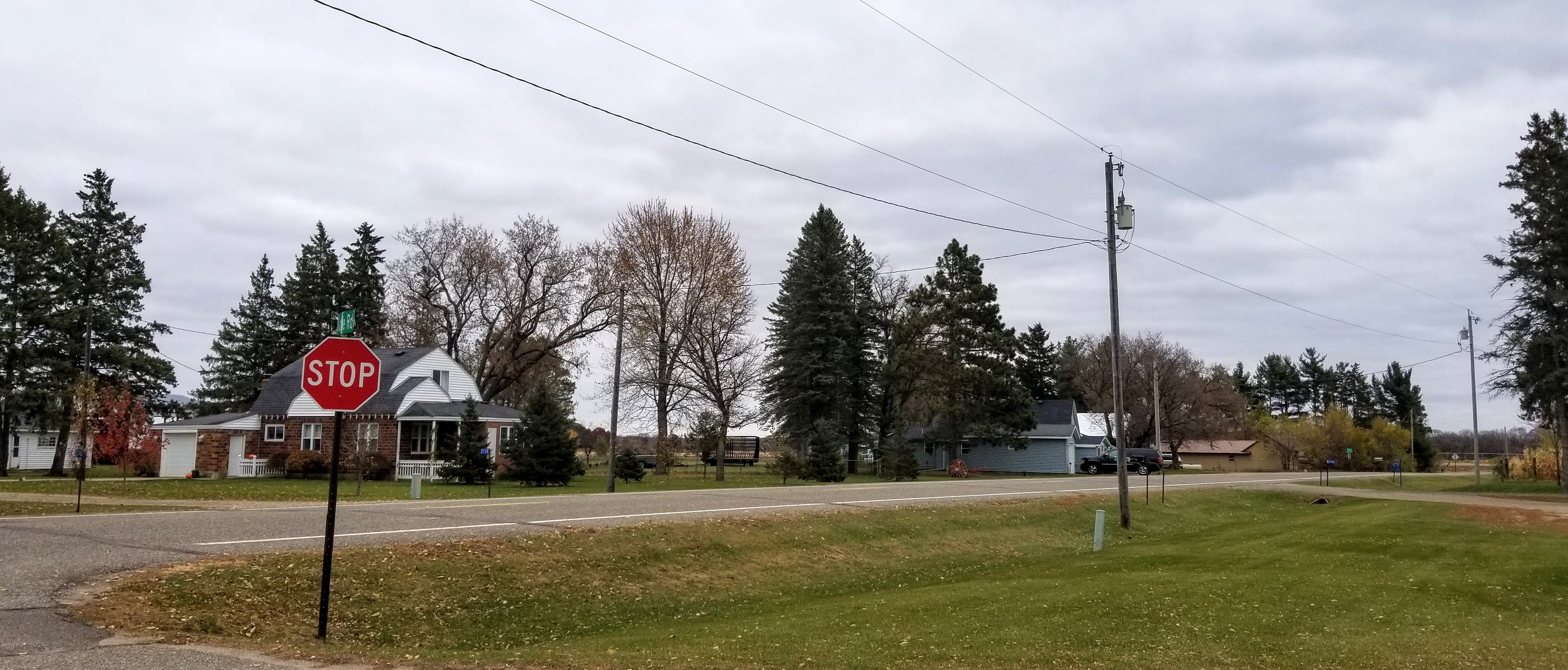
- Homes in North Prairie

- Location within Minnesota Location within the United States
- Coordinates: 45°48′03″N 94°20′58″W
- Country: United States
- State: Minnesota
- County: Morrison
- Township: Two Rivers
- Elevation: 1,083 ft (330 m)
- Time zone: UTC-6 (Central (CST))
  - Summer (DST): UTC-5 (CDT)
- ZIP code: 56314
- Area code: 320
- GNIS feature ID: 648678

North Prairie is an unincorporated community in Two Rivers Township, Morrison County, Minnesota, United States. The community is located along Morrison County Road 21 near Gable Road. Nearby places include Bowlus and Royalton. The Mississippi River is nearby.

North Prairie was platted in 1885.

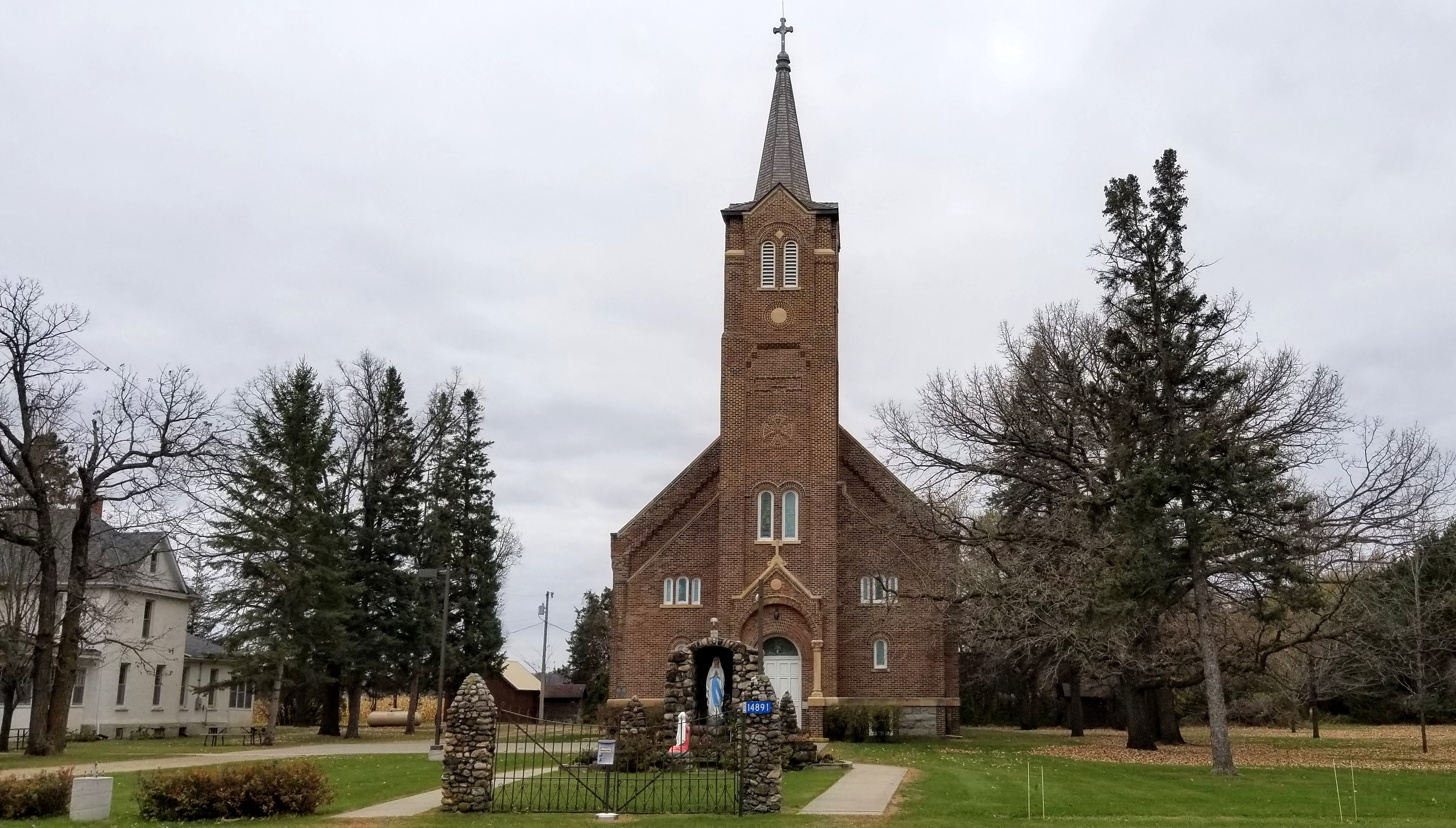
Holy Cross Catholic Church
