= Bay Lake (Minnesota) =

Lake in the state of Minnesota, United States

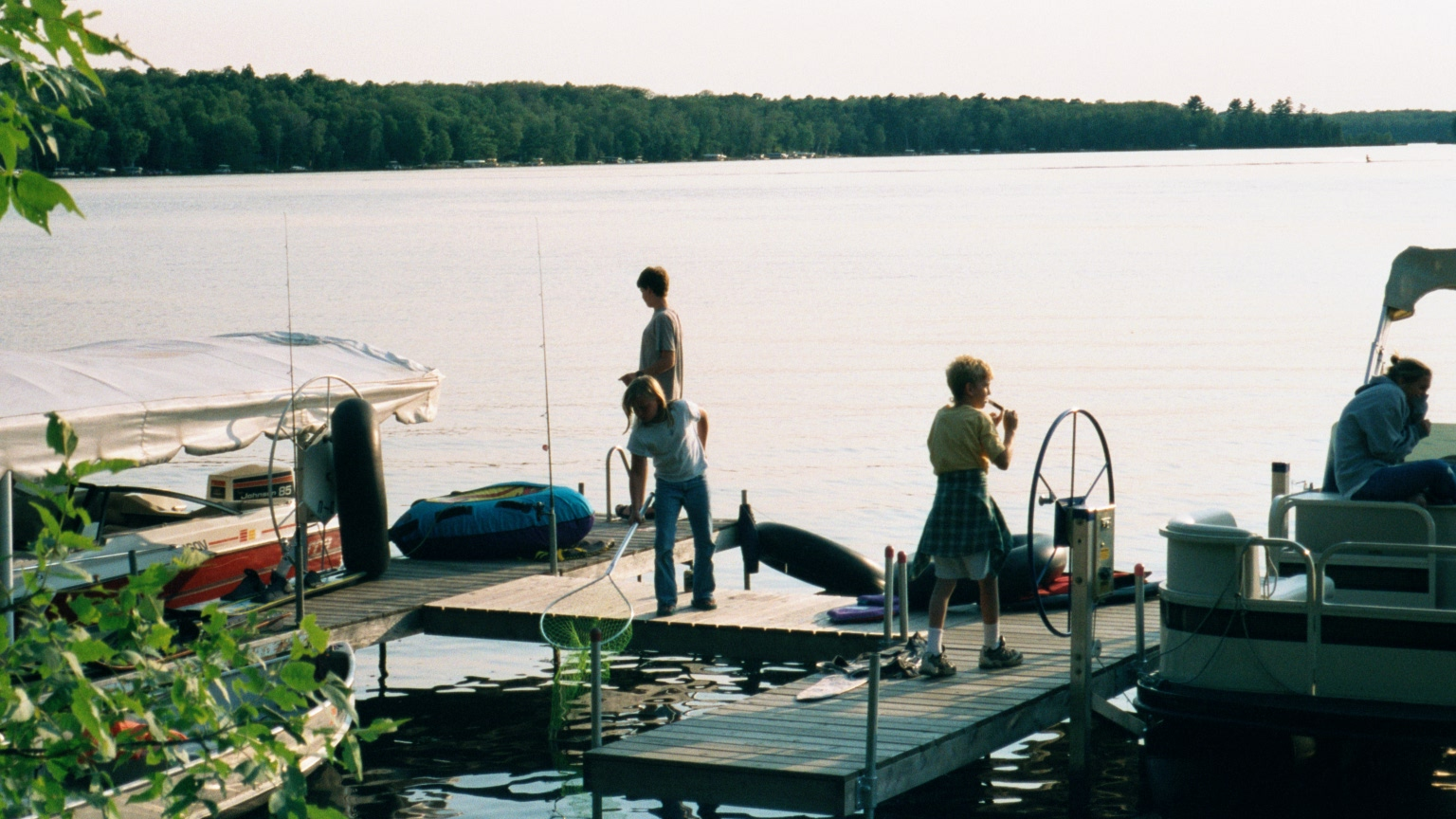
- Typical scene

- Location within Minnesota
- Location: Crow Wing County, Minnesota
- Coordinates: 46.385425°N 93.856544°W
- Catchment area: 23 sq mi (60 km^{2})
- Basin countries: United States
- Surface area: 2,393 acres (9.68 km^{2})
- Max. depth: 74 ft (23 m)
- Residence time: 4-7 years
- Islands: Malkerson Island; Church Island
- Settlements: Bay Lake

Bay Lake is a body of water located in the Brainerd Lakes region of Minnesota. The lake has a surface area of 2,319.84 acres (9 km^{2}) and approximately 19 miles (31 km) of shoreline. The maximum depth of the lake is 74 feet (23 m) with a water clarity of 10 feet (3 m). The Ojibway called the lake Ses-sa-beg-a-mah, which has been translated as "lake of many bays" or "lake of many arms."

Bay Lake is located within Bay Lake Township, approximately 15 miles (24 km) east of Brainerd, Minnesota and five miles (8 km) northwest of Garrison, Minnesota. Like many other lakes in the area, Bay Lake is surrounded by commercial resorts and private cabins, and is a popular destination for fishing, boating, and water skiing. Access to the lake and resorts is via Minnesota State Highway 6 for the western shore and Crow Wing County Highway 10 for the eastern shore.

There are three islands on the lake. The largest of these, the 72-acre (290,000 m^{2}) Church Island, is used as a Lutheran church camp. Outdoor services, open to the public, are held on the island each Sunday during the summer.

Bay Lake is part of the headwaters for the Ripple River, and the river is common spawning spot for fish.

== See also ==
- List of lakes in Minnesota
