= Riverton, Minnesota =

City in Minnesota, United States

Riverton
- City
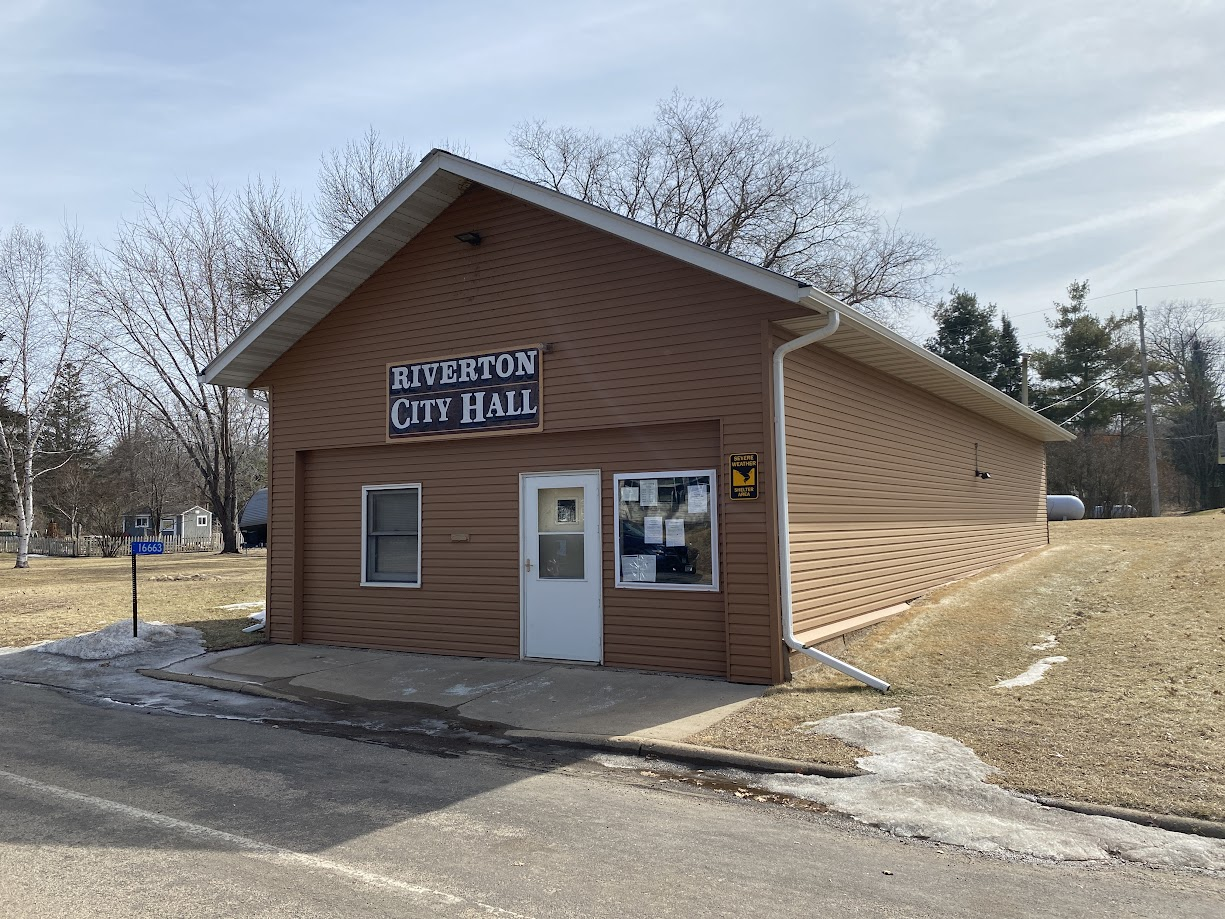
- City hall of Riverton

- Location of Riverton within Crow Wing County, Minnesota
- Coordinates: 46°27′30″N 94°02′55″W
- Country: United States
- State: Minnesota
- County: Crow Wing

Area
  - Total: 0.90 sq mi (2.33 km^{2})
  - Land: 0.81 sq mi (2.10 km^{2})
  - Water: 0.089 sq mi (0.23 km^{2})
- Elevation: 1,230 ft (370 m)

Population (2020)
  - Total: 118
  - Density: 145.7/sq mi (56.24/km^{2})
- Time zone: UTC-6 (Central (CST))
  - Summer (DST): UTC-5 (CDT)
- ZIP code: 56455
- Area code: 218
- FIPS code: 27-54736
- GNIS feature ID: 2396386

Riverton is a city in Crow Wing County, Minnesota, United States. As of the 2020 census, Riverton had a population of 118. It is part of the Brainerd Micropolitan Statistical Area.

Riverton is located between Brainerd and Ironton, where the Mississippi River flows past the western end of the Cuyuna iron range.

== History ==
In 1855, the Rabbit Lake Indian Reservation for the Rabbit Lake Band of Mississippi Chippewa was established in the area by the Treaty of Washington also known as the Treaty with the Chippewa (10 Stat. 1165). Soon afterwards, a village of Ojibway (or Ogibeway) was established at the mouth of Rabbit River. However, maps from the 1860s depict the village of Ojibway instead located either at the mouth of the Cedar River or at the mouth of the Ripple River.

Riverton was incorporated in 1912. A post office called Riverton was established in 1913, and remained in operation until it was discontinued in 1965. The city was named from its location near the Rabbit River.

== Geography ==
According to the United States Census Bureau, the city has a total area of 0.85 square miles (2.20 km^{2}), of which 0.77 square miles (1.99 km^{2}) is land and 0.08 square miles (0.21 km^{2}) is water. County Roads 59 and 128 are the main routes in the community. Minnesota State Highway 210 is nearby.

== Demographics ==
Historical population
Census	Pop.	Note	%±
1920	398		—
1930	168		−57.8%
1940	141		−16.1%
1950	148		5.0%
1960	121		−18.2%
1970	103		−14.9%
1980	112		8.7%
1990	122		8.9%
2000	115		−5.7%
2010	117		1.7%
2020	118		0.9%
U.S. Decennial Census

=== 2010 census ===
As of the census of 2010, there were 117 people, 48 households, and 30 families living in the city. The population density was 151.9 inhabitants per square mile (58.6/km^{2}). There were 61 housing units at an average density of 79.2 per square mile (30.6/km^{2}). The racial makeup of the city was 98.3% White and 1.7% Native American. Hispanic or Latino of any race were 0.9% of the population.

There were 48 households, of which 31.3% had children under the age of 18 living with them, 47.9% were married couples living together, 10.4% had a female householder with no husband present, 4.2% had a male householder with no wife present, and 37.5% were non-families. 31.3% of all households were made up of individuals, and 4.2% had someone living alone who was 65 years of age or older. The average household size was 2.44 and the average family size was 3.03.

The median age in the city was 42.2 years. 24.8% of residents were under the age of 18; 8.5% were between the ages of 18 and 24; 22.2% were from 25 to 44; 30.8% were from 45 to 64; and 13.7% were 65 years of age or older. The gender makeup of the city was 50.4% male and 49.6% female.

=== 2000 census ===
As of the census of 2000, there were 115 people, 51 households, and 29 families living in the city. The population density was 146.5 inhabitants per square mile (56.6/km^{2}). There were 61 housing units at an average density of 77.7 per square mile (30.0/km^{2}). The racial makeup of the city was 99.13% White and 0.87% Native American. Hispanic or Latino of any race were 0.87% of the population. 29.4% were of Norwegian, 25.9% German, 17.6% Swedish and 9.4% American ancestry according to Census 2000.

There were 51 households, out of which 25.5% had children under the age of 18 living with them, 45.1% were married couples living together, 7.8% had a female householder with no husband present, and 43.1% were non-families. 33.3% of all households were made up of individuals, and 9.8% had someone living alone who was 65 years of age or older. The average household size was 2.25 and the average family size was 2.93.

In the city, the population was spread out, with 22.6% under the age of 18, 8.7% from 18 to 24, 27.8% from 25 to 44, 29.6% from 45 to 64, and 11.3% who were 65 years of age or older. The median age was 38 years. For every 100 females, there were 98.3 males. For every 100 females age 18 and over, there were 102.3 males.

The median income for a household in the city was $35,000, and the median income for a family was $38,250. Males had a median income of $30,625 versus $17,321 for females. The per capita income for the city was $19,406. There were 4.0% of families and 8.0% of the population living below the poverty line, including 11.1% of under eighteens and 40.0% of those over 64.
