= Two Rivers Township, Morrison County, Minnesota =

Two Rivers Township, Minnesota
- Township
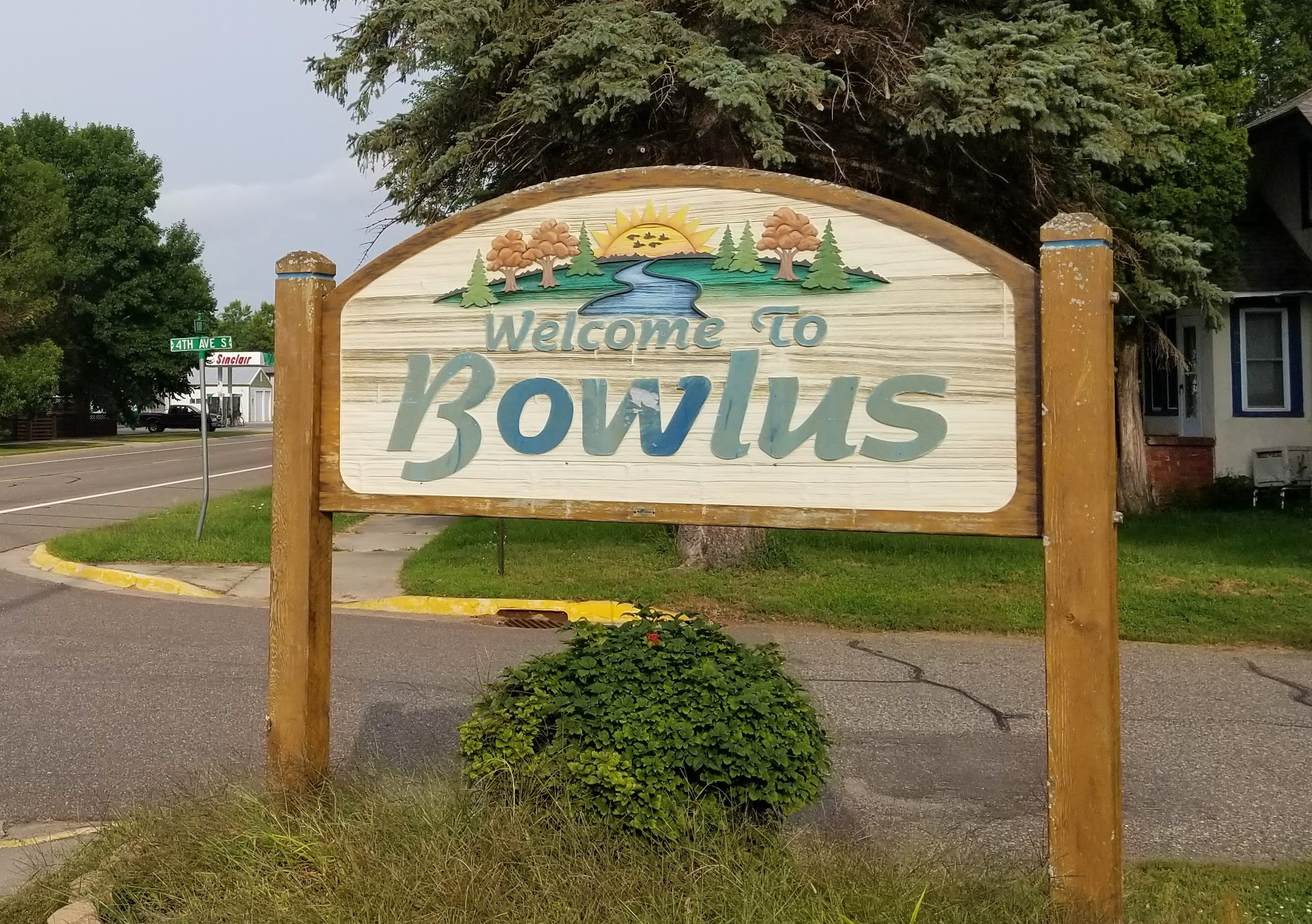
- Bowlus a city in Two Rivers Township

- Location within the state of Minnesota Two Rivers Township, Minnesota (the United States)
- Coordinates: 45°49′N 94°23′W
- Country: United States
- State: Minnesota
- County: Morrison

Area
  - Total: 27.6 sq mi (71.4 km^{2})
  - Land: 27.1 sq mi (70.2 km^{2})
  - Water: 0.50 sq mi (1.3 km^{2})
- Elevation: 1,120 ft (340 m)

Population (2000)
  - Total: 582
  - Density: 21/sq mi (8.3/km^{2})
- Time zone: UTC-6 (Central (CST))
  - Summer (DST): UTC-5 (CDT)
- FIPS code: 27-66028
- GNIS feature ID: 0665829

Two Rivers Township is a township in Morrison County, Minnesota, United States. The population was 780 at the 2020 census.

== History ==
Two Rivers Township was organized September 5, 1865. It was first named Grant Township but when the name was sent to the State Auditor it was found that a Washington County town already had that name. The name was then changed to Two Rivers, named for the Two River a Mississippi River tributary in Morrison County.

== Geography ==
According to the United States Census Bureau, the township has a total area of 27.6 square miles (71.4 km^{2}), of which 27.1 square miles (70.2 km^{2}) is land and 0.5 square mile (1.2 km^{2}) (1.74%) is water.

State Highway 238; and Morrison County Roads 21, 24, 25, and 26 are five of the main routes in the township.

The unincorporated community of North Prairie is located within the township.

The city of Bowlus is located within Two Rivers Township geographically but is a separate entity.

== Demographics ==
As of the census of 2000, there were 582 people, 192 households, and 150 families residing in the township. The population density was 21.5 people per square mile (8.3/km^{2}). There were 201 housing units at an average density of 7.4/sq mi (2.9/km^{2}). The racial makeup of the township was 99.14% White, 0.17% African American, 0.17% Native American, 0.17% Asian, and 0.34% from two or more races. Hispanic or Latino of any race were 0.52% of the population.

There were 192 households, out of which 40.1% had children under the age of 18 living with them, 69.3% were married couples living together, 2.6% had a female householder with no husband present, and 21.4% were non-families. 18.2% of all households were made up of individuals, and 6.3% had someone living alone who was 65 years of age or older. The average household size was 3.03 and the average family size was 3.52.

In the township the population was spread out, with 29.2% under the age of 18, 11.5% from 18 to 24, 29.7% from 25 to 44, 20.3% from 45 to 64, and 9.3% who were 65 years of age or older. The median age was 32 years. For every 100 females, there were 129.1 males. For every 100 females age 18 and over, there were 127.6 males.

The median income for a household in the township was $47,656, and the median income for a family was $50,000. Males had a median income of $33,000 versus $19,464 for females. The per capita income for the township was $19,067. About 4.8% of families and 5.5% of the population were below the poverty line, including 3.8% of those under age 18 and 17.4% of those age 65 or over.
