= Menominee (YTB-790) =

Tugboat of the United States Navy

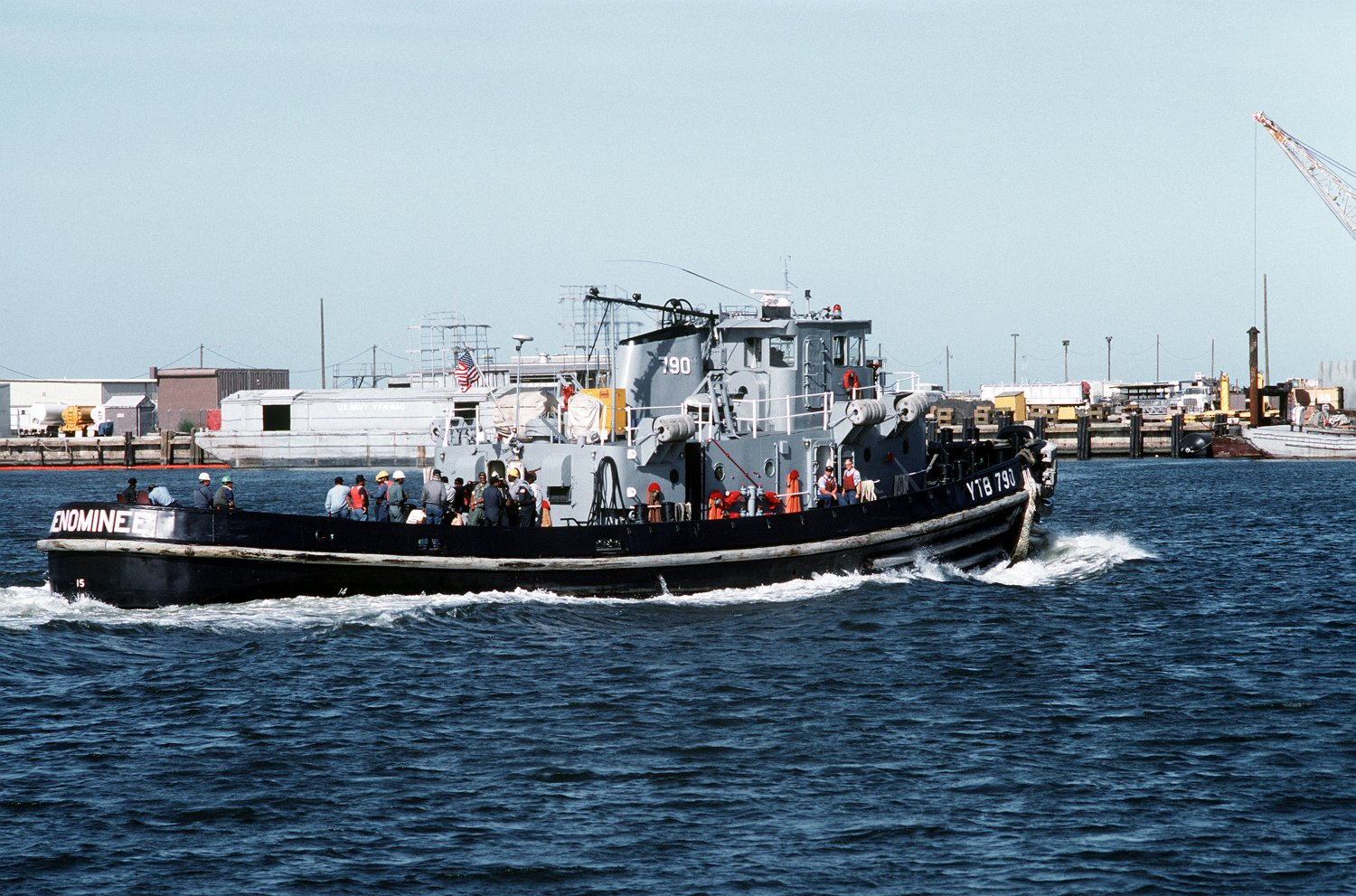
- Menominee (YTB-790) underway off Naval Air Station Norfolk, 16 June 1992.

History

United States
- Namesake: Menominee
- Ordered: 16 June 1966
- Builder: Marinette Marine, Marinette, Wisconsin
- Laid down: 6 September 1966
- Launched: 3 April 1967
- Acquired: 10 June 1967
- In service: 10 June 1967
- Stricken: 4 September 1998
- Identification: IMO number: 8980854; MMSI number: 373339000; Callsign: HP2685
- Fate: Sold into commercial service

General characteristics
- Class & type: Natick-class large harbor tug
- Displacement: 283 long tons (288 t) (light); 356 long tons (362 t) (full)
- Length: 109 ft (33 m)
- Beam: 31 ft (9.4 m)
- Draft: 14 ft (4.3 m)
- Speed: 12 knots (14 mph; 22 km/h)
- Complement: 12
- Armament: None

Menominee (YTB‑790) was a United States Navy Natick-class large harbor tug named after the Menominee, a Native American tribe in Wisconsin.

== Construction ==
The contract for Menominee was awarded 31 January 1964. She was laid down on 6 September 1966 at Marinette, Wisconsin, by Marinette Marine and launched 3 April 1967.

== Operational history ==
Menominee has performed miscellaneous tugging services for the 5th Naval District, headquartered at Norfolk, Virginia. In the spring of 1971 she was reassigned to Naval Station Mayport, Florida.

Stricken from the Navy Directory 4 September 1998, she was disposed of by Defense Reutilization and Marketing Service (DRMS) by sale for reuse/conversion 27 September 2000. Currently in civilian service as Billy G.
