= Menomonee =

Menomonee can refer to:

United States

- Little Menomonee River in Ozaukee and Milwaukee counties, Wisconsin
- Menomonee, Wisconsin, former town
- Menomonee Falls, Wisconsin, village
- Menomonee River in Washington, Waukesha, and Milwaukee counties in Wisconsin
- Menomonee River Valley, Milwaukee
- Menomonee (sculpture), a public artwork by Hilary Goldblatt in Milwaukee, Wisconsin

== See also ==
- Menominee (disambiguation)
- Menomonie (disambiguation)
