= Rabbit River (Mississippi River tributary) =

Coordinates: 46°27′41″N 94°03′51″W

Location
- Country: United States

Physical characteristics
- Source
  - location: Minnesota

The Rabbit River is an 8.6-mile-long (13.8 km) tributary of the Mississippi River in northern Minnesota, United States. It rises at the outlet of Rabbit Lake, north of Crosby, and flows southwest through a chain of lakes past Ironton, joining the Mississippi River at the outlet of Little Rabbit Lake northwest of Riverton.

== See also ==
- List of rivers of Minnesota
