= Menominee Township, Michigan =

- Civil township
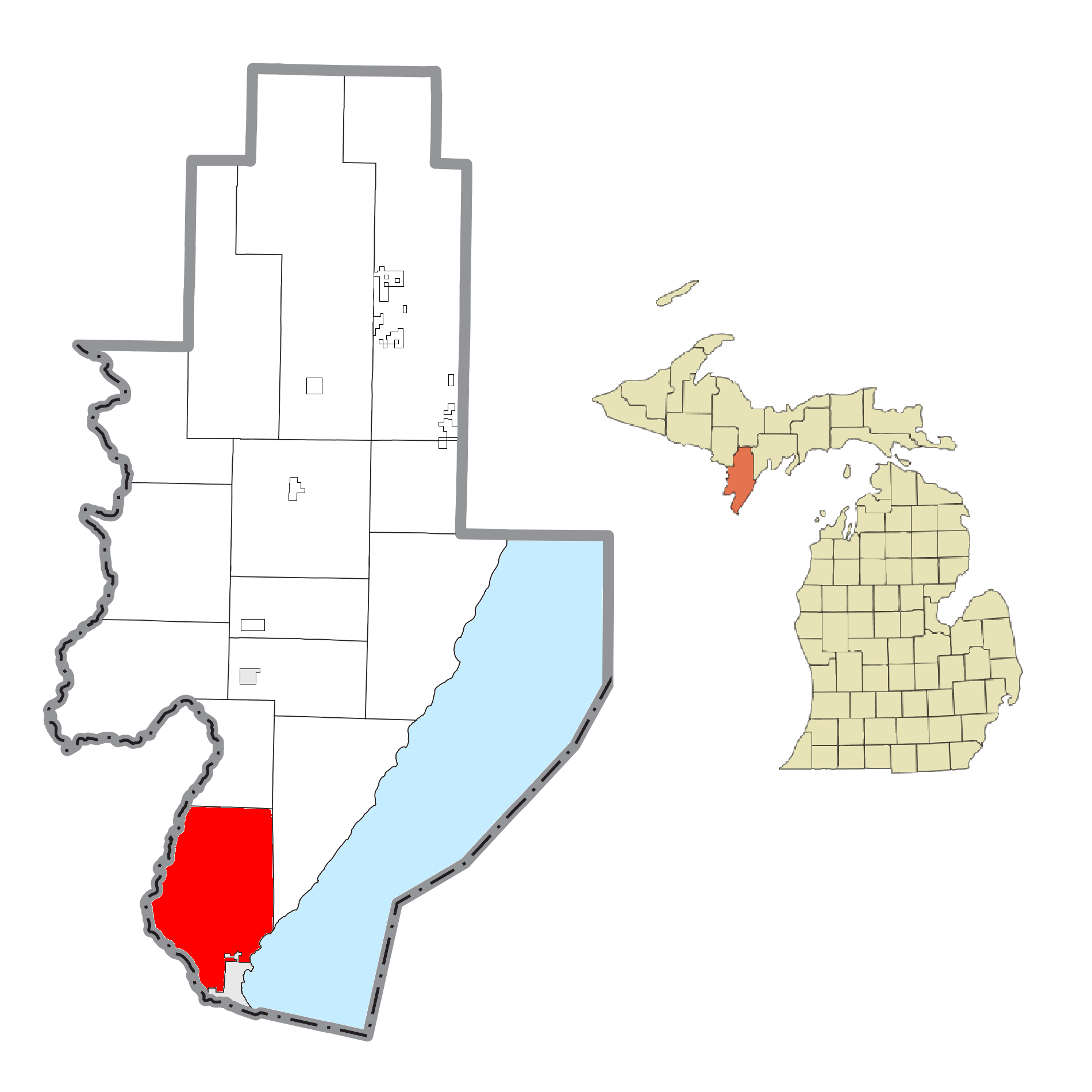
- Location within Menominee County and the state of Michigan

- Location within Michigan Location within the United States
- Coordinates: 45°11′45″N 87°38′02″W
- Country: United States
- State: Michigan
- County: Menominee
- Organized: 1863

Government
  - Supervisor: Kenneth Goffin

Area
  - Total: 73.45 sq mi (190.2 km^{2})
  - Land: 72.70 sq mi (188.3 km^{2})
  - Water: 0.75 sq mi (1.9 km^{2})
- Elevation: 646 ft (197 m)

Population (2020)
  - Total: 3,364
  - Density: 46.3/sq mi (17.9/km^{2})
- Time zone: UTC-6 (Central (CST))
  - Summer (DST): UTC-5 (CDT)
- ZIP Codes: 49858 (Menominee); 49893 (Wallace)
- Area code: 906
- FIPS code: 26-109-53040
- GNIS feature ID: 1626724
- Website: www.menomineetownship.com

Menominee Township is a civil township of Menominee County in the U.S. state of Michigan. The population was 3,364 at the 2020 census, down from a peak of 4,026 in 1980. The city of Menominee borders the southern end of the township but is administratively autonomous.

== Geography ==
The township is in southern Menominee County, bordered to the south by Menominee, the county seat; to the southeast by Green Bay (Lake Michigan); and to the west, across the Menominee River, by Marinette County, Wisconsin. U.S. Route 41 crosses the township, leading south into Menominee and north to Stephenson, while M-35 runs along the Lake Michigan shoreline, leading northeast to Escanaba.

According to the United States Census Bureau, Menominee Township has a total area of 73.4 square miles (190 km^{2}), of which 72.7 square miles (188 km^{2}) are land and 0.8 square miles (2.1 km^{2}), or 1.02%, are water.

== Demographics ==
Historical population
Census	Pop.	Note	%±
1890	1,566		—
1900	1,290		−17.6%
1910	1,405		8.9%
1920	1,428		1.6%
1930	1,534		7.4%
1940	1,760		14.7%
1950	2,097		19.1%
1960	2,670		27.3%
1970	3,212		20.3%
1980	4,026		25.3%
1990	3,956		−1.7%
2000	3,939		−0.4%
2010	3,488		−11.4%
2020	3,364		−3.6%
U.S. Decennial Census

As of the census of 2000, there were 3,939 people, 1,570 households, and 1,169 families residing in the township. By 2020, its population was 3,364.
