= Menominee, Illinois =

Menominee
- Village
- Location of Menominee in Jo Daviess County, Illinois
- Coordinates: 42°28′29″N 90°32′34″W
- Country: United States
- State: Illinois
- County: Jo Daviess
- Township: Menominee

Area
  - Total: 1.92 sq mi (4.96 km^{2})
  - Land: 1.92 sq mi (4.96 km^{2})
  - Water: 0 sq mi (0 km^{2})
- Elevation: 804 ft (245 m)

Population (2020)
  - Total: 211
  - Density: 110.3/sq mi (42.57/km^{2})
- Time zone: UTC-6 (CST)
  - Summer (DST): UTC-5 (CDT)
- ZIP code: 61025
- Area code: 815
- FIPS code: 17-48359
- GNIS feature ID: 2399315

Menominee is a village in Jo Daviess County, Illinois, United States. The population was 211 at the 2020 census. The village is located on the Little Menominee River near East Dubuque and Galena.

The village derives its name from the Menominee indigenous peoples.

== Geography ==
According to the 2021 census gazetteer files, Menominee has a total area of 1.91 square miles (4.95 km^{2}), all land.

== Demographics ==
Historical population
Census	Pop.	Note	%±
1940	138		—
1950	132		−4.3%
1960	191		44.7%
1970	217		13.6%
1980	231		6.5%
1990	187		−19.0%
2000	237		26.7%
2010	248		4.6%
2020	211		−14.9%
U.S. Decennial Census

As of the 2020 census there were 211 people, 106 households, and 79 families residing in the village. The population density was 110.24 inhabitants per square mile (42.56/km^{2}). There were 91 housing units at an average density of 47.54 per square mile (18.36/km^{2}). The racial makeup of the village was 82.94% White, 0.00% African American, 0.00% Native American, 0.00% Asian, 0.00% Pacific Islander, 9.00% from other races, and 8.06% from two or more races. Hispanic or Latino of any race were 15.17% of the population.

There were 106 households, out of which 51.9% had children under the age of 18 living with them, 73.58% were married couples living together, 0.00% had a female householder with no husband present, and 25.47% were non-families. 24.53% of all households were made up of individuals, and 12.26% had someone living alone who was 65 years of age or older. The average household size was 2.65 and the average family size was 2.24.

The village's age distribution consisted of 21.5% under the age of 18, 3.0% from 18 to 24, 15.1% from 25 to 44, 46.9% from 45 to 64, and 13.5% who were 65 years of age or older. The median age was 53.4 years. For every 100 females, there were 80.9 males. For every 100 females age 18 and over, there were 95.8 males.

The median income for a household in the village was $95,000, and the median income for a family was $154,375. Males had a median income of $50,893 versus $21,653 for females. The per capita income for the village was $38,157. No families and 0.8% of the population were below the poverty line, including none of those under age 18 and none of those age 65 or over.
