= Bay Lake Township, Crow Wing County, Minnesota =

Township in Minnesota, United States

Bay Lake Township
- Township
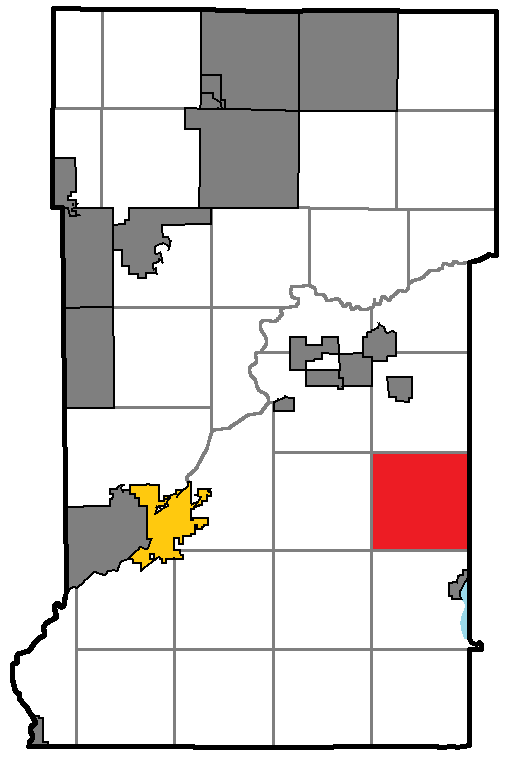
- Location of Bay Lake Township, within Crow Wing County, Minnesota
- Coordinates: 46°22′35″N 93°52′20″W
- Country: United States
- State: Minnesota
- County: Crow Wing

Area
  - Total: 36.3 sq mi (93.9 km^{2})
  - Land: 27.0 sq mi (70.0 km^{2})
  - Water: 9.2 sq mi (23.9 km^{2})
- Elevation: 1,266 ft (386 m)

Population (2020)
  - Total: 921
  - Density: 34.1/sq mi (13.2/km^{2})
- Time zone: UTC-6 (Central (CST))
  - Summer (DST): UTC-5 (CDT)
- FIPS code: 27-04096
- GNIS feature ID: 0663527
- Website: https://baylaketownship.org/

Bay Lake Township is a township in Crow Wing County, Minnesota, United States. The population was 921 at the 2020 census. This township took its name from Bay Lake.

Minnesota Highway 6 and Minnesota Highway 18 are two of the main arterial routes in the township.

== Geography ==
According to the United States Census Bureau, the township has a total area of 36.3 square miles (94 km^{2}), of which 27.0 square miles (70 km^{2}) is land and 9.2 square miles (24 km^{2}) (25.48%) is water. The township encompasses Bay Lake, as well as several smaller lakes.

== Demographics ==
As of the census of 2000, there were 923 people, 421 households, and 306 families residing in the township. The population density was 34.2 inhabitants per square mile (13.2/km^{2}). There were 1,335 housing units at an average density of 49.4 per square mile (19.1/km^{2}). The racial makeup of the township was 98.48% White, 0.65% Native American, 0.11% Asian, and 0.76% from two or more races. Hispanic or Latino of any race were 0.43% of the population.

There were 421 households, out of which 16.9% had children under the age of 18 living with them, 67.9% were married couples living together, 2.4% had a female householder with no husband present, and 27.1% were non-families. 24.5% of all households were made up of individuals, and 10.7% had someone living alone who was 65 years of age or older. The average household size was 2.19 and the average family size was 2.59.

In the township the population was spread out, with 17.1% under the age of 18, 1.6% from 18 to 24, 17.0% from 25 to 44, 37.7% from 45 to 64, and 26.5% who were 65 years of age or older. The median age was 55 years. For every 100 females, there were 98.5 males. For every 100 females age 18 and over, there were 101.8 males.

The median income for a household in the township was $42,596, and the median income for a family was $48,558. Males had a median income of $36,250 versus $26,563 for females. The per capita income for the township was $26,194. About 6.3% of families and 7.9% of the population were below the poverty line, including 14.5% of those under age 18 and 6.6% of those age 65 or over.
