= Two River (Mississippi River tributary) =

Coordinates: 45.82501°N 94.35707°W

Location
- Country: United States

Physical characteristics
- Source
  - location: Minnesota

The Two River is a 5.6-mile-long (9.0 km) tributary of the Mississippi River in Morrison County, Minnesota, United States. It is formed by the confluence of the North Two River and South Two River south of Bowlus, Minnesota.

Two River is an English translation of the native Ojibwe language name.

== See also ==
- List of rivers of Minnesota
