= Ripple River =

Coordinates: 46°32′30″N 93°42′01″W

Location
- Country: United States

Physical characteristics
- Source
  - location: Eastern Crow Wing County, Minnesota
  - elevation: Approximately 1280 ft.
- Mouth
  - location: Mississippi River in Aitkin County, Minnesota
  - elevation: Approximately 1180 ft.

The Ripple River is a small river of north-central Minnesota. The stream headwaters are at the outlet of Bay Lake of eastern Crow Wing County and it flows east and north to its confluence with the Mississippi River on the north side of Aitkin in Aitkin County. The river follows a circuitous route, with a total stream length of 42.3 miles (68.1 km); while the direct distance between its source and mouth is approximately 10 miles (16 km).

== See also ==
- List of rivers of Minnesota
