= Bowlus, Minnesota =

City in Minnesota, United States

- City
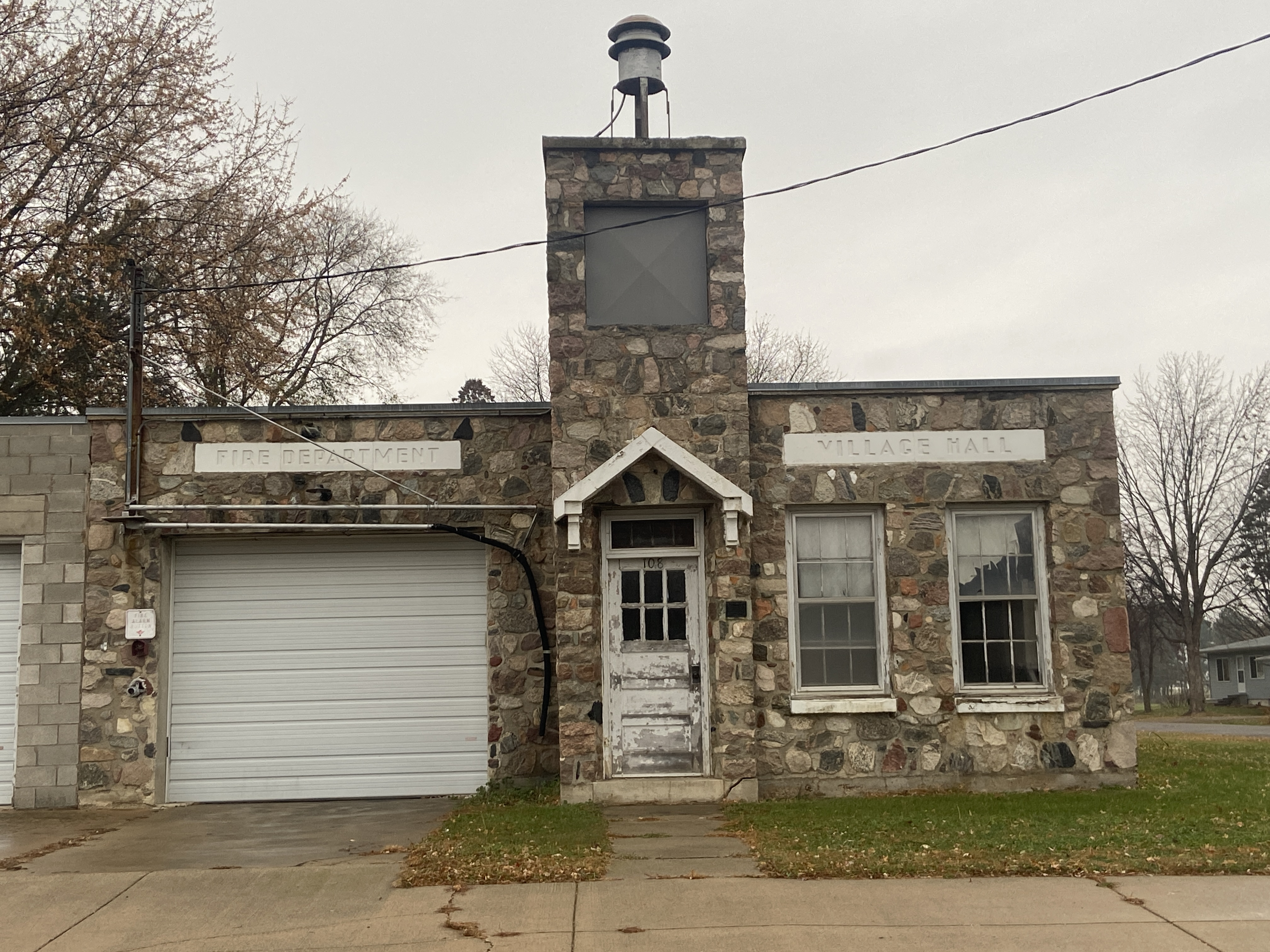
- Old Village Hall

- Location in Morrison County and the state of Minnesota
- Coordinates: 45°49′09″N 94°24′26″W
- Country: United States
- State: Minnesota
- County: Morrison

Area
  - Total: 1.28 sq mi (3.31 km^{2})
  - Land: 1.28 sq mi (3.31 km^{2})
  - Water: 0 sq mi (0.00 km^{2})
- Elevation: 1,112 ft (339 m)

Population (2020)
  - Total: 279
  - Density: 218.2/sq mi (84.25/km^{2})
- Time zone: UTC-6 (Central (CST))
  - Summer (DST): UTC-5 (CDT)
- ZIP code: 56314
- Area code: 320
- FIPS code: 27-07066
- GNIS feature ID: 2394229
- Website: cityofbowlus.com

Bowlus (/ˈboʊləs/ BOH-ləss is a city in Morrison County, Minnesota, United States. The population was 279 at the 2020 census.

== History ==
Many of the early settlers in the Bowlus area came from Silesia in Poland. Bowlus was platted in 1907 and named by officers of the Minneapolis, St. Paul and Sault Ste. Marie Railroad. A post office has been in operation since 1907. Bowlus was incorporated as a village in September 1908 and separated from the Two Rivers Township in February 1919.

Heavy stands of oak, maple, elm and white pine trees made lumbering a significant economic force in Bowlus's early history, including a sawmill, lumberyard, and barrel factory. The Bowlus Brick & Tile Co. was organized to extract the laminated clay the Two River deposited in the area.

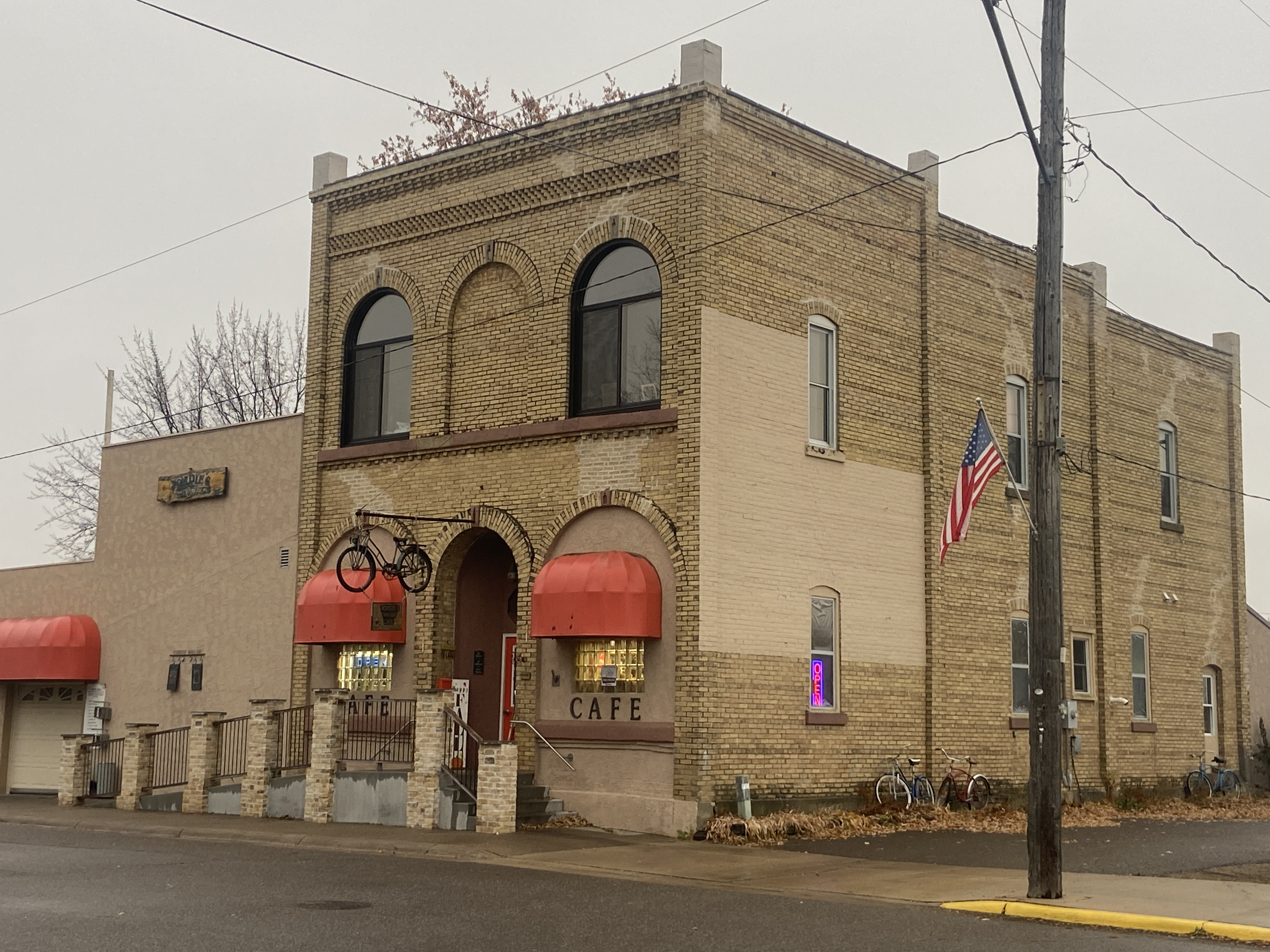
Cafe

== Geography ==
Bowlus is in southwestern Morrison County and is surrounded by Two Rivers Township. It is 3 miles (5 km) west of the Mississippi River, 5 miles (8 km) east of Elmdale, with which it shares the ZIP Code 56314, and 13 miles (21 km) south of Little Falls, the Morrison county seat.

According to the U.S. Census Bureau, Bowlus has an area of 1.28 square miles (3.32 km^{2}), all of it recorded as land. The Two River, a direct tributary of the Mississippi, flows northeasterly across the southeast corner of the city.

Morrison County Roads 24 and 26; State Highway 238; and Main Street are four of the community's main routes.

Bowlus has a fire department, a medical squad, two cafes, a bar, a church, and two gasoline stations.

== Demographics ==
Historical population
Census	Pop.	Note	%±
1910	164		—
1920	247		50.6%
1930	266		7.7%
1940	304		14.3%
1950	233		−23.4%
1960	263		12.9%
1970	268		1.9%
1980	276		3.0%
1990	260		−5.8%
2000	260		0.0%
2010	290		11.5%
2020	279		−3.8%
U.S. Decennial Census

=== 2010 census ===
At the 2010 census there were 290 people, 114 households and 79 families residing in Bowlus. The population density was 232.0 per square mile (89.6/km^{2}). There were 122 housing units at an average density of 97.6 per square mile (37.7/km^{2}). The racial make-up was 98.3% White, 0.3% African American, 0.3% Native American, and 1.0% from two or more races.

There were 114 households, of which 33.3% had children under the age of 18 living with them, 52.6% were married couples living together, 10.5% had a female householder with no husband present, 6.1% had a male householder with no wife present, and 30.7% were non-families. 21.9% of all households were made up of individuals, and 8.7% had someone living alone who was 65 years of age or older. The average household size was 2.54 and the average family size was 2.89.

The median age was 33 years. 24.1% of residents were under the age of 18, 9% were between the ages of 18 and 24, 29.3% were from 25 to 44, 22.1% were from 45 to 64 and 15.5% were 65 years of age or older. The sexual makeup was 55.2% male and 44.8% female.

=== 2000 census ===
At the 2000 census, there were 260 people, 105 households and 74 families residing in Bowlus. The population density was 208.2 per square mile (80.4/km^{2}). There were 111 housing units at an average density of 88.9 per square mile (34.3/km^{2}). The racial make-up was 100.00% White.

There were 105 households, of which 29.5% had children under the age of 18 living with them, 60.0% were married couples living together, 4.8% had a female householder with no husband present, and 28.6% were non-families. 25.7% of all households were made up of individuals and 13.3% had someone living alone who was 65 years of age or older. The average household size was 2.48 and the average family size was 2.96.

25.0% of the population were under the age of 18, 10.0% from 18 to 24, 28.8% from 25 to 44, 21.2% from 45 to 64 and 15.0% who were 65 years of age or older. The median age was 35 years. For every 100 females, there were 111.4 males. For every 100 females age 18 and over, there were 105.3 males.

The median household income was $32,222 and the median family income was $41,563. Males had a median income of $25,104 and females $24,063. The per capita income was $13,868. About 6.2% of families and 10.3% of the population were below the poverty line, including none of those under the age of eighteen and 46.0% of those 65 or over.

== Bowlus Fun Day ==
Also known as Bowlus Days, Bowlus Fun Day is a townwide event on the first Sunday of July sponsored by the local fire department. It has attracted up to 1,000 visitors for 30 years.
