= Menominee Township, Illinois =

Menominee Township
- Township
- Location in Jo Daviess County

- Jo Daviess County's location in Illinois
- Coordinates: 42°27′52″N 90°32′08″W
- Country: United States
- State: Illinois
- County: Jo Daviess
- Established: November 2, 1852

Government
  - Supervisor: Delbert Schulting

Area
  - Total: 30.36 sq mi (78.6 km^{2})
  - Land: 27.94 sq mi (72.4 km^{2})
  - Water: 2.42 sq mi (6.3 km^{2}) 7.98%
- Elevation: 761 ft (232 m)

Population (2020)
  - Total: 1,035
  - Density: 37.04/sq mi (14.30/km^{2})
- Time zone: UTC-6 (CST)
  - Summer (DST): UTC-5 (CDT)
- ZIP codes: 61025, 61036
- FIPS code: 17-085-48372

Menominee Township is one of 23 townships in Jo Daviess County, Illinois, United States. As of the 2020 census, its population was 1,035 and it contained 430 housing units.

== Geography ==
Menominee is Townships 28 (part) and 29 (part) North, Ranges 1 (part) and 2 (part) West of the Fourth Principal Meridian.

According to the 2021 census gazetteer files, Menominee Township has a total area of 30.36 square miles (78.63 km^{2}), of which 27.94 square miles (72.36 km^{2}) (or 92.02%) is land and 2.42 square miles (6.27 km^{2}) (or 7.98%) is water.

=== Cities, towns, villages ===
- Menominee

=== Major highways ===
- U.S. Route 20

=== Airports and landing strips ===
- Coursens Landing Airport

=== Rivers ===
- Mississippi River
- Little Menominee River
- Sinsinawa River

== Demographics ==
As of the 2020 census there were 1,035 people, 439 households, and 234 families residing in the township. The population density was 34.09 inhabitants per square mile (13.16/km^{2}). There were 430 housing units at an average density of 14.16 per square mile (5.47/km^{2}). The racial makeup of the township was 94.88% White, 0.10% African American, 0.00% Native American, 0.00% Asian, 0.00% Pacific Islander, 2.61% from other races, and 2.42% from two or more races. Hispanic or Latino people of any race were 4.15% of the population.

There were 439 households, out of which 21.40% had children under the age of 18 living with them, 39.41% were married couples living together, 13.67% had a female householder with no spouse present, and 46.70% were non-families. 35.80% of all households were made up of individuals, and 16.40% had someone living alone who was 65 years of age or older. The average household size was 2.21 and the average family size was 2.92.

The township's age distribution consisted of 20.4% under the age of 18, 13.1% from 18 to 24, 25% from 25 to 44, 30.1% from 45 to 64, and 11.4% who were 65 years of age or older. The median age was 32.7 years. For every 100 females, there were 127.1 males. For every 100 females age 18 and over, there were 153.8 males.

The median income for a family was $115,735. Males had a median income of $38,139 versus $29,107 for females. The per capita income for the township was $33,622. No families and 0.2% of the population were below the poverty line, including none of those under age 18 and none of those age 65 or over.

Historical population
Census	Pop.	Note	%±
2000	1,032		—
2010	1,122		8.7%
2020	1,035		−7.8%
U.S. Decennial Census

== School districts ==
- East Dubuque Community Unit School District 119
- Galena Unit School District 120

== Political districts ==
- Illinois' 16th congressional district
- State House District 89
- State Senate District 45
