= National Register of Historic Places listings in Todd County, Minnesota =

Location of Todd County in Minnesota

Todd County, Minnesota, United States, has 14 properties and districts listed on the National Register of Historic Places.

This National Park Service list is complete through NPS recent listings posted July 10, 2026.

== Current listings ==
	Name on the Register	Image	Date listed	Location	City or town	Description
1	Bank of Long Prairie	Bank of Long Prairie	September 5, 1985 (#85001994)	262 Central Ave. 45°58′28″N 94°51′40″W	Long Prairie	1903 commercial building constructed for Todd County's leading bank, with a Romanesque/Classical Revival design by Omeyer & Thori.
2	Batcher Opera House Block	Batcher Opera House Block	August 11, 2004 (#04000837)	5th St. and 2nd Ave. 46°21′19″N 94°47′38″W	Staples	1907 theatre building that provided a cultural venue for everything from vaudeville shows to fine opera, as well as community events.
3	Bridge No. L7075	Bridge No. L7075	April 12, 2016 (#16000158)	290th St. over Turtle Creek, 0.1 mi. east of CSAH 25; 46°02′57″N 94°48′46″W	Hartford Township	NPS Rustic/Neoclassical bridge built by the Works Progress Administration circa 1940 and expanded around 1942; a distinctive three-span example of the era's arch bridges with a modular iron-plate substructure and masonry façade.
4	Dr. George R. Christie House	Dr. George R. Christie House	December 27, 2006 (#06001184)	15 1st St. S. 45°58′26″N 94°51′51″W	Long Prairie	1901 house and office of Todd County's first licensed physician. Now a house museum.
5	Church of St. Joseph-Catholic	Church of St. Joseph-Catholic	September 5, 1985 (#85001996)	720 N. Main St. 46°05′12″N 94°52′04″W	Browerville	Baroque Revival church built 1908–9 for a large Polish immigrant congregation.
6	Eagle Bend High School	Eagle Bend High School	July 25, 2024 (#100010559)	405 Main St. 46°09′55″N 95°02′32″W	Eagle Bend	Prominent 1942 high school with a 1952 auditorium/gymnasium, exhibiting the distinctive characteristics of WPA Moderne architecture.
7	Germania Hall	Germania Hall	November 29, 1995 (#95001377)	40430 County Highway 11; 46°12′58″N 94°58′05″W	Germania Township	Rare surviving example of a rural community band performance hall, built 1917; also significant as a longstanding meeting hall for Germania Township.
8	Grey Eagle Village Hall	Grey Eagle Village Hall	September 5, 1985 (#85001992)	Spruce and Woodman Sts. 45°49′26″N 94°44′53″W	Grey Eagle	Exemplary 1934 municipal hall built by the Civil Works Administration.
9	Hewitt Public School	Hewitt Public School	December 27, 2006 (#06001181)	514 N. Wisconsin St. 46°19′40″N 95°05′02″W	Hewitt	Public school in service 1911–1952, central to Hewitt's education and social history, hosting kindergarten through high school, civic events, and a variety of social services. Now the Hewitt Museum & Library.
10	Hotel Reichert	Hotel Reichert	September 5, 1985 (#85001995)	20 3rd St. N. 45°58′28″N 94°51′37″W	Long Prairie	Sophisticated first-class hotel built 1902–3, marking a key amenity in Long Prairie's growth.
11	Kahlert Mercantile Store	Kahlert Mercantile Store	September 5, 1985 (#85001997)	545 Main St. S. 46°05′07″N 94°52′01″W	Browerville	1883 false-fronted store, a highly intact example of the vernacular commercial buildings initially constructed in Minnesota's railroad boomtowns.
12	Northern Pacific Railway Depot and Freighthouse	Northern Pacific Railway Depot and Freighthouse	June 4, 2008 (#85003613)	320 1st Ave. N. 46°21′16″N 94°47′44″W	Staples	Two 1900s buildings of a Northern Pacific Railway division headquarters, featuring a well-preserved example of Northern Pacific's depot architecture.
13	Saint Cloud and Red River Valley Stage Road-Kandota Section	Saint Cloud and Red River Valley Stage Road-Kandota Section	August 30, 1991 (#91001061)	Off County Highway 92 southeast of West Union; 45°46′28″N 95°00′11″W	Kandota Township	250-yard (230 m) fragment of a key stagecoach road established in 1859, a reminder of the stagecoach companies' founding role in laying down the state's overland travel routes.
14	Todd County Courthouse, Sheriff's House, and Jail	Todd County Courthouse, Sheriff's House, and Jail	September 5, 1985 (#85001986)	215 1st Ave. S. 45°58′21″N 94°51′41″W	Long Prairie	Long-serving county government complex with an 1883 Italianate courthouse.

== See also ==
- List of National Historic Landmarks in Minnesota
- National Register of Historic Places listings in Minnesota
