= Kahlert =

Kahlert is a surname. Notable people with the surname include:

- Detlef Kahlert (born 1962), German archer
- Karl Friedrich Kahlert (1765–1813), German author of gothic fiction
- Corina Pia Kahlert (born 1964), German artist. Since 2012 known as Corinne Torii

== See also ==
- Kahlert Mercantile Store in Browerville, Minnesota
- Kahlert School of Computing and Khalert Village at the University of Utah
