= Saint Cloud and Red River Valley Stage Road–Kandota Section =

- Saint Cloud and Red River Valley Stage Road-Kandota Section
- U.S. National Register of Historic Places
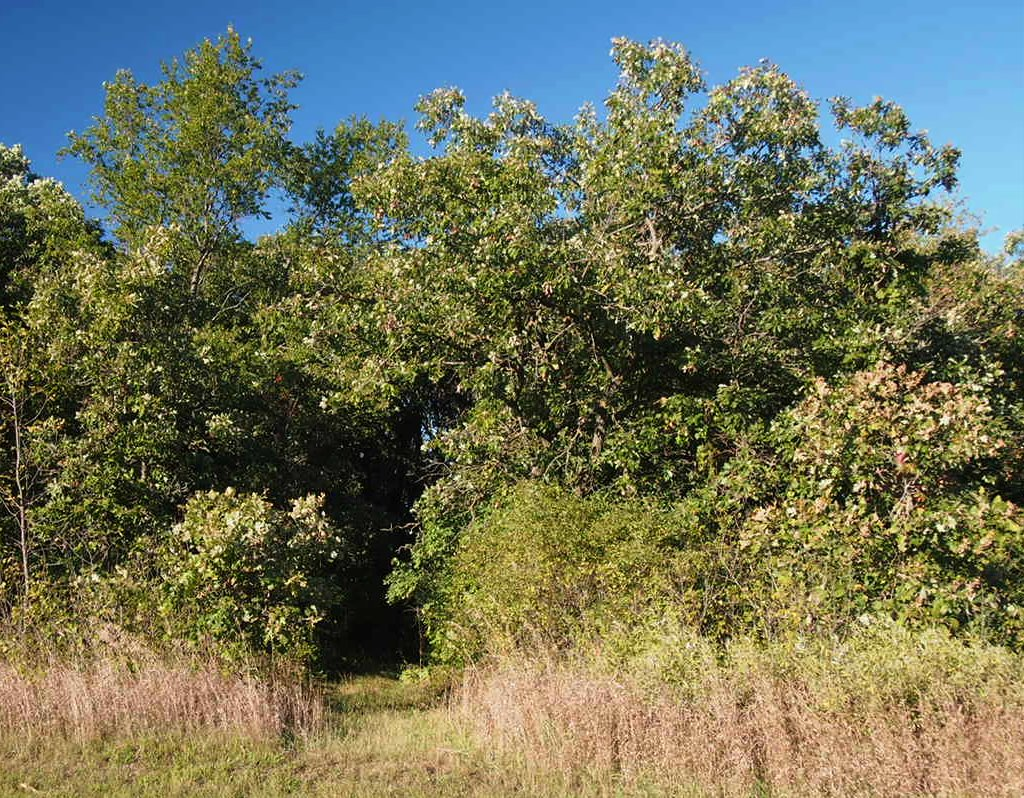
- The road section leading into a forested area

- Location within Minnesota Location within the United States
- Location: Off County Highway 92, Kandota Township, Minnesota
- Coordinates: 45°46′29″N 95°0′12″W
- Area: Less than one acre
- Built: 1859
- MPS: Overland Staging Industry in Minnesota MPS
- NRHP reference No.: 91001061
- Designated: August 30, 1991

The Saint Cloud and Red River Valley Stage Road–Kandota Section is a preserved fragment of a stagecoach road in Kandota Township, Minnesota, United States. It was part of a long route established in 1859 that ran from St. Cloud, Minnesota, to the Red River Valley on the border of Minnesota, North Dakota, and Manitoba. The 250-yard-long (230 m) road fragment was listed on the National Register of Historic Places in 1991 for having state-level significance in the theme of transportation. It was nominated for being a remnant of one of Minnesota's most important stagecoach roads, and a reminder of the stagecoach companies' founding role in establishing the state's overland travel routes.

== Description ==
The Kandota Section begins at a westward bend of Todd County Highway 92 and runs northwest for 250 yards (230 m), where all traces of it are lost in an agricultural field. The first 50 yards (46 m) descend a slight incline through a wooded area and have small ditches on either side of the six-foot-wide (1.8 m) track. The rest of the distance is level and shows no evidence of ditches.

== History ==
The Saint Cloud and Red River Valley Stage Road was prompted by an 1857 international agreement that the Hudson's Bay Company of Canada could supply its Red River outposts from Saint Paul, Minnesota. The Northwestern Express and Transportation Company acquired the contract to carry the supplies and—following a merger and name change to the Minnesota Stage Company—mail between St. Cloud and Fort Abercrombie. One of the stagecoach company's partners, Russell Blakely, led the road-blazing crew. They began in June 1859, felling trees and building bridges, and the first stagecoach was able to traverse the route on July 4.

The road was the first to carry regular stagecoach traffic from the settlements of Central Minnesota to the Red River Valley, and functioned in concert with the establishment of steamboat service on the Red River of the North. The road also spurred the development of west-central Minnesota, as towns were founded along its route.

The Saint Cloud and Red River Valley Stage Road did so well that in 1863 the stage company had to advertise for more drivers and teams. By 1871, though, the first rail line was completed to the Red River Valley and road traffic diminished. Portions of the stage route were incorporated into the road network and modernized, but the Kandota fragment was abandoned in 1939.

== See also ==
- National Register of Historic Places listings in Todd County, Minnesota
