= Bridge L7075 =

- Bridge No. L7075
- U.S. National Register of Historic Places
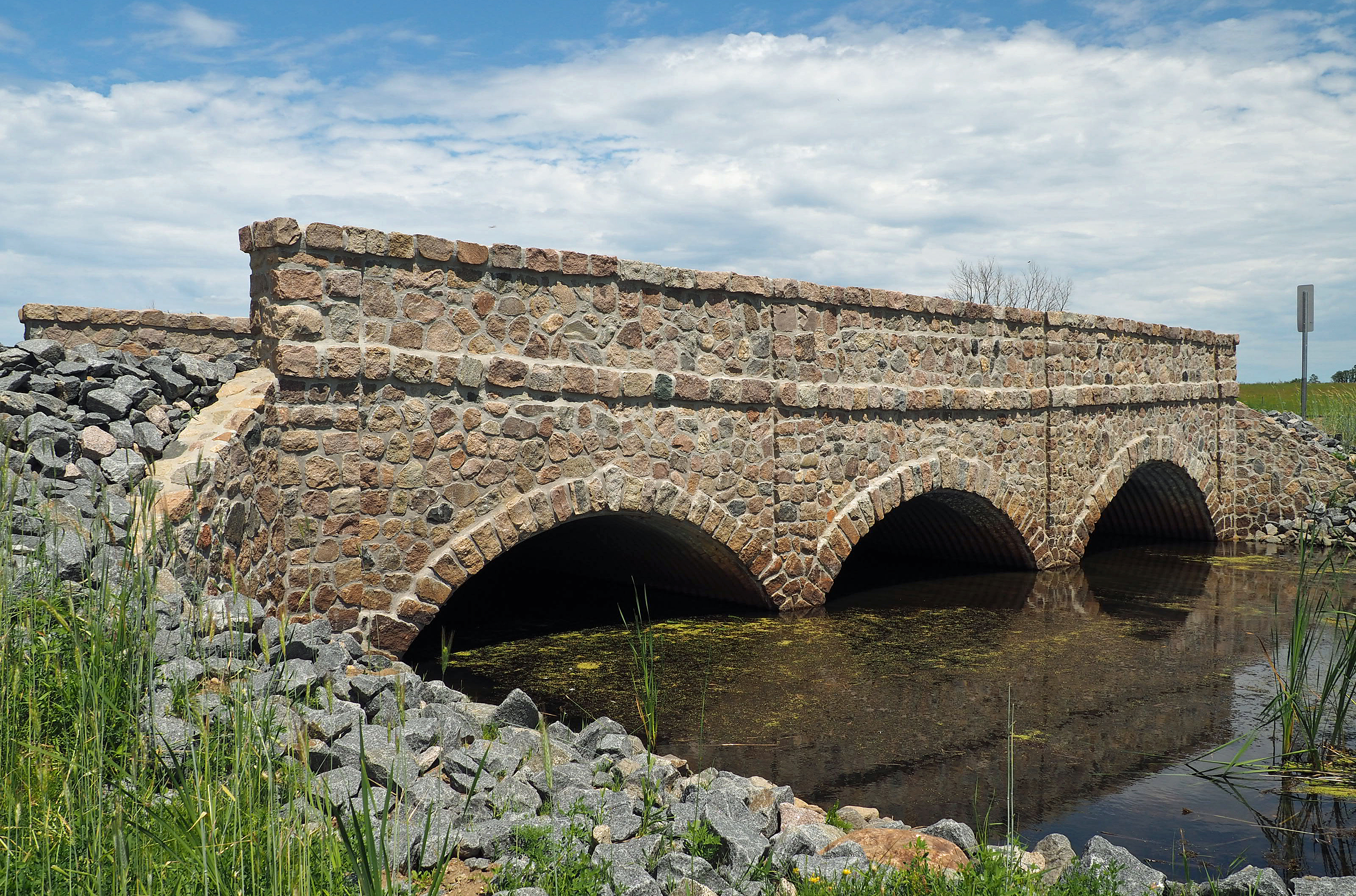
- Bridge L7075 from the southwest

- Location within Minnesota Location within the United States
- Location: 290th Street over Turtle Creek, Hartford Township, Minnesota
- Coordinates: 46°2′56.8″N 94°48′46.5″W
- Area: .07 acres (0.028 ha)
- Built: c. 1940, c. 1942
- Built by: Works Progress Administration
- Architect: Todd County Highway Department
- MPS: Iron and Steel Bridges in Minnesota MPS
- NRHP reference No.: 16000158
- Designated: April 12, 2016

Bridge L7075 is a historic arch bridge in Hartford Township, Minnesota, United States. It was initially built around 1940 by the Works Progress Administration with a modular corrugated iron product called Multi Plate for the arches and a masonry façade. The bridge was expanded with a third arch around 1942. It was listed on the National Register of Historic Places as Bridge No. L7075 in 2016 for having local significance in the theme of engineering. It was nominated for being a distinctive example of the era's Multi Plate arch bridges and for the fine workmanship embodied in its WPA rustic architecture with Neoclassical detailing.

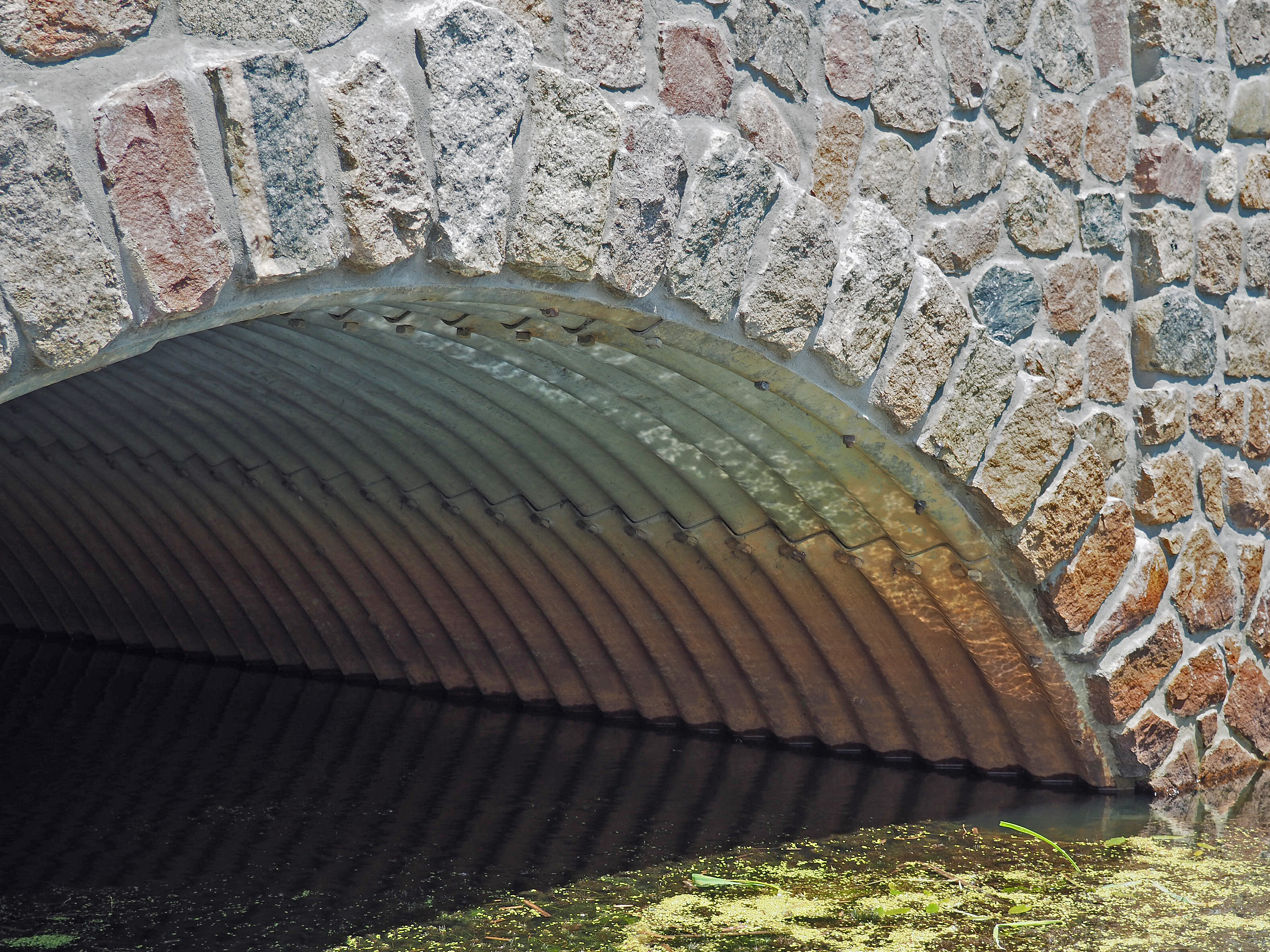
Detail of the modular Multi Plate arch construction

== See also ==
- List of bridges on the National Register of Historic Places in Minnesota
- National Register of Historic Places listings in Todd County, Minnesota
