= Dr. George R. Christie House =

Historic house in Minnesota, United States

- U.S. National Register of Historic Places
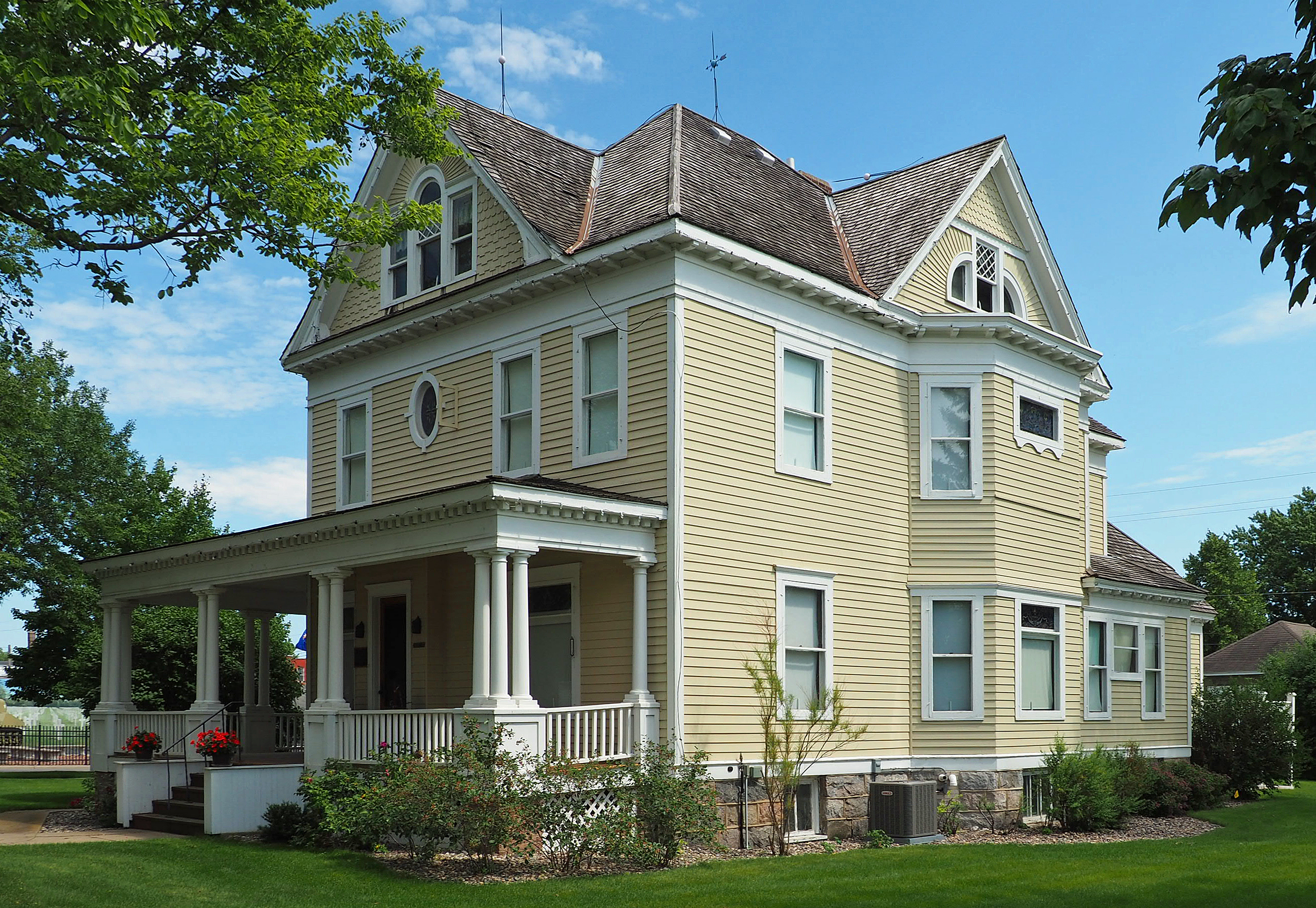
- The Dr. George R. Christie House from the northwest

- Location within Minnesota Location within the United States
- Location: 15 1st Street S., Long Prairie, Minnesota
- Coordinates: 45°58′26″N 94°51′51″W
- Area: .75 acres (0.30 ha)
- Built: 1901
- Built by: C.W. Smith
- Architectural style: Neoclassical
- NRHP reference No.: 06001184
- Designated: December 27, 2006

The Dr. George R. Christie House is a historic house museum in Long Prairie, Minnesota, United States. It was built in 1901 as the family home and office of Dr. George R. Christie (1858–1947), the first licensed physician in Todd County. After housing two generations of the Christie family, the building and its original furnishings were donated to the city of Long Prairie in 1976 to serve as a public museum. The house was listed on the National Register of Historic Places in 2006 for having local significance in the theme of health/medicine. It was nominated for illustrating the social and economic stature afforded to doctors in small-town Minnesota.

== See also ==
- List of museums in Minnesota
- National Register of Historic Places listings in Todd County, Minnesota

== Gallery ==
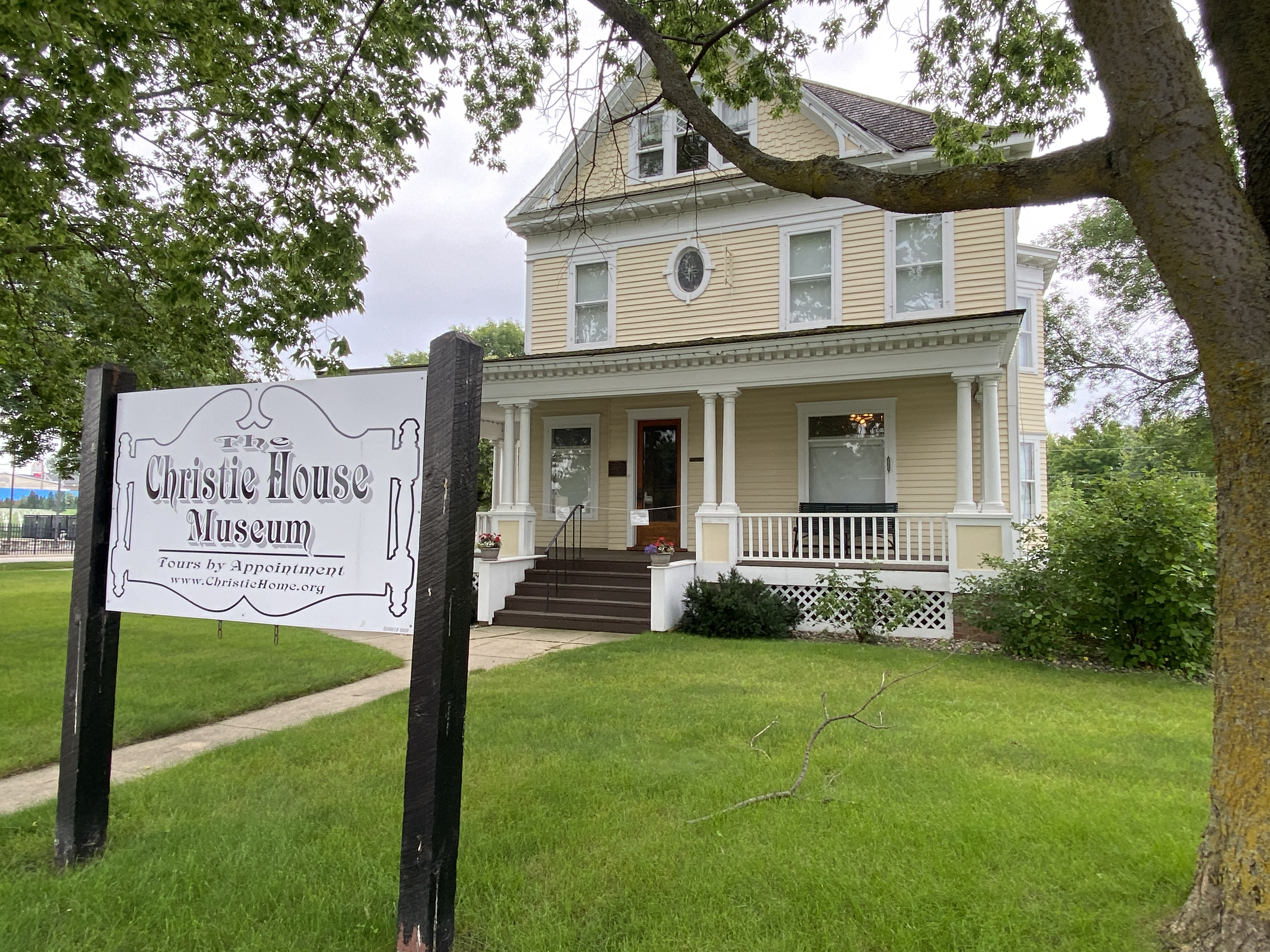
Christie House Museum with sign

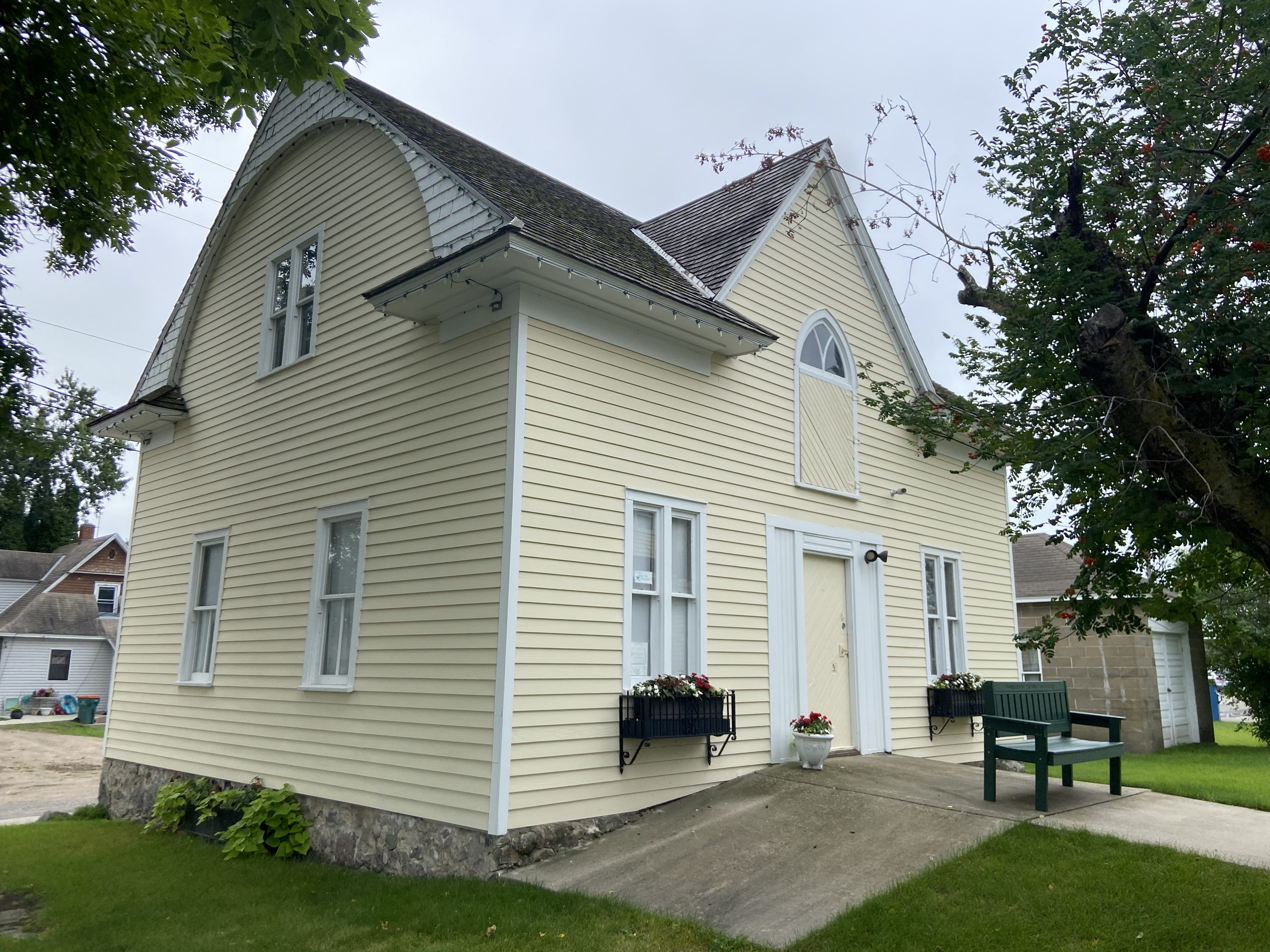
Carriage house

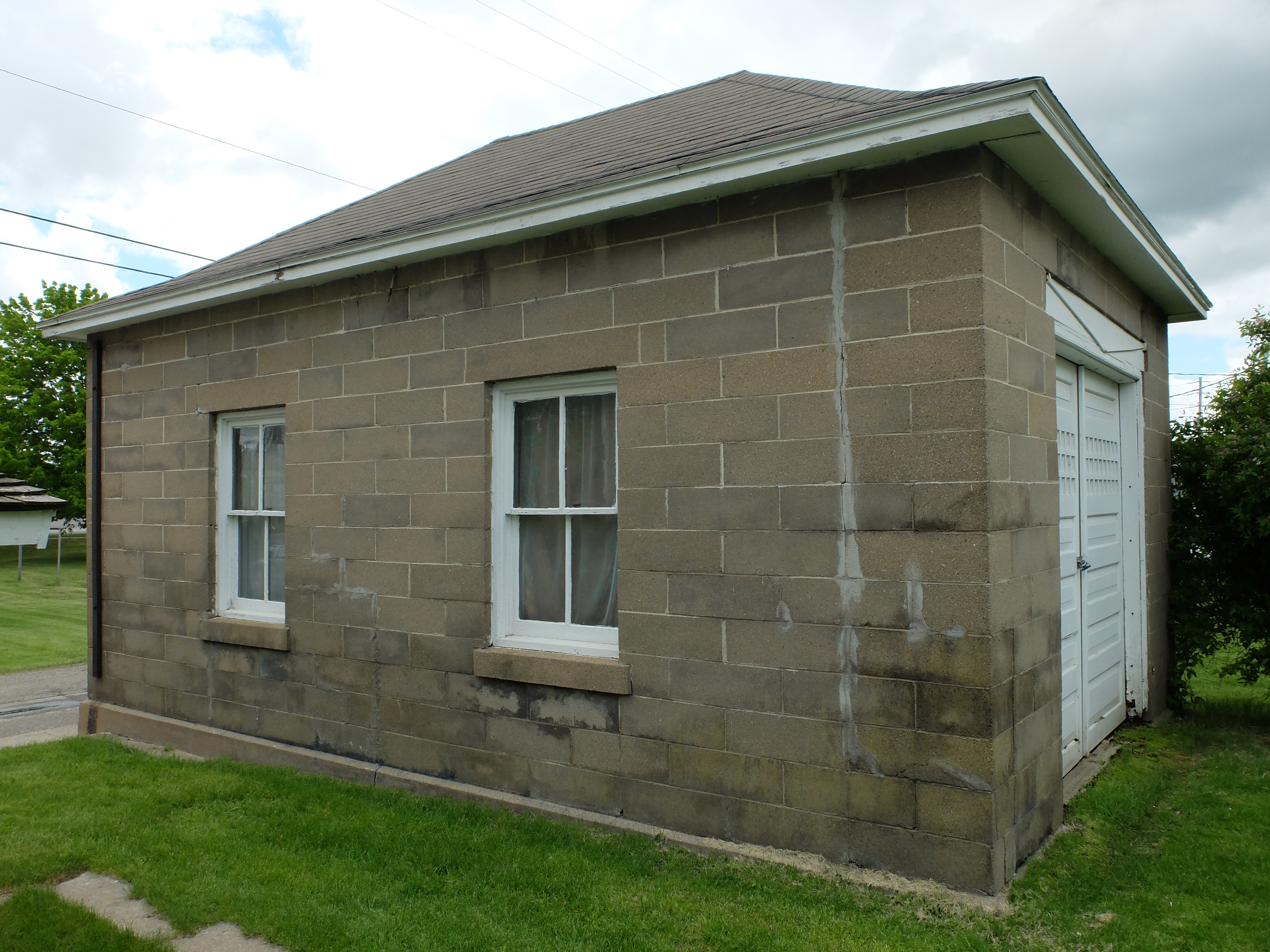
garage

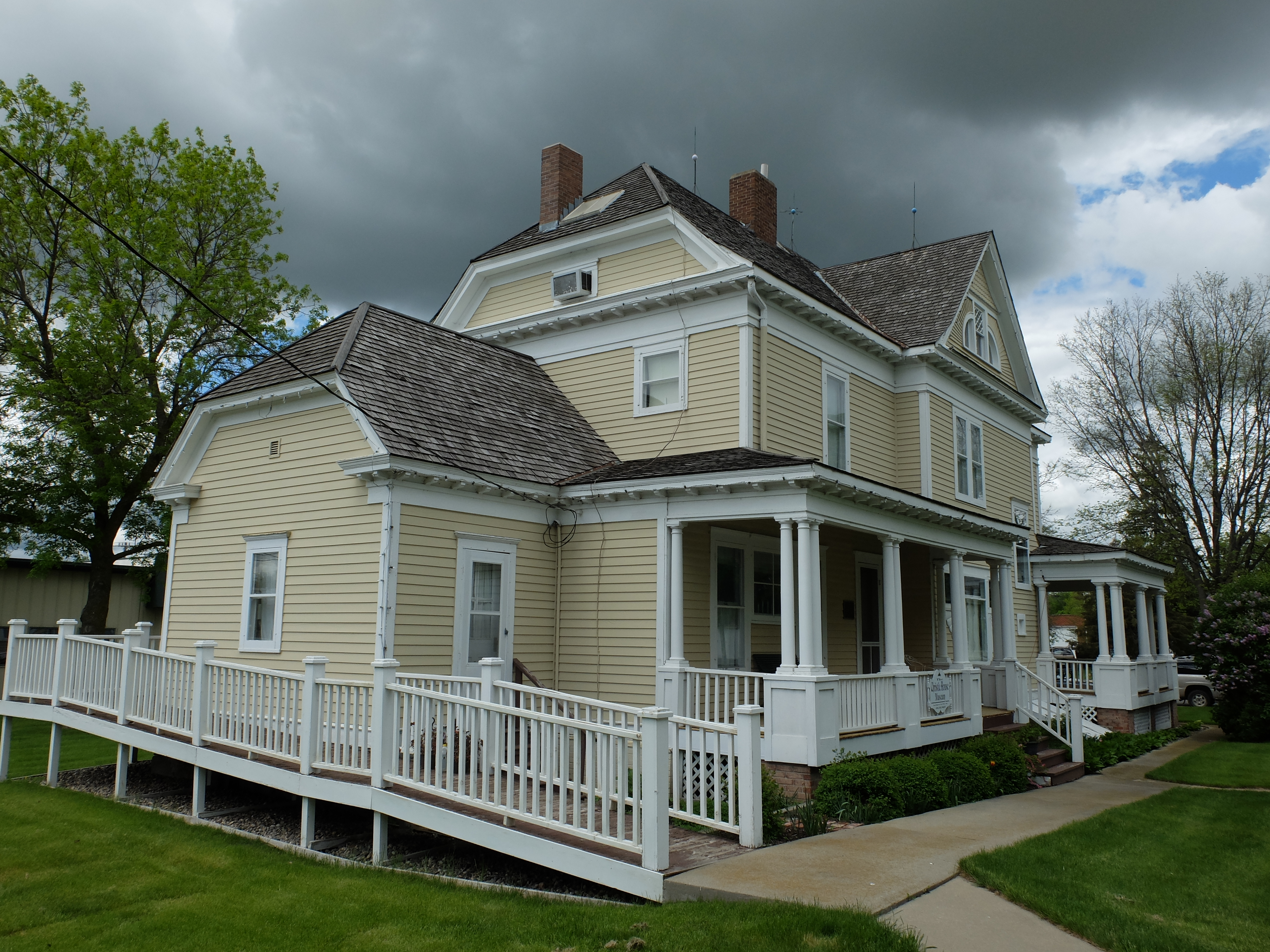
Back of houses
