= Kahlert Mercantile Store =

- U.S. National Register of Historic Places
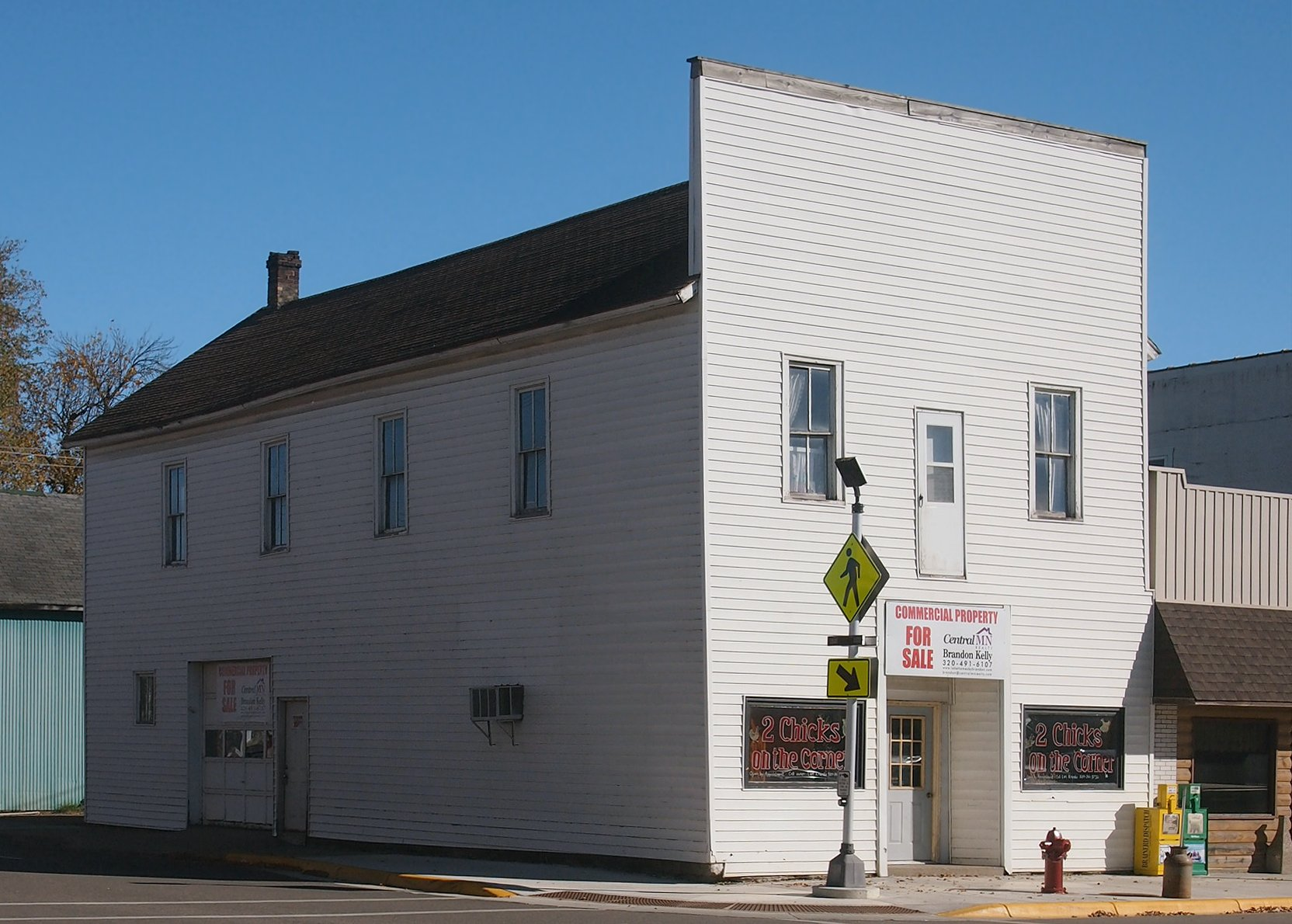
- The Kahlert Mercantile Store from the northwest

- Location within Minnesota Location within the United States
- Location: 545 Main Street S., Browerville, Minnesota
- Coordinates: 46°5′6.5″N 94°52′1″W
- Area: Less than one acre
- Built: 1883
- Architectural style: Vernacular
- NRHP reference No.: 85001997
- Designated: September 5, 1985

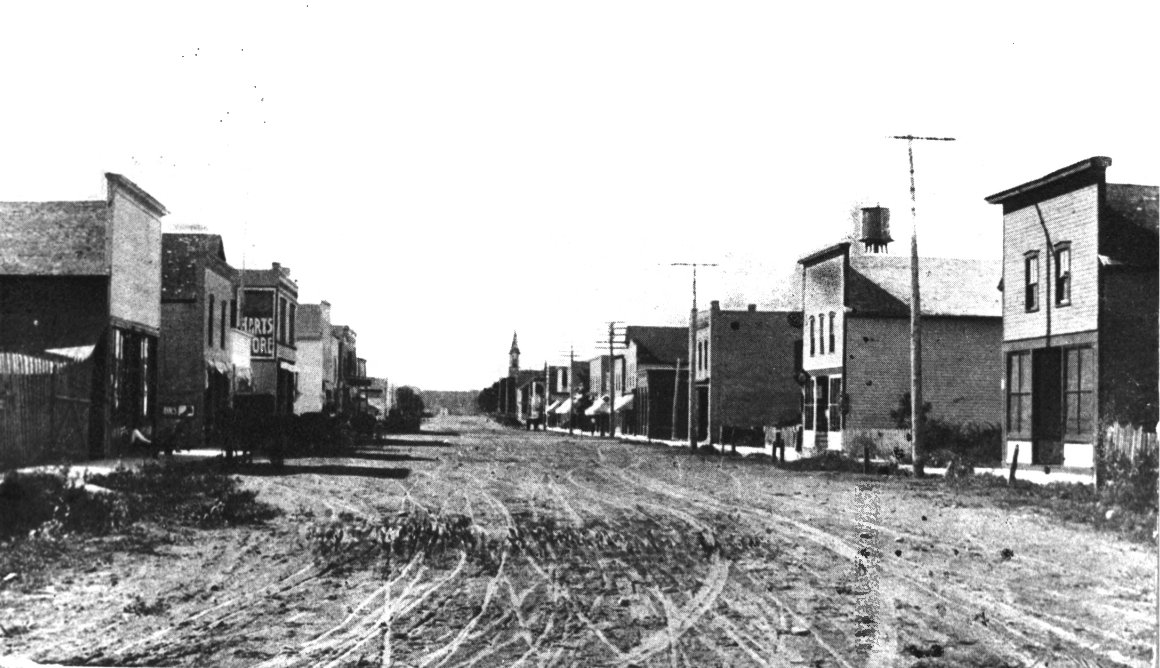
Browerville's Main Street circa 1910, with the Kahlert Store just visible as the fifth building on the left

The Kahlert Mercantile Store is a historic commercial building in Browerville, Minnesota, United States. It was built in 1883 as Browerville was springing up around a newly built railroad line. The simple wooden building with a false front contained retail space on the ground floor and a community meeting hall upstairs. The building was listed on the National Register of Historic Places in 1985 for having local significance in the themes of commerce and exploration/settlement. It was nominated for being a highly intact example of the vernacular commercial architecture erected in Minnesota's railroad boomtowns.

== Description ==
The Kahlert Mercantile Store is a two-story wood-frame building with a 25-by-82-foot (7.6 by 25 m) footprint. It has the squared-off false front typical of 19th-century rural and frontier towns. However the second floor rises a full story to accommodate the meeting hall, whereas most such buildings had a truncated upper floor. The Kahlert Store lacks any basement. The building is covered in clapboard siding broken by two-over-two sash windows.

A balcony once projected from the front façade. It was removed around 1910, likely to accommodate improvements to the adjacent street or sidewalk. The only other major exterior alteration is the addition of a sliding garage door near the rear of the north wall.

== History ==
The Kahlert Mercantile Store was established by brothers William and Ferdinand Kahlert. They were early settlers of Todd County who arrived in 1870, initially homesteading in Hartford Township. In 1882 the Sauk Center and Northern Railway—a subsidiary of the St. Paul, Minneapolis and Manitoba Railway—built a rail line nearby. Although mostly intended to access railroad-owned timber land, the rail line sparked the establishment of several towns along its route, including Browerville. Although a small village had been coalescing in Hartford Township, most of its business owners quickly relocated to the new trackside town, and the Kahlert brothers followed suit in 1883.

Their building, at the corner of Main Street and 6th Street, used the same false-front style as most of the other early construction in Browerville. They operated a general store and grocery out of the ground floor. Despite competition from several similar stores in town, the Kahlerts prospered and even expanded into an adjacent building by 1900. Over the same period the meeting hall they'd established on the upper floor served as a popular venue for local gatherings, social events, and church services.

== See also ==
- National Register of Historic Places listings in Todd County, Minnesota
