= Long Prairie Municipal Airport =

Long Prairie Municipal Airport Todd Field
- IATA: none; ICAO: none; FAA LID: 14Y

Summary
- Airport type: Public
- Owner: Todd County / City of Long Prairie
- Serves: Long Prairie, Minnesota
- Elevation AMSL: 1,333 ft / 406 m
- Coordinates: 45°53′54″N 094°52′26″W

Map
- Location of airport in Minnesota/United States 14Y (the United States)

Runways
Direction	Length		Surface
Direction	ft	m	Surface
16/34	3,000	914	Asphalt

Statistics (2008)
- Aircraft operations: 5,730
- Based aircraft: 15
- Sources: Minnesota DOT, FAA

Long Prairie Municipal Airport (FAA LID: 14Y), also known as Todd Field or Todd Field Airport, is a public use airport located four nautical miles (7 km) south of the central business district of Long Prairie, a city in Todd County, Minnesota, United States. The airport is owned by Todd County and the City of Long Prairie.

== Facilities and aircraft ==
Todd Field covers an area of 160 acres (65 ha) at an elevation of 1,333 feet (406 m) above mean sea level. It has one runway designated 16/34 with an asphalt surface measuring 3,000 by 75 feet (914 x 23 m).

For the 12-month period ending July 21, 2008, the airport had 5,730 aircraft operations, an average of 15 per day: 99.8% general aviation and 0.2% military. At that time there were 15 aircraft based at this airport: 93% single-engine and 7% ultralight.

== See also ==
- List of airports in Minnesota
