= Germania Hall =

- U.S. National Register of Historic Places
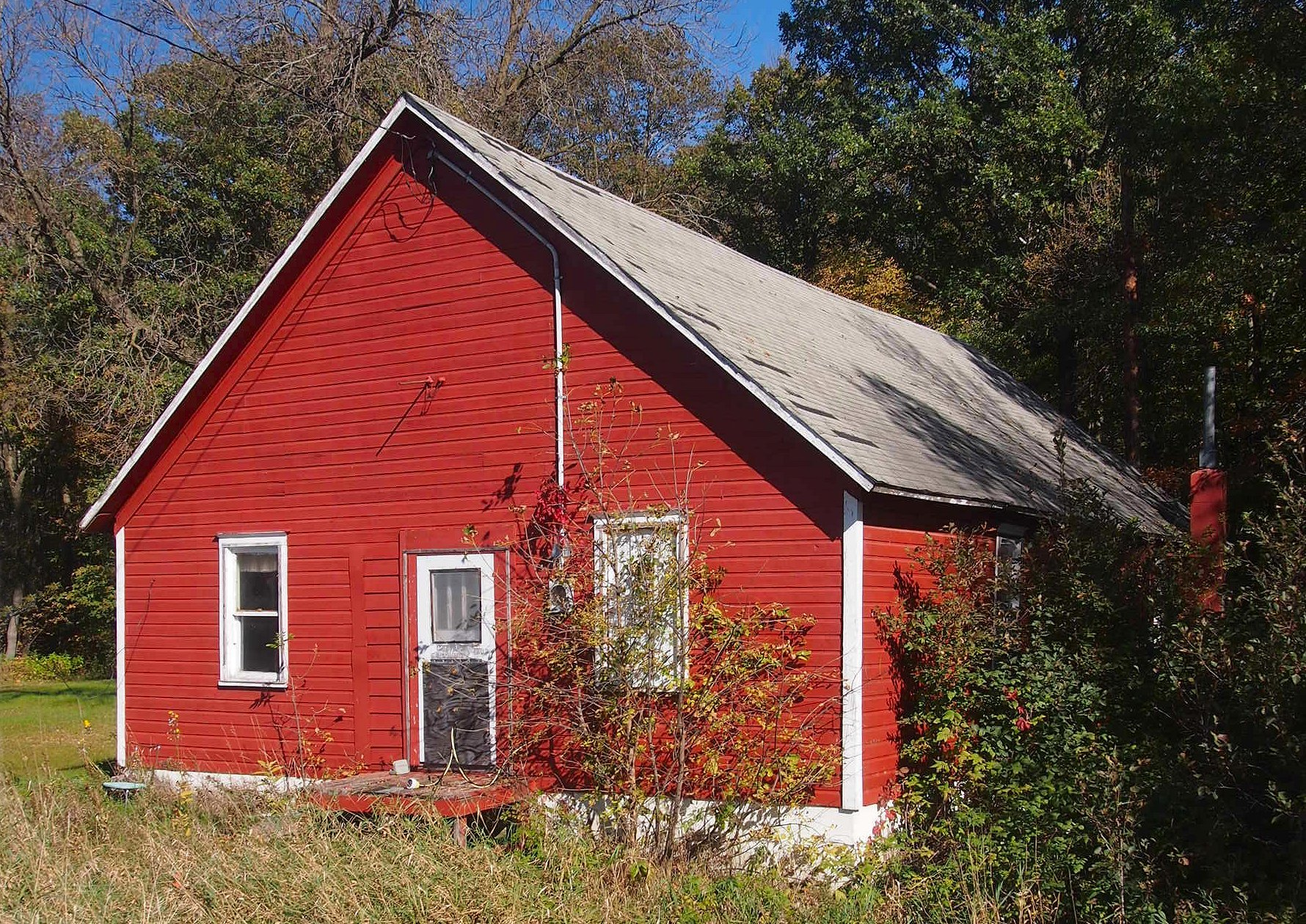
- Germania Hall from the southwest

- Location within Minnesota Location within the United States
- Location: 40430 County Highway 11, Germania Township, Minnesota
- Coordinates: 46°12′58.5″N 94°58′5″W
- Area: 1 acre (0.40 ha)
- Built: 1917
- Built by: John Johnson
- NRHP reference No.: 95001377
- Designated: November 29, 1995

Germania Hall is a historic community hall in Germania Township, Minnesota, United States. It was built in 1917 as a practice and performing space for a community band. Later it served as a general event venue for its rural township. The building was listed on the National Register of Historic Places in 1995 for having local significance in the themes of performing arts and social history. It was nominated for being a rare surviving example of a community band hall, and for its long service as the township's social and political center.

== Description ==
Germania Hall is a simple one-story, wood-frame building with a gable roof. Its footprint measures 28 by 50 feet (8.5 by 15 m). It stands on a poured concrete foundation and has shiplap siding.

The main entry is a single door centered on the western façade. The interior is a single room with a stage at the eastern end raised about three feet (0.9 m) above the hardwood floor.

== The Germania Cornet Band ==
Around 1915, 20 area residents formed a brass band. This was a common hobby in the United States from the mid-19th century through about 1920. The instruments were easy to learn and demand for performances was high, as virtually any public gathering from fairs to grand opening ceremonies to funerals was considered incomplete without a brass band. The majority of the members of the newly formed Germania Cornet Band lived and worked on farms within three miles of each other. They were mostly young, American-born sons of Swedish and Norwegian immigrants who had come to the United States in the 1880s. However the oldest band member, 43-year-old Gustaf Peterson, had himself left Sweden in 1892 and settled in Germania Township in 1903. Several band members were siblings, and at least two were just 13 years old.

As founding member Carl Peterson later recalled, "none of us had ever played an instrument—we didn't even know how to read notes, but we thought it would be fun to have a band." The group hired "Professor" George Mundy of nearby Eagle Bend, Minnesota, to be their band director, paying him $5 (equivalent to $148 in 2025) per practice session. Mundy helped them order their instruments—brass bands were so common that package deals of all necessary instruments plus sheet music were available by mail-order from several companies. Peterson went on: "It was a great day when our instruments arrived—everyone tried to blow the horns, beat the drums, etc." An early photograph of the Germania Cornet Band shows members wielding five types of horn, three types of trumpet, three clarinets, one trombone, a snare drum, and a bass drum. Almost as important as instruments were a band's uniforms—the Germania Band's outfits were black with gold braid and the initials "G.B." stitched on the collar.

The band performed at concerts and barn dances in the area. Their repertoire consisted of locally popular music: a mix of polkas, waltzes, two-steps, and some Nordic folk music. The bandmembers took no money individually, pooling their earnings to pay their instructor Mundy. In the summer of 1916 they performed twice in the barn of member Sigvard Bjerken's family. That December they gave a concert at the opera house in nearby Clarissa, Minnesota. Initially the band had been practicing in a vacant building, but by March 1917 they had earned enough to commission their own band hall. Bjerken's parents gave them a free 20-year lease on an acre at the edge of their farm. The band paid Clarissa resident John Johnson $150 (equivalent to $3,769 in 2025) to design and build a suitable space, and they assisted him in the labor.

The band hall was dedicated on September 23, 1917, in a ceremony that included orators, a picnic dinner, performances by the Germania Cornet Band and a few other bands, and a "loyalty demonstration" intended to counteract growing discrimination against immigrant communities as the United States entered World War I. The following month, band director George Mundy—who had also helped found the Clarissa High School Band—moved away to Pelican Rapids, Minnesota, to start a new musical group there. The Germania Cornet Band was able to continue without him, holding practices, concerts, and dances at their new hall and performing at numerous community events. They also opened up the hall to others. In September 1918 it was the site of a dance benefitting the Red Cross and a locally produced play. Other area bands performed there and dances were scheduled regularly. The township board began using the hall for meetings and elections. During Prohibition, the organizer of the regular Saturday night dances alerted the county sheriff to troublemakers getting drunk on moonshine, resulting in a January 1925 raid that landed seven young men in jail. The Clarissa Independent proudly reported that all but two of them were "outsiders" from Bartlett Township and Aldrich, Minnesota.

== Community use ==
The Germania Cornet Band folded in the early 1920s. Around the nation, the heyday of the community brass band was drawing to a close as phonographs, movies, and radio provided new ways to hear music, and the advent of cars, telephones, and better roads reduced the isolation of rural communities. However these same factors eased the creation of rural community clubs, and the newly formed Germania Community Club took on a key role in local social life. Throughout the 1930s the club sponsored educational lectures, talent shows, and spelling bees at the hall. They also organized a popular annual picnic that typically included music, dancing, speeches, food concessions, and sporting contests such as races, horseshoes, wrestling, boxing, tug-of-war, and baseball.

In 1950 the hall was donated to the Germania Community Club and they purchased its one-acre (0.4 ha) lot for $50 (equivalent to $669 in 2025). A 1968 newspaper article noted that the hall was still regularly used by 4-H and other groups for athletic practices and events, school programs, talent shows, township meetings, and elections. At the time of the hall's National Register nomination in the mid-1990s, the Germania Community Club continued to hold monthly meetings and dances there. The township government has since relocated to a building that originated as a 1941 school, but the old hall is "still used for occasional dances, parties, and even as a large family’s hunting headquarters".

== See also ==
- National Register of Historic Places listings in Todd County, Minnesota
