= Todd County Courthouse (Minnesota) =

- Todd County Courthouse, Sheriff's House, and Jail
- U.S. National Register of Historic Places
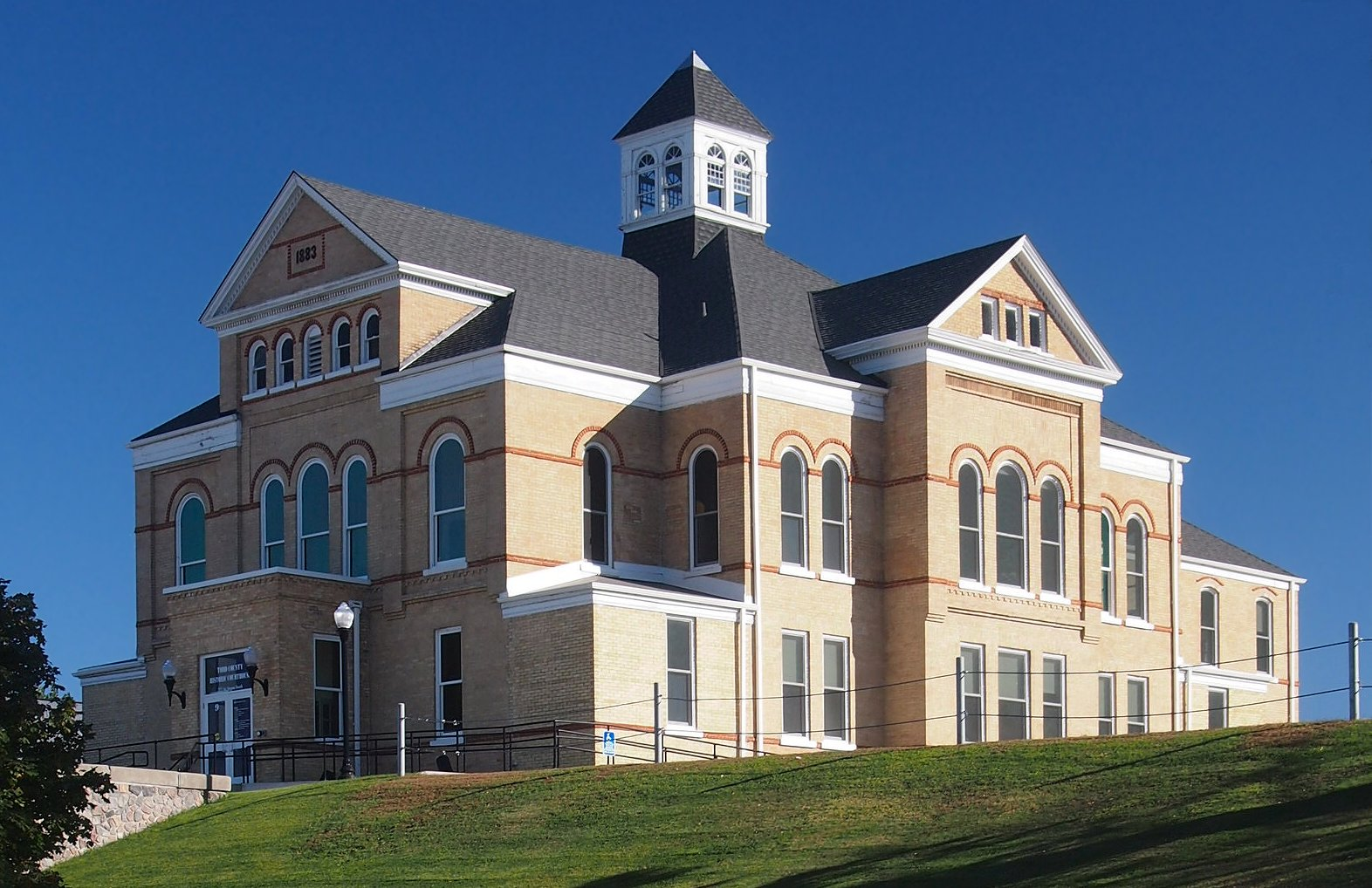
- The Todd County Courthouse from the northwest

- Location within Minnesota Location within the United States
- Map showing the location of Todd County Courthouse
- Location: 215 1st Avenue South, Long Prairie, Minnesota
- Coordinates: 45°58′21.3″N 94°51′40.7″W
- Area: 2.5 acres (1.0 ha)
- Built: 1883 (courthouse), 1900 (sheriff's house & jail)
- Architect: Charles H. Sparks, P.J. Pauley & Sons
- Architectural style: Italianate
- NRHP reference No.: 85001986
- Designated: September 5, 1985

The Todd County Courthouse is the seat of government for Todd County in Long Prairie, Minnesota, United States. The hilltop courthouse was built in 1883 and is fronted by a street-level stone entryway and retaining wall constructed in 1938 by the Works Progress Administration. Additional modern buildings are set into the hill to the side and rear of the courthouse. To the southwest stood a residence for the sheriff with an attached jailhouse, built in 1900. They were extant in 1985 when the complex was listed on the National Register of Historic Places as the Todd County Courthouse, Sheriff's House, and Jail, but have been demolished since. The property was listed for having state-level significance in the themes of architecture and politics/government. It was nominated for being a good example of an Italianate public building and a long-serving home of the county government.

== Description ==
The Todd County Courthouse has a footprint of approximately 60 by 80 feet (18 by 24 m) with an additional extension to the rear. It rises three stories and is topped with a cupola. The foundation is split fieldstone and the walls are cream-colored brick.

The courthouse stands atop a hill in the center of a city block. A fieldstone retaining wall creates a border on two sides. Mid-block on the north side is a fieldstone entryway which leads into the courthouse basement and provides a double stairway up to the hilltop.

The sheriff's house and jail was a two-story brick building with a hip roof. The jail wing had a separate entry and was also attached to the courthouse.

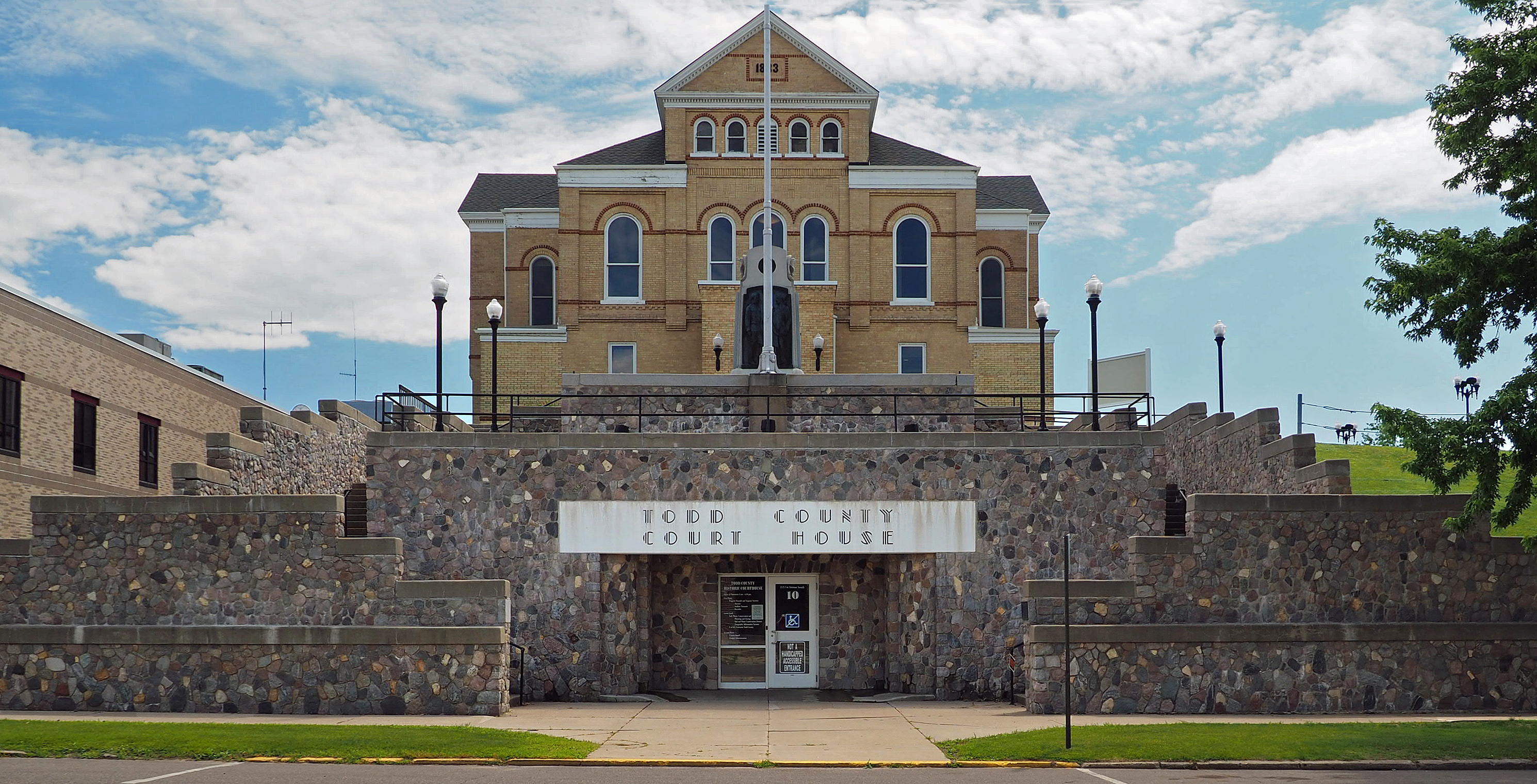
The 1883 courthouse and 1938 WPA entry

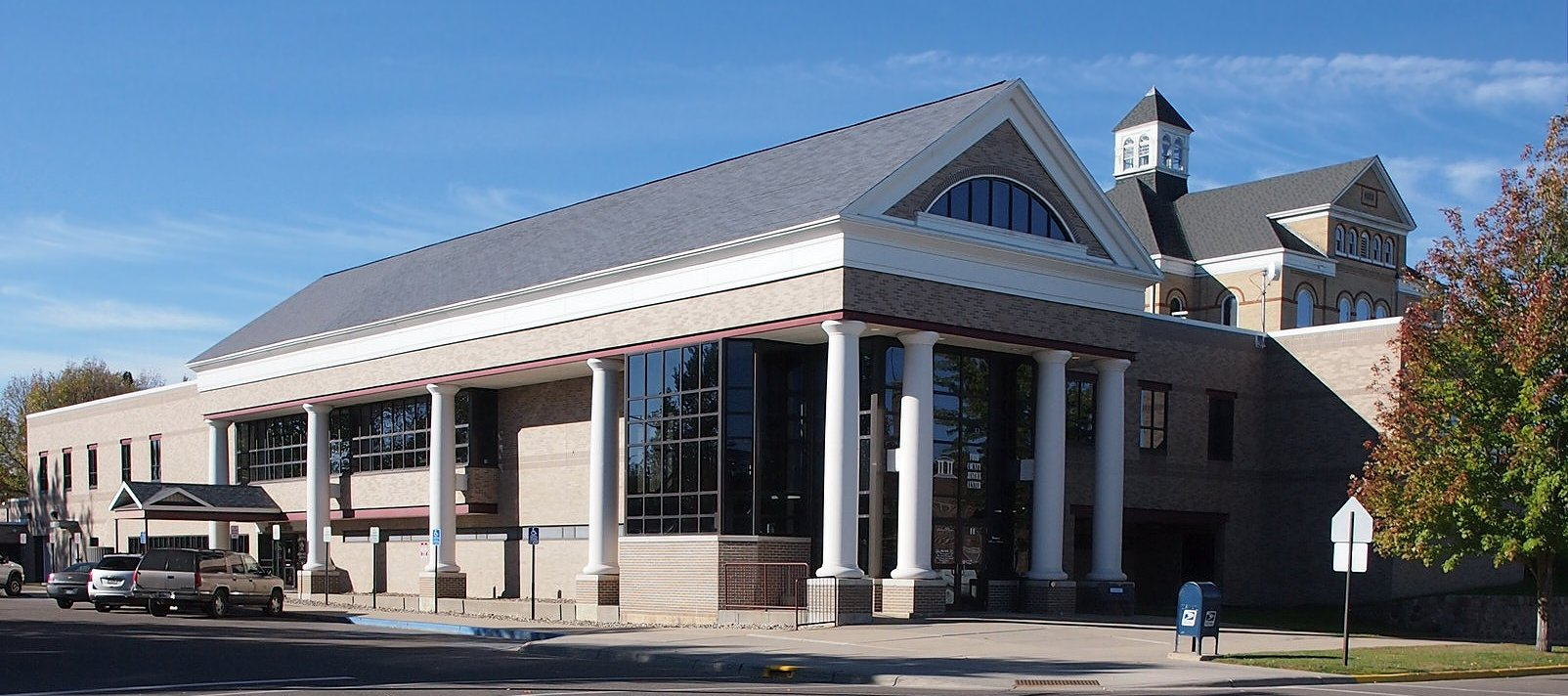
One of the modern annexes built into the foot of the courthouse hill

== History ==
The 1883 Todd County Courthouse is the third to stand on the same site. The county was organized in 1867 and government business was conducted in various private homes until a frame building atop a prominent hill in Long Prairie was donated for use as a courthouse in 1870. It was replaced three years later with a purpose-built two-story frame courthouse.

Ten years after the second courthouse was completed, Todd County officials commissioned the building which still stands today. The St. Louis-based architectural firm of P. J. Pauley was contracted along with architect Charles H. Sparks. It is unclear who contributed what to the design of the building, but the result was in the era's popular Italianate style. The project was completed for $20,000.

Around the year 1900, architect Fremont D. Orff was hired to convert the sheriff's quarters at the rear of the courthouse into regular offices. It is likely but not proven that Orff also designed the separate sheriff's house and jail that were constructed at this time. Small, one-story additions were made to the front corners of the building between 1910 and 1915.

The courthouse complex was modified again in the 1930s, when the county received federal New Deal funds to create jobs during the Great Depression. A crew under the Works Progress Administration (WPA) enlarged the courthouse basement and built an elaborate stone entry with street-level doors and stairs up to the original hilltop entrance. They also replaced the retaining wall at the foot of the hill, added a vestibule to the courthouse façade, replaced the windows, and refinished the interior walls. An annex was built into the courthouse hill in 1965 and another in 1980.

== Disuse and restoration ==
In 1994 the historic courthouse was deemed unsuitable, partly due to noncompliance with the Americans with Disabilities Act of 1990. A new court facility opened in 1996 and most of the county offices had moved off-campus by 2004. Although a grant from the Minnesota Historical Society allowed for replacement of the roof and some windows, the old courthouse was completely vacated in 2006.

With the aging building used merely for storage, the Todd County board of commissioners decided in 2009 that the courthouse had to be rehabilitated or demolished. The following year they put the matter to a county-wide vote, prompting the Preservation Alliance of Minnesota to place the courthouse on its "10 Most Endangered Historic Places" list for 2010.

Although a study determined that the courthouse was structurally sound, the cost of rehabilitating it would be comparable to knocking it down and constructing a whole new building. Advocates of preservation campaigned by writing letters to the editor to the county's various newspapers and by soliciting letters of support from township supervisors and owners of local Century Farms. The resolution passed in the November 2010 election by fewer than 100 votes.

Rehabilitation work began in late summer of 2011. An entrance ramp, elevator, and modernized restrooms addressed the accessibility issues. The arched windows were restored and the masonry was cleaned and repointed. The interior was reconfigured but original features such as the terrazzo floors and a pair of vault doors were preserved. New improvements included modern electrical equipment and a geothermal heat pump.

The historic Todd County Courthouse—one of only 12 courthouses built before 1890 that survive in Minnesota—reopened in June 2012. It contains facilities for several government departments, including the county administrator, tax assessor, watershed district, and board of commissioners.

== See also ==
- List of county courthouses in Minnesota
- National Register of Historic Places listings in Todd County, Minnesota
