= Minnesota Stage Company =

American stagecoach company

The Minnesota Stage Company was the largest stagecoach company based in Minnesota, United States. It was established in 1859 in a merger of J.C. Burbank & Company and Chase & Allen, at which point it controlled all the major stagecoach lines in the state. In the years before railroads linked Minnesota communities, the Minnesota Stage Company played a crucial role in shaping the commercial and social life of the young state.

== Background ==
Willoughby & Powers opened the first stagecoach line in 1849 in what was then Minnesota Territory, running between St. Paul and St. Anthony. There were no railroad lines in the territory. Instead, inhabitants relied on carts, wagons, and coaches for overland travel and shipping. Individuals and companies scrambled to establish roads, routes, and coach lines.

== Establishment ==
James Burbank was born in Vermont and moved to Minnesota by 1849. In 1851, he started a one-man operation transporting letters, documents, and cargo from St. Paul to Galena, Illinois, and back by stagecoach. He officially formed the Northwestern Express Company in 1854. The company's expansion was slow until 1855, when new associate Russell Blakeley helped bring in valuable mail contracts that allowed the company to grow.

Along with the mail contracts, the company soon began to gain wider recognition in Minnesota. In 1858, businessmen from Lake City paid them to operate a line of stage coaches between Lake City and Rochester, Minnesota. In the winter of 1857–58 they were hired by the Hudson's Bay Company to help transport goods from St. Paul to their northern outposts in the Red River Valley. They agreed to operate freight wagons, stage coaches, and steamboats up the Red River to Fort Abercrombie, and then to outposts farther north.

== Peak years ==
In 1859, J.C. Burbank & Company's Northwestern Express merged with the stage company of Allen & Chase to form the Minnesota Stage Company. That June, Russell Blakeley set out with a group to build and expand a stage route from St. Cloud to Fort Abercrombie. In three weeks the team built bridges, cleared trees, and established stage stops along the 160-mile (260 km) stage road. The route, which originally transported freight, soon began transporting passengers to the Red River Valley.

The Minnesota Stage Company's road opened the valley to new immigrants. However, it did so at the expense of the area's original inhabitants. While the stage road ran on land already ceded by the Ojibwe people, the company's steamboats passed through territory held by the tribe's Red Lake and Pembina bands. They wrote to the company requesting compensation for the huge increase in traffic that frightened fish and game and disturbed the spirits of their ancestors.

The company did not compensate the tribe. Instead, the U.S. government sent negotiators to open talks for a new treaty in 1862. The negotiators, however, were unable to reach the Red River Valley because of the start of the Dakota War of 1862, and talks did not proceed. After the war, the company lost its contract with the Hudson's Bay Company. It maintained the stage route, however, carrying goods and people into the Red River Valley.

By the end of 1859, the company controlled all the major stage routes in Minnesota. Its lucrative mail contracts on each line required it to build better roads. It continued to expand its network of stage stops, coaches, and wagons. Where stagecoaches stopped, hotels, restaurants, and shops appeared to serve the traveling clientele. By 1865 the company employed 200 men and regularly used 700 horses. At top speeds, the stagecoaches could travel about 105 miles (169 km) in 24 hours.

== Decline ==
As railroads were built throughout Minnesota in the years following the American Civil War, the role of the stagecoach declined. James Burbank sold his share in the Minnesota Stage Company in 1867 to concentrate on his other business endeavors. By 1880, most parts of Minnesota were linked by railroads, rendering the stage routes obsolete.

== Legacy ==
While the stagecoach industry thrived in Minnesota for less than 30 years, it played a vital role in the development of the state. The company built roads, extended communication networks, and connected the fledgling state. In the late twentieth century, in recognition of their contribution to the history of Minnesota, efforts were made to preserve the remaining stagecoach roads. The Kandota Section of the Red River Valley Stage Road and the Mount Pleasant Section of the Lake City and Rochester Stage Road, both built by the Minnesota Stage Company, were listed on the National Register of Historic Places in 1991.
