= Germania Township, Todd County, Minnesota =

Germania Township, Minnesota
- Township
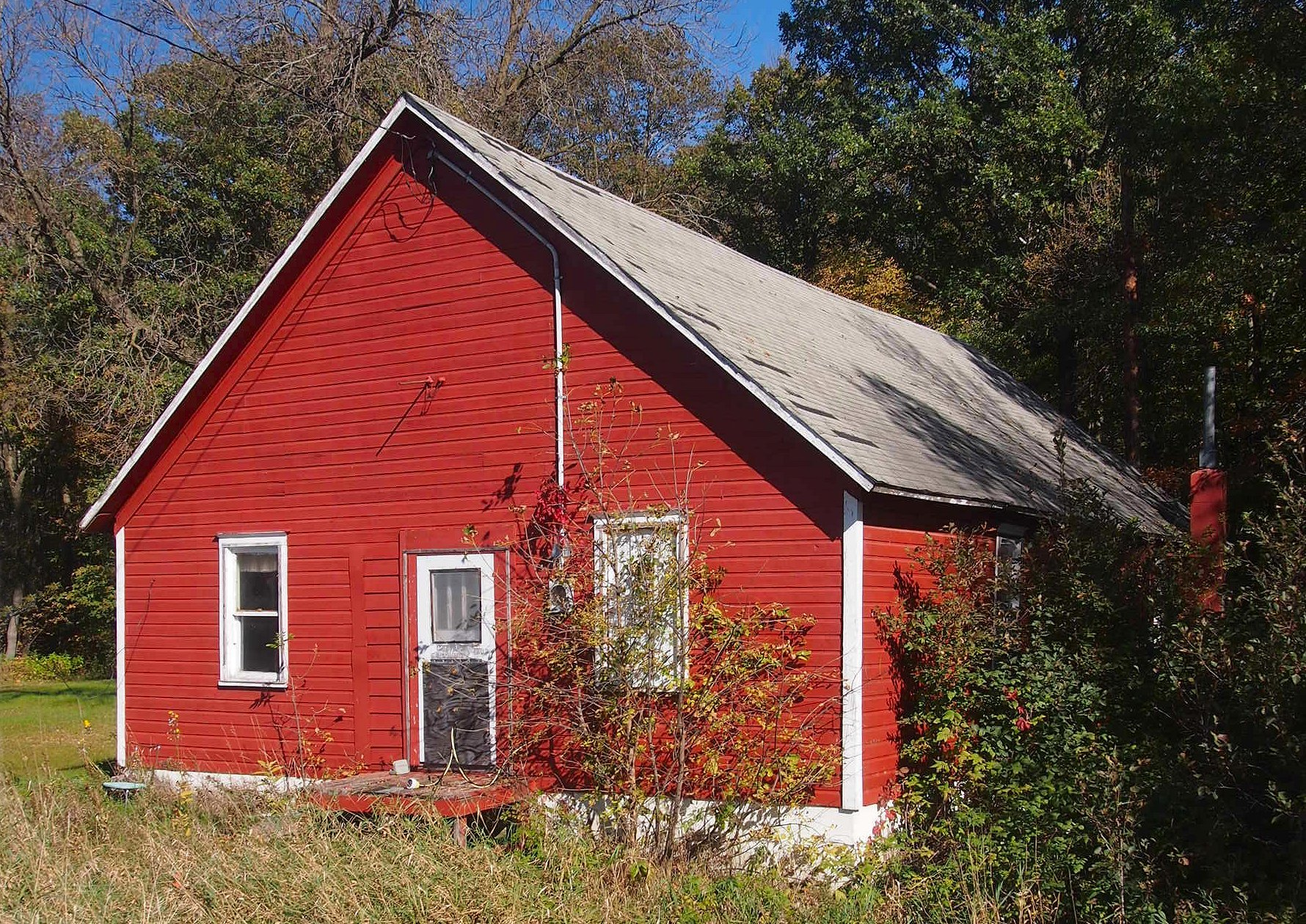
- Germania Hall, a long-serving event hall built in 1917

- Location within the state of Minnesota Germania Township, Minnesota (the United States)
- Coordinates: 46°13′51″N 94°57′37″W
- Country: United States
- State: Minnesota
- County: Todd

Area
  - Total: 36.4 sq mi (94.3 km^{2})
  - Land: 36.4 sq mi (94.3 km^{2})
  - Water: 0 sq mi (0.0 km^{2})
- Elevation: 1,385 ft (422 m)

Population (2000)
  - Total: 474
  - Density: 13/sq mi (5/km^{2})
- Time zone: UTC-6 (Central (CST))
  - Summer (DST): UTC-5 (CDT)
- FIPS code: 27-23552
- GNIS feature ID: 0664261

Germania Township is a township in Todd County, Minnesota, United States. The population was 474 at the 2000 census and 527 in the 2020 census. Germania Township was organized in 1880, and named for the steamship Germania which Paul Steinbach, a German settler had arrived on. The 1917 Germania Hall is on the National Register of Historic Places.

== Geography ==
According to the United States Census Bureau, the township has a total area of 36.4 square miles (94 km^{2}), all land.

== Demographics ==
As of the census of 2000, there were 474 people, 134 households, and 116 families residing in the township. The population density was 13.0 inhabitants per square mile (5.0/km^{2}). There were 151 housing units at an average density of 4.1 per square mile (1.6/km^{2}). The racial makeup of the township was 98.73% White, 0.21% African American, 0.42% Native American, 0.21% Asian, and 0.42% from two or more races. Hispanic or Latino of any race were 1.69% of the population.

There were 134 households, out of which 44.8% had children under the age of 18 living with them, 86.6% were married couples living together, and 13.4% were non-families. 11.9% of all households were made up of individuals, and 6.0% had someone living alone who was 65 years of age or older. The average household size was 3.54 and the average family size was 3.82.

In the township the population was spread out, with 37.8% under the age of 18, 8.0% from 18 to 24, 21.9% from 25 to 44, 21.7% from 45 to 64, and 10.5% who were 65 years of age or older. The median age was 30 years. For every 100 females, there were 100.8 males. For every 100 females age 18 and over, there were 110.7 males.

The median income for a household in the township was $35,227, and the median income for a family was $37,250. Males had a median income of $29,500 versus $19,500 for females. The per capita income for the township was $10,133. About 14.0% of families and 18.4% of the population were below the poverty line, including 22.7% of those under age 18 and 18.2% of those age 65 or over.
