= Batcher Opera House Block =

- U.S. National Register of Historic Places
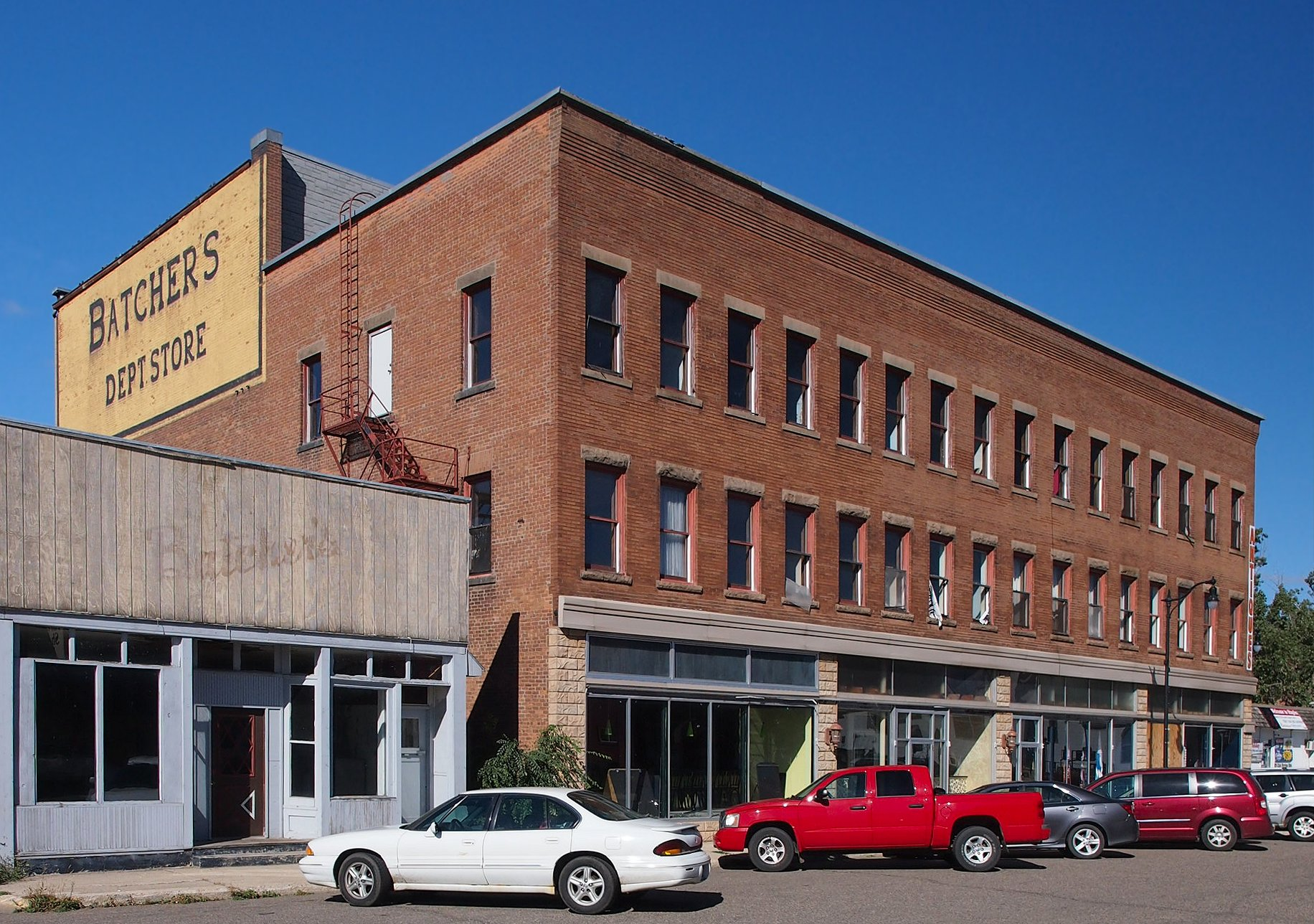
- The Batcher Opera House Block from the southeast

- Location within Minnesota Location within the United States
- Location: Fifth St. and Second Ave., Staples, Minnesota
- Coordinates: 45°58′28″N 94°51′40″W
- Area: less than one acre
- Built: 1907
- Architect: Charles Batcher
- NRHP reference No.: 04000837
- Added to NRHP: August 11, 2004

The Batcher Opera House Block is a historic 1907 building located in downtown Staples, Minnesota, United States. It contained commercial business on the first floor and an opera house on the 2nd floor. The opera house was an entertainment venue that featured live theater productions from 1907 until the 1920s. It was placed on the National Register of Historic Places in 2004.

== History ==
Started in 1905 and completed in 1907, the building was originally intended to house commercial businesses such as grocery, dry goods, and hardware. Charles Edward Batcher, the owner and probable architect, halted construction for more than a year until it was clear that another new building in town, raised by the local Odd Fellows, would not include an opera house. Batcher then decided to include an opera house and restarted construction in the spring of 1907, adding a third story to the design. Yet another new building in town, by Thomas J. Sharkey, did add an opera house, which opened as Sharkey's Opera House at about the same time as the Batcher Opera House opened. Batcher's Opera House was the more influential of the two, and though Sharkey's continued as an entertainment venue, it was lost to fire in 1918.

Traveling theatrical groups had fallen out of favor by the early 1920s as motion pictures became popular and theatrical shows became more expensive. Though Batcher added a movie projector to the balcony of the opera house in the late 1910s, movies ended there in the early 1930s. The opera house was used as a roller skating rink in the 1930s and 1940s, and was used for storage thereafter.

The building is approximately 90 feet by 100 feet. The opera house occupied the second floor, 50 feet by 100 feet with a 24 x 50 stage and a 24 x 24 balcony.

In 2019, the application for the restoration of the opera house began. Funding for the restoration is underway. The project entails full restoration of the 1907 building back to an arts and entertainment venue serving the city of Staples and surrounding communities. Current information on the restoration can be seen on the new website: https://www.batcherblockoperahouse.com.
