= Kandota Township, Todd County, Minnesota =

Kandota Township, Minnesota
- Township
- Location within the state of Minnesota Kandota Township, Minnesota (the United States)
- Coordinates: 45°48′43″N 94°56′54″W
- Country: United States
- State: Minnesota
- County: Todd

Area
  - Total: 24.2 sq mi (62.6 km^{2})
  - Land: 21.8 sq mi (56.4 km^{2})
  - Water: 2.4 sq mi (6.1 km^{2})
- Elevation: 1,289 ft (393 m)

Population (2020)
  - Total: 805
  - Density: 31/sq mi (12/km^{2})
- Time zone: UTC-6 (Central (CST))
  - Summer (DST): UTC-5 (CDT)
- FIPS code: 27-32408
- GNIS feature ID: 0664598
- Website: https://www.kandotatownship.com/

Kandota Township is a township in Todd County, Minnesota, United States. The population was 679 at the 2000 census and in the 2020 census it was 805.

Kandota Township was organized in April 1870 and it took the name of a town site that had been proposed and platted in 1856. The site, which was on the shore of Fairy Lake, never developed into a town although it did have a Great Northern Railway station. It was the first town site platted in Todd County.

== Geography ==
According to the United States Census Bureau, the township has a total area of 24.1 square miles (62 km^{2}), of which 21.8 square miles (56 km^{2}) is land and 2.4 square miles (6.2 km^{2}) (9.81%) is water.

=== Lakes ===
Kandota township has a number of lakes including Lily, Long, and Fairy. The three form a chain wit Fairy, at 306 acres is the largest. Fairy has a maximum depth of 37 feet and a mean depth of 16.5 feet. The lake has a public boat landing on the north east corner.

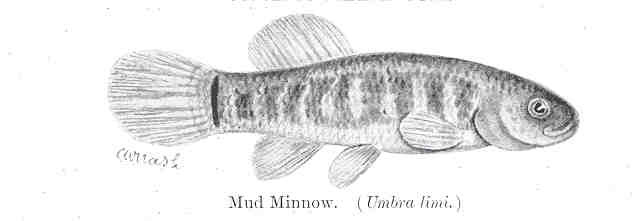
The Central Mudminnow lives in Fairy Lake.

The fish species in Fairy Lake include black bullhead, black crappie, bluegill, brown bullhead, green sunfish, hybrid sunfish, largemouth bass, northern pike, pumpkinseed, smallmouth bass, tullibee (cisco), walleye, yellow bullhead, yellow perch, bowfin (dogfish), common carp, white sucker, banded killifish, blackchin shiner, blacknose shiner, bluntnose minnow, central mudminnow, Iowa darter, Johnny darter, and spottail shiner.

The Sauk River flows through Kandota township several miles south of Fairy Lake.

== Demographics ==
As of the census of 2000, there were 679 people, 237 households, and 188 families residing in the township. The population density was 31.2 inhabitants per square mile (12.0/km^{2}). There were 323 housing units at an average density of 14.8 units per square mile (5.7 units/km^{2}). The racial makeup of the township was 99.71% White, 0.15% Asian, 0.15% from other races. Hispanic or Latino of any race were 0.44% of the population.

There were 237 households, out of which 36.7% had children under the age of 18 living with them, 73.4% were married couples living together, 3.4% had a female householder with no husband present, and 20.3% were non-families. 16.5% of all households were made up of individuals, and 3.8% had someone living alone who was 65 years of age or older. The average household size was 2.84 and the average family size was 3.22.

In the township the population was spread out, with 29.6% under the age of 18, 6.6% from 18 to 24, 24.7% from 25 to 44, 26.7% from 45 to 64, and 12.4% who were 65 years of age or older. The median age was 38 years. For every 100 females, there were 107.6 males. For every 100 females age 18 and over, there were 111.5 males.

The median income for a household in the township was $43,750, and the median income for a family was $49,583. Males had a median income of $31,705 versus $21,607 for females. The per capita income for the township was $17,798. About 2.7% of families and 6.9% of the population were below the poverty line, including 8.8% of those under age 18 and none of those age 65 or over.
