= Long Prairie, Minnesota =

County seat and city in Minnesota, United States

- City
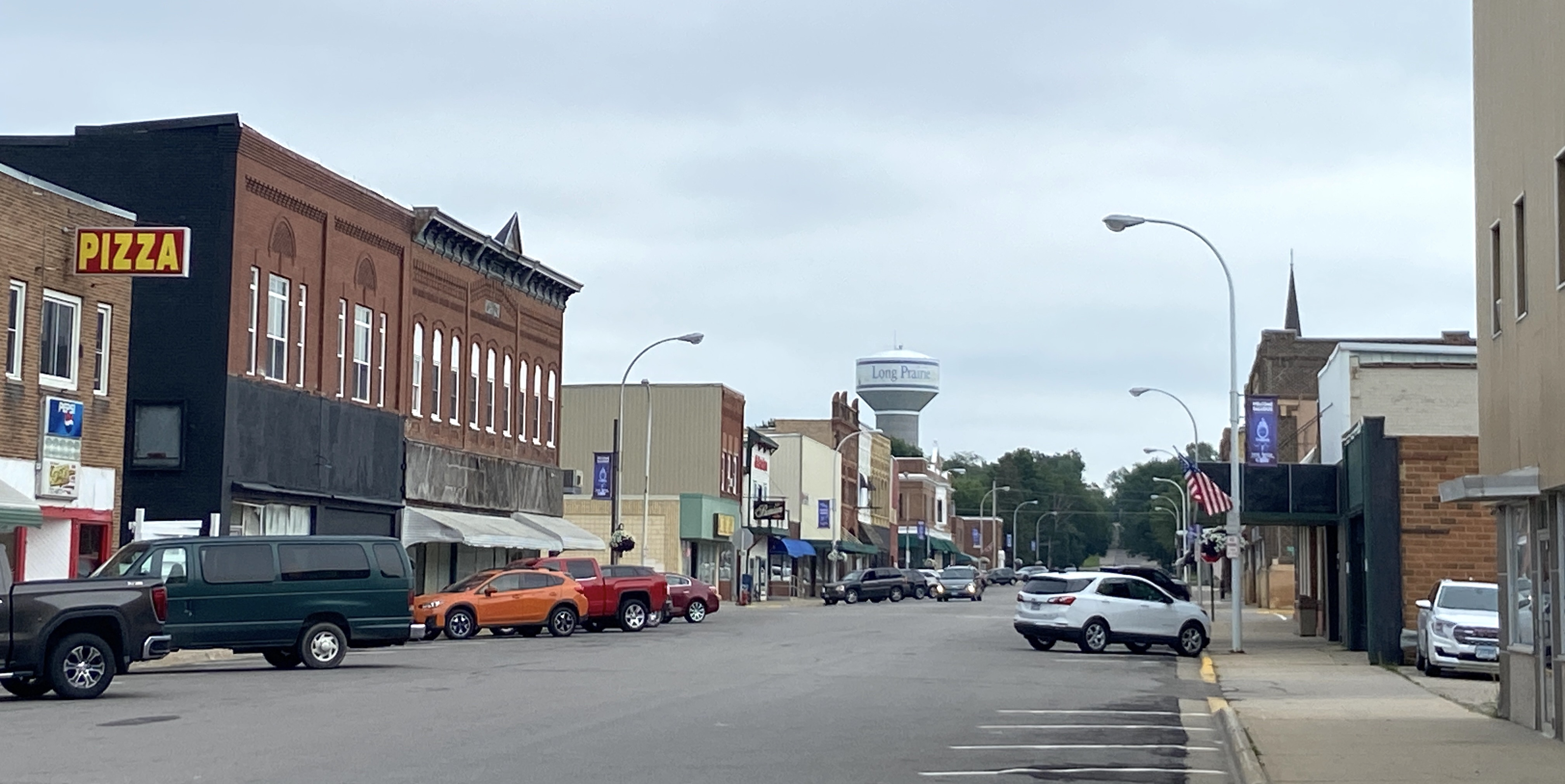
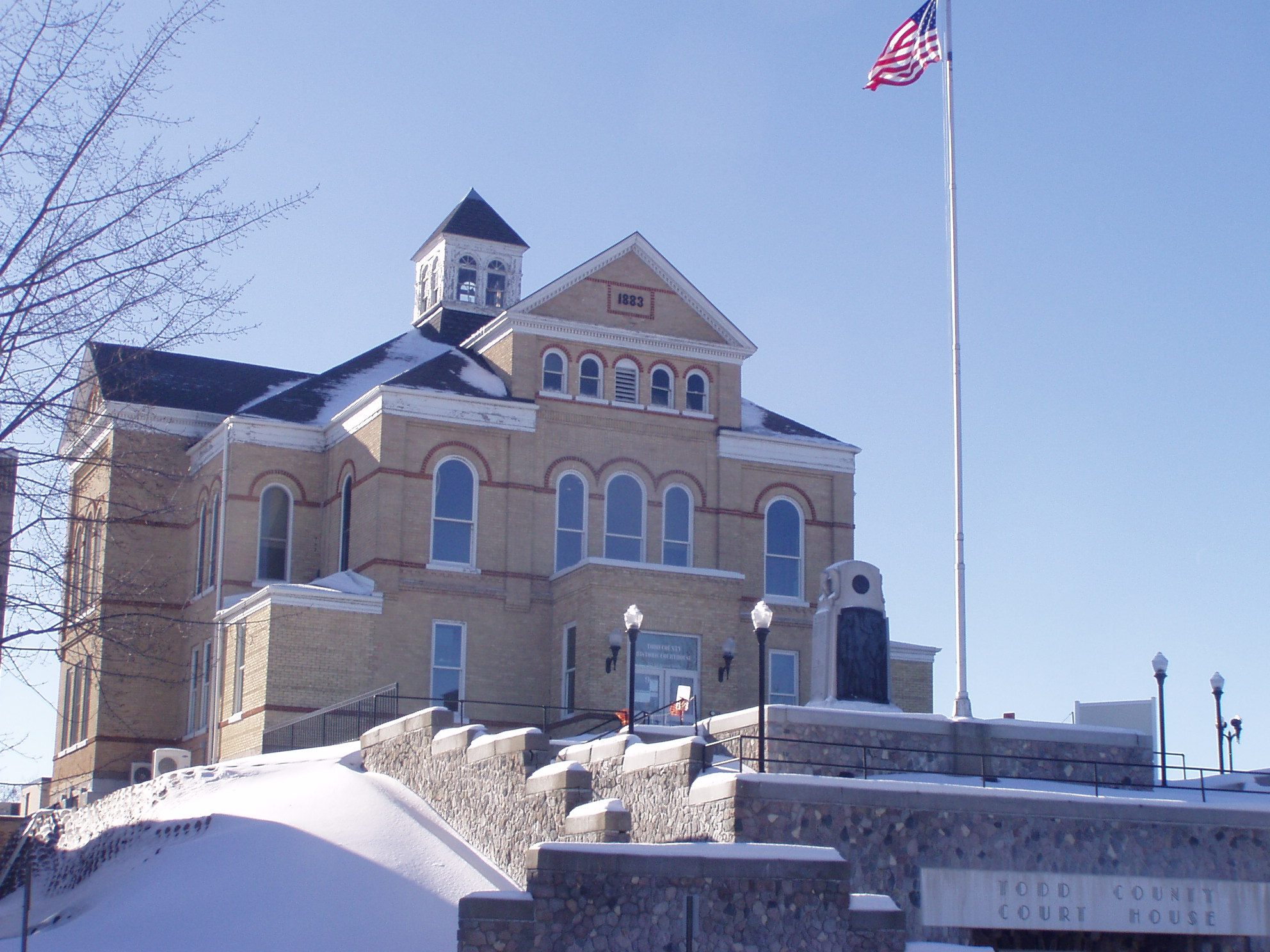
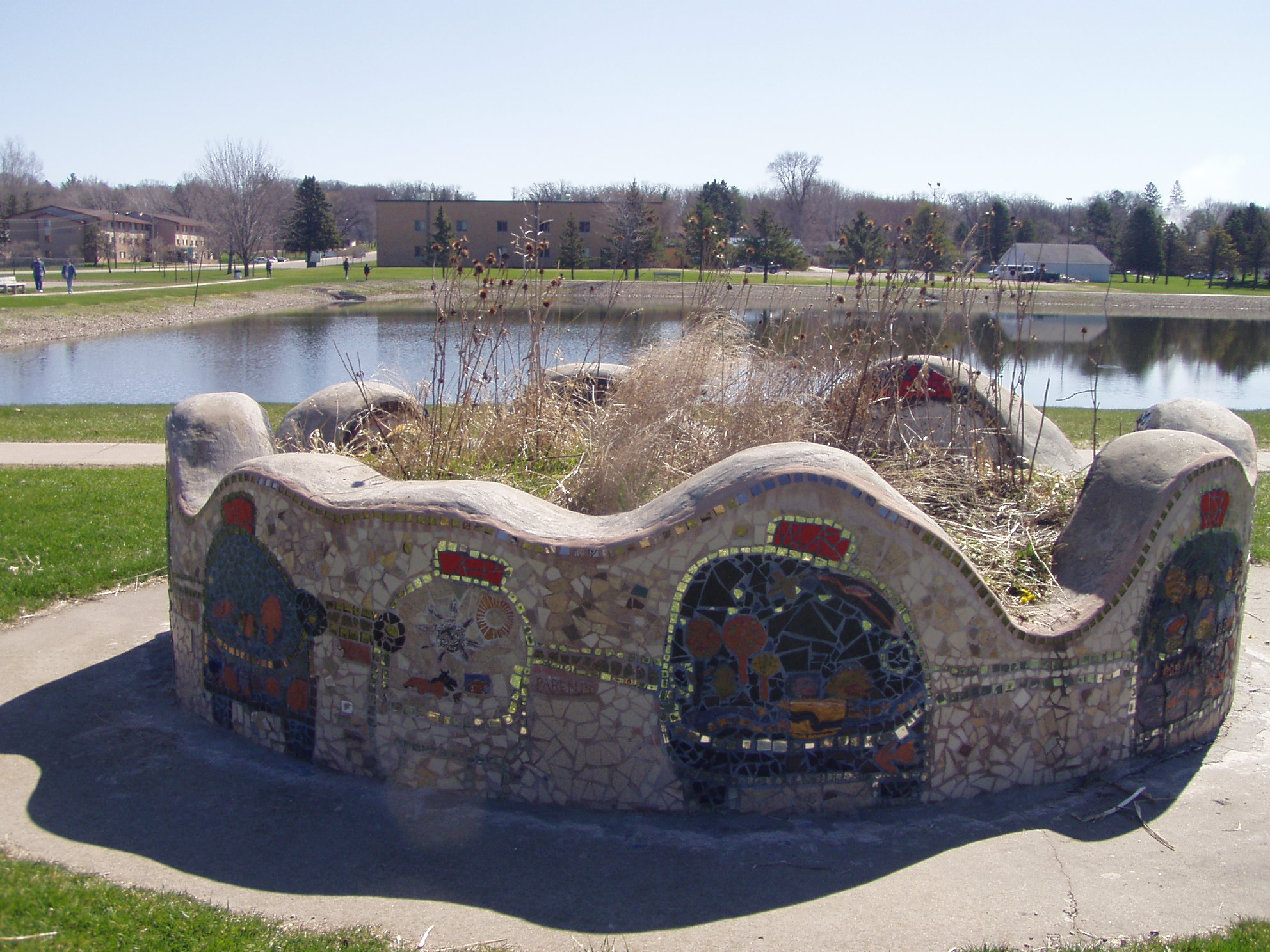
- Central Avenue in downtown Long Prairie in 2024 1883 Todd County Courthouse in Long Prairie Mosaics and pond at Long Prairie's Harmony Park
- Motto: "Expanding Our Horizons"
- Interactive map of Long Prairie, Minnesota
- Location within Minnesota Location within the United States
- Coordinates: 45.9747°N 94.8614°W
- Country: United States
- State: Minnesota
- County: Todd
- Founded: May 1867
- Incorporated: December 22, 1883

Government
  - Type: Mayor–council
  - Mayor: James Kreemer
  - Acting mayor: Lilah Gripne
  - City manager: Candace Bruder
  - Councilmembers: Lilah Gripne; Clint Krueger; JoAnn Schroeder; Gabrier Perez

Area
  - Total: 2.922 sq mi (7.568 km^{2})
  - Land: 2.746 sq mi (7.113 km^{2})
  - Water: 0.076 sq mi (0.197 km^{2}) 2.60%
- Elevation: 1,302 ft (397 m)

Population (2020)
  - Total: 3,661
  - Estimate (2024): 3,710
  - Density: 1,333/sq mi (514.7/km^{2})
- Time zone: UTC−6 (Central (CST))
  - Summer (DST): UTC−5 (CDT)
- ZIP Code: 56347
- Area code: 320
- FIPS code: 27-38060
- GNIS feature ID: 2395758
- Highways: US 71, MN 27, MN 287
- Website: longprairie.net

Long Prairie is a city in Todd County, Minnesota, United States. The population was 3,661 at the 2020 census, and was estimated at 3,710 in 2024. It is the county seat and the oldest town in the county.

== History ==
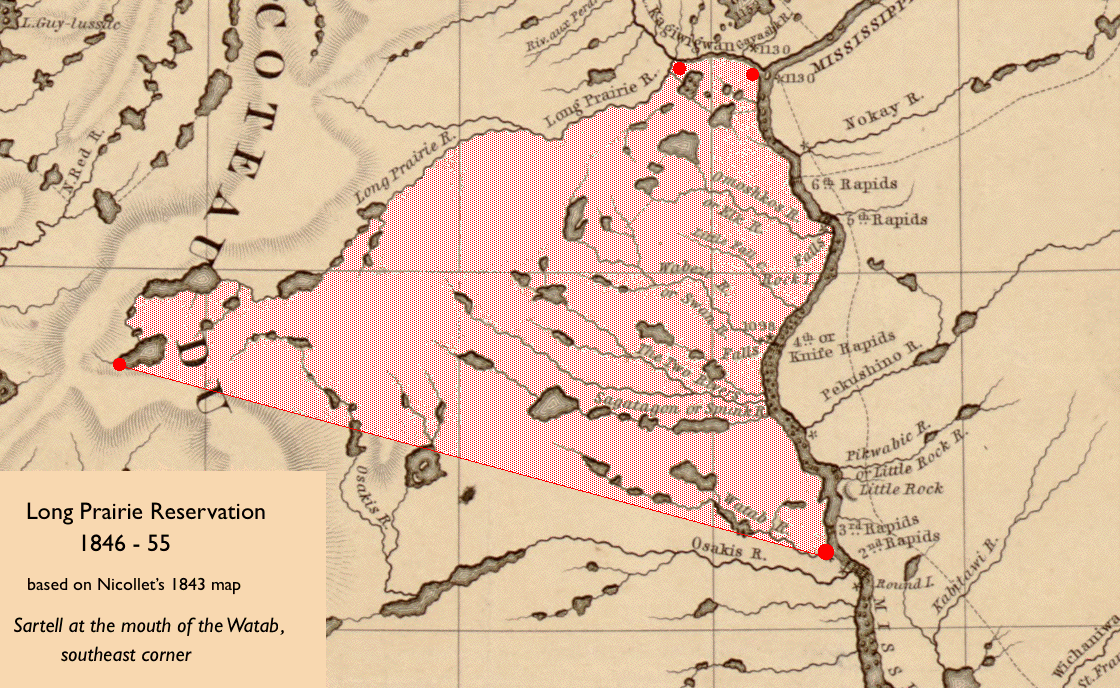
The Long Prairie Winnebago/Ho-Chunk Reservation of 1845

Long Prairie's history dates back to the time when the land was inhabited first by the Sioux/Dakota and then Anishinaabe/Ojibwe Native American tribes. In an 1846 treaty, the U.S. government gave a vast area in what is now central Minnesota to the Winnebago Indians (Ho-Chunk), known as the Long Prairie Reservation. A site at Long Prairie was chosen as headquarters for the tribe. In 1848, the tribe was resettled from the Neutral Ground in northeast Iowa to the Long Prairie Reservation. The journey North was a difficult and long trip, but once at the Long Prairie Reservation, the tribe built a functioning village with homes, a school, and a church. A subsequent treaty in 1855 again resettled the tribe in southern Minnesota.

Long Prairie was platted in May 1867, and named after the Long Prairie River. The river was originally given its name by the Ojibwe/Anishinaabe people. There is a United States Geological Survey stream flow monitoring gauge in the river in Long Prairie.

=== Marshal George Williams ===
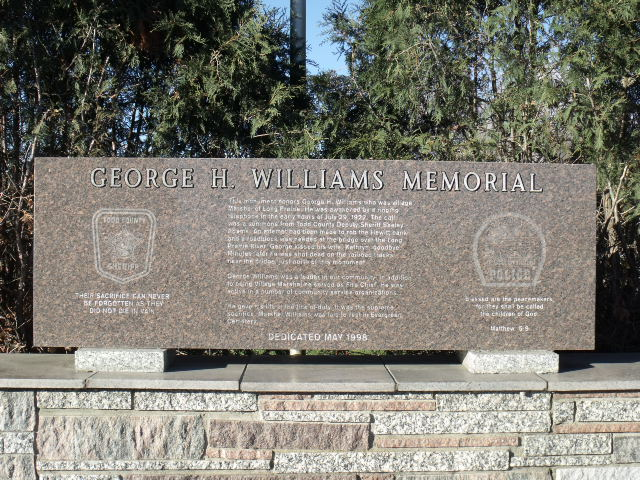
Memorial to Long Prairie Village Marshal George H. William who was shot while duty on July 29, 1922

In July 1922 Long Prairie Village Marshal George Williams was shot and killed by men fleeing a botched bank robbery in Hewitt. The killing took place at a late-night roadblock near the current municipal liquor store.

The text on William's memorial reads as follows: "This monument honors George H. Williams who was village Marshal of Long Prairie. He was awakened by a ringing telephone in the early hours of July 29, 1922. The call was a summons from Todd County Deputy Sheriff Seely Adams. An attempt had been made to rob the Hewitt bank and a roadblock was needed at the bridge over the Long Prairie River. George kissed his wife Kathryn, goodbye. Minutes later, he was shot dead on the railroad tracks near the bridge, just north of this monument.

George Williams was a leader in the community. In addition to being village marshal he served as fire chief and was active in a number of community service organizations.

== Geography ==
According to the United States Census Bureau, the city has a total area of 2.922 square miles (7.57 km^{2}), of which 2.746 square miles (7.11 km^{2}) is land and 0.076 square miles (0.20 km^{2}) (2.60%) is water.

The Long Prairie River, flowing North, goes through the city. Lake Charlotte borders it on the South Venewitz Creek flows from Lake Charlotte and joins the Long Prairie River in the town. Long Prairie is located in the North Central Hardwood Forest Region of Central Minnesota.

U.S. Highway 71 and Minnesota State Highways 27 and 287 are three of the main routes in the city. Todd County Roads 5 and 38 originate in the town.

Geology

An estimated 5.0 magnitude earth quake shook the Long Prairie area in 1860 or 1861.

=== Climate ===
Long Prairie has a continental climate with long, cold winters and generally warm summers. During spring and fall seasons the weather is moderate, with temperatures varying considerably day-to-day. Temperatures can, at the extreme, reach -40 degrees Fahrenheit during the winter and above 90 degrees Fahrenheit during the summer. The growing season is about 115 days.

Climate data for Long Prairie, Minnesota (1991–2020 normals, extremes 1893–1918, 1937–present)
Month	Jan	Feb	Mar	Apr	May	Jun	Jul	Aug	Sep	Oct	Nov	Dec	Year
Record high °F (°C)	57 (14)	59 (15)	83 (28)	95 (35)	96 (36)	101 (38)	105 (41)	104 (40)	100 (38)	90 (32)	76 (24)	71 (22)	105 (41)
Mean daily maximum °F (°C)	17.9 (−7.8)	23.0 (−5.0)	35.8 (2.1)	51.2 (10.7)	64.5 (18.1)	74.5 (23.6)	78.7 (25.9)	77.0 (25.0)	68.3 (20.2)	53.8 (12.1)	37.1 (2.8)	23.2 (−4.9)	50.4 (10.2)
Daily mean °F (°C)	8.5 (−13.1)	12.8 (−10.7)	25.6 (−3.6)	39.8 (4.3)	52.9 (11.6)	63.7 (17.6)	67.8 (19.9)	65.8 (18.8)	57.3 (14.1)	43.7 (6.5)	28.6 (−1.9)	15.2 (−9.3)	40.1 (4.5)
Mean daily minimum °F (°C)	−0.9 (−18.3)	2.6 (−16.3)	15.4 (−9.2)	28.3 (−2.1)	41.4 (5.2)	52.9 (11.6)	56.9 (13.8)	54.7 (12.6)	46.3 (7.9)	33.6 (0.9)	20.0 (−6.7)	7.2 (−13.8)	29.9 (−1.2)
Record low °F (°C)	−45 (−43)	−44 (−42)	−37 (−38)	−7 (−22)	14 (−10)	29 (−2)	35 (2)	28 (−2)	16 (−9)	3 (−16)	−32 (−36)	−39 (−39)	−45 (−43)
Average precipitation inches (mm)	0.98 (25)	0.92 (23)	1.54 (39)	2.73 (69)	3.47 (88)	4.58 (116)	4.64 (118)	3.37 (86)	3.29 (84)	2.92 (74)	1.46 (37)	1.13 (29)	31.03 (788)
Average snowfall inches (cm)	9.7 (25)	9.0 (23)	8.6 (22)	6.1 (15)	0.2 (0.51)	0.0 (0.0)	0.0 (0.0)	0.0 (0.0)	0.0 (0.0)	1.8 (4.6)	7.1 (18)	11.5 (29)	54.0 (137)
Average precipitation days (≥ 0.01 in)	9.2	7.2	8.4	10.3	11.9	12.9	12.2	10.5	10.6	11.1	8.0	9.1	121.4
Average snowy days (≥ 0.1 in)	9.0	6.4	4.9	2.7	0.1	0.0	0.0	0.0	0.0	1.3	4.4	8.9	37.7
Source: NOAA

=== Lake Charlotte ===
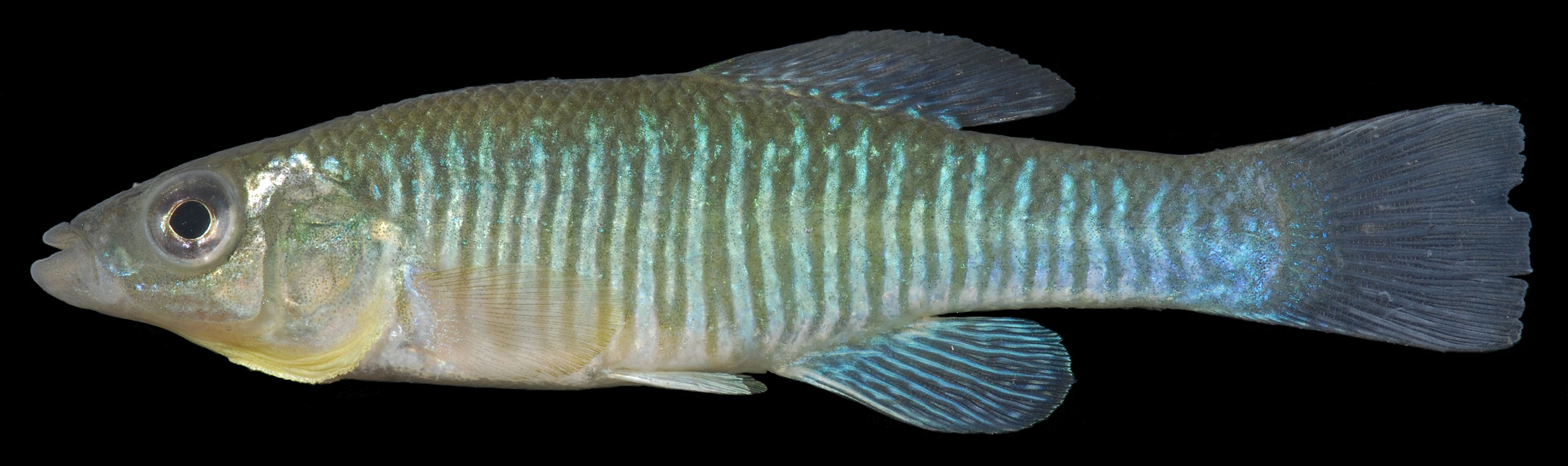
Banded Killifix live in Lake Charlotte.

Lake Charlotte is a 144.32 acre lake on the southern boundary of Long Prairie. According to the Minnesota Department of Natural Resources the lake is 84 feet deep at its deepest. The DNR's fish survey states that the fish species in the lake include black bullhead, black crappie, bluegill, brown bullhead, green sunfish, hybrid sunfish, lake whitefish, largemouth bass, northern pike, pumpkinseed, rock bass, sunfish, tullibee (cisco), walleye, yellow bullhead, yellow perch, bowfin (dogfish), common carp, white sucker, banded killifish, blackchin shiner, blacknose shiner, bluntnose minnow, central mudminnow, common shiner, fantail darter, golden shiner, Iowa darter, Johnny darter, and least darter. A swimming beach and large park, maintained by the city, are located on the north end of the Lake. The lake has a Department of Natural Resources public boat landing and fishing dock in its southwest corner.

== Government ==
Jim Kreemer is the city's mayor as of 2025. The mayor serves a two-year term. City council members serve a four-year term. The city's administrator is Candace Bruder. Long Prairie is in Minnesota Senate District 11 and Minnesota House of Representatives District 11B. It is in US Congressional District 7. The city is in Todd County Commissioner District 3 which also includes Long Prairie and Reynolds townships.

The city co-owns an airport, known as Todd Field, with Todd County. The airport, which is five miles south of the city, is also known as Long Prairie Municipal Airport. The runway is 3,000 feet long.

=== Great River Regional Library ===
Long Prairie hosts one of the 32 public branch libraries of the Great River Regional Library. Great River Regional Library is a library system serving Benton, Morrison, Sherburne, Stearns, Todd and Wright Counties in central Minnesota. It is a consolidated library system consisting of 32 branch libraries, with a headquarters at the St. Cloud Public Library. In addition to the Long Prairie branch, Todd County has branches in Grey Eagle, Eagle Bend, and Staples.

=== Parks ===
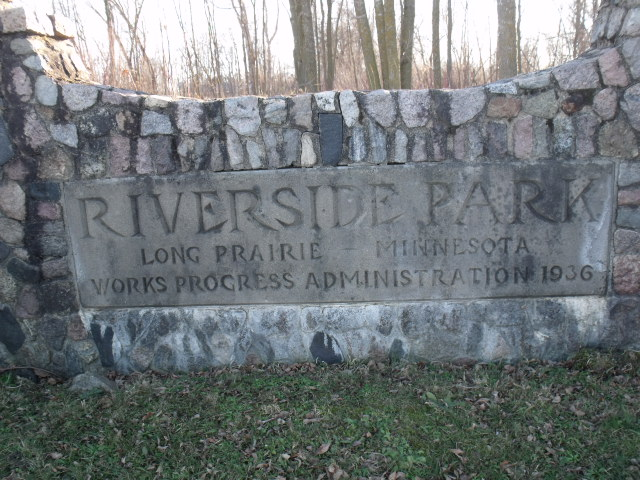
Stone wall, dated 1936, in Riverside Park.

Long Prairie's park system is overseen by a seven-member park board. The following parks are in the city:

- Soldier's Field
- Westside Park
- Locke Park
- Water Tower Hill
- Lake Charlotte Park
- Harmony Park
- Riverside Park

== Industry and media ==
Long Prairie is a food processing center with major food processing employers operating plants in the town. The Long Prairie Leader, which publishes a monthly Spanish publication, is the weekly newspaper. KEYL/KXDL operates an AM and FM radio station in Long Prairie and the surrounding area.

== Culture ==
=== Todd County Museum ===
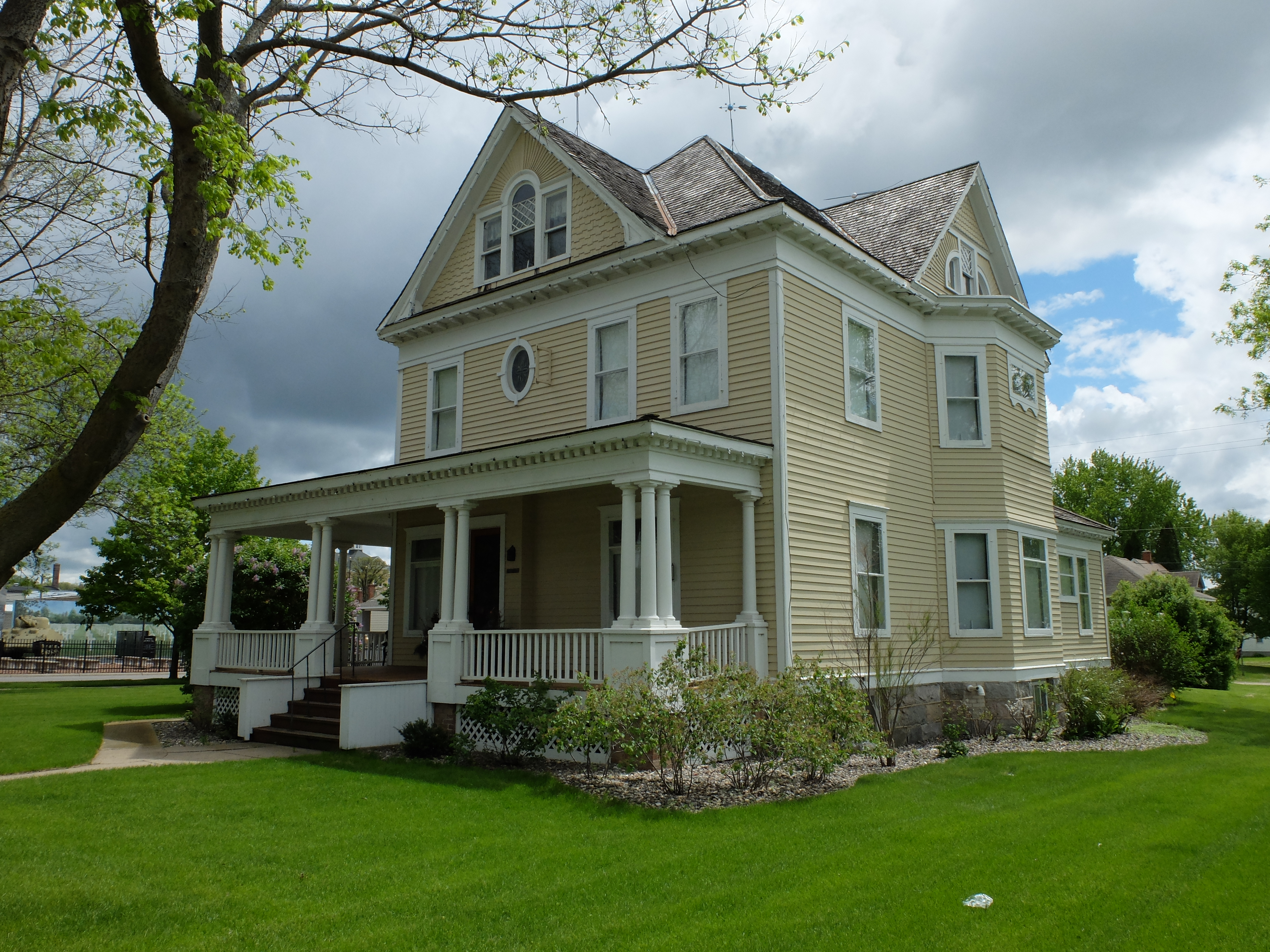
The Christie House

The Todd County Historical Society, a tax exempt non-profit, operates the Todd County museum on the east end of the town's commercial district. The building, located on the site of the former Winnebago Indian Agency, also serves as a research and learning center about the county's past. It houses a collection of artifacts, photographs, and documents that illustrate the life, industry, and natural environment of the area.

=== Dr. George R. Christie House museum ===
The Dr. George R. Christie House is a historic house museum on the west end of the town's business district. The house was built in 1901 to serve as the family home and office of Dr. George R. Christie (1858–1947), the first licensed physician in Todd County. After housing two generations of the Christie family, the building along with its original furnishings, was donated to the city of Long Prairie in 1976. Its purpose was to serve as a public museum. The house was listed on the National Register of Historic Places in 2006 for having local significance in the theme of health and medicine. Occasional tours are given and, in recent years, the museum's board of directors has collaborated with the Minnesota Paranormal Research Society.

== Demographics ==
Historical population
Census	Pop.	Note	%±
1880	220		—
1900	1,885		—
1910	1,250		−33.7%
1920	1,346		7.7%
1930	1,854		37.7%
1940	2,311		24.6%
1950	2,443		5.7%
1960	2,414		−1.2%
1970	2,416		0.1%
1980	2,859		18.3%
1990	2,786		−2.6%
2000	3,040		9.1%
2010	3,458		13.8%
2020	3,661		5.9%
2024 (est.)	3,710		1.3%
U.S. Decennial Census; 2020 Census

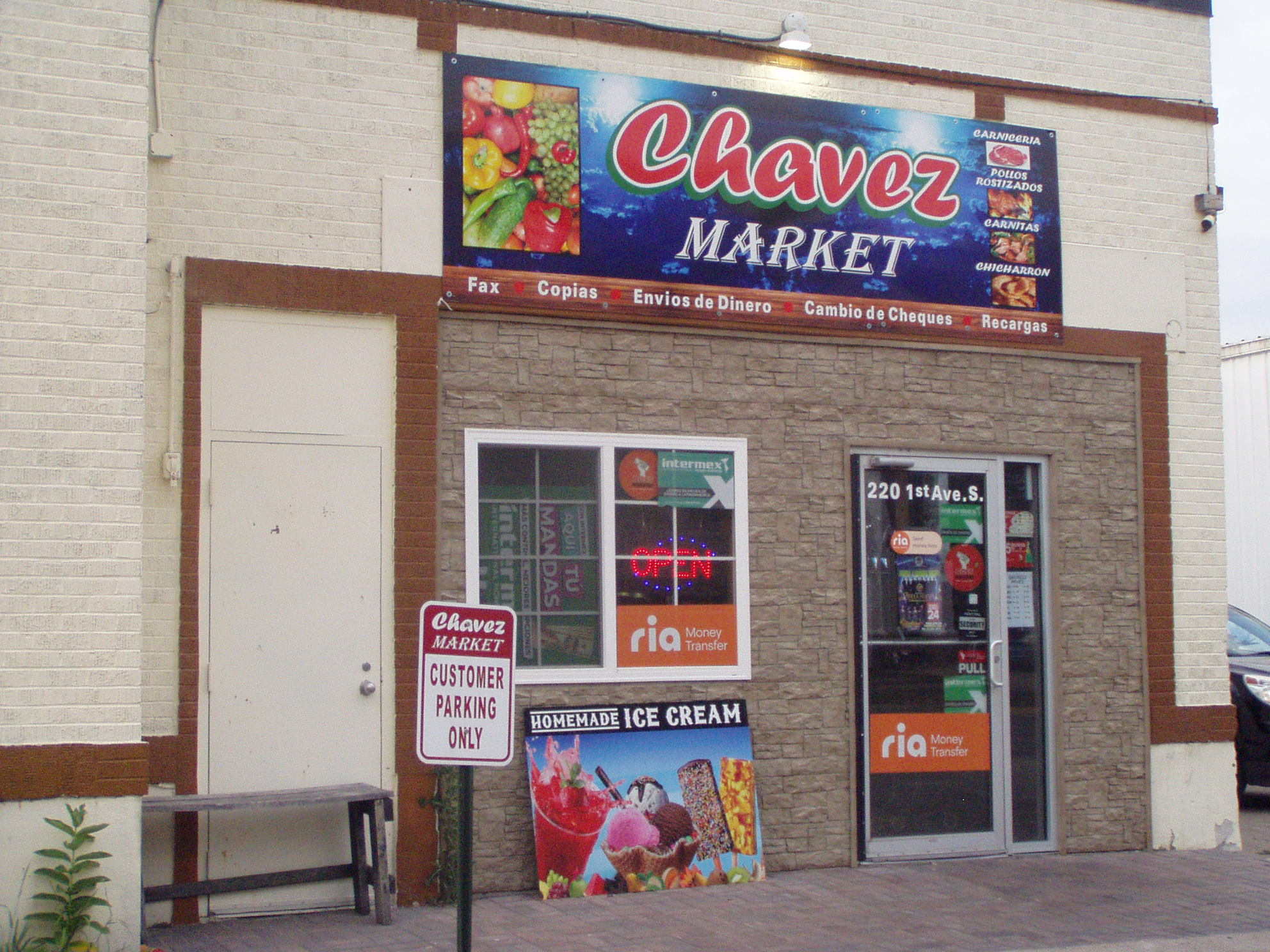
One of numerous immigrant owned businesses in Long Prairie

=== 2020 census ===
As of the 2020 census, there were 3,661 people, 1,357 households, and 842 families residing in the city. The median age was 35.7 years. 27.3% of residents were under the age of 18 and 17.9% of residents were 65 years of age or older. For every 100 females there were 95.6 males, and for every 100 females age 18 and over there were 94.8 males age 18 and over.

0.0% of residents lived in urban areas, while 100.0% lived in rural areas.

Of all households, 35.1% had children under the age of 18 living in them. 41.7% were married-couple households, 19.5% were households with a male householder and no spouse or partner present, and 29.6% were households with a female householder and no spouse or partner present. About 32.9% of all households were made up of individuals and 16.0% had someone living alone who was 65 years of age or older.

There were 1,455 housing units, of which 6.7% were vacant. The homeowner vacancy rate was 1.5% and the rental vacancy rate was 7.5%.

Racial composition as of the 2020 census
Race	Number	Percent
White	2,032	55.5%
Black or African American	45	1.2%
American Indian and Alaska Native	15	0.4%
Asian	36	1.0%
Native Hawaiian and Other Pacific Islander	67	1.8%
Some other race	983	26.9%
Two or more races	483	13.2%
Hispanic or Latino (of any race)	1,561	42.6%

=== 2010 census ===
As of the 2010 census, there were 3,458 people, 1,290 households, and 816 families residing in the city. The population density was 1,324.9 inhabitants per square mile (511.5/km^{2}). There were 1,391 housing units at an average density of 533.0 per square mile (205.8/km^{2}). The racial makeup of the city was 81.8% White, 1.0% African American, 0.6% Native American, 0.6% Asian, 1.2% Pacific Islander, 12.7% from other races, and 2.1% from two or more races. Hispanic or Latino of any race were 29.9% of the population. As of October 2021, 57% of Long Prairie-Grey Eagle students identified as Hispanic or Latino.

There were 1,290 households, of which 33.6% had children under the age of 18 living with them, 48.7% were married couples living together, 9.8% had a female householder with no husband present, 4.8% had a male householder with no wife present, and 36.7% were non-families. 32.7% of all households were made up of individuals, and 18.1% had someone living alone who was 65 years of age or older. The average household size was 2.58 and the average family size was 3.29.

The median age in the city was 34.1 years. 27.8% of residents were under the age of 18; 9.6% were between the ages of 18 and 24; 24.2% were from 25 to 44; 20.3% were from 45 to 64; and 18% were 65 years of age or older. The gender makeup of the city was 48.4% male and 51.6% female.

=== 2000 census ===
As of the 2000 census, there were 3,040 people, 1,229 households and 769 families residing in the city. The population density was 1,285.2 inhabitants per square mile (496.2/km^{2}). There were 1,334 housing units at an average density of 564.0 per square mile (217.8/km^{2}). The racial makeup of the city was 93.06% White, 0.07% African American, 1.74% Native American, 0.10% Asian, 0.03% Pacific Islander, 4.28% from other races, and 0.72% from two or more races. Hispanic or Latino of any race were 9.38% of the population.

There were 1,229 households, of which 29.6% had children under the age of 18 living with them, 48.6% were married couples living together, 9.8% had a female householder with no husband present, and 37.4% were non-families. 33.2% of all households were made up of individuals, and 19.1% had someone living alone who was 65 years of age or older. The average household size was about 2.36 and the average family size was 3.01.

25.4% of residents were under the age of 18, 9.2% from 18 to 24, 24.5% from 25 to 44, 19.8% from 45 to 64, and 21.2% who were 65 years of age or older. The median age was 38 years. For every 100 females, there were 88.0 males. For every 100 females age 18 and over, there were 85.1 males.

The median household income was $28,237, and the median family income was $35,699. Males had a median income of $31,359 versus $20,152 for females. The per capita income for the city was $14,386. About 13.8% of families and 16.4% of the population were below the poverty line, including 23.1% of those under age 18 and 13.5% of those age 65 or over.

== Notable people ==
- Tom Barnard — former host of the KQRS Morning Show, and voiceover artist; born in Long Prairie
- Barry Bennett — former NFL defensive lineman
- Charles P. Davis — United States Army soldier awarded the Medal of Honor for actions during the Philippine–American War
- Jodi Huisentruit — television news anchor in Iowa who disappeared in 1995 and was later declared dead
- Jacob Wetterling — eleven-year-old boy abducted and murdered; born in Long Prairie
