= Hartford Township, Todd County, Minnesota =

Hartford Township, Minnesota
- Township
- Location within the state of Minnesota Hartford Township, Minnesota (the United States)
- Coordinates: 46°3′48″N 94°50′29″W
- Country: United States
- State: Minnesota
- County: Todd

Area
  - Total: 35.3 sq mi (91.5 km^{2})
  - Land: 35.0 sq mi (90.7 km^{2})
  - Water: 0.27 sq mi (0.7 km^{2})
- Elevation: 1,325 ft (404 m)

Population (2020)
  - Total: 644
  - Density: 19/sq mi (7.5/km^{2})
- Time zone: UTC-6 (Central (CST))
  - Summer (DST): UTC-5 (CDT)
- FIPS code: 27-27368
- GNIS feature ID: 0664404

Hartford Township is a township in Todd County, Minnesota, United States. The population was 677 at the 2000 census. By the 2020 census the population had declined to 644 inhabitants.

Hartford Township was organized in 1867. The township shares its name with a city and county in Connecticut and with sixteen townships and villages across the country. A village named Hartford was also found in section 33 of neighboring Ward township. A post office in the village of Hartford was opened in 1870 but is no longer in operation.

== Geography ==
According to the United States Census Bureau, the township has a total area of 35.3 square miles (91 km^{2}), of which 35.0 square miles (91 km^{2}) is land and 0.3 square miles (0.78 km^{2}) (0.79%) is water.

== Demographics ==
As of the census of 2000, there were 677 people, 215 households, and 179 families residing in the township. The population density was 19.3 inhabitants per square mile (7.5/km^{2}). There were 225 housing units at an average density of 6.4 per square mile (2.5/km^{2}). The racial makeup of the township was 98.38% White, 0.15% Asian, 0.15% from other races, and 1.33% from two or more races. Hispanic or Latino of any race were 1.62% of the population.

There were 215 households, out of which 43.7% had children under the age of 18 living with them, 70.7% were married couples living together, 5.6% had a female householder with no husband present, and 16.7% were non-families. 13.0% of all households were made up of individuals, and 5.6% had someone living alone who was 65 years of age or older. The average household size was 3.15 and the average family size was 3.49.

In the township the population was spread out, with 33.1% under the age of 18, 8.0% from 18 to 24, 29.1% from 25 to 44, 18.3% from 45 to 64, and 11.5% who were 65 years of age or older. The median age was 34 years. For every 100 females, there were 124.9 males. For every 100 females age 18 and over, there were 126.5 males.

The median income for a household in the township was $41,250, and the median income for a family was $43,125. Males had a median income of $27,000 versus $23,125 for females. The per capita income for the township was $14,416. About 8.4% of families and 13.8% of the population were below the poverty line, including 18.0% of those under age 18 and 7.7% of those age 65 or over.
