= List of United States tornadoes from May to June 2022 =

United States tornadoes from May to June 2022
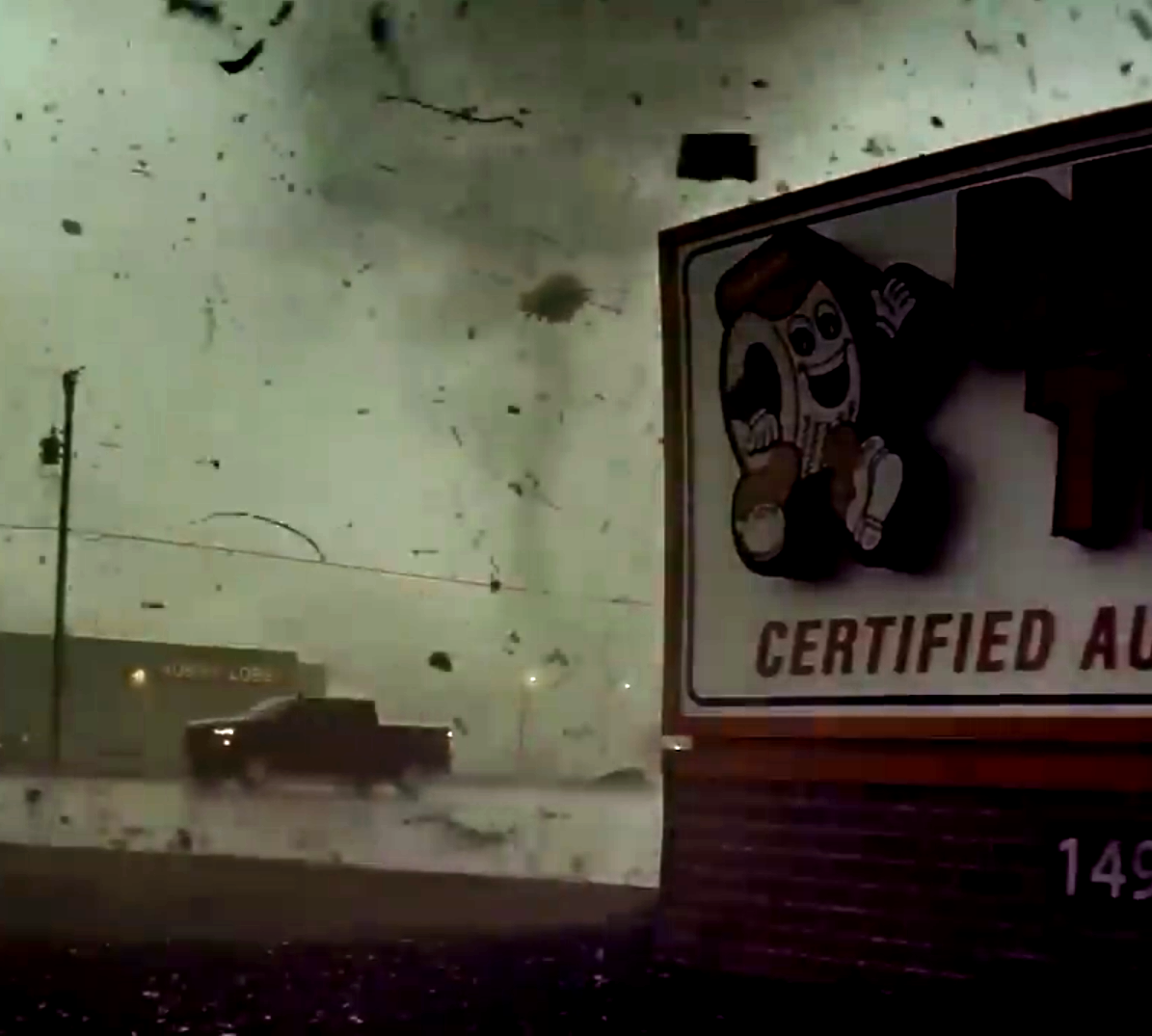
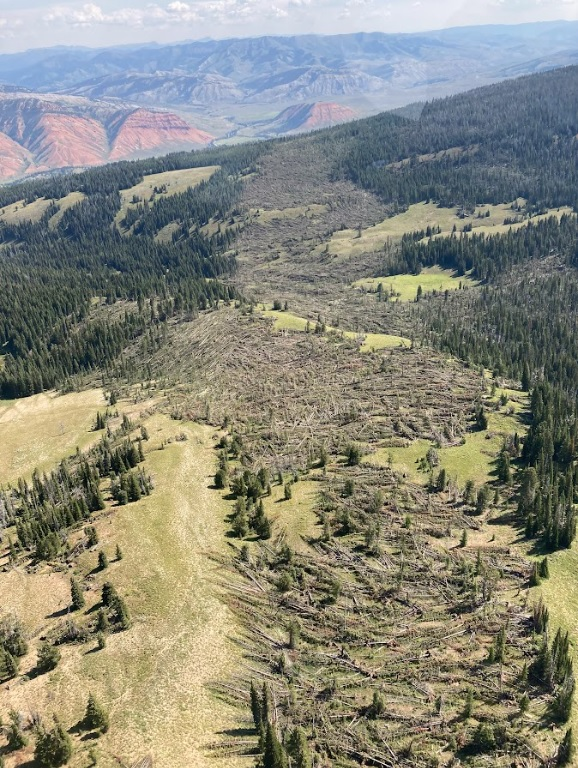
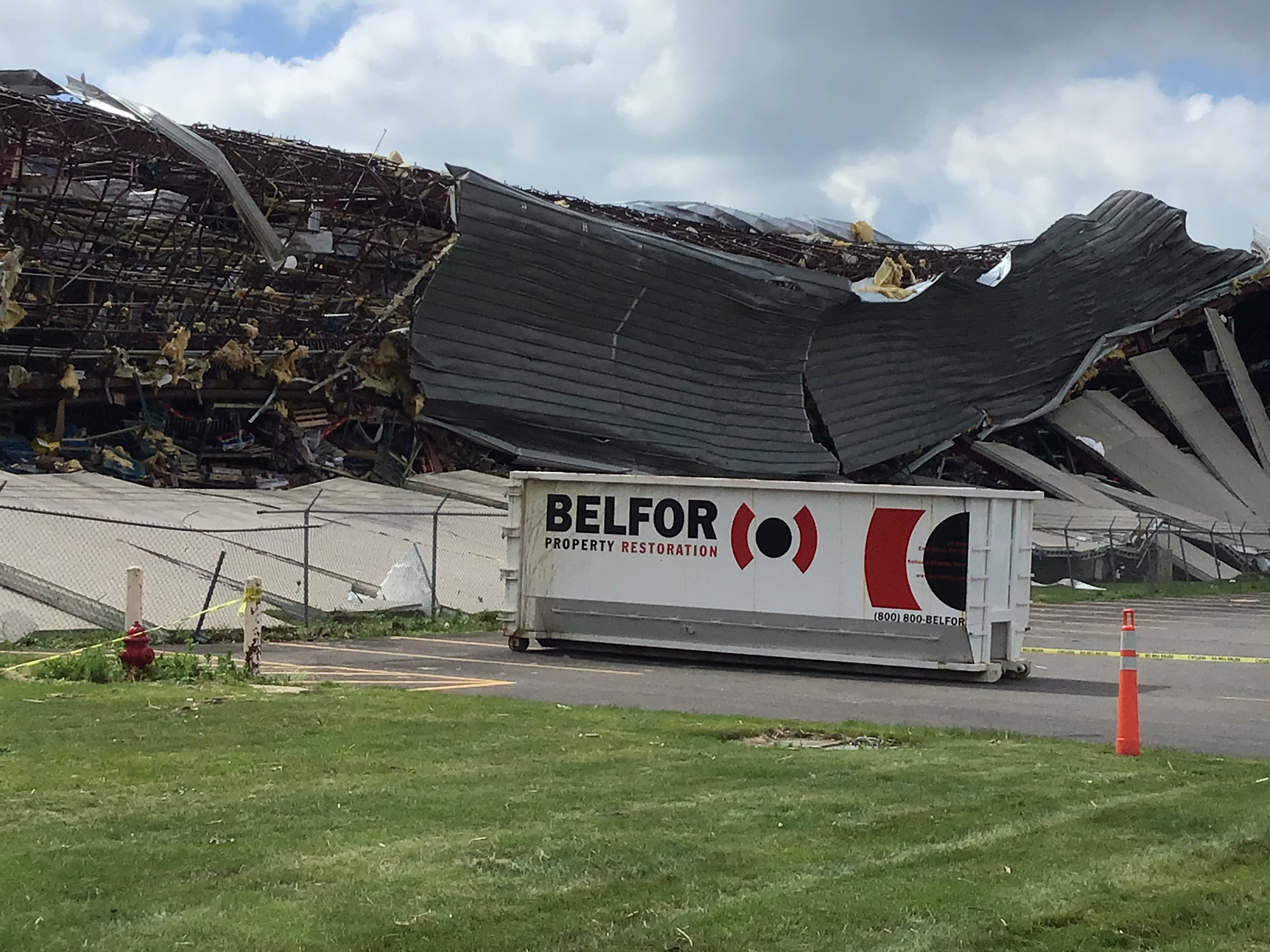
- Clockwise from top: A deadly EF3 tornado within Gaylord, Michigan on May 20; Damage to a Meijer warehouse after an EF2 tornado in Tipp City, Ohio on June 8; Trees blown down after an EF2 tornado tracked over Teton County, Wyoming on June 12.
- Timespan: May 1 – June 30
- Maximum rated tornado: EF3 tornado: Lockett, Texas on May 4; Gaylord, Michigan on May 20; Altamont, South Dakota on May 30
- Tornadoes: 362
- Fatalities: 2
- Injuries: 61

This page documents all tornadoes confirmed by various weather forecast offices of the National Weather Service in the United States from May to June 2022. On average, there are 276 confirmed tornadoes in May and 243 in June. Activity spreads northward and westward in May, with the maxima moving into the Midwest and the Great Plains as the springtime jet stream patterns tend to occur farther north (while the South begins to see decreasing activity), while the potential for tornadic activity also increases in the Northeastern United States. In June, tornadoes are commonly focused across the Midwest and the central and northern Great Plains, and occasionally the Northeast, all due to their proximity to the late spring/early summer jet stream which continues to retreat farther north. Additionally, activity can sometimes increase in the Florida Peninsula as a result of early-season tropical activity.

Although some moderate outbreaks occurred, May was significantly below average with 239 tornadoes. June was even less active with only 123 tornadoes confirmed, which is about half the amount of the month has on average. The two months broke the above-average trend that had been observed at the beginning of the year.

== United States yearly total ==
Confirmed tornadoes by Enhanced Fujita rating
EFU	EF0	EF1	EF2	EF3	EF4	EF5	Total
157	406	466	123	20	4	0	1,176

== May ==
Confirmed tornadoes by Enhanced Fujita rating
EFU	EF0	EF1	EF2	EF3	EF4	EF5	Total
46	79	90	21	3	0	0	239

=== May 1 event ===
List of confirmed tornadoes – Sunday, May 1, 2022 (Note: All dates are based on the local time zone where the tornado touched down; however, all times are in Coordinated Universal Time for consistency.)
EF#	Location	County / Parish	State	Start Coord.	Time (UTC)	Path length	Max width
EF1	Arecibo	Arecibo	PR	18.4589°N 66.746°W	19:10–19:15	0.35 mi (0.56 km)	176 yd (161 m)
EF1	A rare tornado touched down on the north side of Arecibo in Puerto Rico. It downed power lines, snapped power poles, snapped and damaged trees, and caused damage to buildings. A warehouse sustained a partial loss of its roof and a total of 26 homes were damaged.						
EFU	NNW of Fort Stockton	Pecos	TX	31.1341°N 102.9928°W	22:04–22:16	4.55 mi (7.32 km)	100 yd (91 m)
EFU	The tornado formed in an open field and became rain wrapped. No damage was reported.						
EFU	NE of Fort Stockton	Pecos	TX	31.054°N 102.6671°W	23:35–23:46	2.5 mi (4.0 km)	100 yd (91 m)
EFU	The tornado moved over open terrain. No damage was reported.						
EFU	ENE of Fort Stockton	Pecos	TX	30.9188°N 102.7609°W	00:36–00:37	0.21 mi (0.34 km)	50 yd (46 m)
EFU	A brief tornado touched down in an open field. No damage was reported.						
EF2	Northwestern Hermleigh	Scurry	TX	32.6377°N 100.7711°W	00:44–00:53	0.35 mi (0.56 km)	150 yd (140 m)
EF2	A brief, but strong tornado damaged or destroyed several metal buildings and garages, and ripped most of the roof off a manufactured house at the northwest edge of town. Large vehicles, shipping containers, and trailers were thrown, debris was scattered, and numerous mobile homes were flipped or tossed. Trees were snapped, and a pine cone was found embedded in the grill of a piece of farming equipment.						

=== May 2 event ===
List of confirmed tornadoes – Monday, May 2, 2022
EF#	Location	County / Parish	State	Start Coord.	Time (UTC)	Path length	Max width
EF0	W of Protection	Comanche	KS	37.2036°N 99.544°W	20:25–20:35	1.69 mi (2.72 km)	35 yd (32 m)
EF0	A landspout tornado was observed by law enforcement and storm spotters, causing no known damage.						
EF0	SE of Protection	Comanche	KS	37.1024°N 99.3483°W	20:46–20:48	0.52 mi (0.84 km)	25 yd (23 m)
EF0	A brief landspout tornado caused no known damage.						
EF0	W of Loyal (1st tornado)	Kingfisher	OK	35.967°N 98.163°W	21:13–21:14	0.6 mi (0.97 km)	80 yd (73 m)
EF0	A brief tornado, confirmed from photographs, caused minimal damage to trees and vegetation.						
EF0	W of Loyal (2nd tornado)	Kingfisher	OK	35.964°N 98.151°W	21:22–21:26	0.9 mi (1.4 km)	80 yd (73 m)
EF0	A tornado moved mostly over open farmland and damaged a few trees.						
EF0	Southern Hydro	Caddo	OK	35.536°N 98.592°W	21:36–21:38	1.6 mi (2.6 km)	10 yd (9.1 m)
EF0	A landspout tornado was observed crossing I-40 and moving through the south side of Hydro, where tree damage was noted.						
EF1	N of Cyril	Caddo	OK	34.917°N 98.199°W	22:13–22:14	0.5 mi (0.80 km)	240 yd (220 m)
EF1	A brief tornado damaged homes and trees.						
EF1	E of Howe to NNE of Monroe	LeFlore	OK	34.961°N 94.576°W	22:18–22:33	5.6 mi (9.0 km)	1,400 yd (1,300 m)
EF1	A large tornado destroyed outbuildings, blew the roof off an uninhabited home, and damaged another home. Trees were snapped or uprooted along the path.						
EFU	SSE of Red Rock to S of Sooner Lake	Noble	OK	36.364°N 97.087°W	22:57–22:59	1.42 mi (2.29 km)	150 yd (140 m)
EFU	Storm chasers observed a tornado that caused no known damage.						
EF1	S of Ripley	Payne	OK	36.001°N 96.968°W	23:26–23:33	6.54 mi (10.53 km)	500 yd (460 m)
EF1	This tornado passed just south of Ripley. Homes, farm buildings, and trees were damaged, and two mobile homes were rolled.						
EF1	ESE of Harjo to SE of Seminole	Seminole	OK	35.2°N 96.762°W	00:52–01:10	6.3 mi (10.1 km)	700 yd (640 m)
EF1	Shingles were torn from a house, and a higher rating than usual was applied due to the high quality of the shingles. An outhouse was destroyed with the debris blown away, and numerous trees were uprooted and snapped with large limbs carried downwind.						
EFU	W of Tahlequah	Cherokee	OK	35.8909°N 95.0241°W	02:03	0.1 mi (0.16 km)	75 yd (69 m)
EFU	A brief tornado was observed over open country by emergency management.						

=== May 3 event ===
List of confirmed tornadoes – Tuesday, May 3, 2022
EF#	Location	County / Parish	State	Start Coord.	Time (UTC)	Path length	Max width
EF0	S of Rawson to SW of Findlay	Hancock	OH	40.9429°N 83.7853°W	21:31–21:40	7.07 mi (11.38 km)	25 yd (23 m)
EF0	A barn was destroyed and another barn lost its roof, with wooden beams driven into the ground. Trees and power poles were blown down.						
EF1	SW of Monroeville	Huron	OH	41.2123°N 82.7489°W	22:36–22:37	0.43 mi (0.69 km)	50 yd (46 m)
EF1	Two grain bins were carried 200 yards (180 m) and three trees were downed.						

=== May 4 event ===
List of confirmed tornadoes – Wednesday, May 4, 2022
EF#	Location	County / Parish	State	Start Coord.	Time (UTC)	Path length	Max width
EFU	NW of Dumont	Dickens	TX	33.813°N 100.5941°W	22:52–23:02	3.71 mi (5.97 km)	30 yd (27 m)
EFU	Storm chasers reported and recorded video of a small tornado. No damage was reported.						
EF0	N of St. Louis to N of Maud	Pottawatomie	OK	35.128°N 96.855°W	23:23–23:33	4.6 mi (7.4 km)	100 yd (91 m)
EF0	This tornado was observed by a media helicopter and several storm chasers as it moved through areas northwest of Maud. Greenhouses, sheds, and trailers were damaged or destroyed at a cannabis farm near Maud, and minor tree damage was observed.						
EFU	N of Guthrie	King	TX	33.8149°N 100.3299°W	23:34–23:46	8.36 mi (13.45 km)	100 yd (91 m)
EFU	The tornado was captured on video by numerous storm chasers. No damage was reported.						
EFU	N of Maud	Pottawatomie	OK	35.16°N 96.79°W	23:37–23:40	1 mi (1.6 km)	100 yd (91 m)
EFU	This brief tornado formed shortly after the previous one dissipated and was observed by media helicopters and an off-duty NWS meteorologist. No damage was reported.						
EF2	SW of Seminole to SW of Castle	Seminole	OK	35.186°N 96.736°W	23:44–00:14	12.5 mi (20.1 km)	1,760 yd (1,610 m)
EF2	This large multiple-vortex tornado was up to a mile wide at times and moved directly through Seminole, where extensive damage occurred. Numerous homes, businesses, and other buildings in town were damaged, some of which had their roofs torn off, while a few sustained some damage to exterior walls. The Academy of Seminole lost its roof, and multiple trailer classrooms were tossed at that location. Several garages, storage buildings, and older brick buildings were completely destroyed, and many trees and power poles were downed throughout the town. Sporadic damage to structures and trees occurred elsewhere along the path before the tornado dissipated.						
EFU	NE of Guthrie to WSW of Crowell	King, Foard	TX	33.804°N 100.1325°W	00:00–00:19	7.86 mi (12.65 km)	100 yd (91 m)
EFU	This tornado moved over open ranchland where no damage was observed.						
EF0	NE of Seminole to ESE of Little	Seminole	OK	35.284°N 96.612°W	00:01–00:04	2 mi (3.2 km)	175 yd (160 m)
EF0	A satellite tornado to the EF2 Seminole tornado damaged trees and mobile homes.						
EF1	SW of Cromwell to WNW of Okemah	Seminole, Okfuskee	OK	35.302°N 96.499°W	00:21–00:49	13.6 mi (21.9 km)	1,350 yd (1,230 m)
EF1	This large tornado struck Cromwell, snapping trees and power poles, severely damaging a mobile home, and inflicting roof and window damage to other homes in town. Additional trees were downed farther along the path before tornado dissipated.						
EF0	SW of Crowell	Foard	TX	33.87°N 99.9°W	00:40–00:56	9.3 mi (15.0 km)	100 yd (91 m)
EF0	This tornado moved over open ranchland where it was observed by numerous storm spotters and chasers. The only observed damage was to mesquite trees along FM263, where the tornado narrowly missed wind turbines.						
EF1	SW of Okemah	Okfuskee	OK	35.390°N 96.344°W	00:44–00:45	0.4 mi (0.64 km)	150 yd (140 m)
EF1	A brief satellite tornado to the previous EF1 Cromwell tornado snapped a few trees and tree limbs.						
EF1	ENE of Brooksville	Pottawatomie	OK	35.204°N 96.943°W	01:07–01:22	2.3 mi (3.7 km)	100 yd (91 m)
EF1	Trees were damaged along the path.						
EFU	SSE of Crowell	Foard	TX	33.943°N 99.707°W	01:11–01:13	1 mi (1.6 km)	50 yd (46 m)
EFU	This brief tornado caused no reported damage.						
EF3	SE of Crowell to Lockett	Foard, Wilbarger	TX	33.935°N 99.616°W	01:25–02:23	23.1 mi (37.2 km)	600 yd (550 m)
EF3	A large and intense tornado touched down near Crowell and moved to the northeast, reaching peak intensity in rural areas to the south of Lockett, where multiple large steel power poles were bent to the ground and significant ground scouring occurred in open fields. A house lost its roof, outbuildings were destroyed, and trees and power poles were snapped in this area as well. The tornado weakened but remained strong as it abruptly curved to the north and struck Lockett before dissipating, where multiple homes and a church had much of their roofing torn off and several metal buildings were damaged or destroyed, with sheet metal wrapped around trees. A brick commercial building was unroofed and sustained partial collapse of its front exterior wall, and the A&M AgriLife Research & Extension Center also sustained damage. Trees and power lines were downed in town, and vehicles were moved and damaged, including some storm chasing vehicles that were blown off the road when the tornado suddenly changed directions.						
EF2	Eastern Earlsboro	Pottawatomie	OK	35.257°N 96.796°W	01:28–01:35	3.4 mi (5.5 km)	150 yd (140 m)
EF2	This strong tornado moved along an unusual circular path, forming at the southeast edge of Earlsboro before executing a full loop, clipping the east edge of town before dissipating not far from where it touched down. Homes and outbuildings were damaged, and a construction business housed in a metal-framed warehouse building was completely destroyed. Trailers and vehicles were tossed, debris was strewn through fields, trees were snapped, and power lines were downed as well. Three people sustained minor injuries.						
EF1	SE of Earlsboro	Pottawatomie, Seminole	OK	35.261°N 96.793°W	01:35–01:50	4.52 mi (7.27 km)	175 yd (160 m)
EF1	This tornado began near where the previous tornado dissipated, causing additional damage to trees and buildings.						
EF1	W of Cromwell	Seminole	OK	35.326°N 96.509°W	01:58–02:02	1.76 mi (2.83 km)	150 yd (140 m)
EF1	Trees were snapped or uprooted, and a house had much of its metal roofing and siding torn off.						
EFU	NNE of Roosevelt	Kiowa	OK	34.9035°N 98.993°W	02:52	0.2 mi (0.32 km)	20 yd (18 m)
EFU	A storm chaser observed a tornado. No damage was reported.						
EFU	SW of Loveland	Tillman	OK	34.2488°N 98.8319°W	03:22–03:25	1 mi (1.6 km)	50 yd (46 m)
EFU	A tornado was observed by storm chasers. It remained over open country and caused no damage.						

=== May 5 event ===
List of confirmed tornadoes – Thursday, May 5, 2022
EF#	Location	County / Parish	State	Start Coord.	Time (UTC)	Path length	Max width
EF1	NE of Blocker	Pittsburg	OK	35.072°N 95.564°W	07:09–07:13	2.4 mi (3.9 km)	450 yd (410 m)
EF1	Several trees were snapped or uprooted, and some outbuildings were damaged.						
EF2	WSW of Almyra	Arkansas	AR	34.36°N 91.53°W	17:53–17:55	1.53 mi (2.46 km)	300 yd (270 m)
EF2	A large pole barn was completely destroyed and metal truss transmission line towers were knocked down. The likely cause of damage that initiated the collapse of the electrical transmission line towers was a large shipping container, which was lofted and thrown into the base of one of the towers. Other damage included downed power poles and minor roof damage to a home.						
EF2	NE of Henderson to SW of Tatum	Rusk	TX	32.1763°N 94.7395°W	18:45–18:59	8.62 mi (13.87 km)	1,000 yd (910 m)
EF2	One house was shifted off its foundation, and two others houses and two mobile homes sustained roof damage. Two barns were destroyed and others were damaged, and many trees were snapped and uprooted. One person was injured.						
EF0	Northwestern Durant	Bryan	OK	34.012°N 96.417°W	18:53	0.1 mi (0.16 km)	10 yd (9.1 m)
EF0	A brief landspout tornado damaged tree branches in the northwestern part of Durant.						
EF1	SW of Tatum to N of Beckville	Rusk, Panola	TX	32.2408°N 94.5904°W	19:04–19:21	8.28 mi (13.33 km)	500 yd (460 m)
EF1	The tornado crossed Martin Lake. Trees were uprooted and snapped along the path.						
EF1	N of Mount Enterprise	Rusk	TX	31.9814°N 94.712°W	19:25–19:31	3.33 mi (5.36 km)	350 yd (320 m)
EF1	An RV trailer and food truck were thrown and destroyed. An RV carport was thrown 500 feet (150 m), a mobile home was flipped, and other mobile homes and campers were damaged. A house and barn sustained roof damage, and trees were snapped and uprooted.						

=== May 6 event ===
List of confirmed tornadoes – Friday, May 6, 2022
EF#	Location	County / Parish	State	Start Coord.	Time (UTC)	Path length	Max width
EF1	Mobile	Mobile	AL	30.6735°N 88.056°W	07:56–07:57	0.29 mi (0.47 km)	25 yd (23 m)
EF1	A brief high-end EF1 tornado touched down in a neighborhood south of downtown Mobile and destroyed a poorly built Family Dollar store, and caused minor damage to other structures. A sign was snapped and trees were damaged.						
EF1	E of Daphne	Baldwin	AL	30.6044°N 88.8758°W	08:47–08:48	0.26 mi (0.42 km)	25 yd (23 m)
EF1	One house sustained damage to its walls and another was damaged by a falling tree. A large metal building was heavily damaged and two sheds were tossed. Trees were damaged and downed in a convergent pattern.						
EF1	S of Bronston	Pulaski	KY	36.965°N 84.6075°W	17:49–17:57	3.19 mi (5.13 km)	100 yd (91 m)
EF1	Two manufactured homes were rolled, causing injuries to two people, and the Lake Cumberland Speedway was damaged. Many other homes and manufactures homes had roof and siding damage, and a few outbuildings were damaged or destroyed. Numerous trees were snapped or uprooted, including in General Burnside State Park.						
EF1	NNW of Pickens	Pickens	SC	34.939°N 82.738°W	20:14–20:16	0.53 mi (0.85 km)	150 yd (140 m)
EF1	A couple of mobile homes sustained roof damage and a church was damaged. Many trees were uprooted and snapped as well.						
EF1	ESE of Weston	Umatilla	OR	45.787°N 118.283°W	20:44–21:00	2.87 mi (4.62 km)	175 yd (160 m)
EF1	A mobile home had its roof torn off and a farm outbuilding was destroyed. Several other homes saw roof damage. Trees were uprooted and large tree branches were snapped.						
EF1	N of Bryson City	Swain	NC	35.452°N 83.447°W	21:00–21:02	0.45 mi (0.72 km)	50 yd (46 m)
EF1	A brief tornado caused roof, siding, and window damage to three homes, one of which lost a large part of its roof. Trees were downed as well.						
EF1	E of Mebane	Orange	NC	36.0871°N 79.2441°W	21:08–21:15	3.55 mi (5.71 km)	400 yd (370 m)
EF1	The wall of a factory was collapsed, and a detached garage was destroyed with debris scattered. Hardwood trees were uprooted and softwood trees were snapped, including some trees that fell on and damaged homes.						
EF0	NNW of Seymour	Jackson	IN	39.0119°N 85.9163°W	21:44–21:45	0.06 mi (0.097 km)	20 yd (18 m)
EF0	A brief landspout tornado lifted the roof off a barn and threw a picnic table. A fence was also damaged.						
EF0	St. Marks National Wildlife Refuge	Wakulla	FL	30.1135°N 84.1584°W	21:49–21:53	2.51 mi (4.04 km)	25 yd (23 m)
EF0	A brief tornado downed pine trees.						
EF0	Perry	Taylor	FL	30.1114°N 83.5883°W	23:06–23:07	0.27 mi (0.43 km)	50 yd (46 m)
EF0	A brief tornado blew over a fence, peeled back the metal roof of a tavern in town, and pulled up a carport. Tree limbs were broken and bent, and one tree limb broke the window of a house.						
EF1	SSW of Wentworth to NNE of Reidsville	Rockingham	NC	36.3646°N 79.7966°W	23:41–23:59	7.9 mi (12.7 km)	300 yd (270 m)
EF1	A barn lost roofing material, numerous trees were uprooted and snapped, and some homes suffered significant damage from falling trees.						
EF0	NE of Fairfield	Rockbridge	VA	37.88°N 79.29°W	00:40	0.1 mi (0.16 km)	60 yd (55 m)
EF0	The roof was blown off a doctor's office building, the siding of some farm outbuildings was damaged, and trees were downed.						
EF0	NE of Airway Heights	Spokane	WA	47.6576°N 117.529°W	03:03–03:06	0.59 mi (0.95 km)	50 yd (46 m)
EF0	A very narrow tornado damaged and uprooted trees. Falling trees downed several power poles.						
EF0	Spokane Valley	Spokane	WA	47.6479°N 117.3493°W	03:17–03:24	2.14 mi (3.44 km)	250 yd (230 m)
EF0	A line of travel trailers, vehicles, and boats were tossed or overturned. Many trees were snapped or uprooted, and several houses sustained roof damage.						

=== May 7 event ===
List of confirmed tornadoes – Saturday, May 7, 2022
EF#	Location	County / Parish	State	Start Coord.	Time (UTC)	Path length	Max width
EF0	WSW of Aberdeen	Brown	SD	45.43°N 98.60°W	01:12	0.01 mi (0.016 km)	10 yd (9.1 m)
EF0	A tornado touched down in an open dirt field for less than a minute.						
EF0	SW of Aberdeen	Brown	SD	45.43°N 98.52°W	01:15	0.01 mi (0.016 km)	10 yd (9.1 m)
EF0	A security camera captured a brief tornado touch down in an open field.						
EF0	S of Columbia	Brown	SD	45.60°N 98.31°W	01:37	0.01 mi (0.016 km)	10 yd (9.1 m)
EF0	A weak tornado demolished a shed.						

=== May 8 event ===
List of confirmed tornadoes – Sunday, May 8, 2022
EF#	Location	County / Parish	State	Start Coord.	Time (UTC)	Path length	Max width
EF0	SSW of Sanborn	Barnes	ND	46.8493°N 98.283°W	02:04–02:05	0.17 mi (0.27 km)	10 yd (9.1 m)
EF0	A thin, rope tornado touched down briefly near Kee Lake.						

=== May 9 event ===
List of confirmed tornadoes – Monday, May 9, 2022
EF#	Location	County / Parish	State	Start Coord.	Time (UTC)	Path length	Max width
EF0	N of St. Croix Falls	Polk	WI	45.4741°N 92.6532°W	15:28–15:29	0.74 mi (1.19 km)	50 yd (46 m)
EF0	A weak tornado damaged or destroyed a few outbuildings.						
EF0	Key Largo	Monroe	FL	25.0534°N 80.4794°W	20:05	0.01 mi (0.016 km)	15 yd (14 m)
EF0	A fair-weather waterspout made landfall in the Silver Shores community, damaging a dock railing and a coconut tree.						
EF0	S of Hastings	Dakota	MN	44.6497°N 92.8613°W	22:38–22:46	5.71 mi (9.19 km)	25 yd (23 m)
EF0	A tornado touched down in an open field and tipped over an irrigation system. It then tore tin off several outbuildings and downed several trees. The tornado was caught on video from multiple angles.						
EF0	E of Stockholm	Pepin	WI	44.4702°N 92.2518°W	00:10–00:12	1.24 mi (2.00 km)	25 yd (23 m)
EF0	A weak tornado touched down over the Mississippi River and moved ashore, downing a few trees.						
EF0	E of Knapp	Dunn	WI	44.9504°N 92.0619°W	00:25–00:27	0.73 mi (1.17 km)	50 yd (46 m)
EF0	Minor tree and outbuilding damage occurred.						
EF1	N of Rusk to ESE of Colfax	Dunn	WI	44.9192°N 91.8256°W	00:32–00:51	9.3 mi (15.0 km)	50 yd (46 m)
EF1	A house sustained damage to its metal roof, while a trailer and an irrigation pivot were tipped over. Trees and tree limbs were downed, and a small outbuilding was destroyed.						

=== May 11 event ===
List of confirmed tornadoes – Wednesday, May 11, 2022
EF#	Location	County / Parish	State	Start Coord.	Time (UTC)	Path length	Max width
EF1	NE of Fulda	Murray, Cottonwood	MN	43.9142°N 95.504°W	22:33–22:37	3.47 mi (5.58 km)	75 yd (69 m)
EF1	One silo was destroyed and another was damaged. A barn was partially destroyed, and trees were damaged as well.						
EFU	S of Storden	Cottonwood	MN	43.9671°N 95.2985°W	22:46–22:47	0.05 mi (0.080 km)	25 yd (23 m)
EFU	A weak tornado was caught on video in an open field. No damage occurred.						
EF1	Storden	Cottonwood	MN	44.0338°N 95.3368°W	22:47–22:48	0.88 mi (1.42 km)	50 yd (46 m)
EF1	One large commercial grain silo and a small office building were destroyed at a grain facility in Storden. Debris from the grain elevator landed on and damaged a house.						
EFU	SW of Comfrey	Cottonwood	MN	44.0792°N 94.9709°W	23:10–23:11	0.04 mi (0.064 km)	25 yd (23 m)
EFU	A weak tornado was caught on video in an open field. No damage occurred.						
EF0	W of Searles	Brown	MN	44.2215°N 94.4585°W	23:51–23:53	1.53 mi (2.46 km)	50 yd (46 m)
EF0	Minor tree damage occurred, and three outbuildings sustained roof damage.						
EF0	E of Green Isle	Sibley, Carver	MN	44.6386°N 93.9182°W	00:37–00:42	5.49 mi (8.84 km)	50 yd (46 m)
EF0	A tornado snapped several dozen trees and ripped part of a tin roof off a shed.						
EF0	Coon Rapids to Ham Lake	Anoka	MN	45.1844°N 93.272°W	01:29–01:32	3.16 mi (5.09 km)	50 yd (46 m)
EF0	This weak tornado downed trees and tree limbs in Blaine. A few homes had minor roof damage as well.						

=== May 12 event ===
List of confirmed tornadoes – Thursday, May 12, 2022
EF#	Location	County / Parish	State	Start Coord.	Time (UTC)	Path length	Max width	Summary
EF2	E of Estelline	Deuel	SD	44.5731°N 96.8389°W	22:39–22:40	0.44 mi (0.71 km)	40 yd (37 m)	The roof was ripped off a large and well-built dairy barn, a camper was tipped over, and several outbuildings were damaged or destroyed.
EF1	WSW of Thomas	Hamlin	SD	44.7388°N 97.2897°W	22:40–22:41	0.52 mi (0.84 km)	20 yd (18 m)	A brief tornado impacted a residence while the family was outside, forcing them to seek shelter under a tractor, resulting in one injury. A newly built machine shed had its roof completely removed and exterior walls damaged. Debris from the structure was scattered into trees, and the tops of trees were snapped off.
EF0	NNW of Naples	Clark	SD	44.8322°N 97.5491°W	22:45–22:46	0.32 mi (0.51 km)	10 yd (9.1 m)	A barn lost half of its roof, with debris scattered 0.3 miles (0.48 km) away. Large tree branches were snapped as well.
EF2	Castlewood	Hamlin	SD	44.717°N 97.0279°W	22:45–22:49	1.96 mi (3.15 km)	80 yd (73 m)	A strong rope tornado caused severe damage in Castlewood, where multiple homes sustained partial to total roof loss, and a few sustained some collapse of exterior walls. A small and poorly anchored funeral home visitation center was blown off its foundation and destroyed, along with several sheds and detached garages. A school building had a large section of its roof blown off and sustained some damage to the upper portions of its brick exterior walls. A school bus shed was also destroyed, and many trees and power poles were snapped in town. Some outbuildings were damaged and hay bales were tossed outside of town as well. One person was injured.
EF0	NNE of Raymond	Clark	SD	44.99°N 97.9055°W	22:45	0.02 mi (0.032 km)	10 yd (9.1 m)	An eyewitness reported a brief tornado. No damage occurred.
EF2	S of Gary	Deuel	SD	44.7733°N 96.4598°W	22:58–23:00	0.43 mi (0.69 km)	60 yd (55 m)	A brief but strong high-end EF2 tornado struck a farm, ripping the entire roof off a house and destroying most of its exterior walls. An occupant was injured when a refrigerator fell into the basement. The home's attached garage was blown off its foundation, and a pickup truck was pushed at least 6 feet (1.8 m). The family's dog was blown out of the house but survived with only minor injuries. Nearby outbuildings were damaged, and debris was scattered through a field and impaled into the ground. A semi-truck was rotated and flipped onto its side, and trees were also damaged.
EF1	NNW of Gary	Deuel	SD	44.8163°N 96.4886°W	22:59–23:03	2.05 mi (3.30 km)	10 yd (9.1 m)	A barn roof was damaged, and a horse trailer was rolled multiple times at a farm. At a second residence, a tree fell on to the corner of the house and an anchor-bolted single stall garage was overturned, while a second garage to the north lost two thirds of its roof panels. Another machine shed had a portion of the south wall pushed in, and a mostly empty grain bin was also ripped from its foundation and tossed across a road.
EF1	WNW of Rauville	Codington	SD	45.0048°N 97.1902°W	23:02–23:03	0.2 mi (0.32 km)	50 yd (46 m)	A house had its attached garage and part of its roof torn off. An outbuilding was destroyed, with debris scattered at least 0.5 miles (0.80 km) away.
EF1	N of Garden City	Clark	SD	45.0011°N 97.5774°W	23:02–23:03	0.49 mi (0.79 km)	20 yd (18 m)	A tornado touched down on a farm, where a barn lost a majority of its roof and external walls. Some wooden 2x4s from the structure were impaled into the ground, and one pierced through the attached garage of a house. Some sheet metal was wrapped around trees, and debris was tossed about 0.25 miles (0.40 km) from where it originated.
EF1	E of Tunerville	Deuel	SD	44.8841°N 96.652°W	23:05–23:07	0.24 mi (0.39 km)	50 yd (46 m)	A tornado impacted a hunting lodge property, damaging corn, trees, and the main lodge house which lost half of its roof. A camper was picked up and dropped on its roof as well.
EF1	Madison	Lac qui Parle	MN	45.0059°N 96.1859°W	23:09–23:11	0.89 mi (1.43 km)	50 yd (46 m)	A house had its roof removed, other homes in Madison sustained more minor damage, a camper was rolled, and three light poles were bent over at a baseball field, including one that had its cement support ripped out of the ground. There was also extensive tree damage throughout the town as well.
EF1	S of Webster	Day	SD	45.2348°N 97.4948°W	23:13–23:14	0.12 mi (0.19 km)	35 yd (32 m)	An outbuilding had its roof ripped off and interior wall knocked over, with debris was tossed over 250 yards (230 m) away. A calving shed was rolled, an animal trailer was tipped over, and a windmill was overturned and twisted.
EF1	NW of Nassau	Grant	SD	45.0884°N 96.4798°W	23:15–23:16	0.55 mi (0.89 km)	20 yd (18 m)	A machine shed shop was badly damaged along with two sheds on a property.
EF1	N of Twin Brooks	Grant	SD	45.2177°N 96.7813°W	23:19–23:21	1.3 mi (2.1 km)	10 yd (9.1 m)	A calf shed was tossed, a stave silo was moved off its foundation, and a pole barn was severely damaged; its west wall was collapsed, and the south wall pushed in. A wooden grain bin was pushed 300 feet (91 m), and two empty grain bins were destroyed and tossed. A cattle trailer was pushed about 100 feet (30 m) and rolled into a creek.
EF1	E of Louisburg	Lac qui Parle	MN	45.1481°N 96.1252°W	23:19–23:21	1.08 mi (1.74 km)	50 yd (46 m)	A house had its roof blown off and sustained damage to its front exterior wall. Debris was scattered into a field, and trees were snapped.
EF0	WNW of Sunburg	Swift	MN	45.3534°N 95.2893°W	23:50–23:52	2.03 mi (3.27 km)	50 yd (46 m)	Several trees were uprooted or snapped. Tin was peeled off of sides and roofs of outbuildings. Trailers were tipped and various farm equipment were heavily damaged. Some large trees branches were blown away.
EF1	E of Dumont	Traverse	MN	45.7151°N 96.3072°W	23:51–23:53	1.81 mi (2.91 km)	20 yd (18 m)	An outbuilding was heavily damaged, with its debris being scattered 0.25 miles (0.40 km) away. Several large, well-anchored, and mostly empty grain bins were destroyed, with their debris tossed into nearby trees.
EF0	S of New Effington	Roberts	SD	45.783°N 96.9281°W	23:52–23:53	0.33 mi (0.53 km)	10 yd (9.1 m)	Eyewitnesses reported a brief tornado. No damage occurred.
EF0	S of Lowry	Pope	MN	45.6663°N 95.5279°W	23:52–23:54	1.92 mi (3.09 km)	25 yd (23 m)	About two dozen trees were uprooted or broken. A metal shed was also destroyed.
EF0	SSE of Charlesville	Traverse	MN	45.843°N 96.2661°W	23:59–00:03	4.41 mi (7.10 km)	20 yd (18 m)	Several trees were uprooted, outbuildings were severely damaged, and two homes had portions of their garage roofs ripped off. Silos were damaged as well.
EFU	S of Sergeant Bluff	Woodbury	IA	42.3592°N 96.3417°W	00:01–00:02	0.08 mi (0.13 km)	50 yd (46 m)	A video showed a brief tornado crossing I-29 but no damage was found.
EF1	E of Charlesville	Grant	MN	45.95°N 96.26°W	00:07–00:10	2.94 mi (4.73 km)	50 yd (46 m)	Several tree limbs were broken, two wooden power poles were cracked, and two others were left leaning.
EF1	W of Le Mars	Richland	ND	45.96°N 96.72°W	00:10–00:13	3.39 mi (5.46 km)	150 yd (140 m)	Several tree branches were snapped. Two wooden power poles were cracked, and two others were left leaning.
EF1	Northwestern Alexandria to Lake Carlos	Douglas	MN	45.9062°N 95.3967°W	00:12–00:14	2.52 mi (4.06 km)	200 yd (180 m)	A high-end EF1 tornado touched down in the northern part of Alexandria, causing considerable damage in a residential area. A couple of homes had partial to total roof loss, while several others sustained less intense damage to roofing, siding, and windows. Sheds and detached garages were destroyed, and many trees were snapped or uprooted. Less intense tree and roof damage occurred at Lake Carlos before the tornado dissipated.
EF2	SW of Tenney to NNE of Campbell	Wilkin	MN	46.0263°N 96.483°W	00:16–00:25	9.77 mi (15.72 km)	100 yd (91 m)	At least 23 power poles were cracked or snapped, and numerous large trees were snapped or uprooted in and around Campbell as well. Garage doors were blown in, and large steel grain bins at a grain elevator in town were partially caved in.
EF0	NE of Sauk Centre	Stearns	MN	45.7447°N 94.9528°W	00:17–00:18	1.34 mi (2.16 km)	25 yd (23 m)	Over a dozen trees were uprooted or snapped.
EF1	W of Battle Lake	Otter Tail	MN	46.26°N 95.75°W	00:31–00:34	3.60 mi (5.79 km)	100 yd (91 m)	A single-wide manufactured home was flipped, metal roofing was ripped from a storage building, and numerous trees were snapped or uprooted along the path.
EF1	Clarissa	Todd	MN	46.1046°N 94.9627°W	00:33–00:36	3.28 mi (5.28 km)	100 yd (91 m)	Hundreds of trees were snapped or uprooted. Several outbuildings lost roofs.
EF0	NNE of Clitherall	Otter Tail	MN	46.3123°N 95.5963°W	00:40–00:41	0.92 mi (1.48 km)	50 yd (46 m)	A waterspout began over West Mason Lake and moved onshore, snapping several tree branches.
EF0	Cushing	Morrison	MN	46.1159°N 94.6098°W	00:46–00:48	2.87 mi (4.62 km)	50 yd (46 m)	A tornado uprooted hundreds of trees and tore the roofs off two buildings in Cushing.
EF2	SW of Verndale to ESE of Sebeka	Todd, Wadena	MN	46.3581°N 95.0453°W	00:50–01:11	18.20 mi (29.29 km)	500 yd (460 m)	A low-end EF2 tornado snapped numerous power poles and large trees in Verndale and Blue Grass, some of which landed on and caused significant damage to homes and vehicles. Numerous farm buildings had their steel roofing and wall panels ripped off. Turkey barns and other metal buildings lost portions of their roofs as well.
EF1	NE of Cushing	Morrison	MN	46.1664°N 94.5196°W	00:51–00:54	3.59 mi (5.78 km)	100 yd (91 m)	Hundreds of trees were uprooted along the path.

=== May 13 event ===
List of confirmed tornadoes – Friday, May 13, 2022
EF#	Location	County / Parish	State	Start Coord.	Time (UTC)	Path length	Max width
EFU	N of Good Hope	McDonough	IL	40.5798°N 90.6815°W	21:49–21:59	0.15 mi (0.24 km)	10 yd (9.1 m)
EFU	Storm chasers observed a landspout tornado. No damage was reported.						
EFU	SSW of Monmouth	Warren	IL	40.884°N 90.6606°W	22:08–22:10	0.12 mi (0.19 km)	10 yd (9.1 m)
EFU	A landspout tornado remained over an open field and caused no damage.						
EFU	SW of Monmouth	Warren	IL	40.8897°N 90.661°W	22:20–22:22	0.11 mi (0.18 km)	10 yd (9.1 m)
EFU	Law enforcement observed a landspout tornado. No damage was reported.						

=== May 15 event ===
List of confirmed tornadoes – Sunday, May 15, 2022
EF#	Location	County / Parish	State	Start Coord.	Time (UTC)	Path length	Max width
EF0	WSW of Oceanway	Duval	FL	30.46°N 81.65°W	17:44	0.01 mi (0.016 km)	1 yd (0.91 m)
EF0	A brief tornado was observed by NWS employees.						
EFU	NNW of Salem	Marion	IL	38.64°N 89.01°W	20:54–20:55	0.11 mi (0.18 km)	30 yd (27 m)
EFU	A brief tornado was caught on video lifting dirt into the air. No damage was reported.						

=== May 16 event ===
List of confirmed tornadoes – Monday, May 16, 2022
EF#	Location	County / Parish	State	Start Coord.	Time (UTC)	Path length	Max width
EF1	North Charlestown to SSW of Claremont	Sullivan	NH	43.3086°N 72.3878°W	22:22–22:28	4.8 mi (7.7 km)	330 yd (300 m)
EF1	About one thousand hardwood and softwood trees were snapped or uprooted by this low-end EF1 tornado, which was also caught on a car dash cam.						
EF0	S of Powell	Logan	CO	40.73°N 102.99°W	00:19–00:20	0.1 mi (0.16 km)	20 yd (18 m)
EF0	A trained spotter reported a landspout tornado; no damage was observed.						
EF1	WNW of New Bern	Craven	NC	35.17°N 77.18°W	00:20	0.1 mi (0.16 km)	80 yd (73 m)
EF1	A brief tornado ripped half the metal roof off a house. A metal carport was lofted, and debris was tossed up to 150 yards (140 m). Several trees were snapped, and crops were damaged as well.						
EFU	NW of Grant	Perkins	NE	40.9°N 101.79°W	01:41	0.01 mi (0.016 km)	10 yd (9.1 m)
EFU	A landspout tornado was reported and photographed. No damage was reported.						
EF0	S of Big Springs	Deuel	NE	41.06°N 102.07°W	01:52	0.01 mi (0.016 km)	10 yd (9.1 m)
EF0	The public reported a landspout near I-80. No damage was reported.						

=== May 17 event ===
List of confirmed tornadoes – Tuesday, May 17, 2022
EF#	Location	County / Parish	State	Start Coord.	Time (UTC)	Path length	Max width
EFU	NNW of Norcatur	Decatur	KS	39.9545°N 100.2829°W	21:43–21:52	1.84 mi (2.96 km)	100 yd (91 m)
EFU	A landspout tornado remained over open fields and no damage was reported.						
EFU	NNW of Wilsonville	Furnas	NE	40.16°N 100.13°W	22:10	0.01 mi (0.016 km)	20 yd (18 m)
EFU	Landspout tornado reported by an emergency manager.						
EFU	SSW of Beaver City	Furnas	NE	40.03°N 99.88°W	22:14	0.01 mi (0.016 km)	20 yd (18 m)
EFU	A storm chaser reported a landspout tornado.						
EFU	N of Park	Gove	KS	39.1297°N 100.3664°W	00:46–00:51	0.56 mi (0.90 km)	50 yd (46 m)
EFU	A firefighter reported a landspout tornado.						
EFU	SE of Landa	Bottineau	ND	48.86°N 100.83°W	00:47–00:49	0.33 mi (0.53 km)	50 yd (46 m)
EFU	A tornado touched down in an open field and impacted no structures.						

=== May 18 event ===
List of confirmed tornadoes – Wednesday, May 18, 2022
EF#	Location	County / Parish	State	Start Coord.	Time (UTC)	Path length	Max width
EF0	NE of Rice Lake	St. Louis	MN	46.9438°N 92.0955°W	21:16–21:19	3.1 mi (5.0 km)	50 yd (46 m)
EF0	Numerous trees were damaged.						

=== May 19 event ===
List of confirmed tornadoes – Thursday, May 19, 2022
EF#	Location	County / Parish	State	Start Coord.	Time (UTC)	Path length	Max width
EF1	NW of Beulah	Phelps	MO	37.63°N 92.01°W	19:54–19:59	2.96 mi (4.76 km)	200 yd (180 m)
EF1	Several small outbuildings were destroyed, and numerous trees were snapped or uprooted.						
EF1	N of Lecoma	Phelps	MO	37.85°N 91.7488°W	20:19–20:21	0.97 mi (1.56 km)	100 yd (91 m)
EF1	Numerous trees were snapped or uprooted.						
EF0	SW of St. Clair	Franklin	MO	38.305°N 91.041°W	21:16–21:18	2.53 mi (4.07 km)	50 yd (46 m)
EF0	Trees were uprooted and tree limbs were broken.						
EF1	S of Leslie	Franklin	MO	38.378°N 91.224°W	21:23–21:25	1.27 mi (2.04 km)	100 yd (91 m)
EF1	Trees were snapped and uprooted.						
EF0	E of Eureka	St. Louis	MO	38.505°N 90.5753°W	21:50–21:51	0.14 mi (0.23 km)	20 yd (18 m)
EF0	A brief tornado snapped a dead tree and a large tree branch.						
EF0	Kirkwood to S of Ladue	St. Louis	MO	38.582°N 90.398°W	21:58–22:03	3.01 mi (4.84 km)	75 yd (69 m)
EF0	Trees were damaged, one of which fell on a home, causing damage.						
EF0	Frontenac to Creve Coeur	St. Louis	MO	38.63°N 90.418°W	22:03–22:04	1.32 mi (2.12 km)	50 yd (46 m)
EF0	Trees were uprooted and tree limbs were broken.						
EF0	Creve Coeur	St. Louis	MO	38.679°N 90.47°W	22:06–22:07	0.79 mi (1.27 km)	50 yd (46 m)
EF0	Trees were uprooted and tree limbs were broken.						
EF0	N of Summerfield	St. Clair	IL	38.614°N 89.751°W	22:44–22:45	0.23 mi (0.37 km)	50 yd (46 m)
EF0	Trees were damaged at a residence.						
EF0	E of Okawville	Washington	IL	38.424°N 89.50°W	22:53–22:54	1.65 mi (2.66 km)	50 yd (46 m)
EF0	A shed was destroyed and a few outbuildings lost roof and wall panels. Wheat was flattened in a field.						
EF1	N of Breese to Southern Greenville	Clinton, Bond	IL	38.663°N 89.519°W	22:57–23:16	16.65 mi (26.80 km)	250 yd (230 m)
EF1	Several houses sustained damage to their roofs, siding, and gutters. Three barns were destroyed and several others were damaged. A trailer was overturned, and trees were snapped and uprooted along the path, including at the south edge of Greenville before the tornado dissipated.						
EF0	SE of Sparta	Monroe	WI	43.8881°N 90.7469°W	01:20–01:21	0.28 mi (0.45 km)	60 yd (55 m)
EF0	A brief tornado tossed a trailer and damaged a house, outbuilding, and trees.						
EF2	SW of Keensburg, IL to W of Iona, IN	Wabash (IL), Gibson (IN), Knox (IN)	IL, IN	38.3439°N 87.8778°W	02:31–03:03	26.85 mi (43.21 km)	300 yd (270 m)
EF2	Numerous large trees were snapped or uprooted, many of which fell on structures. Dozens of power poles were snapped as well, barns were destroyed, and several pivot irrigation systems were flipped. The tornado crossed the White River seven times and moved across the southeastern edge of Mount Carmel, Illinois, where many trees were downed, and a metal building sustained damage to its roof and garage doors. Past Mount Carmel, the tornado downed additional trees in Decker, Indiana, before dissipating near Iona.						

=== May 20 event ===
List of confirmed tornadoes – Friday, May 20, 2022
EF#	Location	County / Parish	State	Start Coord.	Time (UTC)	Path length	Max width
EF3	E of Alba to ENE of Gaylord	Antrim, Otsego	MI	44.9743°N 84.8794°W	19:35–19:57	17.54 mi (28.23 km)	200 yd (180 m)
EF3	2022 Gaylord tornado — 2 deaths – A destructive non-condensed multi-vortex tornado, the first tornado rated EF3 in Michigan since 2012, caused severe damage as it moved directly through Gaylord. Several mobile homes were thrown and destroyed at a mobile home park as the tornado entered the city, resulting in two fatalities at that location. In other residential areas of town, dozens of frame homes were badly damaged or shifted completely off their foundations, others had their roofs ripped off and exterior walls collapsed, and one was left with only a few walls standing. Many business, including Culver's, Hobby Lobby, Jimmy John's and Goodwill sustained major structural damage, including roof and exterior wall loss. An automotive oil change business was completely destroyed, and the back wall of a Maurices collapsed, leading to the failure of the structure's roof and support beams. Several metal buildings and warehouses were also significantly damaged, many RVs were thrown and demolished at a sales lot, and projectiles were impaled into vehicles and the exterior walls of buildings. Cars were flipped and tossed in parking lots, while many power poles and large trees were snapped. The tornado also caused damage in rural areas outside of Gaylord, where barns and outbuildings were destroyed, a few homes were heavily damaged, and trees and power lines were downed. In addition to the two deaths, a total of 44 people were injured. This was the first tornado to ever strike the town since official tornado records began in 1950.						
EF0	Aberdeen	Monmouth	NJ	40.415°N 74.211°W	21:09–21:10	0.84 mi (1.35 km)	225 yd (206 m)
EF0	Numerous trees were snapped or uprooted by this brief tornado, some of which caused additional damage to power lines, power poles, and one house upon falling. At least a dozen other homes sustained damage to their vinyl siding, soffit, gutters, or roof shingles. Several vinyl fence sections were blown down.						

=== May 21 event ===
List of confirmed tornadoes – Saturday, May 21, 2022
EF#	Location	County / Parish	State	Start Coord.	Time (UTC)	Path length	Max width
EF0	NE of Nashville	Brown	IN	39.2795°N 86.1359°W	19:40–19:42	0.3 mi (0.48 km)	25 yd (23 m)
EF0	Numerous trees were downed.						
EF0	NNE of Mossville	Newton	AR	35.91°N 93.38°W	19:45–19:48	1.04 mi (1.67 km)	100 yd (91 m)
EF0	A tornado was observed by a residence but remained in an inaccessible area, causing no known damage.						
EF0	W of Edinburgh	Johnson	IN	39.3524°N 86.0329°W	19:48–19:49	0.1 mi (0.16 km)	25 yd (23 m)
EF0	A brief tornado struck a church, where a steeple was blown over, roofing was blown downstream, and a trailer and dumpsters in the parking lot were moved to the north.						
EF1	NE of Edinburgh to W of Waldron	Shelby	IN	39.388°N 85.951°W	19:57–20:12	14.6 mi (23.5 km)	100 yd (91 m)
EF1	Trees were downed intermittently along the path.						
EF1	ENE of Edinburgh	Shelby	IN	39.375°N 85.907°W	19:58–19:59	0.23 mi (0.37 km)	25 yd (23 m)
EF1	Trees were snapped and uprooted.						
EFU	S of Royal	Garland	AR	34.4608°N 93.2497°W	00:00–00:01	0.1 mi (0.16 km)	50 yd (46 m)
EFU	A very brief tornado was caught on video. No damage was reported.						

=== May 22 event ===
List of confirmed tornadoes – Sunday, May 22, 2022
EF#	Location	County / Parish	State	Start Coord.	Time (UTC)	Path length	Max width
EF1	NW of Hosston	Caddo	LA	32.9084°N 93.931°W	05:12–05:15	1.57 mi (2.53 km)	200 yd (180 m)
EF1	A QLCS tornado developed as a waterspout over Black Lake Bayou before moving ashore. Many trees were snapped, twisted, or uprooted, with a few falling on homes.						

=== May 23 event ===
List of confirmed tornadoes – Monday, May 23, 2022
EF#	Location	County / Parish	State	Start Coord.	Time (UTC)	Path length	Max width
EF1	ESE of Hidden Valley to S of Concord	Mecklenburg, Cabarrus	NC	35.246°N 80.714°W	13:36–13:54	9.76 mi (15.71 km)	100 yd (91 m)
EF1	Roofs were damaged, and trees and utility poles were downed in the Harrisburg area.						
EF0	W of Gorman	Durham	NC	36.0455°N 78.8639°W	20:07–20:09	1.53 mi (2.46 km)	100 yd (91 m)
EF0	Numerous trees were snapped and uprooted.						
EF0	W of Beckhamville	Chester	SC	34.572°N 80.983°W	22:35–22:36	0.45 mi (0.72 km)	25 yd (23 m)
EF0	A brief and weak tornado uprooted a few trees and snapped numerous limbs.						
EF1	NNE of Boiling Springs to S of Chesnee	Spartanburg	SC	35.072°N 81.945°W	23:09–23:20	5.25 mi (8.45 km)	200 yd (180 m)
EF1	One barn and many trees were damaged.						
EFU	NW of Morton	Cochran	TX	33.8136°N 102.8465°W	23:50–23:55	0.99 mi (1.59 km)	50 yd (46 m)
EFU	Storm chasers observed a small, short-lived tornado. No damage was reported.						
EF2	N of Morton to SW of Enochs	Cochran, Bailey	TX	33.8093°N 102.786°W	00:03–00:18	2.85 mi (4.59 km)	1,400 yd (1,300 m)
EF2	A large, dust-filled wedge tornado with multiple sub-vortices at times was documented by numerous storm chasers. The tornado remained over open farm fields and rural roads, and damage was limited to snapped power poles.						
EFU	SE of Enochs	Cochran, Bailey	TX	33.8213°N 102.7178°W	00:13–00:22	0.68 mi (1.09 km)	50 yd (46 m)
EFU	Storm chasers observed a small, short-lived tornado. No damage was reported.						
EFU	W of Pep	Cochran	TX	33.7937°N 102.6694°W	00:40–00:45	1.55 mi (2.49 km)	50 yd (46 m)
EFU	Storm chasers observed a small, short-lived tornado. No damage was reported.						
EF0	SSW of Pep	Hockley	TX	33.7802°N 102.5942°W	01:06–01:11	1.92 mi (3.09 km)	200 yd (180 m)
EF0	Wooden power poles were downed.						
EFU	SE of Morton	Cochran	TX	33.6874°N 102.6876°W	01:14–01:16	0.14 mi (0.23 km)	50 yd (46 m)
EFU	A storm chaser reported a power flash by this tornado.						
EFU	NE of Whiteface (1st tornado)	Hockley	TX	33.6627°N 102.5785°W	01:28–01:32	1.08 mi (1.74 km)	50 yd (46 m)
EFU	Storm chasers observed a brief, small tornado.						
EFU	NE of Whiteface (2nd tornado)	Hockley	TX	33.664°N 102.5559°W	01:37–01:39	0.44 mi (0.71 km)	50 yd (46 m)
EFU	Storm chasers observed a brief, small tornado.						
EF2	NW of Levelland	Hockley	TX	33.6266°N 102.5438°W	01:40–01:58	7.55 mi (12.15 km)	1,420 yd (1,300 m)
EF2	Wooden power poles were snapped at their bases, and two oil pump jacks were overturned. Only part of the track could be surveyed because roads were closed due to flooding.						

=== May 24 event ===
List of confirmed tornadoes – Tuesday, May 24, 2022
EF#	Location	County / Parish	State	Start Coord.	Time (UTC)	Path length	Max width
EF1	NE of Detroit	Red River	TX	33.6786°N 95.2362°W	20:52–21:01	7.37 mi (11.86 km)	100 yd (91 m)
EF1	A few metal panels were ripped off the roof of a manufactured home. Many trees were snapped or uprooted.						
EF2	W of Garden City	Glasscock	TX	31.888°N 101.688°W	23:00–23:16	11.15 mi (17.94 km)	200 yd (180 m)
EF2	A rain-wrapped multi-vortex tornado snapped and blew over many power poles.						

=== May 25 event ===
List of confirmed tornadoes – Wednesday, May 25, 2022
EF#	Location	County / Parish	State	Start Coord.	Time (UTC)	Path length	Max width
EF1	W of Ferry Pass	Escambia	FL	30.5114°N 87.2238°W	10:11–10:12	0.43 mi (0.69 km)	50 yd (46 m)
EF1	A brief tornado embedded in damaging straight-line winds flipped a trailer, damaged the roof of a shed, and damaged trees and power lines.						
EF1	Port Neches	Jefferson	TX	29.9762°N 93.9766°W	10:21–10:35	1.04 mi (1.67 km)	50 yd (46 m)
EF1	The roof of a house was destroyed, and a few other homes and businesses in town sustained more minor roof damage.						
EF0	S of Batchelor	Pointe Coupee	LA	30.82°N 91.66°W	13:36–13:38	1.36 mi (2.19 km)	
EF0	A brief tornado embedded within a line of thunderstorms touched down near LA 1. It caused tree damage in the area, confirmed through video, prior reports, and high-resolution satellite imagery. This tornado was confirmed in June 2025.						
EF0	SW of Geraldine	DeKalb	AL	34.3197°N 86.039°W	15:28–15:29	0.26 mi (0.42 km)	65 yd (59 m)
EF0	A brief tornado embedded within a QLCS caused minor roof damage to a garage, removed most of the roof from a chicken house, and uprooted a few trees.						
EF0	W of Carthage	Leake	MS	32.7277°N 89.5625°W	17:53–17:57	2.51 mi (4.04 km)	150 yd (140 m)
EF0	A weak tornado caused minor exterior damage to a home.						
EF0	N of Pearl River	Neshoba	MS	32.8835°N 89.2879°W	18:16–18:20	2.34 mi (3.77 km)	100 yd (91 m)
EF0	A few trees were snapped or uprooted.						
EF1	SE of Freeport	Stephenson	IL	42.23°N 89.584°W	20:06–20:09	1.83 mi (2.95 km)	30 yd (27 m)
EF1	A brief tornado hit a farmstead, destroying a grain bin, severely damaging an outbuilding, and snapping trees.						
EF0	W of Beloit	Rock	WI	42.5392°N 89.1377°W	23:45–23:55	3.48 mi (5.60 km)	50 yd (46 m)
EF0	Tree branches and sheds were lofted. The tornado was caught on video.						

=== May 26 event ===
List of confirmed tornadoes – Thursday, May 26, 2022
EF#	Location	County / Parish	State	Start Coord.	Time (UTC)	Path length	Max width
EF0	SW of Ritter	Colleton	SC	32.7702°N 80.674°W	11:15–11:17	0.69 mi (1.11 km)	75 yd (69 m)
EF0	A small, short-lived tornado destroyed a child's playhouse and uprooted several pine trees.						
EF1	S of Somerville	Morgan	AL	34.3948°N 86.7938°W	18:25–18:29	0.70 mi (1.13 km)	65 yd (59 m)
EF1	A mobile home sustained minor roof damage and trees were uprooted and snapped, with one tree falling on a shed. The tornado moved into near-inaccessible terrain and the track may have been longer.						
EFU	S of Baileyville	Ogle	IL	42.1709°N 89.6011°W	19:20–19:21	0.10 mi (0.16 km)	20 yd (18 m)
EFU	Storm spotters reported rotating dust under a funnel, lasting about 30 seconds. There was no damage.						
EF0	ESE of Lattimore	Cleveland	NC	35.308°N 81.645°W	20:13–20:14	0.24 mi (0.39 km)	25 yd (23 m)
EF0	A shed was damaged along with a few trees.						
EF0	S of Polkville	Cleveland	NC	35.377°N 81.636°W	20:23	0.01 mi (0.016 km)	25 yd (23 m)
EF0	Public shared video of a funnel cloud with some debris lofted in the air.						
EF2	SE of Love Valley to W of Union Grove	Iredell	NC	35.951°N 80.946°W	22:59–23:06	5.97 mi (9.61 km)	150 yd (140 m)
EF2	Numerous trees were snapped or uprooted by this low-end EF2 tornado. A mobile home, a building, and a barn sustained roof damage as well.						
EF1	W of Buck Shoals	Yadkin	NC	36.07°N 80.87°W	23:13–23:17	1.5 mi (2.4 km)	100 yd (91 m)
EF1	Numerous trees were snapped or uprooted, and a shed was destroyed.						
EFU	N of Waynetown	Montgomery	IN	40.1045°N 87.0659°W	23:33–23:34	0.15 mi (0.24 km)	10 yd (9.1 m)
EFU	A tornado was reported by law enforcement. No damage was reported.						
EF1	WSW of Greenup	Greenup	KY	38.5329°N 82.9948°W	23:50–23:52	0.82 mi (1.32 km)	60 yd (55 m)
EF1	A house lost a large section of its roof and had its adjacent garage destroyed.						
EF1	WNW of Siloam	Surry	NC	36.30°N 80.59°W	01:03–01:09	2.8 mi (4.5 km)	100 yd (91 m)
EF1	Numerous trees were snapped or uprooted.						

=== May 27 event ===
List of confirmed tornadoes – Friday, May 27, 2022
EF#	Location	County / Parish	State	Start Coord.	Time (UTC)	Path length	Max width
EF2	SE of Norwood to SW of Coleman Falls	Bedford	VA	37.3776°N 79.3655°W	11:24–11:36	6.3 mi (10.1 km)	330 yd (300 m)
EF2	This tornado touched down southeast of Norwood before crossing US 221, destroying two mobile homes and a well-built outbuilding. A site-built home was destroyed at high-end EF2 intensity, and was left with only interior walls standing, while a few other homes sustained roof and siding damage. A large storage garage was heavily damaged, and a Ford Mustang was partially blown out of the building. Several other outbuildings were damaged or destroyed, and numerous trees were snapped or uprooted along the path, including a few that were stripped of limbs and sustained minor debarking. Two people were injured.						
EF1	SSW of Chandlers Fork	Charlotte	VA	36.9987°N 78.7104°W	13:00–13:01	0.06 mi (0.097 km)	60 yd (55 m)
EF1	A brief tornado snapped and uprooted numerous trees, some of which fell on a house, causing significant damage. Power lines were downed as well.						
EF0	S of New Franklin	Franklin	PA	39.8524°N 77.6368°W	15:45–15:46	0.27 mi (0.43 km)	185 yd (169 m)
EF0	Multiple homes had roof and awning damage, and outbuilding had portions of their roofs removed. An object was thrown from a destroyed pole barn and stuck into the ground, and a vehicle was pushed a few feet from its original position. Trees were damaged along the path as well.						
EF0	Olney	Montgomery	MD	39.1589°N 77.0719°W	16:22–16:23	0.21 mi (0.34 km)	125 yd (114 m)
EF0	Over a dozen trees were snapped or uprooted in town, causing damage to homes and vehicles.						
EF0	N of Carlisle	Cumberland	PA	40.2675°N 77.2428°W	16:42–16:43	0.15 mi (0.24 km)	125 yd (114 m)
EF0	A trailer was tipped over, and several tree limbs were snapped.						
EF1	Kirkwood to SW Christiana	Lancaster	PA	39.8552°N 76.0797°W	18:11–18:16	3.05 mi (4.91 km)	130 yd (120 m)
EF1	The tornado touched down in Kirkwood and moved northeast, damaging or destroying multiple barns and several sheds. Many trees were snapped or uprooted, and the top of a silo was blown off. A house sustained damage to its windows and siding, along with partial collapse of a basement wall, injuring three people inside.						
EF0	N of Conway	Horry	SC	33.9089°N 79.0653°W	20:57–21:02	0.99 mi (1.59 km)	15 yd (14 m)
EF0	Two manufactured homes in a home park sustained minor damage, with blown out underpinning, ripped off trim, and removed portions of siding. Trees were snapped as well.						
EF0	Loris	Horry	SC	34.0513°N 78.8869°W	21:32–21:33	0.99 mi (1.59 km)	20 yd (18 m)
EF0	A weak, short-lived tornado mainly damaged trees as it moved through the town of Loris.						
EF0	N of Dabneys to SSE of Beaverdam	Louisa, Hanover	VA	37.8095°N 77.7960°W	22:22–22:47	11.13 mi (17.91 km)	50 yd (46 m)
EF0	Multiple trees were snapped, some of which fell on and caused significant damage to a house. A chicken coop was destroyed as well.						
EF0	SSE of Marsing	Owyhee, Canyon	ID	43.4121°N 116.7564°W	23:00–23:15	3.77 mi (6.07 km)	35 yd (32 m)
EF0	Fragile bush was laid flat in one direction.						
EF1	N of Yanceyville	Louisa	VA	37.9636°N 77.9989°W	23:51–23:55	2.58 mi (4.15 km)	450 yd (410 m)
EF1	Numerous trees were snapped or uprooted. Several homes had their shingles and siding ripped off, in addition to awning, gutter, and window damage. Additional damage was inflicted by falling trees.						
EF1	Charlotte Hall to NW of Benedict	St. Mary's, Charles	MD	38.4957°N 76.7820°W	00:32–00:41	4.14 mi (6.66 km)	100 yd (91 m)
EF1	Many trees were snapped or uprooted and tree limbs were downed. Two homes were damaged by falling trees as well.						
EF0	SSE of Grant	Perkins	NE	40.70°N 101.65°W	00:56	0.01 mi (0.016 km)	10 yd (9.1 m)
EF0	A landspout tornado briefly occurred in an open field with no reported damage.						

=== May 30 event ===
List of confirmed tornadoes – Monday, May 30, 2022
EF#	Location	County / Parish	State	Start Coord.	Time (UTC)	Path length	Max width
EF1	ENE of Fordyce	Cedar	NE	42.72°N 97.28°W	06:20–06:23	3.02 mi (4.86 km)	100 yd (91 m)
EF1	This tornado damaged multiple center pivot irrigation systems, grain bins, and snapped several power poles.						
EF1	Southern Sioux Falls	Minnehaha	SD	43.5161°N 96.751°W	06:51–06:53	0.51 mi (0.82 km)	50 yd (46 m)
EF1	A brief tornado embedded within a larger area of straight-line winds uprooted multiple trees, snapped branches, and damaged two garages in the southern part of Sioux Falls. One tree fell on and crushed an unoccupied car, and some homes sustained shingle damage.						
EF1	E of Brandon	Minnehaha	SD	43.5868°N 96.5389°W	07:05–07:06	0.54 mi (0.87 km)	50 yd (46 m)
EF1	A church suffered damage to large sections of its roof, and multiple trees were damaged or snapped.						
EF1	ENE of Lester	Lyon	IA	43.4479°N 96.2736°W	07:17–07:19	1.94 mi (3.12 km)	100 yd (91 m)
EF1	A tornado embedded within a larger area of damaging straight-line winds damaged multiple outbuildings at a dairy farm. A large section of a hog barn's roof was lifted as well.						
EF0	Doon	Lyon	IA	43.2737°N 96.233°W	07:21–07:22	0.54 mi (0.87 km)	60 yd (55 m)
EF0	A brief tornado damaged trees and a garage.						
EF0	SW of Adrian	Nobles	MN	43.5719°N 95.9786°W	07:33–07:34	0.9 mi (1.4 km)	50 yd (46 m)
EF0	Trees and outbuildings were damaged at two farmsteads.						
EFU	ENE of Niobrara to S of Springfield	Bon Homme	SD	42.7732°N 97.9556°W	17:29–17:31	5.46 mi (8.79 km)	50 yd (46 m)
EFU	A tornado spun up in the Missouri River and moved through the river bottoms. No damage could be found.						
EFU	NNW of Montrose	McCook	SD	43.781°N 97.2186°W	18:55–18:56	0.83 mi (1.34 km)	25 yd (23 m)
EFU	A tornado briefly spun up in an open field causing no damage.						
EFU	W of Sinai	Brookings	SD	44.255°N 97.1014°W	19:15–19:17	1.67 mi (2.69 km)	50 yd (46 m)
EFU	A tornado spun up over Lake Sinai and dissipated before reaching shore.						
EF1	SSW of Volga	Brookings	SD	44.2771°N 96.9578°W	19:23–19:24	0.8 mi (1.3 km)	50 yd (46 m)
EF1	A tornado formed over an open field and caused considerable damage to a barn.						
EF0	W of Dempster	Hamlin	SD	44.6316°N 96.9869°W	19:30–19:31	0.65 mi (1.05 km)	10 yd (9.1 m)
EF0	A brief tornado was spotted by an eyewitness as it caused minor damage to a cattle shed.						
EF2	W of Clear Lake	Deuel	SD	44.6822°N 96.8239°W	19:41–19:53	12.43 mi (20.00 km)	150 yd (140 m)
EF2	On a farmstead, one stave silo was destroyed while another was severely damaged. Elsewhere, a house had roofing torn off, power poles were snapped, and multiple outbuildings and farm structures were damaged or destroyed. A grain bin was thrown 0.25 miles (0.40 km), large trees were snapped and twisted, and farming equipment was tossed.						
EF3	S of Goodwin to N of Altamont	Deuel	SD	44.7958°N 96.8255°W	19:46–19:58	13.31 mi (21.42 km)	100 yd (91 m)
EF3	A grain bin was ripped from its base and thrown 1 mi (1.6 km). Three metal truss transmission towers were downed, one of which was completely twisted and mangled. Several outbuildings were destroyed, and a house had its roof torn off at a farmstead.						
EF1	WNW of Clear Lake	Deuel	SD	44.7731°N 96.7557°W	19:50–19:51	0.42 mi (0.68 km)	100 yd (91 m)
EF1	Farming equipment was flipped, and trees were snapped by this brief tornado.						
EF1	SSW of La Bolt to NNW of Albee	Grant	SD	44.9994°N 96.7118°W	20:05–20:10	10.67 mi (17.17 km)	40 yd (37 m)
EF1	The roofs were ripped off two barns and tossed 0.25 miles (0.40 km). A stave silo was destroyed, a grain bin was dented, roof panels were ripped off a house, windows were broken, and trees were snapped or uprooted. Outbuildings were damaged and power poles were snapped as well, and tree damage occurred in La Bolt.						
EF1	N of Albee	Grant	SD	45.1068°N 96.5618°W	20:10–20:14	4.45 mi (7.16 km)	20 yd (18 m)
EF1	Trees were twisted, snapped or uprooted, or otherwise damaged. A house lost 1/4 of its roof panels and a dairy barn was damaged as well.						
EFU	SSW of Jasper	Rock	MN	43.799°N 96.4448°W	20:15–20:16	0.74 mi (1.19 km)	20 yd (18 m)
EFU	A brief tornado spun up in open fields and lowlands.						
EFU	NNW of Trosky	Pipestone	MN	43.9254°N 96.3048°W	20:25–20:26	0.38 mi (0.61 km)	20 yd (18 m)
EFU	A brief tornado spun up over open farmland.						
EF1	N of Correll	Big Stone	MN	45.2984°N 96.1441°W	20:36–20:38	2.4 mi (3.9 km)	30 yd (27 m)
EF1	A brief tornado touchdown was documented by a storm chaser. Two farmsteads were damaged and outbuildings were destroyed.						
EF1	N of Milan	Chippewa, Swift	MN	45.1454°N 95.9201°W	20:39–20:41	1.77 mi (2.85 km)	100 yd (91 m)
EF1	A tornado uprooted numerous trees and significantly damaged farm outbuildings.						
EF1	SW of Danvers to SE of Hancock	Swift, Stevens, Pope	MN	45.2212°N 95.8281°W	20:40–21:01	18.34 mi (29.52 km)	350 yd (320 m)
EF1	Several wooden poles with electrical transmission lines were snapped, irrigation systems were overturned and some structural damage to homes and farm outbuildings occurred.						
EF1	N of Holloway	Swift	MN	45.2994°N 95.9205°W	20:49–20:56	7.17 mi (11.54 km)	100 yd (91 m)
EF1	A tornado hit several farms, knocking down trees, tearing tin off of several sheds and causing major damage to barns.						
EF1	W of Hancock to SW of Starbuck	Pope	MN	45.5151°N 95.6965°W	21:04–21:09	5.39 mi (8.67 km)	100 yd (91 m)
EF1	Some trees were snapped and farm buildings were damaged.						
EF1	WNW of Starbuck	Pope	MN	45.6047°N 95.6081°W	21:13–21:16	3.16 mi (5.09 km)	200 yd (180 m)
EF1	A small outbuilding was completely destroyed. A truck and trailer were overturned.						
EF2	SE of Elbow Lake	Grant	MN	45.88°N 96.00°W	21:14–21:19	6.84 mi (11.01 km)	350 yd (320 m)
EF2	A low-end EF2 tornado wrapped in downburst winds and heavy rain snapped several wooden power poles, including a nearly 2 miles (3.2 km) long stretch of "double-H" pole structures. Several steel grain bins were caved in, ripped off their foundations, and crumpled. Multiple small wooden and metal storage sheds had portions of their roofs and walls torn away, and many large trees were snapped or uprooted.						
EF2	SSW of Wendell to NNE of Elbow Lake	Grant	MN	45.96°N 96.12°W	21:15–21:24	11.01 mi (17.72 km)	400 yd (370 m)
EF2	Several wooden power poles were snapped, and numerous trees were snapped or uprooted. Six out of eight steel grain bins at a farmstead were removed from their foundations and rolled or crushed. Multiple small wooden or metal storage sheds were heavily damaged.						
EF2	N of Glenwood to E of Carlos	Pope, Douglas	MN	45.7261°N 95.3956°W	21:27–21:47	19.63 mi (31.59 km)	800 yd (730 m)
EF2	A large and strong multi-vortex tornado began on the southeastern side of Lake Reno and moved north-northeastward, causing severe damage in the southern part of Forada, where a number homes in a neighborhood were struck. Several homes had their roofs torn off, had exterior walls knocked down, and had their garages blown out or collapsed. Several sheds, barns, and detached garages were destroyed and numerous cars were tossed or otherwise damaged, including one that was impaled by a large piece of wood. The tornado weakened as it struck Nelson, where trees were downed, a garage slid off its foundation, sheds were damaged or destroyed, and homes sustained minor damage. Elsewhere along the path, outbuildings were damaged or destroyed, trees were snapped and uprooted, power poles were snapped, and a few additional homes suffered minor to moderate damage.						
EF1	W of Urbank	Otter Tail	MN	46.1245°N 95.5393°W	21:34–21:38	4.48 mi (7.21 km)	200 yd (180 m)
EF1	Numerous trees were snapped or uprooted. One house lost numerous shingles, and a farm building lost metal panels.						
EF1	E of Perham	Otter Tail	MN	46.5795°N 95.5402°W	21:58–22:04	5.39 mi (8.67 km)	300 yd (270 m)
EF1	Numerous trees were snapped, and a garage had its doors blown in and its back wall blown out.						
EF1	SSW of Eagle Bend to SW of Staples	Todd	MN	46.1318°N 95.0461°W	22:00–22:17	15.04 mi (24.20 km)	800 yd (730 m)
EF1	A large tornado moved through the eastern side of Eagle Bend, where many trees were knocked down or snapped, several homes lost portions of their roofs, multiple sheds and buildings had parts of their tin roofs peeled off, and three very large and filled grain bins had their tops blown off. The tornado then exited town and moved northeastward over open country, inflicting scattered tree damage before dissipating.						
EF2	E of Aldrich to SSE of Olyen	Todd, Wadena	MN	46.3614°N 94.8706°W	22:20–22:30	9.99 mi (16.08 km)	450 yd (410 m)
EF2	A park shelter was destroyed at a camp site, and a cabin had its roof torn off and sustained collapse of an exterior wall. Numerous wooden power poles were snapped, at least three center pivot irrigation systems were flipped and rolled, and outbuildings had roofing material ripped off at multiple farmsteads. Numerous trees were snapped or uprooted along the path.						
EF1	N of Staples	Wadena	MN	46.3965°N 94.8277°W	22:27–22:30	2.49 mi (4.01 km)	150 yd (140 m)
EF1	A tornado wrapped in downburst winds and rain snapped several trees.						
EF1	Poplar	Cass	MN	46.56°N 94.72°W	22:37–22:45	4.3 mi (6.9 km)	500 yd (460 m)
EF1	A large tornado snapped trees, tree limbs, and power poles in and around Poplar. Several trees were also uprooted and small pieces of farming equipment were tossed 100 yards (91 m).						
EF1	SE of Glencoe to NE of Winsted	McLeod, Carver, Wright	MN	44.7379°N 94.0892°W	23:12–23:28	18.49 mi (29.76 km)	400 yd (370 m)
EF1	Several farm outbuildings were collapsed, roofs were partially ripped off several sheds and outbuildings, a camper was rolled, and multiple power poles were downed. Many trees were snapped or uprooted as well.						
EF0	SW of Cohasset	Itasca	MN	47.229°N 93.6597°W	23:44–23:46	1 mi (1.6 km)	40 yd (37 m)
EF0	A home lost part of its roof deck, which was lifted and tossed into the yard, and also sustained shingle damage. Trees were also damaged along the path with some being snapped or uprooted.						
EF1	Deer River	Itasca	MN	47.33°N 93.79°W	23:46–23:50	2.5 mi (4.0 km)	150 yd (140 m)
EF1	A tornado touched down in Deer River, where a furniture store had its windows blown out, parts of its facade collapsed, and had uplift of its roof. An RV was also tossed, landing in the parking lot of furniture store. Nearby, an unanchored small metal shed in middle of a parking lot was completely destroyed, and a multi-purpose building had its roof uplifted. The tornado caused minor damage to the siding and roof of a church, which had debris impaled into its exterior, while a nearby metal flag pole was bent. Two two-car garages and sheds were damaged or shifted off their foundations and collapsed. Many trees in town were snapped, and a dugout, a small outbuilding, and chain link fencing was destroyed at a baseball field.						
EF1	Eastern Hinckley	Pine	MN	46.0119°N 92.9299°W	00:50–00:54	3.3 mi (5.3 km)	300 yd (270 m)
EF1	Several homes other structures were damaged in Hinckley, including some buildings that lost portions of their roofs. A fast food restaurant sustained broken windows, exterior damage, and damage to a rooftop HVAC unit. Numerous trees were also damaged and a metal billboard along Interstate 35 collapsed.						

=== May 31 event ===
List of confirmed tornadoes – Monday, May 31, 2022
EF#	Location	County / Parish	State	Start Coord.	Time (UTC)	Path length	Max width
EFU	SE of New Port Richey to W of Trinity	Pasco	FL	28.2098°N 82.6904°W	21:50–21:51	0.25 mi (0.40 km)	25 yd (23 m)
EFU	A tornado touched down southeast of New Port Richey causing damage to multiple homes. A tree was snapped further along its path before it struck a strip mall partially tearing the roof covering off, an awning at a restaurant was destroyed near the location. It moved further south until it dissipated west of Trinity.						
EFU	SE of Town 'n' Country	Hillsborough	FL	27.9847°N 82.5584°W	21:55–21:56	0.5 mi (0.80 km)	25 yd (23 m)
EFU	A tornado touched down southeast of Town 'n' Country causing damage to a few structures.						
EFU	ENE of Desoto Lakes	Manatee	FL	27.39°N 82.47°W	22:10–22:11	0.5 mi (0.80 km)	25 yd (23 m)
EFU	Broadcast media shared multiple videos received of a brief tornado occurring. No damage was reported.						
EF0	WNW of Dodson	Collingsworth	TX	34.7927°N 100.0807°W	22:42–22:48	1.75 mi (2.82 km)	125 yd (114 m)
EF0	Most of the damage was limited to trees. The walls of a barn near the end of the path collapsed.						
EF0	Dodson, TX	Collingsworth (TX), Harmon (OK)	TX, OK	34.7624°N 100.0317°W	22:54–23:02	2.36 mi (3.80 km)	180 yd (160 m)
EF0	A multiple-vortex tornado damaged the roofs and porches of several homes, destroyed weak outbuildings, and broke power poles. A travel trailer was rolled 40 feet (12 m) and destroyed, and tree limbs were snapped.						
EF0	SW of Hollis	Harmon	OK	34.6766°N 99.9267°W	23:32–23:33	0.5 mi (0.80 km)	20 yd (18 m)
EF0	A storm chaser and a police chief observed a tornado.						
EFU	W of Dexter	Cowley	KS	37.17°N 96.82°W	23:48–23:49	0.02 mi (0.032 km)	20 yd (18 m)
EFU	A storm tracker for KSNW saw a brief tornado that lasted for a few seconds.						
EFU	E of McKnight	Harmon	OK	34.7719°N 99.8204°W	23:55	0.3 mi (0.48 km)	20 yd (18 m)
EFU	A brief tornado was observed but caused no damage.						
EFU	SW of Dexter	Cowley	KS	37.11°N 96.78°W	01:30–01:31	0.03 mi (0.048 km)	20 yd (18 m)
EFU	A brief tornado touched down in an open field.						
EFU	SW of Dexter	Cowley	KS	37.16°N 96.74°W	01:40–01:41	0.01 mi (0.016 km)	20 yd (18 m)
EFU	A video on social media showed a brief tornado occur in an open field.						
EF1	NE of Tipton	Tillman	OK	34.531°N 99.11°W	03:31–03:33	1 mi (1.6 km)	200 yd (180 m)
EF1	A tornado damaged power poles.						
EF1	NW of Industry	McDonough	IL	40.3714°N 90.6477°W	03:34–03:38	1.6 mi (2.6 km)	60 yd (55 m)
EF1	A grain bin was lofted, an outbuilding was damaged, and a power pole was snapped.						
EF1	S of Hollister	Tillman	OK	34.296°N 98.918°W	04:17–04:23	4.7 mi (7.6 km)	100 yd (91 m)
EF1	Power poles were snapped.						

== June ==
Confirmed tornadoes by Enhanced Fujita rating
EFU	EF0	EF1	EF2	EF3	EF4	EF5	Total
32	39	40	12	0	0	0	123

=== June 3 event ===
List of confirmed tornadoes – Friday, June 3, 2022
EF#	Location	County / Parish	State	Start Coord.	Time (UTC)	Path length	Max width
EFU	WSW of Las Animas	Otero, Bent	CO	38.01°N 103.40°W	23:00–23:15	5.26 mi (8.47 km)	20 yd (18 m)
EFU	Numerous photos on social media showed a dusty landspout on the ground for approximately 15 minutes.						
EF0	N of Fort Lyon	Bent	CO	38.15°N 103.16°W	23:23–23:28	4.18 mi (6.73 km)	5 yd (4.6 m)
EF0	Tornado downed power lines and lifted a truck, blowing out the truck's windows and ripping off the mirrors.						
EFU	Hasty to SSW of McClave	Bent	CO	38.11°N 102.96°W	23:43–23:48	5.52 mi (8.88 km)	20 yd (18 m)
EFU	Photo evidence of a tornado lasting approximately 5 minutes from multiple individuals.						
EFU	SSE of Schramm to WNW of Vernon	Yuma	CO	39.9704°N 102.5017°W	00:58–01:06	3.64 mi (5.86 km)	50 yd (46 m)
EFU	Report of a tornado spotted which lasted around 8 minutes.						
EFU	SSW of Wray	Yuma	CO	39.9916°N 102.3526°W	01:11–01:15	2.34 mi (3.77 km)	50 yd (46 m)
EFU	Storm chaser reported a tornado over open country.						
EFU	W of Bonny Lake	Yuma	CO	39.6219°N 102.2559°W	01:40–01:41	0.65 mi (1.05 km)	50 yd (46 m)
EFU	Landspout tornado was observed over open country.						

=== June 4 event ===
List of confirmed tornadoes – Saturday, June 4, 2022
EF#	Location	County / Parish	State	Start Coord.	Time (UTC)	Path length	Max width
EFU	NNE of Firstview to NNW of Cheyenne Wells	Cheyenne	CO	38.9642°N 102.4477°W	23:08–23:12	0.71 mi (1.14 km)	50 yd (46 m)
EFU	Public reported of a landspout tornado.						
EFU	SSE of Oberlin to WSW of Kanona	Decatur	KS	39.8011°N 100.505°W	02:01–02:04	3.32 mi (5.34 km)	75 yd (69 m)
EFU	Storm chaser reported a tornado over open country.						

=== June 5 event ===
List of confirmed tornadoes – Sunday, June 5, 2022
EF#	Location	County / Parish	State	Start Coord.	Time (UTC)	Path length	Max width
EF0	W of Hay Springs	Sheridan	NE	42.68°N 102.69°W	22:03	0.05 mi (0.080 km)	10 yd (9.1 m)
EF0	Brief touchdown in open field for less than a minute, then lifted. No damage was reported.						

=== June 6 event ===
List of confirmed tornadoes – Monday, June 6, 2022
EF#	Location	County / Parish	State	Start Coord.	Time (UTC)	Path length	Max width
EFU	W of Petersburg	Boone	NE	41.85°N 98.10°W	19:29	0.05 mi (0.080 km)	20 yd (18 m)
EFU	Trained spotter reported a tornado damaging a center pivot irrigation system.						
EF0	NNE of Irwin	Cherry	NE	42.92°N 101.92°W	19:47	0.05 mi (0.080 km)	10 yd (9.1 m)
EF0	Fire department reported a brief touchdown.						
EF0	SW of Lakewood Park to W of Fort Pierce	St. Lucie	FL	27.5°N 80.5°W	22:06–22:18	3.32 mi (5.34 km)	75 yd (69 m)
EF0	The roof of a barn was damaged, power lines were downed, and a trailer was tipped over.						
EF0	NNW of Brownsville	Haywood	TN	35.6828°N 89.2948°W	23:43–23:46	0.07 mi (0.11 km)	40 yd (37 m)
EF0	A brief tornado struck the Christmasville community, causing roof damage to the Hickory Grove Missionary Baptist Church and downing a large tree and several tree limbs. A cemetery next to the church had several small headstones knocked down.						

=== June 7 event ===
List of confirmed tornadoes – Tuesday, June 7, 2022
EF#	Location	County / Parish	State	Start Coord.	Time (UTC)	Path length	Max width
EF1	NW of Van Tassel	Niobrara	WY	42.6999°N 104.2002°W	20:21–20:27	3.5 mi (5.6 km)	225 yd (206 m)
EF1	A barn lost its roof and part of its second story, and a shed and farm building lost tin roofing. Wood and sheet metal fences were blown down, and trees were uprooted and snapped. A road sensor recorded a 78 mph (126 km/h) gust.						
EFU	N of Sedgwick	Sedgwick	CO	40.95°N 102.52°W	23:03–23:04	0.01 mi (0.016 km)	50 yd (46 m)
EFU	A tornado touched down in an open field; no damage was observed.						
EFU	NE of Sedgwick	Sedgwick	CO	40.96°N 102.48°W	23:09–23:10	0.01 mi (0.016 km)	50 yd (46 m)
EFU	A tornado touched down in an open field; no damage was observed.						
EF0	SE of Wagon Mound	Mora	NM	35.83°N 104.47°W	23:30–23:35	0.19 mi (0.31 km)	10 yd (9.1 m)
EF0	A storm chaser reported a brief, weak landspout tornado over open rangeland.						
EFU	WNW of Amherst	Phillips	CO	40.74°N 102.34°W	23:44–23:45	0.01 mi (0.016 km)	50 yd (46 m)
EFU	A landspout tornado occurred in an open field with no observable damage.						
EFU	SSE of Holyoke	Phillips	CO	40.53°N 102.24°W	00:09–00:10	0.01 mi (0.016 km)	50 yd (46 m)
EFU	Landspout tornado touched down briefly in an open field.						
EFU	NNW of Las Animas	Bent	CO	38.20°N 103.33°W	00:36–00:45	3.40 mi (5.47 km)	25 yd (23 m)
EFU	Storm chaser showed pictures of a tornado via social media.						
EFU	S of Lamar	Prowers	CO	37.97°N 102.62°W	00:56–01:05	6.39 mi (10.28 km)	20 yd (18 m)
EFU	An off-duty NWS employee reported a tornado touchdown.						
EFU	E of Two Buttes to NE of Walsh	Baca	CO	37.61°N 102.13°W	02:18–02:25	6.35 mi (10.22 km)	20 yd (18 m)
EFU	Law enforcement confirmed a tornado touchdown.						
EF0	NW of Ruskin to N of Byron	Nuckolls, Thayer	NE	40.1546°N 97.8859°W	02:42–02:51	9.42 mi (15.16 km)	25 yd (23 m)
EF0	A shed and two farm grain bins were destroyed. At least two other buildings lost tin or shingles from their roofs, and trees were damaged along the path.						
EF1	Narka	Republic	KS	39.9613°N 97.4249°W	03:15–03:25	3.06 mi (4.92 km)	75 yd (69 m)
EF1	This tornado touched down in Narka, where a grain bin was damaged and tree limbs were broken. Additional tree damage occurred outside of town before the tornado dissipated.						
EFU	ENE of Two Buttes to NNE of Walsh	Baca	CO	37.61°N 102.26°W	03:27–03:35	8.07 mi (12.99 km)	20 yd (18 m)
EFU	Trained spotters reported a tornado touched down.						
EF1	SW of Marysville	Marshall	KS	39.7999°N 96.713°W	04:02–04:05	2.79 mi (4.49 km)	75 yd (69 m)
EF1	An old barn was destroyed and trees and tree limbs were snapped.						

=== June 8 event ===
List of confirmed tornadoes – Wednesday, June 8, 2022
EF#	Location	County / Parish	State	Start Coord.	Time (UTC)	Path length	Max width
EF1	Lenexa, KS to N of Grandview, MO	Johnson (KS), Jackson (MO)	KS, MO	38.964°N 94.7853°W	06:10–06:30	14.36 mi (23.11 km)	125 yd (114 m)
EF1	A tornado moved through the Kansas City metropolitan area, where multiple businesses sustained shingle damage, broken windows, and had HVAC units ripped off. An apartment building and a multi-story building sustained roof damage, and light poles and traffic lights were downed. Power poles were snapped and left leaning, fencing was damaged, and trees were uprooted and snapped along the path.						
EF0	N of Paola to S of Louisburg	Miami	KS	38.6424°N 94.8316°W	06:21–06:35	9.74 mi (15.68 km)	75 yd (69 m)
EF0	Two sheds were rolled, and awning was torn from a home, and picnic tables were overturned. Tree limbs were broken, trees were uprooted, and hedges were damaged.						
EF0	W of Somerset to SE of Louisburg	Miami	KS	38.6076°N 94.7944°W	06:24–06:37	9.55 mi (15.37 km)	75 yd (69 m)
EF0	Tree limbs, small trees, and power poles were snapped near the start of the track. The tornado was on the ground simultaneously with the previous tornado.						
EF2	NE of Independence to ESE of Buckner	Jackson	MO	39.121°N 94.3091°W	06:37–06:46	9.56 mi (15.39 km)	200 yd (180 m)
EF2	A house sustained roof damage, and another house lost a large portion of its roof. A metal building was significantly damaged, and trees were snapped and uprooted.						
EF1	W of Arlington to N of Rushville	Rush	IN	39.6405°N 85.6188°W	20:08–20:28	9.69 mi (15.59 km)	100 yd (91 m)
EF1	Two homes lost parts of their roofs and another sustained shingle damage. Barns were damaged, and one was picked up and moved 40 feet (12 m) intact. A school and a large garage also sustained roof damage, and trees and tree limbs were snapped.						
EF1	ENE of Gordon to SSW of Potsdam	Darke	OH	39.9384°N 84.4772°W	21:42–21:46	2.45 mi (3.94 km)	125 yd (114 m)
EF1	The tornado damaged barns and outbuildings along its path.						
EF2	W of West Milton to SW of Alcony	Miami	OH	39.9692°N 84.362°W	21:53–22:16	13.75 mi (22.13 km)	150 yd (140 m)
EF2	This tornado initially caused minor tree and structure damage in West Milton and the small community of Nashville before strengthening as it entered Tipp City, where a large Meijer distribution warehouse had a portion of its roof peeled back, and sustained total collapse of an exterior wall and part of its roof structure. Empty semi trailers were overturned or rolled, cars were flipped or damaged, and some homes in town sustained roof damage. Elsewhere along the path, there was less intense damage to homes, farm buildings, power poles, and trees.						
EF0	Summitville	Madison	IN	40.3409°N 85.646°W	22:13–22:14	0.58 mi (0.93 km)	25 yd (23 m)
EF0	A weak tornado produced intermittent damage in Summitville, where a poorly secured roof was partially lifted at a water treatment plant. Debris showed a convergent pattern, with some thrown in the opposite direction of the storm's motion. Fencing was downed and trees and roofs were damaged, with some tree limbs landing on and damaging a home and a car.						
EF1	SW of North Hampton to WNW of Vienna	Clark	OH	39.9734°N 83.9863°W	22:23–22:51	16.92 mi (27.23 km)	200 yd (180 m)
EF1	This tornado moved through the north side of Springfield, where trees were damaged and a cinder-block outbuilding had its roof torn off at a baseball field. Elsewhere along the path, hundreds of trees were snapped or uprooted, homes sustained roof damage, and minor outbuilding damage occurred.						
EF0	N of Urbana to WNW of Cable	Champaign	OH	40.1700°N 83.7498°W	22:42–22:52	5.69 mi (9.16 km)	150 yd (140 m)
EF0	A barn was destroyed, another barn had a door track ripped off, and another lose metal roofing. A shed was rolled on its side, a garage door was damaged, a house and detached garage lost siding, and the porch was ripped from another house. Trees were uprooted and snapped.						
EF0	Sardinia	Brown	OH	39.0044°N 83.8102°W	23:07–23:10	2.1 mi (3.4 km)	80 yd (73 m)
EF0	Widespread minor tree damage was observed throughout Sardinia. A stand of softwood trees was heavily damaged, with numerous trees snapped off.						
EF2	SE of Adelphi to Stella	Hocking, Vinton	OH	39.3748°N 82.7371°W	23:16–23:30	9.1 mi (14.6 km)	700 yd (640 m)
EF2	A strong tornado moved through remote forested areas in the Hocking Hills region, flattening a large swath of trees. Near South Bloomingville, large hillsides were almost completely deforested, with nearly every tree in the path snapped or uprooted.						
EF1	Lake Hope State Park	Vinton	OH	39.3316°N 82.3533°W	23:45–23:46	0.42 mi (0.68 km)	200 yd (180 m)
EF1	A tornado snapped and uprooted large trees.						
EF0	SE of Lake Hope State Park	Vinton	OH	39.3263°N 82.3178°W	23:52–23:54	0.63 mi (1.01 km)	100 yd (91 m)
EF0	A tornado uprooted trees and snapped small trees.						
EF0	SE of Mechanicsville	St. Mary's	MD	38.4256°N 76.7184°W	00:42–00:47	3.01 mi (4.84 km)	75 yd (69 m)
EF0	The merger of two severe thunderstorms led to the development of this brief, spin-up tornado. Trees were snapped and uprooted, including one tree that fell onto and damaged the roof of a home.						

=== June 9 event ===
List of confirmed tornadoes – Thursday, June 9, 2022
EF#	Location	County / Parish	State	Start Coord.	Time (UTC)	Path length	Max width
EF1	NNE of Grenloch	Camden	NJ	39.7877°N 75.0265°W	08:59–09:01	0.26 mi (0.42 km)	60 yd (55 m)
EF1	A shed had roof damage and a house had siding damage, and a fence was damaged as well. Trees were uprooted and tree limbs were broken; one tree fell on a house.						
EF0	Port St. Lucie	St. Lucie	FL	27.3075°N 80.3013°W	19:40–19:45	1.5 mi (2.4 km)	200 yd (180 m)
EF0	This tornado touched down and caused damage to mobile home roofs and siding. It also knocked a large tree down and damaged metal roof covers at a bus lot.						

=== June 10 event ===
List of confirmed tornadoes – Friday, June 10, 2022
EF#	Location	County / Parish	State	Start Coord.	Time (UTC)	Path length	Max width
EFU	SSE of Hill City	Graham	KS	39.1788°N 99.7945°W	05:11–05:13	1.36 mi (2.19 km)	100 yd (91 m)
EFU	A trained spotter reported a brief tornado over open fields.						

=== June 11 event ===
List of confirmed tornadoes – Saturday, June 11, 2022
EF#	Location	County / Parish	State	Start Coord.	Time (UTC)	Path length	Max width
EF0	Rotonda West	Charlotte	FL	26.89°N 82.29°W	06:38–06:39	0.06 mi (0.097 km)	25 yd (23 m)
EF0	A weak, narrow tornado uplifted a small part of the roof off a home and destroyed a pool cage. Other homes suffered some minor shingle damage and small tree branches were downed.						
EFU	SW of Pendleton	Umatilla	OR	45.61°N 118.91°W	19:00–19:30	0.02 mi (0.032 km)	15 yd (14 m)
EFU	A pilot observed a small tornado kicking up dust.						
EFU	ENE of Blue Springs	Gage	NE	40.14°N 96.61°W	22:18	0.05 mi (0.080 km)	20 yd (18 m)
EFU	Trained spotter reported a brief touchdown of a tornado.						
EF1	ESE of Odell, NE to WNW of Oketo, KS	Gage (NE), Marshall (KS)	NE, KS	40.02°N 96.69°W	22:40–22:53	4.10 mi (6.60 km)	150 yd (140 m)
EF1	A house had part of its roof torn off and was heavily damaged by a falling tree. A barn had its roof torn off, a windmill was knocked over, trees were downed, and outbuildings were damage as well. The same high-precipitation supercell that produced this tornado also produced the four others in Marshall and Pottawatomie Counties, Kansas.						
EF1	S of Oketo to Marysville	Marshall	KS	39.9212°N 96.597°W	22:53–23:11	6.25 mi (10.06 km)	30 yd (27 m)
EF1	Trees were damaged and power lines were downed to the south of Oketo, and a storage building in downtown Marysville sustained collapse of an unreinforced masonry wall. A nearby business had its roof blown off and sustained partial collapse of its brick façade. The tornado was embedded within a much larger area of 80–100 mph (130–160 km/h) straight-line winds.						
EF1	ENE of Marysville	Marshall	KS	39.8611°N 96.5953°W	23:02–23:05	0.71 mi (1.14 km)	50 yd (46 m)
EF1	A brief cone tornado tore the roof from a barn and snapped a power pole.						
EF1	N of Blue Rapids	Marshall	KS	39.7259°N 96.64°W	23:26–23:31	1.71 mi (2.75 km)	100 yd (91 m)
EF1	Train cars were overturned and trees were damaged.						
EF1	E of Olsburg to N of Manhattan	Pottawatomie	KS	39.44°N 96.558°W	00:04–00:15	11.25 mi (18.11 km)	50 yd (46 m)
EF1	A home lost part of its roof and the doors of a shed were blown out. Tree limbs were snapped and trees were uprooted.						
EF2	Manhattan	Riley	KS	39.1971°N 96.5765°W	00:20–00:22	0.32 mi (0.51 km)	50 yd (46 m)
EF2	A brief but strong tornado embedded in a larger area of straight-line winds touched down at the east edge of the Kansas State University campus, where a couple of buildings sustained damage. A few homes in a nearby neighborhood lost significant portions of their roofs, and one home had most of its roof torn off. Multiple other homes had minor structural and window damage, and trees and tree limbs were downed as well. Due to the tornado being brief as well as embedded within a larger area of 60–80 mph (97–129 km/h) straight-line winds, deciphering tornado damage from straight-line wind damage was difficult.						
EFU	SSW of Zeandale	Riley	KS	39.0981°N 96.4743°W	00:32	0.01 mi (0.016 km)	10 yd (9.1 m)
EFU	A storm chaser took video of a brief tornado in open country.						
EF0	SE of Hemple	Clinton	MO	39.7039°N 94.5542°W	03:07–03:08	0.02 mi (0.032 km)	20 yd (18 m)
EF0	A brief tornado occurred and did some damage to a pole barn.						

=== June 12 event ===
List of confirmed tornadoes – Sunday, June 12, 2022
EF#	Location	County / Parish	State	Start Coord.	Time (UTC)	Path length	Max width
EFU	NE of Denver International Airport	Denver	CO	39.90°N 104.69°W	20:08–20:09	0.01 mi (0.016 km)	50 yd (46 m)
EFU	A landspout developed briefly in an open field but no damage was observed.						
EF1	NE of Newfolden to WSW of Middle River	Marshall	MN	48.4021°N 96.2736°W	20:48–20:53	2.66 mi (4.28 km)	300 yd (270 m)
EF1	Six power poles were snapped. Numerous trees were snapped and uprooted.						
EF0	NE of Erie	Pennington	MN	48.10°N 95.63°W	22:10–22:11	0.79 mi (1.27 km)	75 yd (69 m)
EF0	Photographs and videos show a dust whirl in an open field beneath a wall cloud, but without an apparent condensation funnel.						
EF2	SE of Kelly	Teton	WY	43.5884°N 110.5228°W	22:35–22:45	2.13 mi (3.43 km)	360 yd (330 m)
EF2	A strong tornado occurred in a remote, densely forested area of the Teton National Forest. Thousands of pine trees were snapped or uprooted, with some debarking evident. The tornado was confirmed months after the event from aerial and satellite images.						
EF2	NW of Okaton	Jones	SD	43.8954°N 100.9405°W	03:15–03:16	0.48 mi (0.77 km)	30 yd (27 m)
EF2	A brief but strong tornado touched down and ripped five large, well-anchored grain bins from their bases. A water tank and a dumpster were also tossed.						
EF2	NE of Okaton to NNW of Murdo	Jones	SD	43.9379°N 100.83°W	03:28–03:38	3.89 mi (6.26 km)	80 yd (73 m)
EF2	A strong tornado struck two farms along its path. At the first farm, a house lost a quarter of its roof panels, two outbuildings were destroyed, a shed lost its roof, and a pickup truck had its back window blown out and sustained dents from flying debris. Debris was scattered for about a quarter of a mile away from the farm. At the second farm, a pole barn was destroyed with sheet metal being wrapped around trees. Debris tossed across a road into a neighboring pasture, including a large piece of wood that was impaled into the ground. A grain bin was also ripped from its foundation and tossed a quarter mile to the east as well.						
EFU	W of Lower Brule	Lyman	SD	44.07°N 99.78°W	04:50–04:51	0.24 mi (0.39 km)	10 yd (9.1 m)
EFU	A tornado was observed before it became rain-wrapped.						

=== June 13 event ===
List of confirmed tornadoes – Monday June 13, 2022
EF#	Location	County / Parish	State	Start Coord.	Time (UTC)	Path length	Max width
EF1	NE of Byington to S of Latham	Pike	OH	39.0942°N 83.2835°W	23:08–23:11	1.87 mi (3.01 km)	200 yd (180 m)
EF1	Aerial imagery revealed a brief tornado embedded within a much larger area of damaging straight-line winds. A garage which was heavily damaged with some of its debris thrown upwind and many trees were downed.						
EF0	Hoffman Estates	Cook	IL	42.0459°N 88.1784°W	23:13–23:14	0.2 mi (0.32 km)	30 yd (27 m)
EF0	A brief tornado touched down near the Arthur L. Janura Forest Preserve. Damage only occurred to trees.						
EF0	SSW of Schaumburg to SE of Roselle	Cook, DuPage	IL	42.0016°N 88.0813°W	23:27–23:32	2.2 mi (3.5 km)	25 yd (23 m)
EF0	A tornado embedded within a much larger area of damaging 60–70 mph (97–113 km/h) straight-line winds damaged mainly trees, lifting just before entering Medinah.						
EF0	NE of Philip	Haakon	SD	44.1219°N 101.556°W	01:50	0.02 mi (0.032 km)	10 yd (9.1 m)
EF0	A firefighter briefly observed a tornado. No damage was reported.						
EF1	Williamsport	Morrow	OH	40.5985°N 82.7479°W	03:17–03:20	3.08 mi (4.96 km)	25 yd (23 m)
EF1	Numerous farm buildings were damaged, with some roofs torn off and walls compromised. Farm equipment was moved, including a trailer that was tossed. Many trees were snapped and uprooted with evidence of convergence.						
EF1	Chesterville to SSW of Fredericktown	Morrow, Knox	OH	40.4807°N 82.6829°W	03:22–03:30	7.05 mi (11.35 km)	25 yd (23 m)
EF1	A barn and garage were destroyed with farm equipment moved 200–300 yards (180–270 m) and cinder blocks thrown across a street. Power poles were damaged. Numerous trees were snapped and uprooted with some falling on buildings. Farm fields showed convergent patterns.						
EF1	Newville to WSW of Loudonville	Richland, Ashland	OH	40.6266°N 82.416°W	03:32–03:38	5.67 mi (9.12 km)	100 yd (91 m)
EF1	An outbuilding was heavily damaged and trees were snapped or uprooted.						

=== June 14 event ===
List of confirmed tornadoes – Tuesday, June 14, 2022
EF#	Location	County / Parish	State	Start Coord.	Time (UTC)	Path length	Max width
EF1	N of Murdock	Cass	NE	40.96°N 96.3°W	04:27–04:29	2.16 mi (3.48 km)	150 yd (140 m)
EF1	A tornado developed within a several mile wide area of intense straight-line winds of over 80 mph (130 km/h). At beginning of the path, a home lost one of its roof peaks, its garage doors were blown in, and insulation was plastered to three of the home's exterior walls. Farther east, trees and grain bins were damaged, several power poles were snapped, and a church suffered minor damage.						

=== June 15 event ===
List of confirmed tornadoes – Wednesday, June 15, 2022
EF#	Location	County / Parish	State	Start Coord.	Time (UTC)	Path length	Max width
EF2	SW of Lushton to W of McCool Junction	York	NE	40.7081°N 97.7613°W	05:16–05:25	7.12 mi (11.46 km)	400 yd (370 m)
EF2	Several outbuildings and grain bins were destroyed, a garage was torn from a home, and some irrigation pivots were flipped at three farmsteads near the begninning of the path. Extensive tree damage occurred in Lushton, and a very large grain bin was destroyed in town. Multiple power poles were snapped northeast of Lushton, additional grain bins were destroyed, more irrigation pivots were overturned, and trees were damaged before the tornado dissipated west of McCool Junction. Two people were injured.						
EF0	S of Treynor	Pottawattamie	IA	41.19°N 95.61°W	05:18–05:19	2.38 mi (3.83 km)	75 yd (69 m)
EF0	This tornado struck a winery, destroying a frail event center building.						
EF2	S of Tomah to ESE of Mather	Monroe, Juneau	WI	43.8935°N 90.5149°W	20:57–21:34	22.86 mi (36.79 km)	250 yd (230 m)
EF2	A strong tornado embedded within a larger area of damaging straight-line winds passed near Wyeville and Oakdale, snapping and uprooting thousands of large trees, and snapping many power poles as well. A modular home was largely destroyed, a manufactured home was unroofed, other homes sustained considerable roof damage, and outbuildings were damaged or destroyed. The tornado entered the Necedah National Wildlife Refuge, downing additional trees there before dissipating. Two injuries also occurred.						
EF1	ENE of La Farge to SSW of Dilly	Vernon	WI	43.5848°N 90.5438°W	21:07–21:15	5.43 mi (8.74 km)	200 yd (180 m)
EF1	A house, outbuildings and a couple of campers were damaged along with numerous trees.						
EF1	Mauston to SSE of Germantown	Juneau	WI	43.7794°N 90.0921°W	21:43–21:52	8.20 mi (13.20 km)	100 yd (91 m)
EF1	Trees and power lines were downed in Mauston, antennas were bent on the roof of a Denny's, and another restaurant had its roof partially blown off. A two-story apartment building had part of its roof removed as well. Additional trees and power poles were snapped outside of town, and outbuilding damage occurred before the tornado dissipated near Germantown.						
EF1	ENE of Wittenberg to NNW of Bowler	Shawano	WI	44.8141°N 89.1262°W	22:34–22:46	9.5 mi (15.3 km)	125 yd (114 m)
EF1	Trees were snapped and uprooted. Some damage was noted to farms, outbuildings and homes in the area.						
EF1	West Bloomfield	Waushara	WI	44.1799°N 89.0045°W	22:41–22:47	4.81 mi (7.74 km)	100 yd (91 m)
EF1	Trees were snapped and uprooted, grain bins and outbuildings were damaged or destroyed, and a wagon was overturned. A fishing boat was pushed 15 ft (4.6 m) as well.						
EF1	NNE of Bowler	Shawano	WI	44.9245°N 88.9435°W	22:46–22:47	0.58 mi (0.93 km)	50 yd (46 m)
EF1	Trees were downed by this brief tornado.						
EF1	N of Manawa to SSE of Symco	Waupaca	WI	44.4673°N 88.94°W	22:52–22:56	3.1 mi (5.0 km)	120 yd (110 m)
EF1	An apartment building sustained heavy roof damage, trees were uprooted, and tree limbs were snapped. Outbuildings were damaged or destroyed, a metal flag pole was bent to the ground, and a wooden 2x4 was impaled into the porch pillar of a house.						
EF1	E of Leeman to Navarino to WSW of Landstad	Outagamie, Shawano	WI	44.5712°N 88.5323°W	23:09–23:18	8.22 mi (13.23 km)	80 yd (73 m)
EF1	Damage to power poles, farm buildings, and silos occurred in and around Navarino. Trees were snapped along the path as well.						
EF1	SE of Black Creek to ESE of Seymour	Outagamie	WI	44.4449°N 88.4702°W	23:10–23:20	9.37 mi (15.08 km)	400 yd (370 m)
EF1	Near Black Creek, this tornado damaged a home and destroyed its attached garage, and damaged or destroyed outbuildings and silos. The tornado struck the south edge of Seymour before dissipating, where an apartment complex sustained roof damage, a house had considerable roof and garage damage, and a barn was severely damaged. Trees and power poles were downed along the path.						
EF2	WSW of Athelstane	Marinette	WI	45.391°N 88.2852°W	23:31–23:35	1.9 mi (3.1 km)	375 yd (343 m)
EF2	A large swath of trees was completely flattened in Silver Cliff, with numerous large trees being snapped or uprooted. A metal fire department building was heavily damaged, a barn and a two-story outbuilding were shifted off their foundations, and other outbuildings were completely destroyed.						
EF1	WSW of Middle Inlet to ENE of Wausaukee	Marinette	WI	45.2945°N 88.013°W	23:34–23:41	6.6 mi (10.6 km)	200 yd (180 m)
EF1	A house sustained roof and siding damage, and trees were snapped and uprooted. Barns, outbuildings, and silos were damaged or destroyed.						
EF1	NNW of Athelstane to SE of Beecher Lake	Marinette	WI	45.5032°N 88.1329°W	23:45–23:54	8.5 mi (13.7 km)	120 yd (110 m)
EF1	Many trees were downed along the path of this tornado.						
EF1	ENE of Kremlin	Marinette	WI	45.6787°N 87.7955°W	00:00–00:04	0.65 mi (1.05 km)	115 yd (105 m)
EF1	A brief tornado downed numerous trees.						
EF0	Southern Madison	Greenwood	KS	38.1289°N 96.1381°W	02:20–02:24	0.42 mi (0.68 km)	100 yd (91 m)
EF0	A brief tornado destroyed a carport with debris from the structures being blown in all directions, damaged trees, peeled a section of a metal roof off a shed, and knocked down a portion of a fence.						

=== June 16 event ===
List of confirmed tornadoes – Thursday, June 16, 2022
EF#	Location	County / Parish	State	Start Coord.	Time (UTC)	Path length	Max width
EF0	NE of Lamar	Darlington	SC	34.24°N 80.02°W	22:27–22:34	3.7 mi (6.0 km)	25 yd (23 m)
EF0	A high-end EF0 tornado flipped a large agricultural irrigation system in a corn field. Moving southeastward, the tornado inflicted minor flashing and roof shingle damage to a church, destroyed an outdoor storage building, and knocked down a few granite headstones at an adjacent graveyard. After crossing over US 401, the tornado ripped the metal roof off a single wide mobile home and caused minor roof damage to a home before dissipating. Numerous trees were snapped along the path as well.						
EF0	W of Mineral	Louisa	VA	38.02°N 77.93°W	22:36–22:40	2.14 mi (3.44 km)	75 yd (69 m)
EF0	Trees and power lines were downed along the path.						
EF1	N of Kents Store to SE of Goochland	Fluvanna, Goochland, Powhatan	VA	37.91°N 78.13°W	23:05–23:56	21.48 mi (34.57 km)	150 yd (140 m)
EF1	A long-lived tornado reached its peak intensity in the Rock Castle area, where 16 homes were damaged. Trees were also uprooted and damaged along the path.						
EF0	NE of Wilmington to SE of Michaux	Fluvanna, Goochland, Powhatan	VA	37.89°N 78.18°W	23:36–00:12	23.5 mi (37.8 km)	75 yd (69 m)
EF0	This tornado was produced by a supercell just northwest of the one that produced the previous tornado. Some tree damage was observed.						

=== June 17 event ===
List of confirmed tornadoes – Friday June 17, 2022
EF#	Location	County / Parish	State	Start Coord.	Time (UTC)	Path length	Max width
EF1	SE of Passport to NW of Olney	Richland	IL	38.7746°N 88.2455°W	11:36–11:44	3.31 mi (5.33 km)	60 yd (55 m)
EF1	Tornado knocked down multiple power poles, caused tree damage and partially removed the roofing of a barn.						
EF0	SW of Tar Heel	Robeson	NC	34.71°N 78.84°W	00:06–00:08	0.69 mi (1.11 km)	30 yd (27 m)
EF0	A brief tornado uprooted several trees near Tar Heel.						

=== June 19 event ===
List of confirmed tornadoes – Sunday June 19, 2022
EF#	Location	County / Parish	State	Start Coord.	Time (UTC)	Path length	Max width
EF2	N of Castle Gate	Duchesne	UT	39.882°N 110.7445°W	15:13–15:17	2.08 mi (3.35 km)	880 yd (800 m)
EF2	A large, strong tornado developed near US-191 in remote southwestern Duchesne County. Almost all trees along a large hillside were mowed down, and additional extensive tree damage was noted immediately north of US-191 where numerous trees were snapped or uprooted. This was the first Utah F/EF2 tornado in 20 years.						

=== June 20 event ===
List of confirmed tornadoes – Monday, June 20, 2022
EF#	Location	County / Parish	State	Start Coord.	Time (UTC)	Path length	Max width
EF0	S of Stockwood	Clay	MN	46.86°N 96.50°W	23:51–23:52	0.19 mi (0.31 km)	100 yd (91 m)
EF0	A trained spotter reported a rief tornado tracked through open fields.						
EF1	SW of Fossum to WSW of Faith	Norman	MN	47.22°N 96.20°W	00:17–00:23	4.87 mi (7.84 km)	150 yd (140 m)
EF1	The tornado was likely wrapped in downburst winds and rain. Tornado snapped poplar and ash trees.						
EF1	E of Solway	Beltrami	MN	47.4758°N 95.1275°W	01:20–01:24	3.65 mi (5.87 km)	150 yd (140 m)
EF1	Numerous large trees were snapped and a few were uprooted; some power lines were downed due to fallen trees.						
EF1	S of Osceola	Beadle, Kingsbury	SD	44.43°N 97.858°W	02:30–02:34	3.65 mi (5.87 km)	50 yd (46 m)
EF1	A brief tornado snapped utility poles.						
EF1	SW of Osceola	Beadle	SD	44.45°N 97.897°W	02:31–02:32	0.50 mi (0.80 km)	50 yd (46 m)
EF1	A brief tornado snapped utility poles.						
EFU	ESE of Bancroft	Kingsbury	SD	44.476°N 97.633°W	02:44	0.01 mi (0.016 km)	10 yd (9.1 m)
EFU	A trained spotter observed a brief tornado. No damage was reported.						

=== June 21 event ===
List of confirmed tornadoes – Tuesday June 21, 2022
EF#	Location	County / Parish	State	Start Coord.	Time (UTC)	Path length	Max width
EF0	N of Minneola	Ford	KS	37.5099°N 99.9904°W	23:19–23:21	0.26 mi (0.42 km)	20 yd (18 m)
EF0	Very weak landspout documented with an image taken by a trained storm spotter. No damage occurred.						

=== June 23 event ===
List of confirmed tornadoes – Thursday, June 23, 2022
EF#	Location	County / Parish	State	Start Coord.	Time (UTC)	Path length	Max width
EF0	WNW of Angell	Coconino	AZ	35.16°N 111.27°W	21:00–21:15	0.1 mi (0.16 km)	10 yd (9.1 m)
EF0	A landspout was seen on the ground for about 15 minutes.						
EFU	SSE of Stanfield	Pinal	AZ	32.9011°N 112.0261°W	21:03–21:08	0.6 mi (0.97 km)	15 yd (14 m)
EFU	Multiple storm chasers took photos of a landspout.						
EFU	NNE of Bunker Hill	Russell	KS	38.90°N 98.66°W	22:25–22:26	0.1 mi (0.16 km)	50 yd (46 m)
EFU	A brief tornado touched down over open country.						
EFU	N of Dorrance	Russell	KS	38.86°N 98.58°W	22:54–22:55	0.1 mi (0.16 km)	50 yd (46 m)
EFU	A trained spotter reported a brief tornado touchdown over open country.						
EFU	S of Sylvan Grove	Lincoln	KS	38.93°N 98.39°W	23:20–23:21	0.1 mi (0.16 km)	50 yd (46 m)
EFU	A brief tornado touched down over open country.						
EFU	SSE of Vesper	Lincoln	KS	38.88°N 98.23°W	23:39–23:40	0.1 mi (0.16 km)	50 yd (46 m)
EFU	A brief tornado touched down over open country.						
EFU	S of Glendale	Saline	KS	38.84°N 97.87°W	00:26–00:27	0.1 mi (0.16 km)	50 yd (46 m)
EFU	A trained spotter reported a brief touchdown over open country.						
EFU	SW of Glendale	Saline	KS	38.87°N 97.91°W	00:30–00:31	0.1 mi (0.16 km)	50 yd (46 m)
EFU	A brief tornado touched down over open country.						

=== June 24 event ===
List of confirmed tornadoes – Friday June 24, 2022
EF#	Location	County / Parish	State	Start Coord.	Time (UTC)	Path length	Max width
EF0	WSW of Milton	Cavalier	ND	48.61°N 98.1°W	19:56–19:58	2 mi (3.2 km)	10 yd (9.1 m)
EF0	The tornado produced a fairly wide dust plume as it moved across an open field. No damage occurred.						
EF1	ENE of Adams to WSW of Edinburg	Walsh	ND	48.45°N 97.96°W	20:27–20:33	2.24 mi (3.60 km)	100 yd (91 m)
EF1	Numerous trees were snapped through several field shelter belts.						
EFU	N of Chaseley	Wells	ND	47.5707°N 99.8147°W	20:42–20:45	0.25 mi (0.40 km)	25 yd (23 m)
EFU	This tornado touched down in an open field and did no damage.						
EF0	NW of Tolna	Nelson	ND	47.86°N 98.49°W	21:52–21:53	0.69 mi (1.11 km)	100 yd (91 m)
EF0	A brief tornado was filmed by storm chasers.						
EF0	NNW of Pekin	Nelson	ND	47.83°N 98.35°W	22:01–22:02	0.42 mi (0.68 km)	100 yd (91 m)
EF0	The tornado produced a fairly wide dust plume as it moved across an open field. No damage occurred.						
EF0	N of McVille	Nelson	ND	47.82°N 98.18°W	22:15–22:16	0.98 mi (1.58 km)	100 yd (91 m)
EF0	The tornado remained on the ground for one minute near McVille. No damage occurred.						
EF0	WNW of Larimore	Grand Forks	ND	47.92°N 97.69°W	22:34–22:40	2.94 mi (4.73 km)	100 yd (91 m)
EF0	Some tree branches were snapped by this weak tornado.						
EFU	NNW of Benkelman	Dundy	NE	40.1009°N 101.5758°W	01:40–01:43	2.07 mi (3.33 km)	50 yd (46 m)
EFU	A landspout tornado was observed by trained spotters as it tracked through open fields.						
EF1	WSW of Naytahwaush	Mahnomen	MN	47.25°N 95.68°W	02:16–02:23	3.82 mi (6.15 km)	400 yd (370 m)
EF1	This tornado was likely wrapped in downburst winds, and snapped or uprooted trees along its path. A few roofs were damaged as well.						
EF0	N of Erie	Pennington	MN	48.13°N 95.66°W	02:16–02:17	0.06 mi (0.097 km)	40 yd (37 m)
EF0	Law enforcement reported a brief touchdown in an open field.						
EF2	Rochert to SE of Menahga	Becker, Wadena	MN	46.86°N 95.69°W	02:58–03:35	30.9 mi (49.7 km)	600 yd (550 m)
EF2	This tornado was likely wrapped in downburst winds, and snapped numerous large trees along its path. Several wooden power poles were snapped, and many outbuildings were destroyed at various farmsteads.						

=== June 25 event ===
List of confirmed tornadoes – Saturday, June 25, 2022
EF#	Location	County / Parish	State	Start Coord.	Time (UTC)	Path length	Max width
EF0	WSW of Jerome	Yavapai	AZ	34.72°N 112.26°W	21:43–21:50	0.1 mi (0.16 km)	10 yd (9.1 m)
EF0	A landspout tornado was observed.						

=== June 26 event ===
List of confirmed tornadoes – Sunday June 26, 2022
EF#	Location	County / Parish	State	Start Coord.	Time (UTC)	Path length	Max width
EF1	ESE of Brookhaven	Lincoln	MS	31.5617°N 90.3956°W	00:29–00:36	2.31 mi (3.72 km)	300 yd (270 m)
EF1	A tornado developed in central Lincoln County, uprooting several small trees and larger branches. Continuing southwest, numerous trees were snapped, and a roof was damaged. After crossing MS 583, the tornado continued for several more miles uprooting several more trees and damaging a mobile home before dissipating.						

=== June 30 event ===
List of confirmed tornadoes – Thursday, June 30, 2022
EF#	Location	County / Parish	State	Start Coord.	Time (UTC)	Path length	Max width
EF0	Vidrine	Evangeline	LA	30.68°N 92.40°W	16:00–16:01	0.05 mi (0.080 km)	10 yd (9.1 m)
EF0	A tornado briefly touched down in a field. No damage was reported.						
EF0	NW of Fort Pierce	St. Lucie	FL	27.51°N 80.38°W	16:57	0.01 mi (0.016 km)	10 yd (9.1 m)
EF0	ATC at Treasure Coast International Airport observed a tornado briefly touch down north of the airport. No damage was reported.						

== See also ==
- Tornadoes of 2022
- List of United States tornadoes in April 2022
- List of United States tornadoes from July to October 2022
- List of tornadoes with confirmed satellite tornadoes
