= Cushing Township, Morrison County, Minnesota =

Cushing Township, Minnesota
- Township
- Location within the state of Minnesota Cushing Township, Minnesota (the United States)
- Coordinates: 46°8′51″N 94°28′8″W
- Country: United States
- State: Minnesota
- County: Morrison

Area
  - Total: 79.9 sq mi (207.0 km^{2})
  - Land: 77.8 sq mi (201.5 km^{2})
  - Water: 2.1 sq mi (5.5 km^{2})
- Elevation: 1,283 ft (391 m)

Population (2000)
  - Total: 632
  - Density: 8.0/sq mi (3.1/km^{2})
- Time zone: UTC-6 (Central (CST))
  - Summer (DST): UTC-5 (CDT)
- ZIP code: 56443
- Area code: 218/320
- FIPS code: 27-14356
- GNIS feature ID: 0663908

Cushing Township is a township in Morrison County, Minnesota, United States. The population was 632 at the 2000 census. The unincorporated community of Cushing is located within the township.

Cushing Township was organized in 1891.

== Geography ==
According to the United States Census Bureau, the township has a total area of 79.9 square miles (207 km^{2}), of which 77.8 square miles (202 km^{2}) is land and 2.1 square miles (5.4 km^{2}) (2.67%) is water.

== Demographics ==
As of the census of 2000, there were 632 people, 214 households, and 170 families residing in the township. The population density was 8.1 inhabitants per square mile (3.1/km^{2}). There were 299 housing units at an average density of 3.8 per square mile (1.5/km^{2}). The racial makeup of the township was 98.58% White, 1.11% African American, 0.16% Native American and 0.16% Asian.

There were 214 households, out of which 42.5% had children under the age of 18 living with them, 73.4% were married couples living together, 3.3% had a female householder with no husband present, and 20.1% were non-families. 16.8% of all households were made up of individuals, and 5.1% had someone living alone who was 65 years of age or older. The average household size was 2.95 and the average family size was 3.31.

In the township the population was spread out, with 32.9% under the age of 18, 6.8% from 18 to 24, 26.6% from 25 to 44, 24.8% from 45 to 64, and 8.9% who were 65 years of age or older. The median age was 37 years. For every 100 females, there were 110.0 males. For every 100 females age 18 and over, there were 114.1 males.

The median income for a household in the township was $41,591, and the median income for a family was $46,250. Males had a median income of $35,000 versus $21,042 for females. The per capita income for the township was $16,470. About 7.2% of families and 12.1% of the population were below the poverty line, including 15.9% of those under age 18 and 3.4% of those age 65 or over.
