= Albee, South Dakota =

- Town
- Location in Grant County and the state of South Dakota
- Coordinates: 45°03′05″N 96°33′13″W
- Country: United States
- State: South Dakota
- County: Grant
- Incorporated: 1902

Area
  - Total: 0.13 sq mi (0.34 km^{2})
  - Land: 0.13 sq mi (0.34 km^{2})
  - Water: 0 sq mi (0.00 km^{2})
- Elevation: 1,178 ft (359 m)

Population (2020)
  - Total: 7
  - Density: 53.6/sq mi (20.69/km^{2})
- Time zone: UTC-6 (Central (CST))
  - Summer (DST): UTC-5 (CDT)
- ZIP code: 57259
- Area code: 605
- FIPS code: 46-00620
- GNIS feature ID: 1267261

Albee is a town in Grant County, South Dakota, United States. The population was 7 at the 2020 census.

== History ==
A post office called Albee was established in 1888, and remained in operation until 1992. The community was named in honor of W. C. Albee, a railroad official.

== Geography ==
According to the United States Census Bureau, the town has a total area of 0.13 square miles (0.34 km^{2}), all land.

== Demographics ==
Historical population
Census	Pop.	Note	%±
1910	131		—
1920	115		−12.2%
1930	94		−18.3%
1940	114		21.3%
1950	75		−34.2%
1960	42		−44.0%
1970	26		−38.1%
1980	23		−11.5%
1990	15		−34.8%
2000	10		−33.3%
2010	16		60.0%
2020	7		−56.2%
U.S. Decennial Census

=== 2010 census ===
As of the census of 2010, there were 16 people, 7 households, and 4 families residing in the town. The population density was 123.1 inhabitants per square mile (47.5/km^{2}). There were 7 housing units at an average density of 53.8 per square mile (20.8/km^{2}). The racial makeup of the town was 100.0% White.

There were 7 households, of which 28.6% had children under the age of 18 living with them, 42.9% were married couples living together, 14.3% had a female householder with no husband present, and 42.9% were non-families. 42.9% of all households were made up of individuals, and 28.6% had someone living alone who was 65 years of age or older. The average household size was 2.29 and the average family size was 3.00.

The median age in the town was 34 years. 25% of residents were under the age of 18; 6.4% were between the ages of 18 and 24; 31.3% were from 25 to 44; 25.1% were from 45 to 64; and 12.5% were 65 years of age or older. The gender makeup of the town was 43.8% male and 56.3% female.

=== 2000 census ===
As of the census of 2000, there were 10 people, 6 households, and 3 families residing in the town. The population density was 75.7 inhabitants per square mile (29.2/km^{2}). There were 6 housing units at an average density of 45.4 per square mile (17.5/km^{2}). The racial makeup of the town was 100.00% White.

There were 6 households, out of which 16.7% had children under the age of 18 living with them, 50.0% were married couples living together, and 50.0% were non-families. 50.0% of all households were made up of individuals, and 16.7% had someone living alone who was 65 years of age or older. The average household size was 1.67 and the average family size was 2.33.

In the town, the population was spread out, with 10.0% under the age of 18, 50.0% from 25 to 44, 30.0% from 45 to 64, and 10.0% who were 65 years of age or older. The median age was 42 years. For every 100 females, there were 150.0 males. For every 100 females age 18 and over, there were 125.0 males.

The median income for a household in the town was $23,750, and the median income for a family was $27,500. Males had a median income of $18,750 versus $0 for females. The per capita income for the town was $10,744. None of the population or families were below the poverty line.
