= Wilmington, Virginia =

Unincorporated community in Virginia, United States

Coordinates: 37°50′58″N 78°12′05″W

Wilmington is an unincorporated community in Fluvanna County, in the U.S. state of Virginia.
