= Passport, Illinois =

- Unincorporated community
- Location within Illinois Location within the United States
- Coordinates: 38°47′21″N 88°14′37″W
- Country: United States
- State: Illinois
- County: Richland
- Elevation: 466 ft (142 m)
- Time zone: UTC-6 (Central (CST))
  - Summer (DST): UTC-5 (CDT)
- Area code: 618
- GNIS feature ID: 415427

Passport is an unincorporated community located in Richland County, Illinois, United States. Passport is positioned 6.5 miles (10.5 km) east-northeast of Sailor Springs, and 6 miles due north of Noble, Illinois.
