= Hancock, Minnesota =

City in Minnesota, United States

Hancock
- City
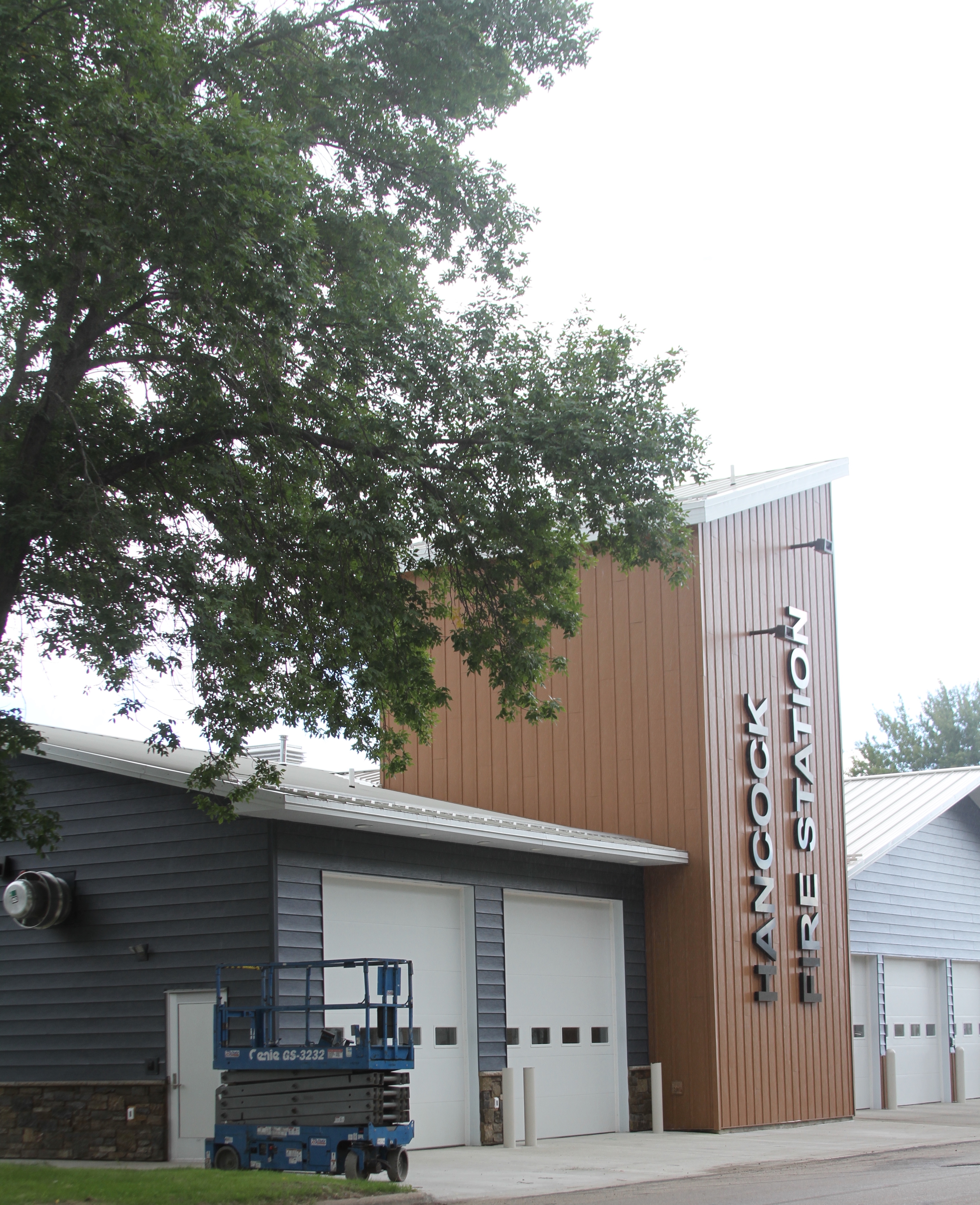
- Fire department
- Motto(s): "Community you know, place to grow"
- Location of Hancock, Minnesota
- Coordinates: 45°29′52″N 95°47′42″W
- Country: United States
- State: Minnesota
- County: Stevens
- Established: 1872

Area
  - Total: 0.90 sq mi (2.34 km^{2})
  - Land: 0.90 sq mi (2.34 km^{2})
  - Water: 0 sq mi (0.00 km^{2})
- Elevation: 1,158 ft (353 m)

Population (2020)
  - Total: 863
  - Density: 956.1/sq mi (369.14/km^{2})
- Time zone: UTC-6 (CST)
  - Summer (DST): UTC-5 (CDT)
- ZIP code: 56244
- Area code: 320
- FIPS code: 27-26936
- GNIS feature ID: 2394283
- Website: www.cityofhancockmn.com

Hancock is a city in Stevens County, Minnesota, United States. The population was 863 at the 2020 census.

== History ==
Hancock was laid out in 1871 when the Great Northern Railway was extended to that point. The city was named for Joseph Woods Hancock, a county official. A post office has been in operation at Hancock since 1871.

== Geography ==
Hancock is a city in Stevens County, Minnesota. Minnesota Highway 9 serves as a main route in the community. According to the United States Census Bureau, the city has a total area of 1.0 square miles (2.6 km^{2}), of which 1.00% is water. The elevation is 1,155 ft (352 m) above sea level.

== Demographics ==
Historical population
Census	Pop.	Note	%±
1880	91		—
1890	218		139.6%
1900	415		90.4%
1910	524		26.3%
1920	763		45.6%
1930	798		4.6%
1940	827		3.6%
1950	852		3.0%
1960	942		10.6%
1970	806		−14.4%
1980	877		8.8%
1990	723		−17.6%
2000	717		−0.8%
2010	765		6.7%
2020	863		12.8%
U.S. Decennial Census; 2020 Census

=== 2010 census ===
As of the census of 2010, there were 765 people, 302 households, and 197 families residing in the city. The population density was 772.7 inhabitants per square mile (298.3/km^{2}). There were 334 housing units at an average density of 337.4 per square mile (130.3/km^{2}). The racial makeup of the city was 97.8% White, 0.5% Native American, 0.1% Asian, 1.2% from other races, and 0.4% from two or more races. Hispanic or Latino of any race were 3.7% of the population.

There were 302 households, of which 32.1% had children under the age of 18 living with them, 54.6% were married couples living together, 6.3% had a female householder with no husband present, 4.3% had a male householder with no wife present, and 34.8% were non-families. 29.1% of all households were made up of individuals, and 13.2% had someone living alone who was 65 years of age or older. The average household size was 2.51 and the average family size was 3.09.

The median age in the city was 34.4 years. 27.5% of residents were under the age of 18; 9.2% were between the ages of 18 and 24; 25.7% were from 25 to 44; 24.7% were from 45 to 64; and 12.8% were 65 years of age or older. The gender makeup of the city was 52.3% male and 47.7% female.

=== 2000 census ===
As of the census of 2000, there were 717 people, 294 households, and 186 families residing in the city. The population density was 724.5 inhabitants per square mile (279.7/km^{2}). There were 325 housing units at an average density of 328.4 per square mile (126.8/km^{2}). The racial makeup of the city was 98.19% White, 0.14% African American (one African American resident), 0.14% Native American (one Native American), 0.28% Asian (two Asians), and 1.26% from two or more races. Hispanic or Latino of any race were 0.28% of the population.

There were 294 households, out of which 30.6% had children under the age of 18 living with them, 54.1% were married couples living together, 7.5% had a female householder with no husband present, and 36.4% were non-families. Some 32.7% of all households were made up of individuals, and 17.0% had someone living alone who was 65 years of age or older. The average household size was 2.34 and the average family size was 3.01.

In the city, the population was spread out, with 24.7% under the age of 18, 8.8% from 18 to 24, 24.3% from 25 to 44, 23.2% from 45 to 64, and 19.1% who were 65 years of age or older. The median age was 40 years. For every 100 females, there were 106.0 males. For every 100 females age 18 and over, there were 102.2 males.

The median income for a household in the city was $34,583, and the median income for a family was $40,938. Males had a median income of $30,446 versus $20,114 for females. The per capita income for the city was $17,012. About 2.7% of families and 8.0% of the population were below the poverty line, including none of those under age 18 and 7.5% of those age 65 or over.

== Arts and culture ==
=== Annual cultural events ===
Hancock holds an annual community celebration every July 4. The celebration has been held since the 1870s and includes baseball, parades, dances and fireworks.

== Education ==
Hancock Public Schools are part of the Hancock Public School District. Schools in the district include Hancock Elementary School and Hancock High School. The average class size is around 12 to 25 students and has been growing in recent years. The building that houses the K-12 school was expanded in 2012 and in 2020.

== Infrastructure ==
=== Transportation ===
Minnesota State Highway 9 serves as a main route in the community.
