= Erie, Minnesota =

Erie
- Unincorporated community
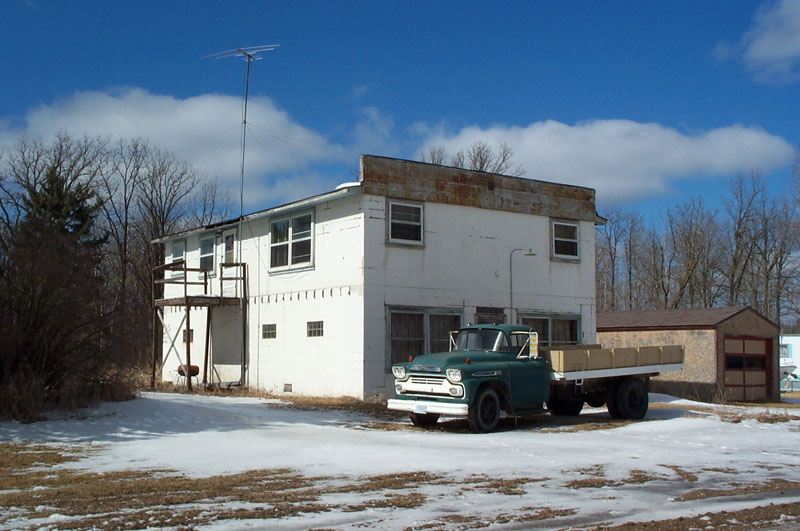
- Building in Erie

- Location within Minnesota Location within the United States
- Coordinates: 48.0702386°N 95.7219580°W
- Country: United States
- State: Minnesota
- County: Pennington
- Elevation: 1,171 ft (357 m)
- Time zone: UTC-6 (Central (CST))
  - Summer (DST): UTC-5 (CDT)
- Area code: 218
- GNIS feature ID: 1989114

Erie is a small unincorporated community in Pennington County, Minnesota, United States. The community had local businesses until the late 20th century with the closing of its last store, Sjulstad Store.

A post office called Erie was established in 1905, and remained in operation until 1938. The community was named after Erie, Pennsylvania.
