= Loyal, Oklahoma =

- Town
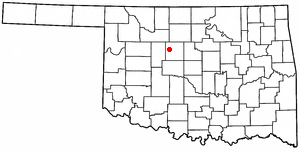
- Location of Loyal, Oklahoma
- Coordinates: 35°58′22″N 98°07′05″W
- Country: United States
- State: Oklahoma
- County: Kingfisher

Area
  - Total: 0.089 sq mi (0.23 km^{2})
  - Land: 0.089 sq mi (0.23 km^{2})
  - Water: 0 sq mi (0.00 km^{2})
- Elevation: 1,116 ft (340 m)

Population (2020)
  - Total: 71
  - Density: 797.8/sq mi (308.02/km^{2})
- Time zone: UTC-6 (Central (CST))
  - Summer (DST): UTC-5 (CDT)
- ZIP code: 73756
- Area codes: 405/572
- FIPS code: 40-44300
- GNIS feature ID: 2412923

Loyal is a town in Kingfisher County, Oklahoma, United States. As of the 2020 census, Loyal had a population of 71.

== History ==
A large share of the early settlers being natives of Germany, the original name of the settlement was "Kiel", after the city in northern Germany. In 1917 following American entry into World War I, the name was changed to "Loyal" due to rampant anti-German sentiment. Some direct descendants of Johann Sebastian Bach lived in Loyal, through his eldest son Wilhelm Friedemann Bach and his illegitimate grandchild. The street Friedemann Avenue is named after this family.

== Geography ==
Loyal is located in western Kingfisher County 18 miles (29 km) northwest of Kingfisher, the county seat.

According to the United States Census Bureau, the town has a total area of 0.081 square miles (0.21 km^{2}), all land. The town sits next to Cooper Creek, an east-flowing tributary of the Cimarron River.

== Demographics ==
Historical population
Census	Pop.	Note	%±
1940	177		—
1950	125		−29.4%
1960	87		−30.4%
1970	107		23.0%
1980	112		4.7%
1990	76		−32.1%
2000	81		6.6%
2010	79		−2.5%
2020	71		−10.1%
U.S. Decennial Census

=== 2020 census ===
As of the 2020 census, Loyal had a population of 71. The median age was 43.5 years. 22.5% of residents were under the age of 18 and 23.9% of residents were 65 years of age or older. For every 100 females there were 129.0 males, and for every 100 females age 18 and over there were 120.0 males age 18 and over.

0.0% of residents lived in urban areas, while 100.0% lived in rural areas.

There were 35 households in Loyal, of which 45.7% had children under the age of 18 living in them. Of all households, 57.1% were married-couple households, 8.6% were households with a male householder and no spouse or partner present, and 20.0% were households with a female householder and no spouse or partner present. About 17.1% of all households were made up of individuals and 8.6% had someone living alone who was 65 years of age or older.

There were 37 housing units, of which 5.4% were vacant. The homeowner vacancy rate was 4.0% and the rental vacancy rate was 0.0%.

Racial composition as of the 2020 census
Race	Number	Percent
White	47	66.2%
Black or African American	3	4.2%
American Indian and Alaska Native	5	7.0%
Asian	0	0.0%
Native Hawaiian and Other Pacific Islander	0	0.0%
Some other race	6	8.5%
Two or more races	10	14.1%
Hispanic or Latino (of any race)	11	15.5%

=== 2000 census ===
As of the census of 2000, there were 81 people, 35 households, and 22 families residing in the town. The population density was 1,030.2 inhabitants per square mile (397.8/km^{2}). There were 43 housing units at an average density of 546.9 per square mile (211.2/km^{2}). The racial makeup of the town was 81.48% White, 6.17% Native American, 9.88% from other races, and 2.47% from two or more races. Hispanic or Latino of any race were 9.88% of the population.

There were 35 households, out of which 31.4% had children under the age of 18 living with them, 45.7% were married couples living together, 14.3% had a female householder with no husband present, and 34.3% were non-families. 31.4% of all households were made up of individuals, and 11.4% had someone living alone who was 65 years of age or older. The average household size was 2.31 and the average family size was 2.65.

In the town, the population was spread out, with 28.4% under the age of 18, 4.9% from 18 to 24, 29.6% from 25 to 44, 28.4% from 45 to 64, and 8.6% who were 65 years of age or older. The median age was 38 years. For every 100 females, there were 72.3 males. For every 100 females age 18 and over, there were 81.3 males.

The median income for a household in the town was $18,750, and the median income for a family was $21,250. Males had a median income of $32,500 versus $20,625 for females. The per capita income for the town was $12,673. There were 38.1% of families and 34.2% of the population living below the poverty line, including 35.0% of under eighteens and none of those over 64.

== Notable person ==
- Al Brazle, baseball player
