= Cushing, Minnesota =

- Unincorporated community
- Location within Minnesota Location within the United States
- Coordinates: 46°08′23″N 94°34′37″W
- Country: United States
- State: Minnesota
- County: Morrison
- Township: Cushing
- Elevation: 1,266 ft (386 m)
- Time zone: UTC-6 (Central (CST))
  - Summer (DST): UTC-5 (CDT)
- ZIP code: 56443
- Area code: 320 / 218
- GNIS feature ID: 642566

Cushing is an unincorporated community in Cushing Township, Morrison County, Minnesota, United States. The community is along U.S. Highway 10 near Morrison County Road 5, Bear Road. Nearby places include Randall, Little Falls, and Motley.

The community is home to a post office, a park, a bar, and a church. The town hall for surrounding Cushing Township is in Cushing. The BNSF Railway passes through the community.

== History ==
Cushing was platted in 1907. According to Warren Upham, the community was probably named after Caleb Cushing, a politician from Massachusetts.

== Tourism ==
Lake Alexander is in Cushing. Several resorts, including the Silver Moon, Ray's Resort, and The Shady Inn were popular summer campgrounds and rentals on "Lake Alex" in the 1950s through the 1990s. A local favorite, The Blue Front Resort, boasted overnight and seasonal camping, in addition to four cabins, a store, and a 3.2 bar with a jukebox, pool table, and pinball machines. All resorts have since closed to the public.

== Transportation ==
Amtrak's Empire Builder, which operates between Seattle/Portland and Chicago, passes through the town on BNSF tracks, but makes no stop. The nearest station is in Staples, 23 miles (37 km) northwest.
