= Leaf River =

Leaf River may refer to:

== Rivers ==
=== Canada ===
- Leaf River (Quebec)

=== United States ===
- Leaf River (Illinois)
- Leaf River (Minnesota)
- Leaf River (Mississippi)

== Cities and towns ==
- Leaf River, Illinois
- Leaf River, Minnesota, former town

== Townships ==
- Leaf River Township, Illinois
- Leaf River Township, Wadena County, Minnesota

== See also ==
- Leaf (disambiguation)
