= Leaf River Township =

Leaf River Township may refer to the following townships in the United States:

- Leaf River Township, Wadena County, Minnesota
- Leaf River Township, Ogle County, Illinois

== See also ==
- Leaf River (disambiguation)
