= Old Wadena Historic District =

Historical archaeology sites in Wadena County, Minnesota, US

- U.S. National Register of Historic Places
- U.S. Historic district
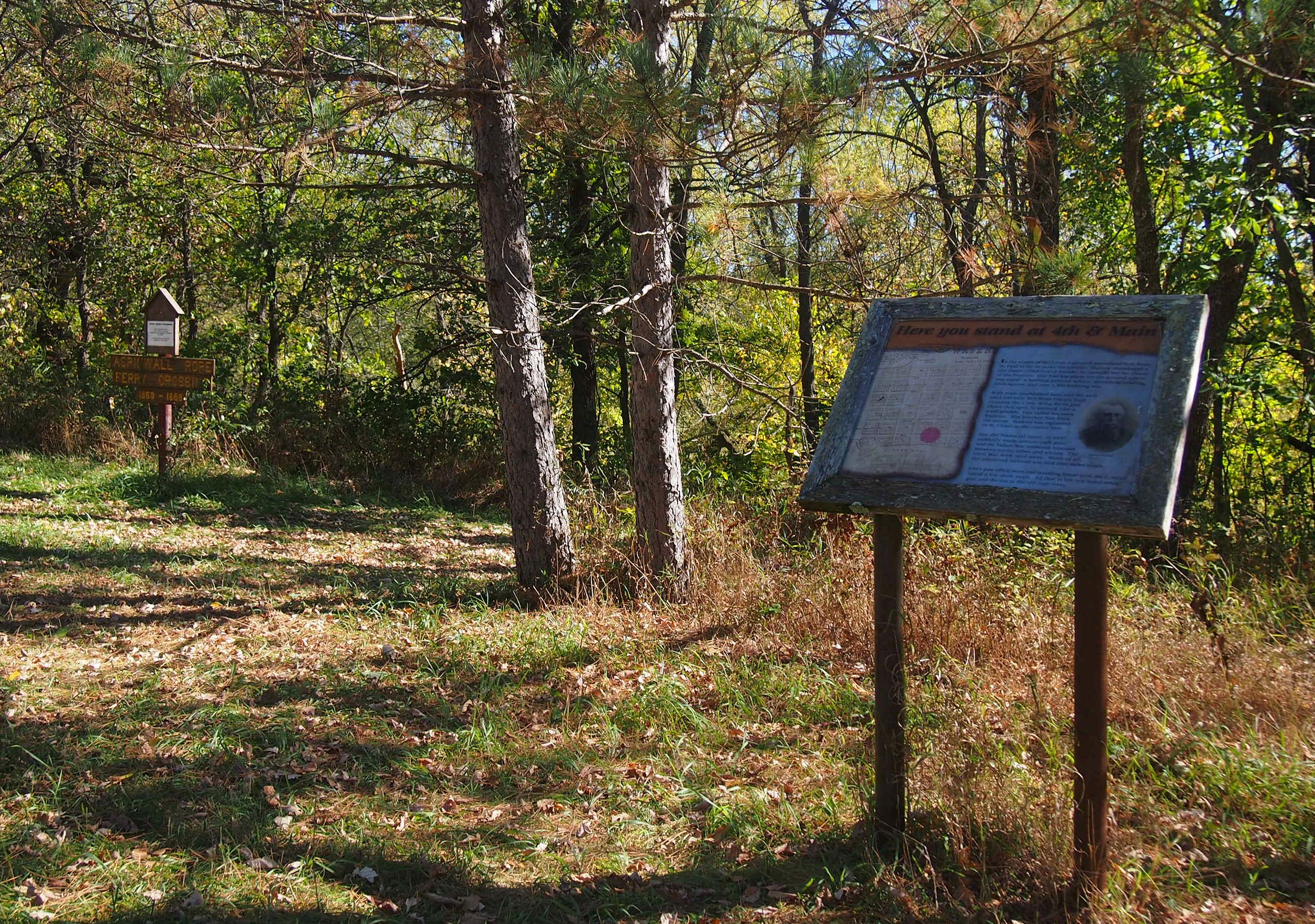
- Signs marking features of Old Wadena

- Location within Minnesota Location within the United States
- Location: Old Wadena County Park, Thomastown Township, Minnesota
- Coordinates: 46°25′18″N 94°49′47″W
- Built: 1782, 1792, 1825, 1856
- NRHP reference No.: 73000997
- Designated HD: October 9, 1973

The Old Wadena Historic District is a concentration of historical archaeology sites now largely contained within Old Wadena County Park in Thomastown Township, Minnesota, United States. Features include the sites of four successive trading posts established in 1782, 1792, 1825, and 1856; the original townsite of Wadena on the Red River Trails; and the county's first farm. The town was later moved 3.5 miles (5.6 km) south to its present location. The historic district was listed on the National Register of Historic Places in 1973 for having state-level significance in the themes of agriculture, non-aboriginal archaeology, and transportation. It was nominated for its archaeological potential at the seminal site of Euro-American activity in Wadena County, Minnesota.

== Little Round Hill Trading Post ==
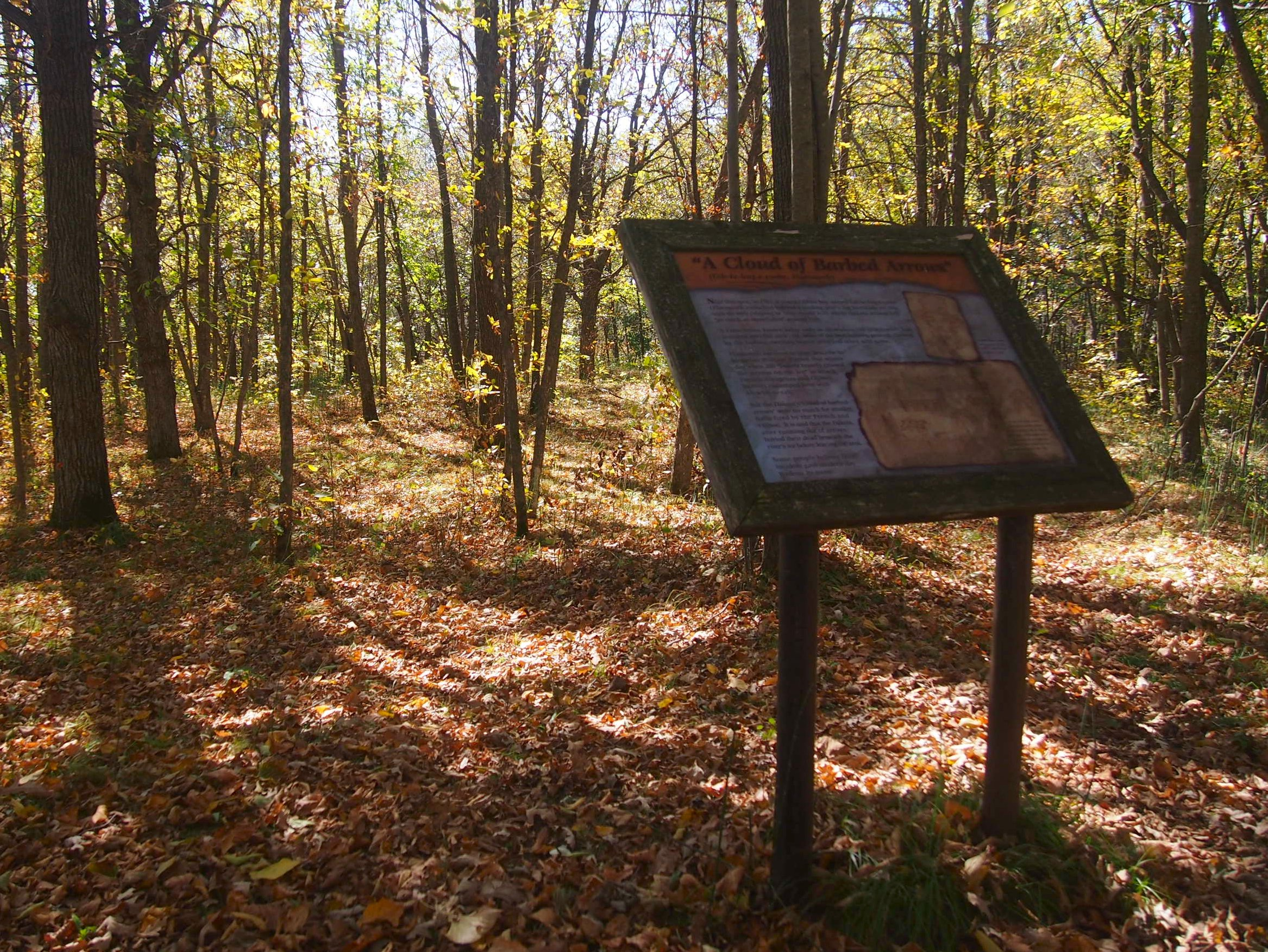
Interpretive marker at the site of the Battle of Partridge River

The woods and rivers of what became Wadena County offered ample food resources, habitable areas, and well-situated water transportation routes. However, as the first Euro-Americans entered the region it was on the hotly contested border between the Ojibwe and Dakota people. Métis historian William Whipple Warren recorded Ojibwe stories of a French-Canadian fur trader, known to them only as Ah-wish-to-yah ("Blacksmith"), who led a party of 20 into the area in 1782. They selected a site for a trading post at the confluence of the Crow Wing and Partridge Rivers which they dubbed Wadena ("Little Round Hill" in the Ojibwe language). Knowing they were in hostile territory they erected a wooden palisade or fence around the post, within which the Ojibwe party members erected their wigwams.

The Dakota did not look kindly on this incursion, and a force of 200 warriors attacked the post. According to Warren's sources, the Dakotas' bows and arrows were no match for the traders' firearms and were easily repulsed in the Battle of Partridge River. However the traders immediately abandoned the post and Euro-Americans avoided the area for nearly a decade.

Archaeological excavations on the site have discovered a potsherd, a rosehead nail, an axe, a fire striker, and fragments of a kettle.

== Cadotte's Trading Post ==
In 1792 fur trader Jean Baptiste Cadotte, Jr. led a new expedition into Central Minnesota. The group split into smaller parties, and one led by Cadotte's brother Michel Cadotte journeyed up the Crow Wing River. As winter set in they established their post on the bank, while another party pressed on and established Réaume's Trading Post on the Leaf River. Cadotte's post consisted of log huts surrounded by a palisade. He was an effective trader who forged a positive relationship with the Dakota, thus opening this region to the fur trade.

Vestiges of Cadotte's post were first documented in 1868, though the six visible depressions were assumed to be rifle pits. In 1972 the site received a modern archaeological field survey in an area measuring 160 by 130 feet (49 by 40 m). This survey noted seven depressions: four rectangular (the largest being 30 by 15 feet (9.1 m × 4.6 m)), two circular, and one irregular in shape. The surveyors could also discern an eroded path dropping 25 feet (7.6 m) down to the river.

== Prescott's Trading Post ==
Three decades later, in 1825, Philander Prescott led another fur trading party into the area. That year the First Treaty of Prairie du Chien had specified a border between Ojibwe and Dakota territory. However Prescott and his party initially established their camp on Leaf Lake, right in the contested zone. Hostilities with the Dakota left two Ojibwe members of the party dead, prompting the survivors to retreat to the mouth of the Leaf River where they were firmly within Ojibwe territory.

The trading post consisted of a house for Prescott, a storehouse, and a lodge for the rest of the men. It was a severe winter that brought starvation to many in the area, but the trading was lucrative and in spring Prescott returned to Fort Snelling with thirty packs of furs. Meanwhile, the Ojibwe members continued on to Leech Lake for the annual maple sugar harvest.

At the time of the district's nomination to the National Register in 1973, the exact location of this post had not been rediscovered.

== Old Wadena ==
In the mid-19th century the Red River Trails were forged between Minneapolis–Saint Paul and the Red River Colony in present-day Manitoba. A route blazed in 1844, known as the Woods Trail, forded the Crow Wing River between the mouths of the Partridge and Leaf Rivers. In the 1850s the U.S. government began improving the Woods Trail but ultimately only progressed as far as the Crow Wing crossing.

At this crossing in 1856, a land speculator named Augustus Aspinwall platted a townsite which he named Wadena. He established a trading post, a post office, and a ferry, and it became a regular stop for travelers on the Woods Trail. Wadena was named county seat and Aspinwall anticipated a flood of settlers as soon as railroad track could be built through the area. However the Panic of 1857 suppressed railroad construction for years, and when the Northern Pacific Railway finally laid track through the area in 1871 they chose a route 3.5 miles (5.6 km) to the south. What little population had collected in Aspinwall's town abandoned the site and established a new town of Wadena along the railway.

Around this time, though, Peter and Angeline Roy established Wadena County's first farm in the vicinity of what soon became known as Old Wadena. They cultivated fields and kept dairy cattle.

== See also ==
- National Register of Historic Places listings in Wadena County, Minnesota
