= Wing River =

Wing River may refer to:

- Wing River (Leaf River tributary), in Minnesota, United States
- Wing River (Rapid River tributary), in Minnesota, United States
- Wing River Township, Wadena County, Minnesota, United States
