= Hewitt Public School =

Local history museum in Hewitt, Minnesota

- U.S. National Register of Historic Places
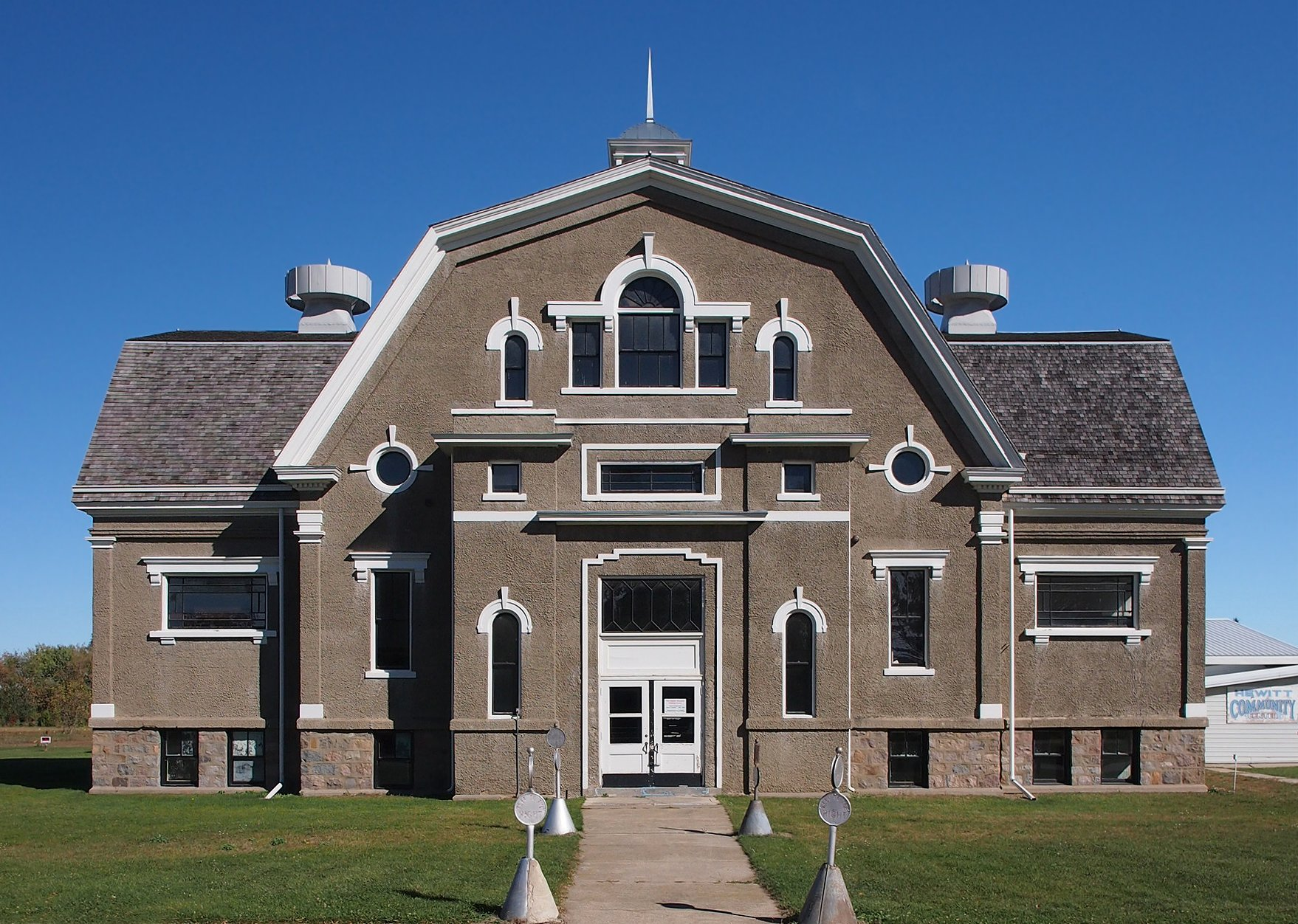
- The Hewitt Public School from the west-southwest

- Location within Minnesota Location within the United States
- Location: 514 N. Wisconsin Street, Hewitt, Minnesota
- Coordinates: 46°19′39.5″N 95°5′2.5″W
- Area: 2.5 acres (1.0 ha)
- Built: 1911
- Built by: Medson Brothers
- Architect: C. Howard Parsons
- Architectural style: Colonial Revival
- NRHP reference No.: 06001181
- Designated: December 27, 2006

Hewitt Public School Museum
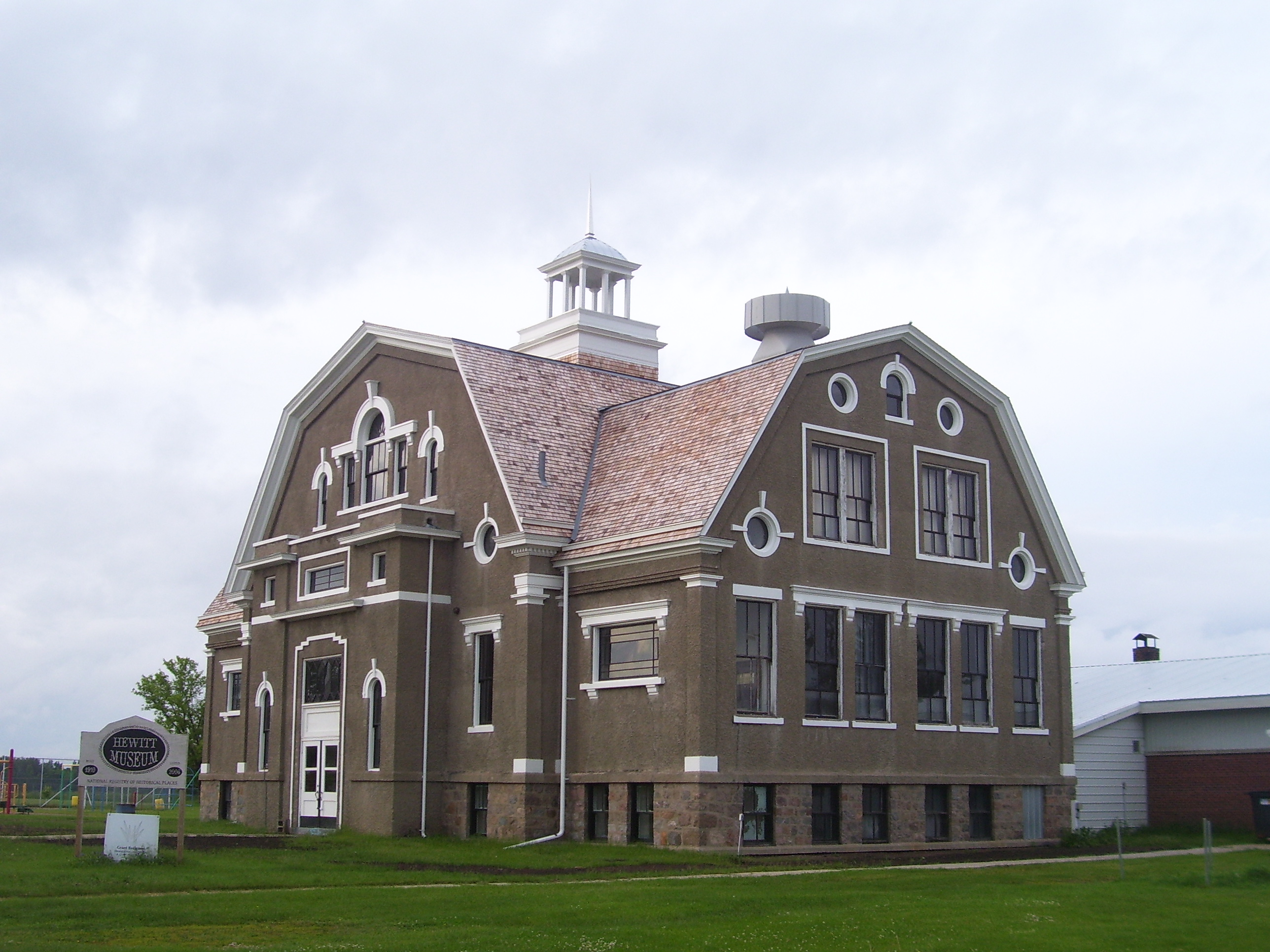
- Southwest view
- Location: 514 Wisconsin Street, Hewitt, Minnesota 56453, United States
- Type: Local history
- Website: hewitthistoricalsociety.weebly.com

Hewitt Public School is a former school building in Hewitt, Minnesota, United States, active 1911 to 1979. It was Hewitt's only educational institution up to 1952, hosting first grade through high school at its peak. It was also a key venue for community events, public health services, and extracurricular agricultural instruction. The building was listed on the National Register of Historic Places in 2006 for having local significance in the theme of education. It was nominated for its central role in educating and socializing not only Hewitt's children but its adult population as well.

Beginning in 1981 the Hewitt Historical Society has developed the former school into the Hewitt Museum & Library. It interprets the history and culture of Hewitt and the surrounding Stowe Prairie Township.

== Description ==
Hewitt Public School is a cruciform building rising two and a half stories. Its dominant visual feature is a cross-gambrel roof, which rises to 42 feet (13 m) on the shorter ridgeline and 36 feet (11 m) on the longer. The walls are poured concrete covered with stucco, on a foundation of granite ashlars.

The main façade is symmetrical and complexly fenestrated. Narrow arched windows flank the main entrance and a Palladian window is centered on the attic level. The rectangular windows feature elaborate hood moulds while the arched and round windows feature elongated keystone moulds. The central section projecting toward the street has corner pilasters topped by elaborate cornices.

The front entrance leads into a 12-foot-high (3.7 m) foyer, which has a staircase on either side leading up to the second floor. There are three classrooms on the first floor. The second floor consists of two classrooms on the left, an auditorium in the middle, and three small rooms on the right that served as a superintendent's office, library, and supply room. The basement level contained classrooms for art and chemistry, the cafeteria, restrooms, and a boiler room.

A one-story addition is attached to the southeast corner of the school. It contains a gymnasium, a kitchen, a meeting room, and restrooms. The gymnasium was built in 1952 and the rest added in 1980.

== Background and construction ==
The town of Hewitt was platted in 1891 and opened its first school the following year. By the end of the first decade of the 20th century the original building was getting cramped, due more to state initiatives that improved attendance by farm children than any major population growth. At this time state and national education officials were also pushing for consolidation of schools, doing away with the one-room schoolhouses that peppered the countryside. In 1911 a new state law offered grants for construction and operation of larger schools centrally located in towns. Officials from Hewitt's school district convinced the surrounding rural districts to consolidate with them.

The school board hired architect C. Howard Parsons of Minneapolis, who had designed schools in nearby Long Prairie, Wadena, Sauk Centre, and Little Falls. Parsons and the local building committee decided to construct the new school entirely out of concrete. This was a fairly novel building material at the time, garnering widespread praise as durable, fireproof, and modern. Construction began in May 1911 with local laborers under the supervision of Minneapolis-based contractor Medson Brothers. They used a pulley and a horse to raise buckets of cement to cast the two-story walls.

== Use ==
=== Education ===
The consolidated Hewitt Public School opened in the fall of 1911, originally housing grades one through eight plus one year of high school. Upgrades to the heating, plumbing, ventilation, and electrical systems in the 1920s allowed the district to offer two more years of high school. Government funds for these improvements also mandated better library facilities, lighting, science equipment, administration, and record keeping. With these reforms in place, intended to increase student performance on state exams, Hewitt Public School was promoted to a full four-year high school in 1931.

=== Public health ===
Hewitt Public School served as the base of operations in Hewitt and the surrounding Stowe Prairie Township for public health efforts, a growing national focus after World War I and the 1918 flu pandemic. A public health nurse sponsored by the Red Cross worked out of the school beginning in 1920, providing childhood health screenings, vaccinations, and classes for local women on nutrition, cooking, and first aid. In this period the sick were usually cared for at home by family members rather than being hospitalized, so the nurse also provided education to caregivers and housecalls to local tuberculosis patients.

=== Agricultural instruction ===
The Smith–Lever Act of 1914 provided government funding for agricultural and home economics instruction, and once again Hewitt Public School was the main local venue for these programs. Offered by the state's cooperative extension service, they helped introduce agricultural communities to the latest and most effective methods of raising crops and livestock. One popular program was the school garden, which students helped plan, plant, tend, harvest, and preserve (the canned produce then being used in school lunches throughout the year).

During World War II, agricultural extension services were a key tool for the national and state government to try to boost farm production and address wartime shortages. These programs helped recruit additional farm labor, collect scrap metal, share fertilizer and machinery, and encourage children to buy war savings stamps. They held classes on cooking with local produce and substituting for unavailable foods. Meanwhile, the school's faculty took charge of local sugar rationing.

=== Community venue ===
Like all public schools at the time, the Hewitt building was also intended to serve as a community center. The auditorium hosted plays, concerts, and lectures. Community groups, many led by the school's own teachers, met in the classrooms after hours. Demand for space was high enough that the school board instituted a rental fee in 1922, though organizations open to the public (such as the Boy Scouts) were exempted.

== Closure and reuse ==
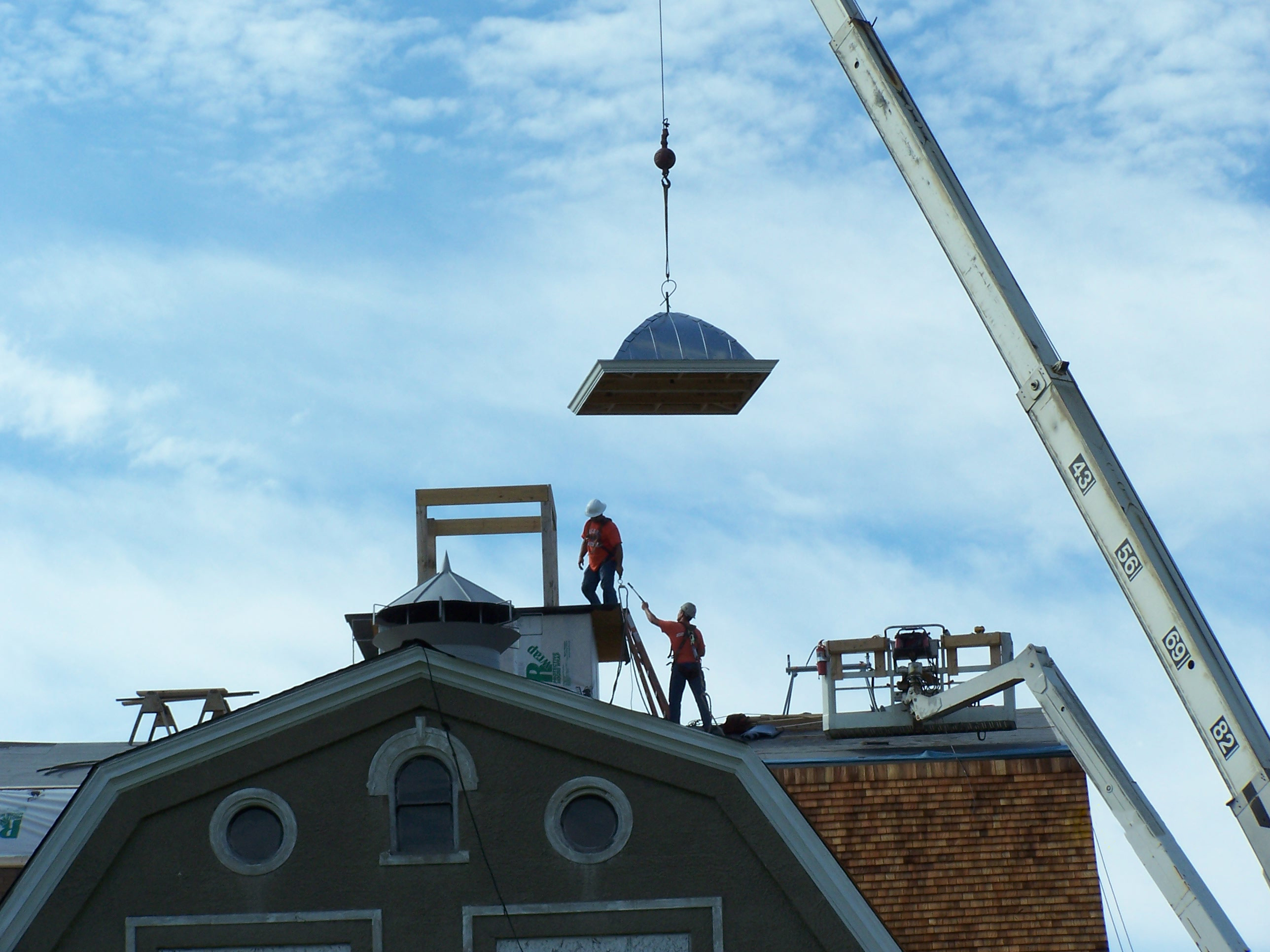
Tower reconstruction

Graduating classes from the high school were never large, hitting a maximum of 16 in 1943. In 1946 only four students graduated. The declining enrollment led the school board to approve closing the high school in 1948, but community members successfully lobbied to keep it open. Despite the local support and the addition of a gymnasium in 1952, the school's superintendent stated that "there will soon be too few pupils left to operate even a grade school in Hewitt." The Minnesota State Board of Education, pushing for consolidation with nearby Bertha, finally broke through the opposition by promising that the grade school would remain in Hewitt. Beginning in 1953 the older students began attending classes in Bertha, while grades one through six continued meeting at Hewitt Public School. In 1964, however, that was dropped to just fifth and sixth grades, and the school closed permanently in December 1979.

The building and its grounds were sold to the city of Hewitt for one dollar. The Hewitt Lions Club was granted a 99-year lease on the gymnasium for use as a community center, adding a meeting room and kitchen to that wing in 1980. The following year the Hewitt Historical Society organized and began using the main section as a museum. Outside, half of the former schoolyard has been developed as a public park.

In 2010 the building's roof and windows were restored with a grant from the Minnesota Historical Society funded by the 2008 Clean Water, Land, and Legacy Amendment. With books donated by the school library of Eagle Bend, the historical society opened a lending library in one of the former classrooms in 2011. The society aims to offer internet access as well to help make up for the lack of a public library in Hewitt.

== Hewitt Public School Museum ==
The Hewitt Public School Museum exists to preserve and promote the history of the City of Hewitt and Stowe Prairie Township and operates as a component of the Hewitt Historical Society. The museum also maintains a lending library within the building.

== Gallery ==
Images of the Hewitt Public School Museum

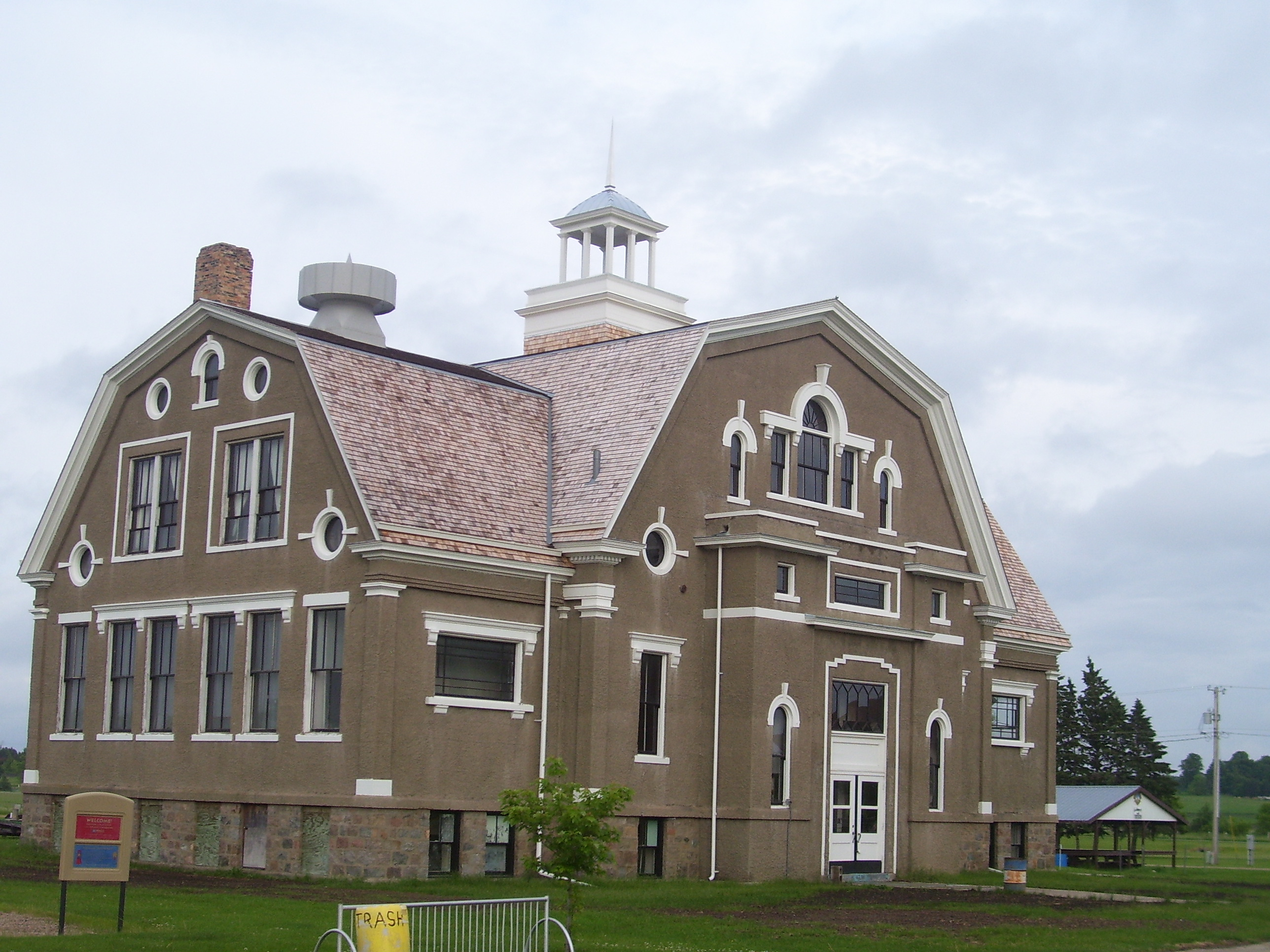
Northwest view

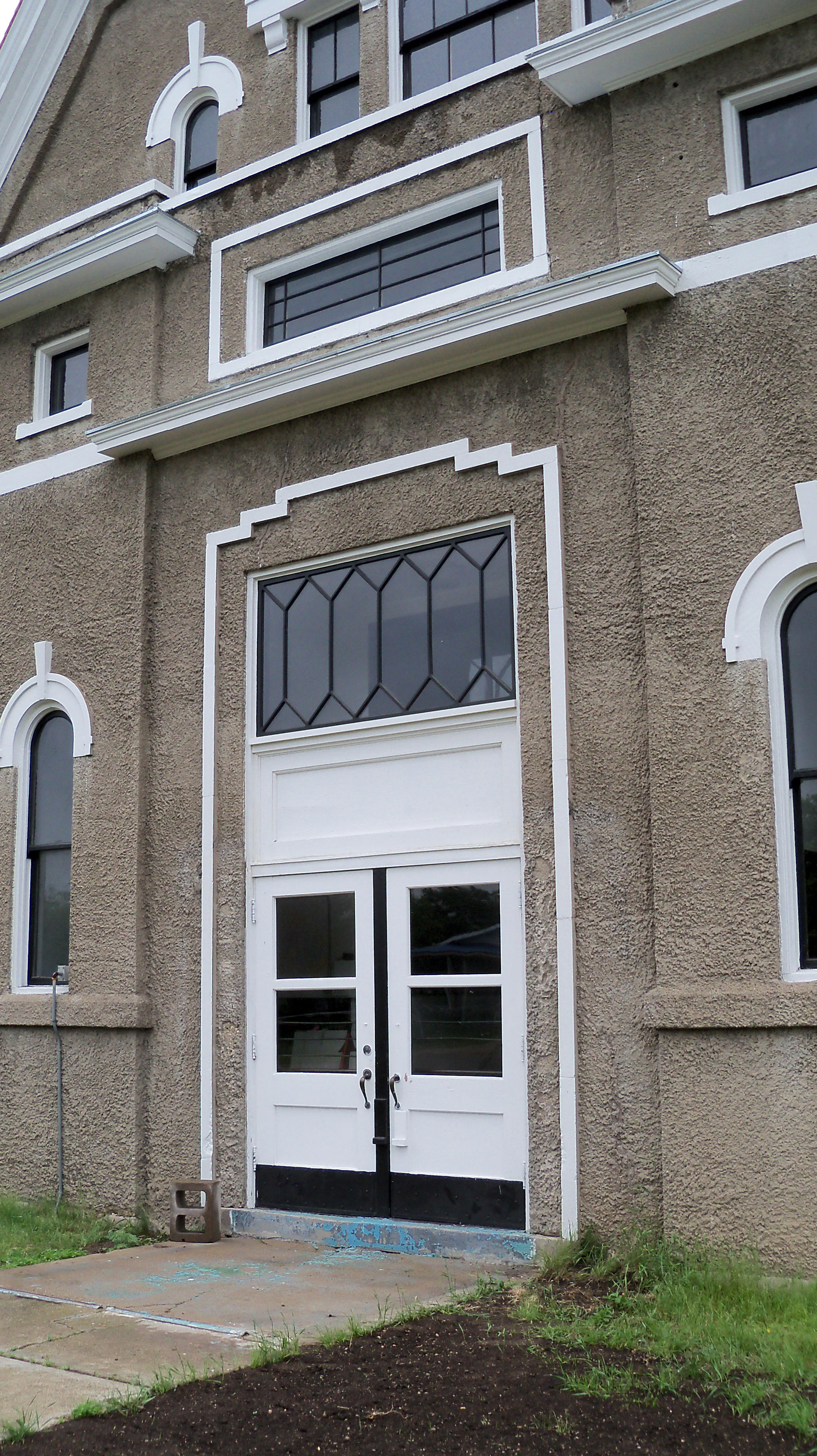
Front door

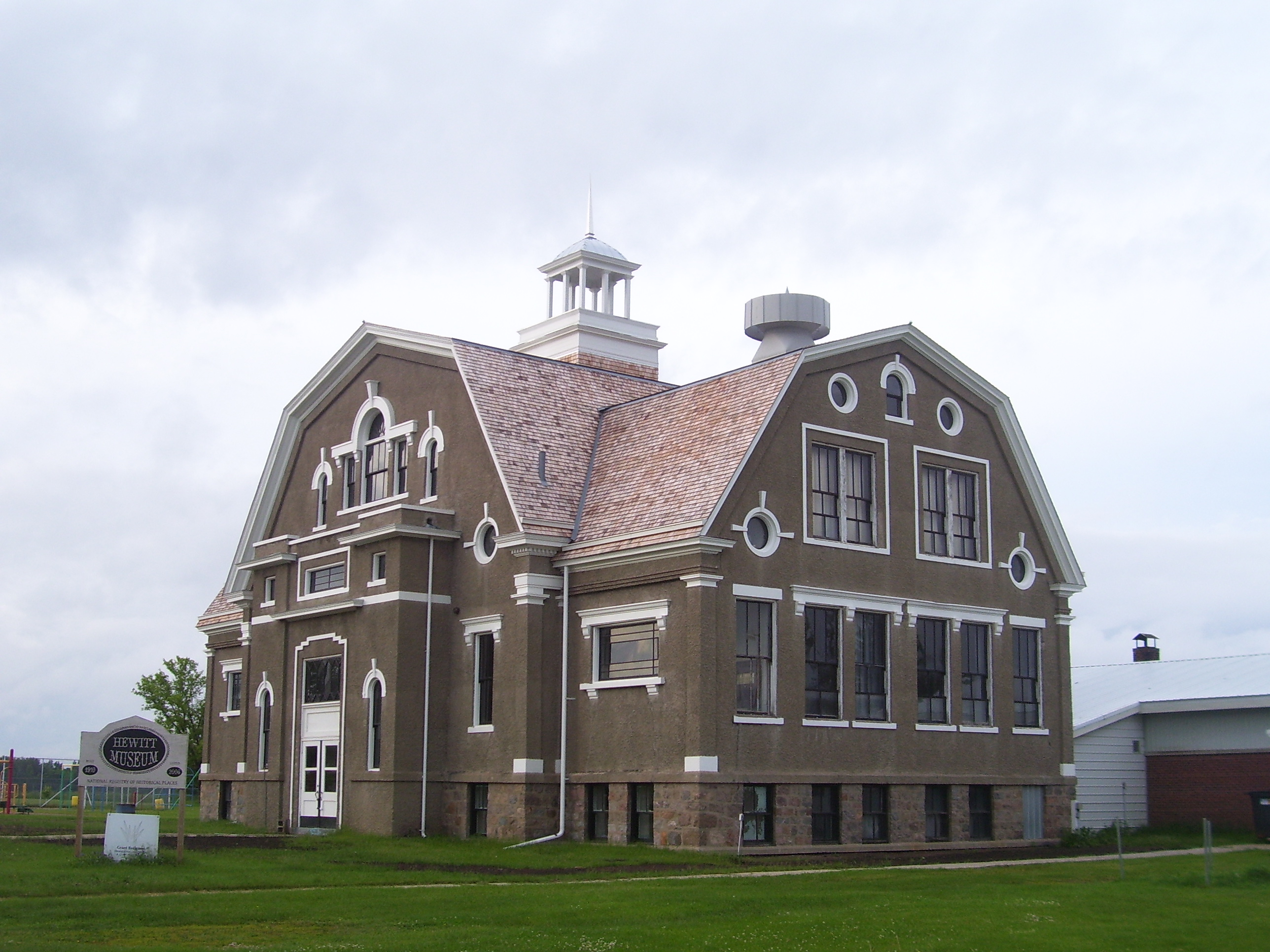
Southwest

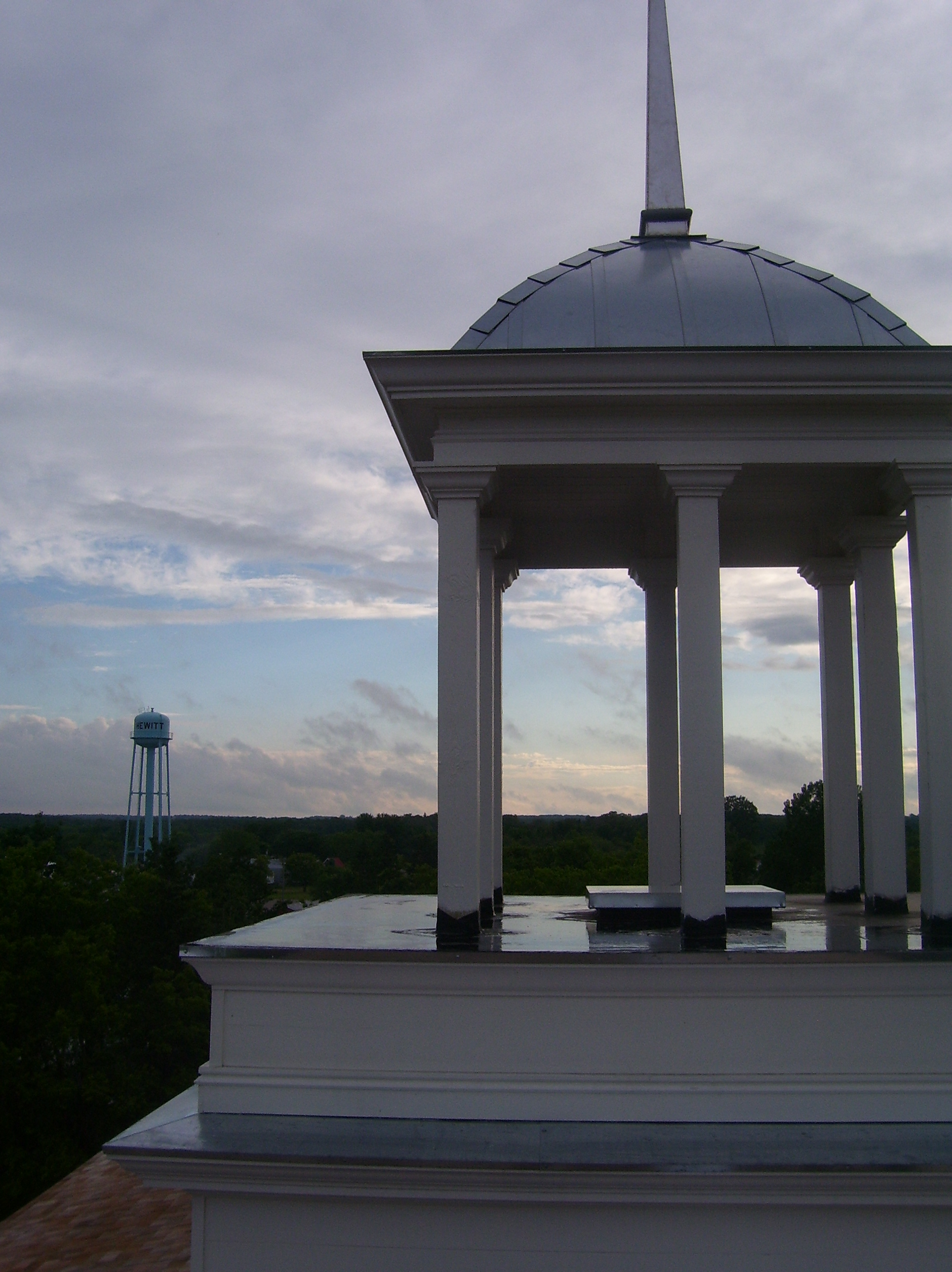
Tower

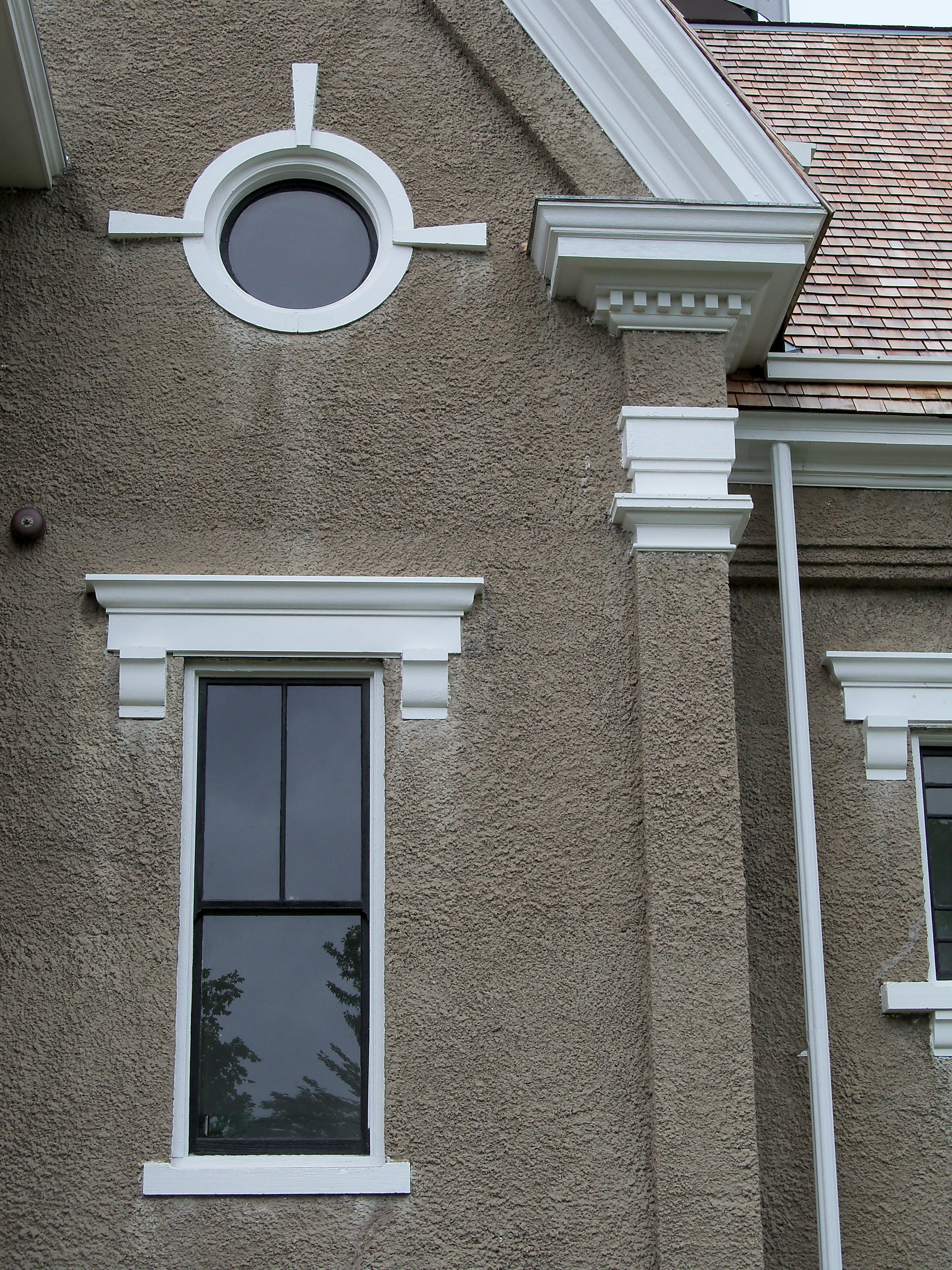
West side window

== See also ==
- List of museums in Minnesota
- National Register of Historic Places listings in Todd County, Minnesota
