= Leaf River, Minnesota =

Ghost town in Minnesota, United States

Coordinates: 46°29′19″N 95°04′54″W

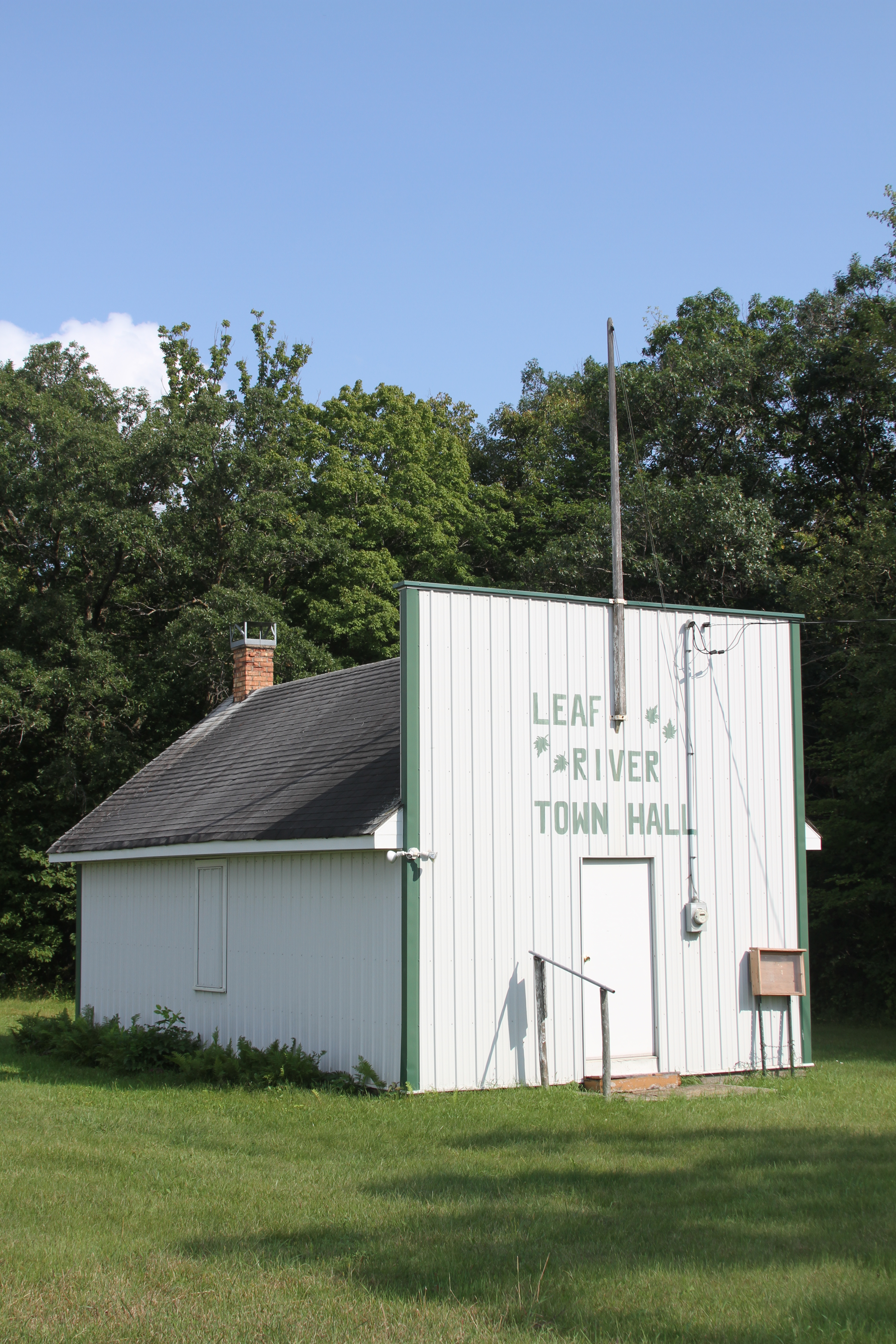
The Leaf River Town Hall in 2024

Leaf River, or Leafriver, is a ghost town in section 22 of Leaf River Township, Wadena County, Minnesota, United States. Today the town has a population around 50. There is a restaurant, a golf course, an old school house and a residential community.

== History ==
The village of Leaf River had a post office from 1880 until 1882, and again from 1902 until 1908. It was served by a station of the Great Northern Railway.

== Etymology ==
The village received its name from the Leaf River, which was in turn named for the Leaf Mountains, which were called by the Ojibwa Gaaskibag-wajiwan. This name was translated by Gilfillan as "Rustling Leaf Mountains."
