= Partridge River (Crow Wing River tributary) =

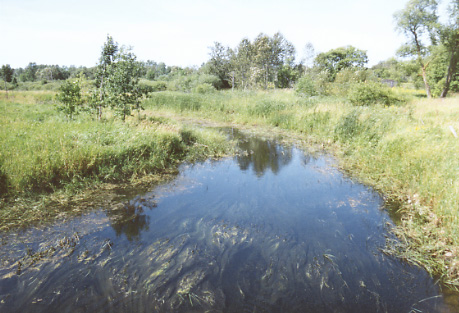
- The Partridge River in Bartlett Township of Todd County in 2004

- Mouth of the Partridge River

Location
- Country: United States
- State: Minnesota
- Counties: Wadena, Todd

Physical characteristics
- Source
  - location: Bertha Township
  - coordinates: 46.2060742°N 95.0469714°W
- Mouth
  - location: Thomastown Township
  - coordinates: 46°25′11″N 94°49′36″W
- Length: 32.6 mi-long (52.5 km)

Basin features
- River system: Crow Wing River

The Partridge River and its tributary the Little Partridge River are small rivers in rural west-central Minnesota in the United States. The Partridge is a 32.6-mile-long (52.5 km) tributary of the Crow Wing River, via which it is part of the Mississippi River watershed.

== Course ==
The Partridge River rises in Bertha Township north of the town of Eagle Bend on The Harren Farm in northwestern Todd County and flows generally northeastwardly into southeastern Wadena County, past the town of Aldrich. It joins the Crow Wing River in Thomastown Township, about 9 miles (14 km) north-northwest of the town of Staples and about 1 mile (2 km) downstream of the mouth of the Leaf River.

Its largest tributary is the Little Partridge River, which rises west of Eagle Bend in Wykeham Township in Todd County and flows 21.1 miles (33.9 km) northeastwardly, parallel to the uppermost stretch of the Partridge River, which it joins in Bartlett Township.

== See also ==
- List of rivers of Minnesota
