= Bluffton, Minnesota =

City in Minnesota, United States

- City
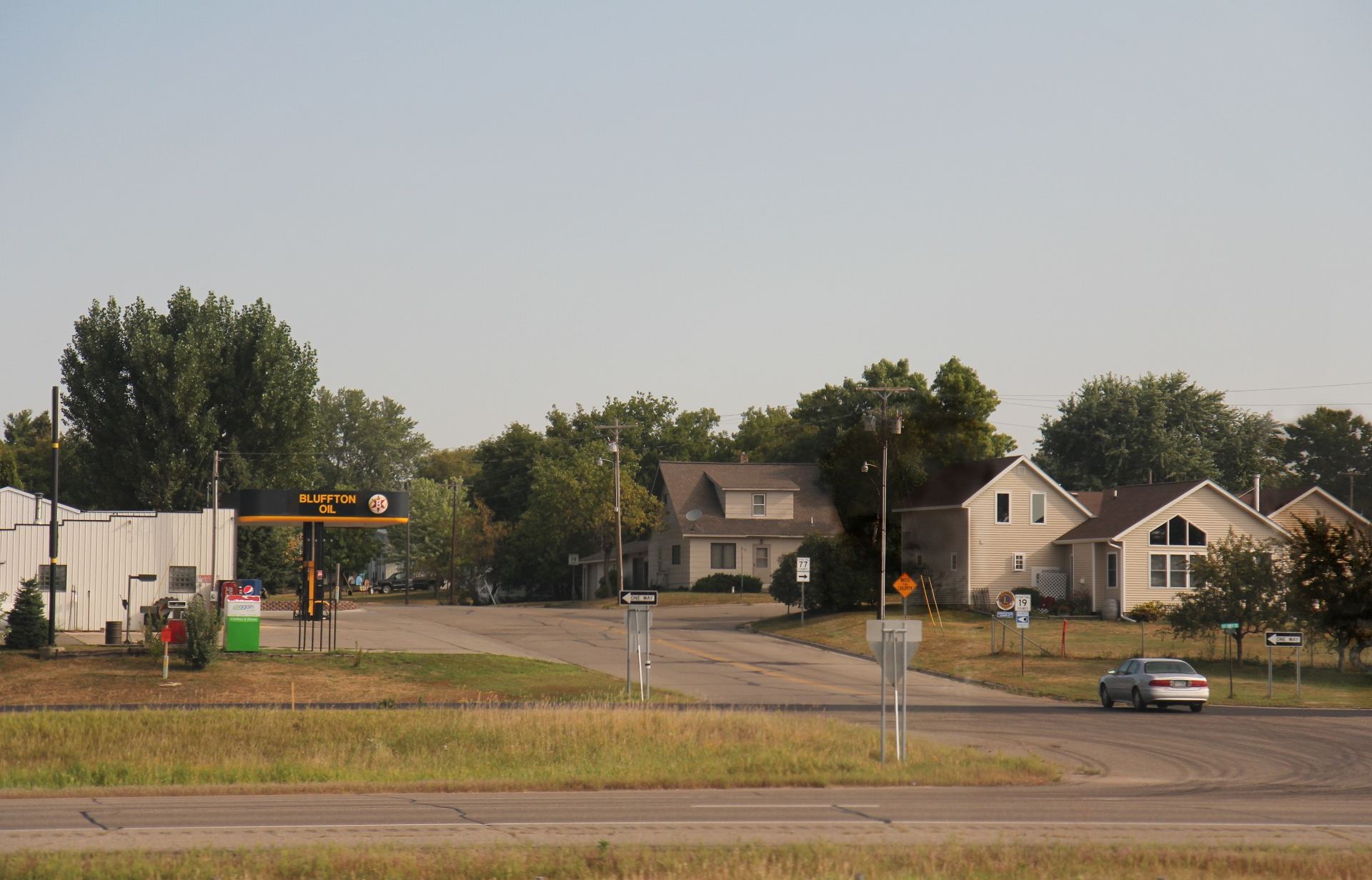
- Downtown Bluffton

- Location of Bluffton, Minnesota
- Coordinates: 46°28′11″N 95°14′02″W
- Country: United States
- State: Minnesota
- County: Otter Tail
- Founded: March 1880
- Incorporated: February 26, 1903

Government
  - Mayor: Tim Pavek

Area
  - Total: 2.756 sq mi (7.138 km^{2})
  - Land: 2.735 sq mi (7.083 km^{2})
  - Water: 0.021 sq mi (0.055 km^{2})
- Elevation: 1,362 ft (415 m)

Population (2020)
  - Total: 210
  - Estimate (2022): 213
  - Density: 76.8/sq mi (29.65/km^{2})
- Time zone: UTC−6 (Central (CST))
  - Summer (DST): UTC−5 (CDT)
- ZIP Code: 56518
- Area code: 218
- FIPS code: 27-06778
- GNIS feature ID: 2394210
- Sales tax: 7.375%

Bluffton is a city in Otter Tail County, Minnesota, United States, along the Leaf River. The population was 210 at the 2020 census.

== History ==
Bluffton was platted in March 1880, and named for the bluffs on the nearby Leaf River. Bluffton was incorporated on February 26, 1903.

== Geography ==
According to the United States Census Bureau, the city has a total area of 2.756 square miles (7.14 km^{2}), of which 2.735 square miles (7.08 km^{2}) is land and 0.021 square miles (0.05 km^{2}) is water.

U.S. Route 10 serves as a main route in the community.

== Demographics ==
Historical population
| Census | Pop. | Note | %± |
|---|---|---|---|
| 1880 | 69 | | — |
| 1910 | 148 | | — |
| 1920 | 220 | | 48.6% |
| 1930 | 204 | | −7.3% |
| 1940 | 234 | | 14.7% |
| 1950 | 239 | | 2.1% |
| 1960 | 211 | | −11.7% |
| 1970 | 195 | | −7.6% |
| 1980 | 206 | | 5.6% |
| 1990 | 187 | | −9.2% |
| 2000 | 210 | | 12.3% |
| 2010 | 207 | | −1.4% |
| 2020 | 210 | | 1.4% |
| 2022 (est.) | 213 | | 1.4% |
U.S. Decennial Census; 2020 Census

=== 2010 census ===
As of the 2010 census, there were 207 people, 79 households, and 54 families living in the city. The population density was 75.0 inhabitants per square mile (29.0/km^{2}). There were 83 housing units at an average density of 30.1 per square mile (11.6/km^{2}). The racial makeup of the city was 96.1% White, 0.5% Native American, 0.5% Asian, 0.5% from other races, and 2.4% from two or more races. Hispanic or Latino of any race were 1.4% of the population.

There were 79 households, of which 32.9% had children under the age of 18 living with them, 58.2% were married couples living together, 3.8% had a female householder with no husband present, 6.3% had a male householder with no wife present, and 31.6% were non-families. 27.8% of all households were made up of individuals, and 15.2% had someone living alone who was 65 years of age or older. The average household size was 2.62 and the average family size was 3.20.

The median age in the city was 33.9 years. 25.6% of residents were under the age of 18; 10.2% were between the ages of 18 and 24; 24.2% were from 25 to 44; 24.1% were from 45 to 64; and 15.9% were 65 years of age or older. The gender makeup of the city was 48.3% male and 51.7% female.

=== 2000 census ===
As of the 2000 census, there were 210 people, 76 households, and 56 families living in the city. The population density was 75.8 inhabitants per square mile (29.3/km^{2}). There were 77 housing units at an average density of 27.8 per square mile (10.7/km^{2}). The racial makeup of the city was 99.05% White, and 0.95% from two or more races.

There were 76 households, out of which 46.1% had children under the age of 18 living with them, 65.8% were married couples living together, 5.3% had a female householder with no husband present, and 26.3% were non-families. 26.3% of all households were made up of individuals, and 13.2% had someone living alone who was 65 years of age or older. The average household size was 2.68 and the average family size was 3.27.

In the city, the population was spread out, with 33.3% under the age of 18, 3.3% from 18 to 24, 31.0% from 25 to 44, 14.3% from 45 to 64, and 18.1% who were 65 years of age or older. The median age was 34 years. For every 100 females, there were 89.2 males. For every 100 females age 18 and over, there were 94.4 males.

The median income for a household in the city was $31,250, and the median income for a family was $33,958. Males had a median income of $28,125 versus $17,000 for females. The per capita income for the city was $12,105. About 6.6% of families and 8.6% of the population were below the poverty line, including 11.1% of those under the age of eighteen and none of those 65 or over.

== Transportation ==
Amtrak’s Empire Builder, which operates between Seattle/Portland and Chicago, passes through the town on BNSF tracks, but makes no stop. The nearest station is located in Staples, 23 miles (37 km) to the southeast.
