= Thomastown Township, Wadena County, Minnesota =

Thomastown Township, Minnesota
- Township
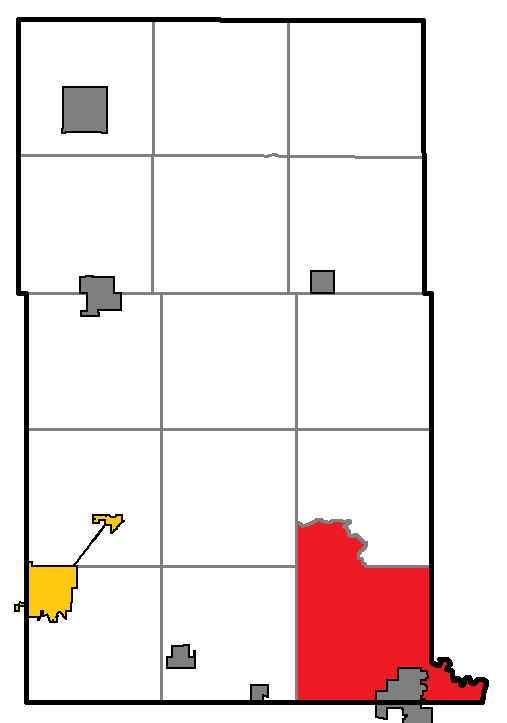
- Location of Thomastown Township, within Wadena County, Minnesota
- Coordinates: 46°24′58″N 94°50′10″W
- Country: United States
- State: Minnesota
- County: Wadena

Area
  - Total: 42.0 sq mi (108.7 km^{2})
  - Land: 41.0 sq mi (106.1 km^{2})
  - Water: 1.0 sq mi (2.6 km^{2})
- Elevation: 1,302 ft (397 m)

Population (2020)
  - Total: 824
  - Density: 20.1/sq mi (7.77/km^{2})
- Time zone: UTC-6 (Central (CST))
  - Summer (DST): UTC-5 (CDT)
- ZIP code: 56481
- Area code: 218
- FIPS code: 27-64624
- GNIS feature ID: 0665781

Thomastown Township is a township in Wadena County, Minnesota, United States. The population was 824 at the 2020 census.

Thomastown Township was named for Thomas Scott, an early settler.

== Geography ==
According to the United States Census Bureau, the township has a total area of 42.0 square miles (108.7 km^{2}); 41.0 square miles (106.1 km^{2}) of it is land and 1.0 square miles (2.6 km^{2}) of it (2.41%) is water.

The Crow Wing River is joined by its tributaries the Leaf and Partridge Rivers in the township. One property within the township, the Old Wadena Historic District, is listed on the National Register of Historic Places.

== Demographics ==
As of the census of 2000, there were 714 people, 251 households, and 211 families residing in the township. The population density was 17.4 people per square mile (6.7/km^{2}). There were 311 housing units at an average density of 7.6/sq mi (2.9/km^{2}). The racial makeup of the township was 98.60% White, 0.14% Native American, 0.28% Asian, 0.28% from other races, and 0.70% from two or more races. Hispanic or Latino of any race were 0.98% of the population.

There were 251 households, out of which 34.3% had children under the age of 18 living with them, 78.5% were married couples living together, 0.8% had a female householder with no husband present, and 15.9% were non-families. 13.1% of all households were made up of individuals, and 6.4% had someone living alone who was 65 years of age or older. The average household size was 2.84 and the average family size was 3.08.

In the township the population was spread out, with 28.2% under the age of 18, 6.4% from 18 to 24, 24.8% from 25 to 44, 29.0% from 45 to 64, and 11.6% who were 65 years of age or older. The median age was 40 years. For every 100 females, there were 101.7 males. For every 100 females age 18 and over, there were 106.0 males.

The median income for a household in the township was $48,000, and the median income for a family was $50,417. Males had a median income of $31,944 versus $20,804 for females. The per capita income for the township was $20,017. About 7.1% of families and 9.5% of the population were below the poverty line, including 11.3% of those under age 18 and 6.9% of those age 65 or over.
