= Réaume's Trading Post =

- Reaume's Trading Post
- U.S. National Register of Historic Places
- Location: Address restricted, Wing River Township, Minnesota
- Built: 1792
- NRHP reference No.: 74001042
- Designated: December 24, 1974

Réaume's Trading Post (Smithsonian trinomial 21WD15) was a trading post established on the Leaf River in 1792 in what is now Wing River Township, Minnesota, United States. No visible traces remain at the site, which is on private property, but archaeological investigations have identified several features. It was listed on the National Register of Historic Places in 1974 for having state-level significance in the themes of commerce and historical archaeology. It was nominated for its role in and research potential on the opening of the fur trade in north-central Minnesota.

== Establishment ==
Joseph Réaume was trading among the Ojibwe on Red Lake as early as 1785. Around 1789 he joined with John Sayer, Jean Baptiste Cadotte, Jr., and Gabriel Attina dit Laviolette to trade in the Mississippi headwaters region. In 1792 he accompanied Cadotte on an expedition down the Mississippi River into central Minnesota, which was then a hunting territory of the Dakota people. When Cadotte stopped to build a trading post on the Crow Wing River, Réaume continued upstream to the Leaf River where he established his own post. Both posts were on an established water route between Lake Superior and the Red River of the North. Réaume's post was abandoned at an unknown date and later burned to the ground.

Réaume himself must not have spent long at the post, because he is recorded working on the Assiniboine River after 1794. In 1797 he joined the North West Company, serving as a clerk and interpreter. In the 1802–1804 diary of fur trader George Nelson, Réaume is referred to as "a respectable old gentleman" in charge of the Folle Avoine region and trading on the Snake River.

== Excavation ==
Surveys in 1869 and 1901 first noted ditches, two diamond-shaped depressions, and piles of rock at the site, but these were presumed to be traces of a Native American fortification. It wasn't until 1972 that further surveys, correlated with historical narratives, suggested the site was that of Réaume's trading post. Those efforts identified a stockade comprising two angled palisades, a ditch, and possibly a blockhouse. Within the stockade were depressions indicating the presence of buildings, and piles of rock suggesting collapsed chimneys. On the riverbank were two canoe landing sites. The few artifacts recovered at the time included some bone fragments and a nail.

Archaeologist Amelie Allard of the University of Minnesota began conducting new studies of the site in 2011. Its exact location remains undisclosed as part of the agreement with the property owner.

== See also ==
- National Register of Historic Places listings in Wadena County, Minnesota
