= Leaf River (Illinois) =

River in Illinois, United States

Physical characteristics
- Source
  - location: Carroll County southeast of Shannon, Illinois
  - coordinates: 42°07′46″N 89°41′59″W
- Mouth
  - location: Confluence with the Rock River north of Oregon, Illinois
  - coordinates: 42°05′50″N 89°19′20″W
  - elevation: 676 ft (206 m)
- Length: 31 mi (50 km)

Basin features
- Progression: Leaf River → Rock → Mississippi → Gulf of Mexico
- GNIS ID: 411890

The Leaf River is a tributary of the Rock River, about 31 miles (50 km) long, in northwestern Illinois in the United States. Via the Rock, it is part of the Mississippi River watershed.

== Course ==
After rising east of the town of Shannon in northeastern Carroll County, the Leaf flows eastward across northwestern Ogle County, past the towns of Adeline and Leaf River. It joins the Rock River from the west between the towns of Byron and Oregon.

== See also ==
- List of Illinois rivers
- Other streams and places named Leaf River
