= Camp Kupugani =

Summer camp in Illinois, United States

Coordinates: 42°08′49″N 89°28′11″W

Camp Kupugani is a multicultural summer camp for young women and young men, in girls-only and blended sessions, with an emphasis on teaching them to recognize and eliminate stereotypes. "Kupugani" is a Zulu concept that means "To raise oneself up" It is located near Adeline, Illinois, and is the only private, residential summer camp facility in the United States under black ownership. It is also an American Camp Association member.

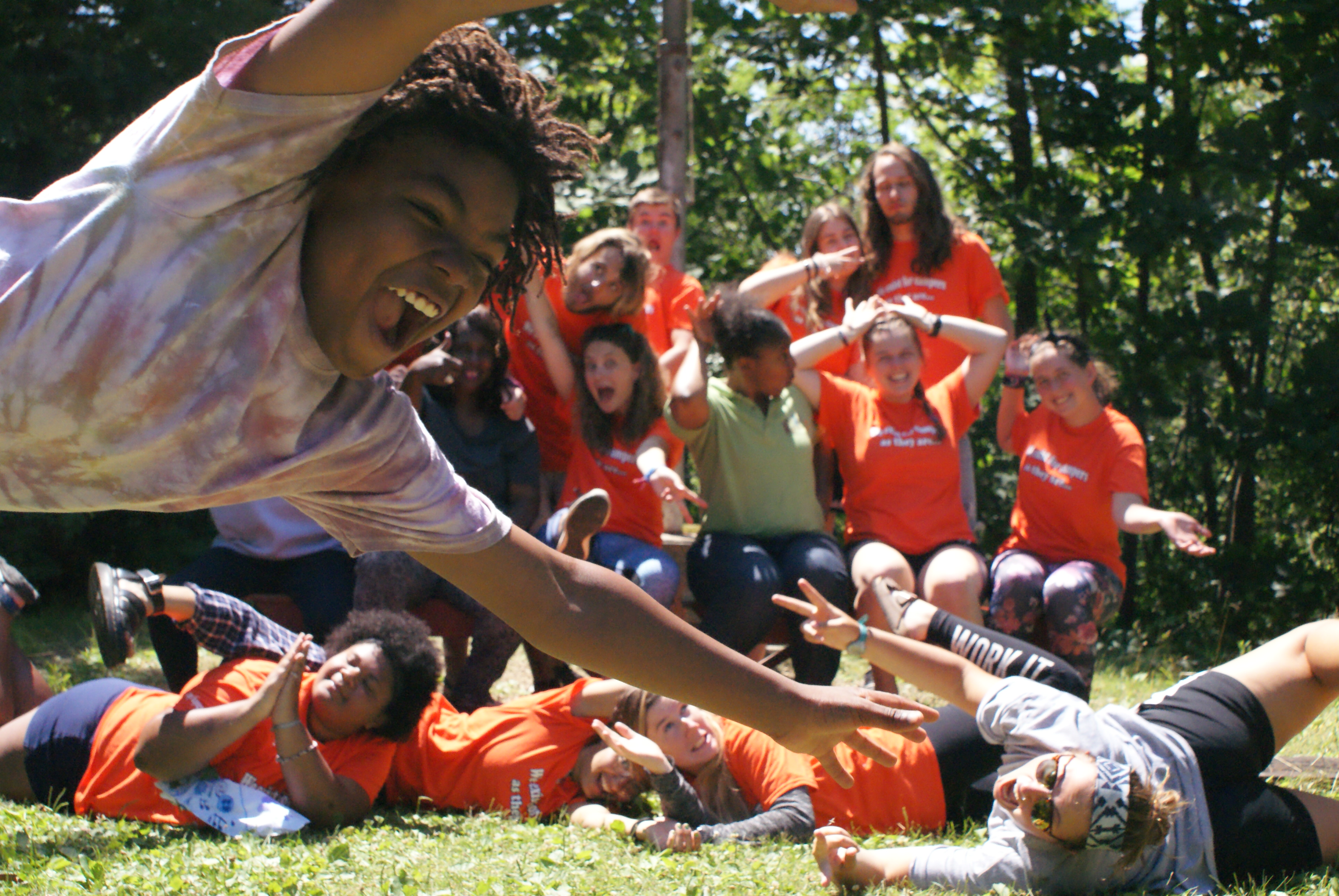
Happy Camper Photobomb

== History ==
The camp land history of Camp Kupugani dates back to the 1800s. In April 1951, the Board of Directors for the 4-H Camp of Northwestern Illinois purchased an original parcel of 110 acres of Midwest timberland along the Leaf River from brothers Ben and Deed Sjoberg. Later donations brought the site to its present 126 acres. The camp was named White Eagle, in honor of the old White Eagle Mill. Built in 1837 and located on what is now camp property, today’s campgrounds contain remnants of the location's history, with the old mill forming the base of the dining hall fireplace.

== Owner ==
The camp's owner and director is Kevin Gordon, the Canadian-born son of Jamaican immigrants. He has a degree in psychology from Harvard University and a law degree from the University of California, Berkeley. After college graduation, he continued working as an assistant camp director, traveled through Europe shortly after the fall of the Berlin Wall, traveled throughout Africa, and wrote a book chronicling his African adventures (titled Not Yet African). He has been involved with camping since 1990; before coming to Kupugani, he worked at camps in Wisconsin, Pennsylvania, and California. His wife Natasha Jackson is the food service manager.

== Mission ==
Kupugani's mission operates based on six core values:

- Excellence ("Do your best")
- Empowerment ("Be your best")
- Community ("Show your best")
- Fun
- Safety
- Environment

In addition, an important feature of the camp's philosophy is its multicultural education program, designed to allow children from varied cultures and backgrounds to form a cohesive community while having fun, being empowered, and learning critical social skills. In addition to traditional camp activities such as hiking, water activities, and sports, campers participate in team activities which focus on team-building and accessing different cultures as well as self-expression and self-esteem. Like most summer camps, it is "tech-free", with campers not allowed to use cell phones, computers, or iPods. Kupugani has been widely recognized in the media, including features in Ebony Magazine, on the Tavis Smiley Radio program, and on WCPT Chicago radio, as well as articles in "Afrique" and "Insight News".

== Program ==
Camp Kupugani serves children age 7 to 15. It offers a 2-week girls only session, and 2- and 4-week "blended" sessions for all genders. The camp also offers a mother-daughter weekend and a parent-child weekend experience. It was founded as a girls' camp; sessions for boys were added in 2009, and the blended session piloted in 2016.

== Activities ==
Camp Kupugani offers a variety of land, water, and adventure activities including:

- Rock Climbing
- Horse Riding
- Swimming
- Basketball
- Tennis
- Pickleball
- Spikeball
- River Walks
- Dam Jumping
- Lake Play
- Paddle Boarding
- GaGa
- Crate Stacking
- 9 Square In The Air
- Slacklining
- Frisbee Golf
- Hiking
- Challenge Hikes
- Night Hikes
- Mud Volleyball
- Sand Volleyball
- Arts and Crafts
- Canoeing
- Biking
- Ecology and Nature
- Soccer
- Archery
- Fishing

== Membership ==
The camp draws its population from a wide range of children. In addition to campers from as far as Japan, Spain, and England, others have joined them from California, Texas, New Mexico, Louisiana, Georgia, and Wisconsin, in addition to children from the camp's region of Northwest Illinois. The campers' ethnic backgrounds are a mix: including Caucasian, Black/African-American, Hispanic/Latina, Asian, South Asian, and Biracial, including of Native American and Middle Eastern descent.
