= Bartlett Township, Todd County, Minnesota =

Bartlett Township, Minnesota
- Township
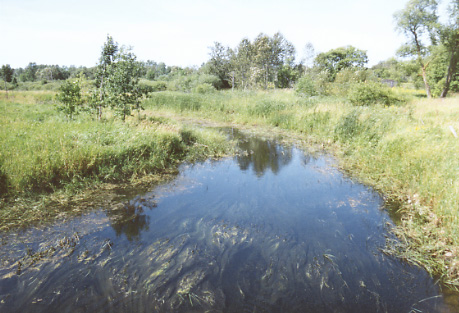
- The Partridge River in Bartlett Township in 2004

- Location within the state of Minnesota Bartlett Township, Minnesota (the United States)
- Coordinates: 46°19′40″N 94°58′37″W
- Country: United States
- State: Minnesota
- County: Todd

Area
  - Total: 35.9 sq mi (93.0 km^{2})
  - Land: 35.9 sq mi (93.0 km^{2})
  - Water: 0 sq mi (0.0 km^{2})
- Elevation: 1,332 ft (406 m)

Population (2020)
  - Total: 452
  - Density: 9.6/sq mi (3.7/km^{2})
- Time zone: UTC-6 (Central (CST))
  - Summer (DST): UTC-5 (CDT)
- FIPS code: 27-03790
- GNIS feature ID: 0663515

Bartlett Township is a township in Todd County, Minnesota, United States. The population was 348 at the 2000 census and by the 2020 Census it had grown to 452.

Bartlett Township was organized in 1883, and named after a family of early settlers.

== Geography ==
According to the United States Census Bureau, the township has a total area of 35.9 square miles (93 km^{2}), all land. The Partridge River flows through the township.

== Demographics ==
As of the census of 2000, there were 348 people, 129 households, and 102 families residing in the township. The population density was 9.7 inhabitants per square mile (3.7/km^{2}). There were 141 housing units at an average density of 3.9 per square mile (1.5/km^{2}). The racial makeup of the township was 99.43% White, 0.29% Asian, 0.29% from other races. Hispanic or Latino of any race were 0.29% of the population.

There were 129 households, out of which 29.5% had children under the age of 18 living with them, 69.0% were married couples living together, 7.8% had a female householder with no husband present, and 20.2% were non-families. 17.1% of all households were made up of individuals, and 6.2% had someone living alone who was 65 years of age or older. The average household size was 2.70 and the average family size was 3.04.

In the township the population was spread out, with 24.4% under the age of 18, 10.3% from 18 to 24, 23.0% from 25 to 44, 28.4% from 45 to 64, and 13.8% who were 65 years of age or older. The median age was 40 years. For every 100 females, there were 102.3 males. For every 100 females age 18 and over, there were 99.2 males.

The median income for a household in the township was $33,654, and the median income for a family was $34,904. Males had a median income of $28,125 versus $20,625 for females. The per capita income for the township was $16,374. About 16.5% of families and 13.0% of the population were below the poverty line, including 14.0% of those under age 18 and 32.1% of those age 65 or over.
