= Leaf River, Illinois =

Leaf River
- Village
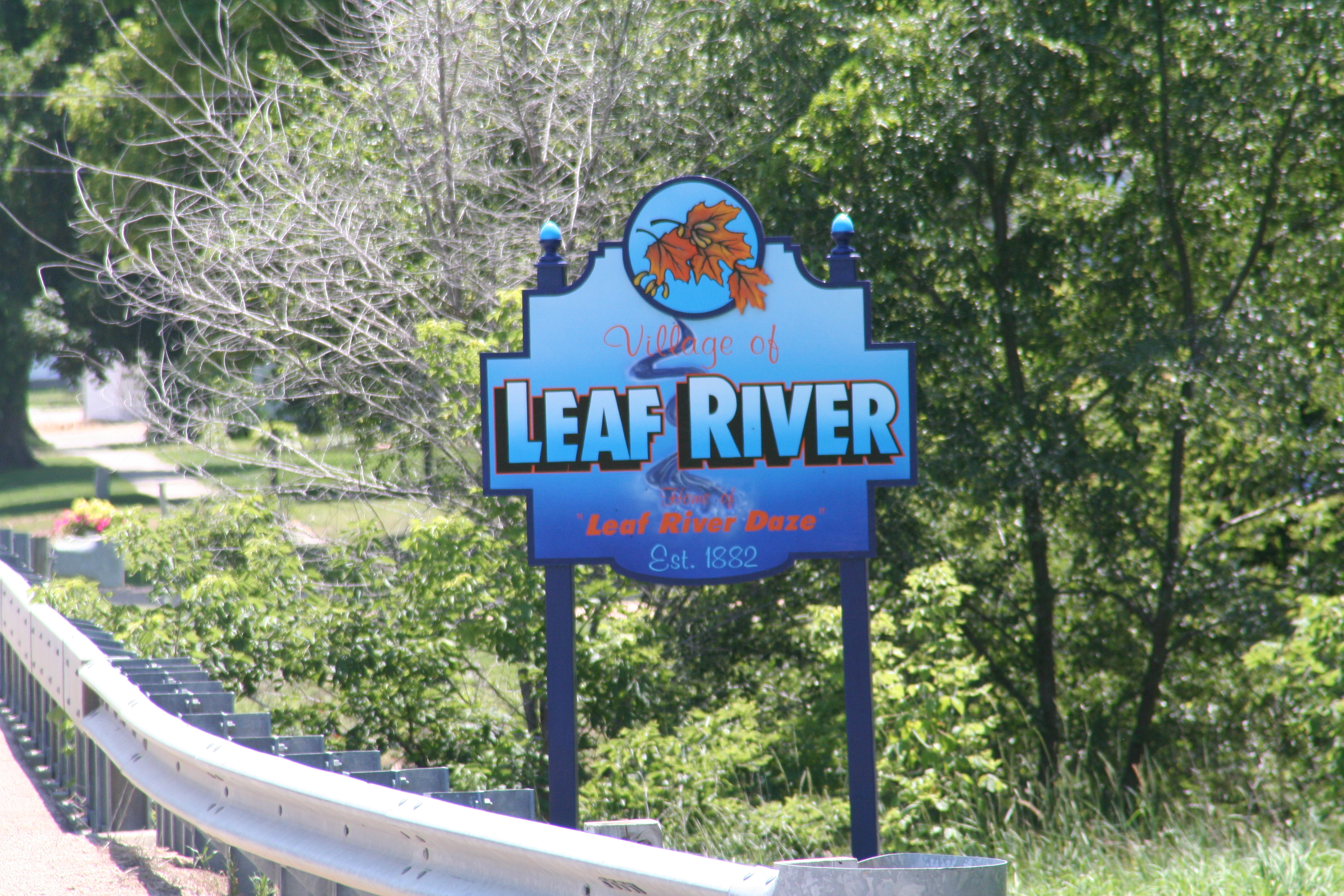
- Sign seen when entering Leaf River

- Location of Leaf River in Ogle County, Illinois.

- Location within Ogle County Leaf River (Illinois)
- Coordinates: 42°07′35″N 89°24′11″W
- Country: United States
- State: Illinois
- County: Ogle
- Township: Leaf River
- Established: 1882

Area
  - Total: 0.87 sq mi (2.25 km^{2})
  - Land: 0.87 sq mi (2.25 km^{2})
  - Water: 0 sq mi (0.00 km^{2})
- Elevation: 725 ft (221 m)

Population (2020)
  - Total: 432
  - Density: 497.1/sq mi (191.95/km^{2})
- Time zone: UTC-6 (CST)
  - Summer (DST): UTC-5 (CDT)
- Postal code: 61047
- Area code: 815
- FIPS code: 17-42457
- GNIS feature ID: 2398406
- Website: www.villageofleafriver.com

Leaf River is a village in Leaf River Township, Ogle County, Illinois, United States, along a stream of the same name. As of the 2020 census, Leaf River had a population of 432.

== Geography ==
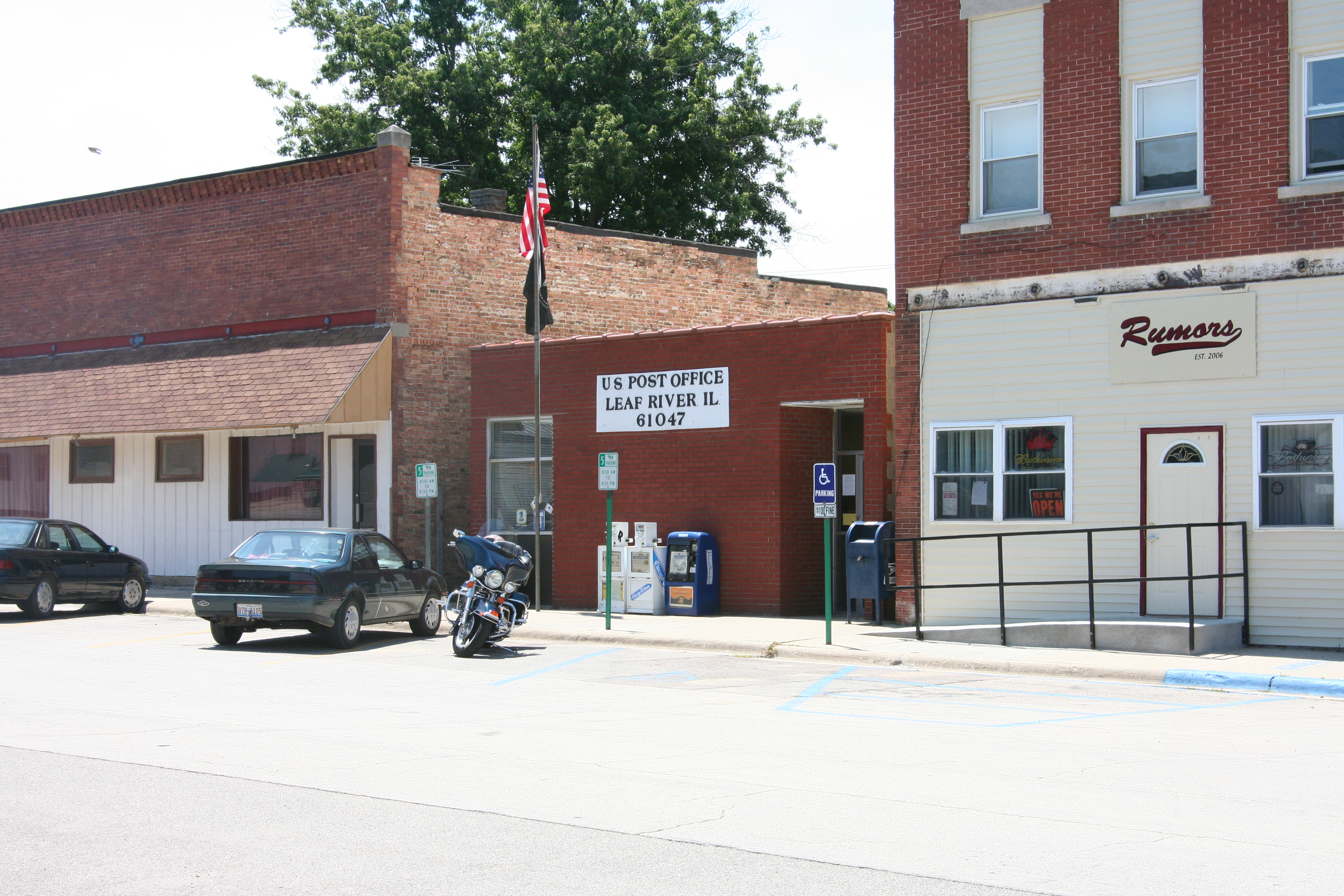
Post office on the main road of Leaf River

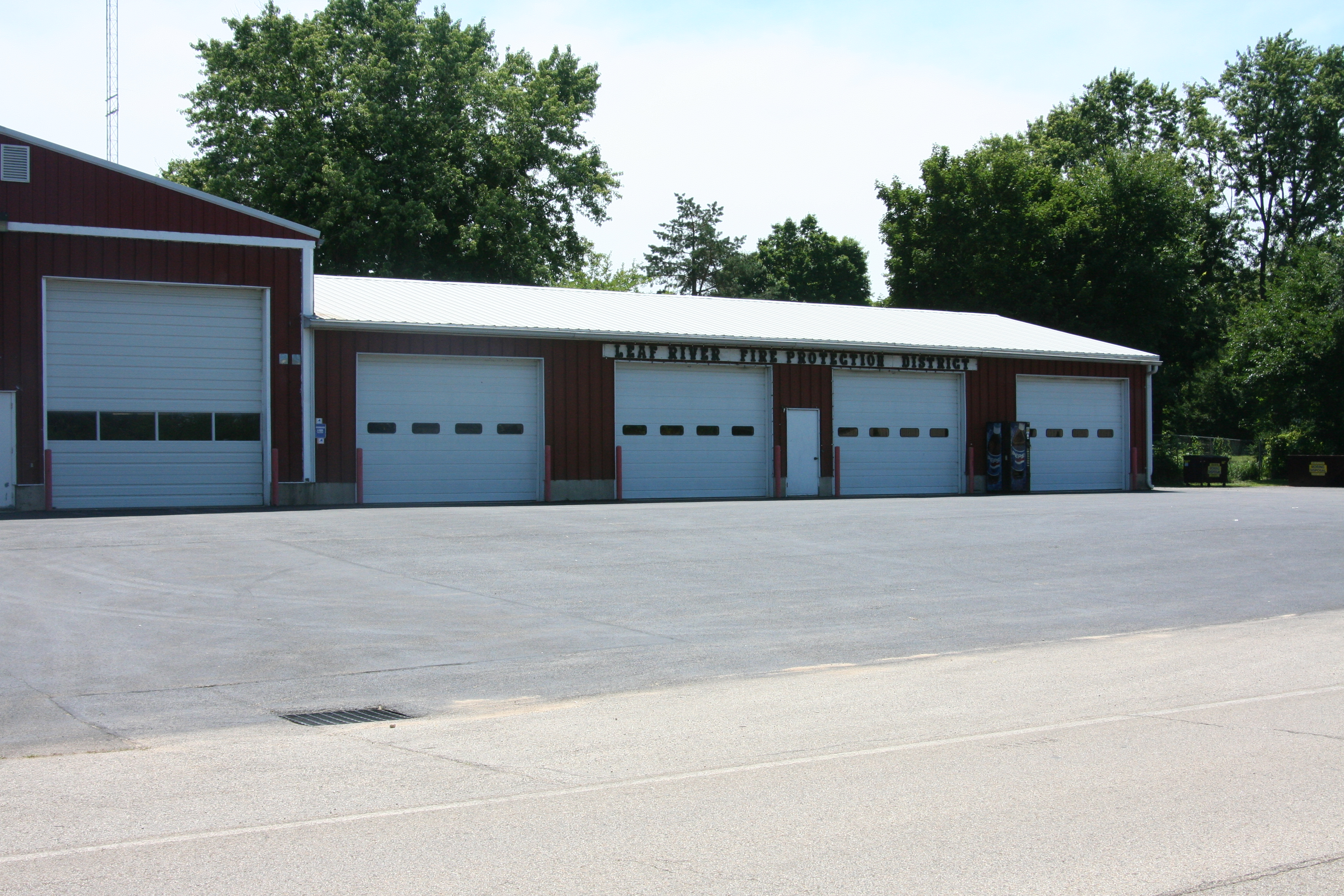
Leaf River Fire Station

According to the 2010 census, Leaf River has a total area of 0.83 square miles (2.15 km^{2}), all land.

== Demographics ==
Historical population
Census	Pop.	Note	%±
1890	339		—
1900	507		49.6%
1910	469		−7.5%
1920	388		−17.3%
1930	382		−1.5%
1940	415		8.6%
1950	444		7.0%
1960	546		23.0%
1970	633		15.9%
1980	637		0.6%
1990	546		−14.3%
2000	555		1.6%
2010	443		−20.2%
2020	432		−2.5%
U.S. Decennial Census

As of the census of 2000, there were 555 people, 214 households, and 154 families residing in the village. The population density was 647.6 inhabitants per square mile (250.0/km^{2}). There were 235 housing units at an average density of 274.2 per square mile (105.9/km^{2}). The racial makeup of the village was 98.20% White, 1.62% African American and 0.18% Native American. Hispanic or Latino of any race were 0.72% of the population.

There were 214 households, out of which 32.7% had children under the age of 18 living with them, 58.9% were married couples living together, 9.8% had a female householder with no husband present, and 28.0% were non-families. 21.5% of all households were made up of individuals, and 5.1% had someone living alone who was 65 years of age or older. The average household size was 2.59 and the average family size was 3.07.

In the village, the population was spread out, with 26.5% under the age of 18, 8.1% from 18 to 24, 29.5% from 25 to 44, 23.2% from 45 to 64, and 12.6% who were 65 years of age or older. The median age was 35 years. For every 100 females, there were 92.7 males. For every 100 females age 18 and over, there were 95.2 males.

The median income for a household in the village was $36,528, and the median income for a family was $40,268. Males had a median income of $33,958 versus $21,000 for females. The per capita income for the village was $15,620. About 2.5% of families and 5.7% of the population were below the poverty line, including 3.1% of those under age 18 and 7.6% of those age 65 or over.

== Facilities ==
The village is the home of Camp Kupugani, a private multicultural summer camp for boys and girls.

== Education ==
It is in the Forrestville Valley School District 221.
