= Stowe Prairie Township, Todd County, Minnesota =

Stowe Prairie Township, Minnesota
- Township
- Location within the state of Minnesota Stowe Prairie Township, Minnesota (the United States)
- Coordinates: 46°20′20″N 95°5′24″W
- Country: United States
- State: Minnesota
- County: Todd

Area
  - Total: 33.9 sq mi (87.8 km^{2})
  - Land: 33.8 sq mi (87.6 km^{2})
  - Water: 0.039 sq mi (0.1 km^{2})
- Elevation: 1,371 ft (418 m)

Population (2020)
  - Total: 488
  - Density: 16/sq mi (6/km^{2})
- Time zone: UTC-6 (Central (CST))
  - Summer (DST): UTC-5 (CDT)
- FIPS code: 27-63058
- GNIS feature ID: 0665724

Stowe Prairie Township is a township in Todd County, Minnesota, United States. The population was 529 at the 2000 census. It had declined to 488 people by the 2020 census.

Stowe Prairie Township was organized in 1877 and named for the pioneer settlers the Stowe brothers. The township is in the most northwesterly corner of the County and the village of Hewitt is located in the center of the township. A village called Nebo, or Mount Nebo, was located just north of Hewitt. It had a post office from 1880 - 1893.

== Geography ==
According to the United States Census Bureau, the township has a total area of 33.9 square miles (87.7 km^{2}); 33.8 square miles (87.6 km^{2}) is land and 0.1 square mile (0.2 km^{2}) (0.18%) is water.

== Demographics ==
As of the census of 2000, there were 529 people, 178 households, and 139 families residing in the township. The population density was 15.6 people per square mile (6.0/km^{2}). There were 191 housing units at an average density of 5.6/sq mi (2.2/km^{2}). The racial makeup of the township was 98.30% White, 0.19% Native American, 0.19% Asian, and 1.32% from two or more races. Hispanic or Latino of any race were 0.38% of the population.

There were 178 households, out of which 41.6% had children under the age of 18 living with them, 66.9% were married couples living together, 6.7% had a female householder with no husband present, and 21.9% were non-families. 18.0% of all households were made up of individuals, and 7.9% had someone living alone who was 65 years of age or older. The average household size was 2.97 and the average family size was 3.37.

In the township the population was spread out, with 32.3% under the age of 18, 8.9% from 18 to 24, 25.9% from 25 to 44, 23.6% from 45 to 64, and 9.3% who were 65 years of age or older. The median age was 35 years. For every 100 females, there were 101.9 males. For every 100 females age 18 and over, there were 104.6 males.

The median income for a household in the township was $35,750, and the median income for a family was $38,889. Males had a median income of $27,054 versus $21,917 for females. The per capita income for the township was $12,229. About 8.3% of families and 9.6% of the population were below the poverty line, including none of those under age 18 and 25.6% of those age 65 or over.
