= Wing River Township, Wadena County, Minnesota =

Wing River Township, Minnesota
- Township
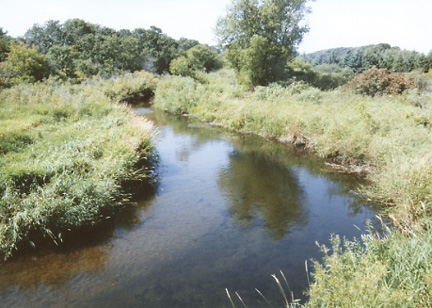
- The Wing River for which the township is named, as pictured near Verndale

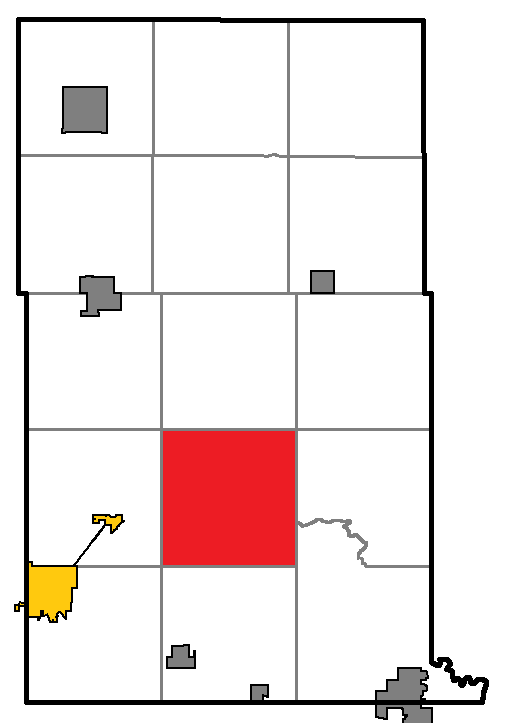
- Location of Wing River Township, within Wadena County, Minnesota
- Coordinates: 46°30′12″N 94°58′43″W
- Country: United States
- State: Minnesota
- County: Wadena

Area
  - Total: 36.0 sq mi (93.3 km^{2})
  - Land: 36.0 sq mi (93.3 km^{2})
  - Water: 0.039 sq mi (0.1 km^{2})
- Elevation: 1,302 ft (397 m)

Population (2020)
  - Total: 422
  - Density: 11.7/sq mi (4.52/km^{2})
- Time zone: UTC-6 (Central (CST))
  - Summer (DST): UTC-5 (CDT)
- ZIP code: 56481
- Area code: 218
- FIPS code: 27-70906
- GNIS feature ID: 0666020

Wing River Township is a township in Wadena County, Minnesota, United States. As of the 2020 census, the population was 422. The township is named for the Wing River, which converges with the Leaf River within its boundaries.

== Geography ==
According to the United States Census Bureau, the township encompassing a total area of 36.0 square miles (93.3 km²), with 36.0 square miles (93.3 km²) designated as land and 0.04 square miles (0.1 km²), or 0.06%, classified as water. Within the township, the historic site of Réaume's Trading Post, dating back to 1792, is included in the National Register of Historic Places.

== Demographics ==
As of the census of 2000, there were 430 people, 166 households, and 122 families residing in the township. The population density was 11.9 people per square mile (4.6/km^{2}). There were 196 housing units at an average density of 5.4/sq mi (2.1/km^{2}). The racial makeup of the township was 98.84% White, 0.23% African American, 0.23% Native American, 0.70% from other races. Hispanic or Latino of any race were 0.70% of the population.

Of the 166 households, 30.1% included children under the age of 18, 66.9% were headed by married couples, 4.2% were female-headed households with no husband present, and 26.5% were non-family households. Furthermore, 22.3% of all households were composed of individuals, with 10.2% having a resident aged 65 or older living alone. The mean household size was 2.59, while the average family size was 3.05.

The population of the township was distributed as follows: 25.1% were under the age of 18, 8.1% were between 18 and 24, 21.4% were between 25 and 44, 29.5% were between 45 and 64, and 15.8% were 65 years of age or older. The median age was 42. The gender ratio was 102.8 males for every 100 females, rising to 109.1 males for every 100 females aged 18 and over.

The median household income in the township was $35,469, with the median family income at $39,063. Males earned a median income of $29,375, compared to $26,250 for females. The per capita income was $13,634. Approximately 3.7% of families and 7.3% of the population lived below the poverty line, including 9.9% of individuals under 18 and 5.5% of those aged 65 or older.
