= Wing River (Leaf River tributary) =

River in Minnesota, United States

Coordinates: 46°28′48″N 94°58′49″W

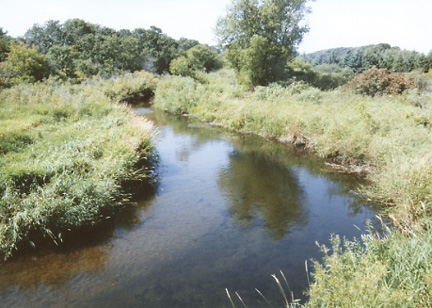
The Wing River near Verndale in Wadena County in 2004

The Wing River is a 48.2-mile-long (77.6 km) tributary of the Leaf River in west-central Minnesota in the United States. Via the Leaf and Crow Wing rivers, it is part of the Mississippi River watershed. Wing River Township is named for the river.

== Course ==
The Wing River rises in Wing River Lake in Elmo Township of southeastern Otter Tail County and flows generally northeastwardly through northwestern Todd and southern Wadena counties, past the town of Hewitt. It joins the Leaf River from the south in Wing River Township of Wadena County.

== Cultural information ==
Leaf River was the principal river route serving west-central Minnesota. The Dakota and Ojibwe used its course and the Otter-tail Portage — connecting West Leaf Lake with Otter Tail Lake — to access the waterways associated with the Red River of the North. In 1847, lands south of the Leaf River were ceded by the Ojibwe to allow the United States to establish a homeland for the Menominee. However, due to on-going and relentless skirmishes between the Ojibwe and the Dakota, the Menomini peoples declined the offers made by the United States and remained in Wisconsin.

== See also ==
- List of rivers of Minnesota
