= Bertha Township, Todd County, Minnesota =

Bertha Township, Minnesota
- Township
- Location within the state of Minnesota Bertha Township, Minnesota (the United States)
- Coordinates: 46°14′24″N 95°5′8″W
- Country: United States
- State: Minnesota
- County: Todd

Area
  - Total: 35.4 sq mi (91.8 km^{2})
  - Land: 35.4 sq mi (91.8 km^{2})
  - Water: 0 sq mi (0.0 km^{2})
- Elevation: 1,421 ft (433 m)

Population (2020)
  - Total: 401
  - Density: 11/sq mi (4.3/km^{2})
- Time zone: UTC-6 (Central (CST))
  - Summer (DST): UTC-5 (CDT)
- ZIP code: 56437
- Area code: 218
- FIPS code: 27-05500
- GNIS feature ID: 0663578

Bertha Township is a township in Todd County, Minnesota, United States. The population was 397 at the 2000 census and rose to 401 for the 2020 census.

Bertha Township was organized in 1878, and named for Bertha Ristan, an early settler.

== Geography ==
According to the United States Census Bureau, the township has a total area of 35.4 square miles (92 km^{2}), all land.

== Demographics ==
As of the census of 2000, there were 397 people, 141 households, and 116 families residing in the township. The population density was 11.2 inhabitants per square mile (4.3/km^{2}). There were 154 housing units at an average density of 4.3 per square mile (1.7/km^{2}). The racial makeup of the township was 98.99% White, and 1.01% from two or more races. Hispanic or Latino of any race were 0.25% of the population.

There were 141 households, out of which 35.5% had children under the age of 18 living with them, 71.6% were married couples living together, 4.3% had a female householder with no husband present, and 17.7% were non-families. 14.9% of all households were made up of individuals, and 7.8% had someone living alone who was 65 years of age or older. The average household size was 2.82 and the average family size was 3.14.

In the township the population was spread out, with 26.4% under the age of 18, 6.5% from 18 to 24, 24.7% from 25 to 44, 27.2% from 45 to 64, and 15.1% who were 65 years of age or older. The median age was 42 years. For every 100 females, there were 118.1 males. For every 100 females age 18 and over, there were 117.9 males.

The median income for a household in the township was $31,250, and the median income for a family was $34,375. Males had a median income of $25,000 versus $21,000 for females. The per capita income for the township was $13,151. About 14.5% of families and 14.0% of the population were below the poverty line, including 18.1% of those under age 18 and 17.2% of those age 65 or over.
