= Adeline, Illinois =

- Village
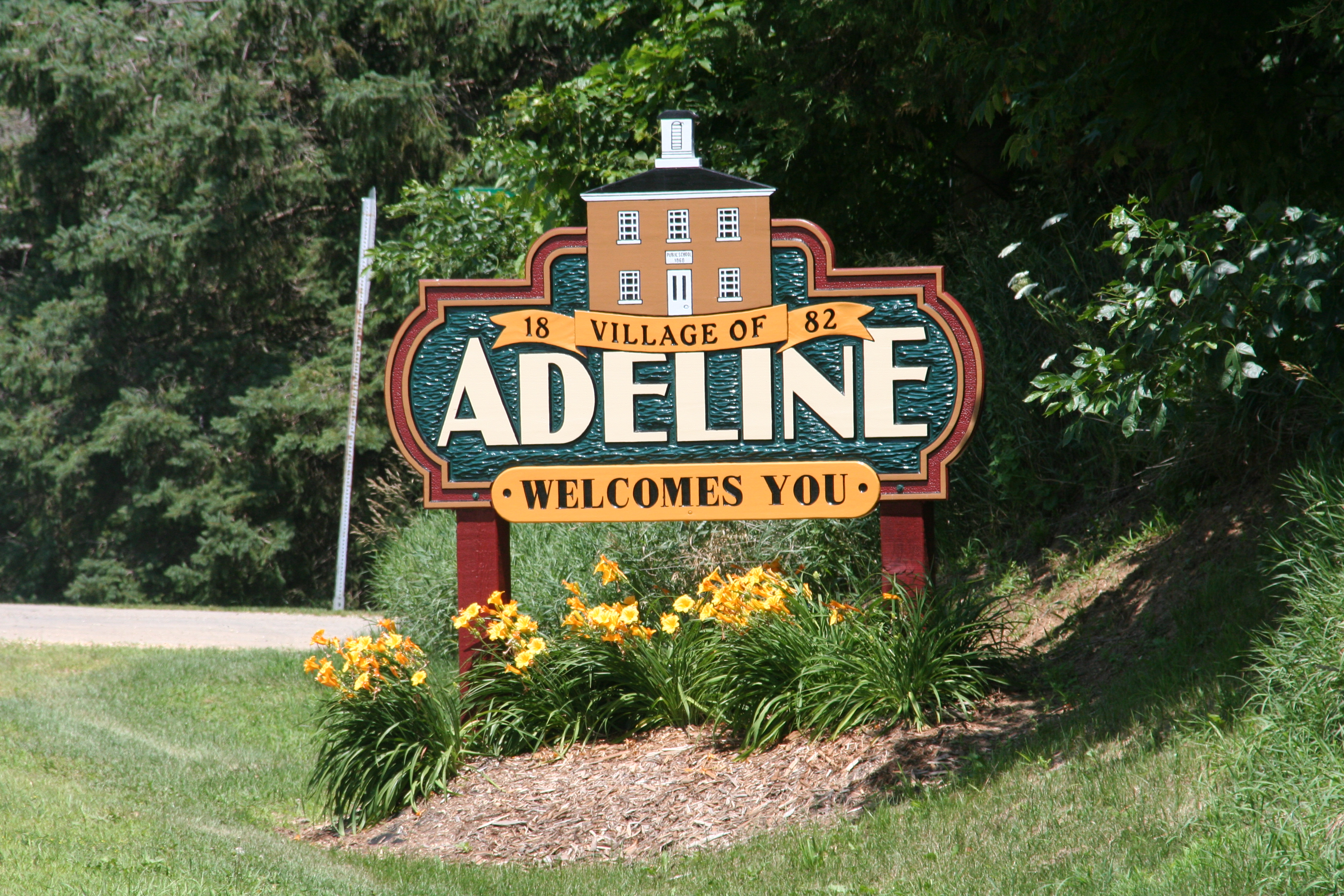
- Sign leading into Adeline
- Interactive map of Adeline, Illinois
- Location within Ogle County Adeline, Illinois (Illinois)
- Coordinates: 42°08′26″N 89°29′31″W
- Country: United States
- State: Illinois
- County: Ogle
- Township: Maryland

Area
  - Total: 0.27 sq mi (0.69 km^{2})
  - Land: 0.27 sq mi (0.69 km^{2})
  - Water: 0 sq mi (0.00 km^{2})
- Elevation: 804 ft (245 m)

Population (2020)
  - Total: 78
  - Density: 293.0/sq mi (113.12/km^{2})
- Time zone: UTC-6 (CST)
  - Summer (DST): UTC-5 (CDT)
- Postal code: 61047
- Area codes: 815, 779
- FIPS code: 17-00295
- GNIS feature ID: 2397914

Adeline is a village in Maryland Township, Ogle County, Illinois, United States, along the Leaf River. As of the 2020 census, Adeline had a population of 78.

== History ==
Adeline was laid out in 1845. The village's name honors the wife of Thomas J. Turner, a state legislator.

== Geography ==
According to the 2010 census, Adeline has a total area of 0.26 square miles (0.67 km^{2}), all land.

== Demographics ==
Historical population
Census	Pop.	Note	%±
1880	196		—
1890	256		30.6%
1900	216		−15.6%
1910	155		−28.2%
1920	140		−9.7%
1930	155		10.7%
1940	176		13.5%
1950	135		−23.3%
1960	130		−3.7%
1970	156		20.0%
1980	163		4.5%
1990	141		−13.5%
2000	139		−1.4%
2010	85		−38.8%
2020	78		−8.2%
U.S. Decennial Census

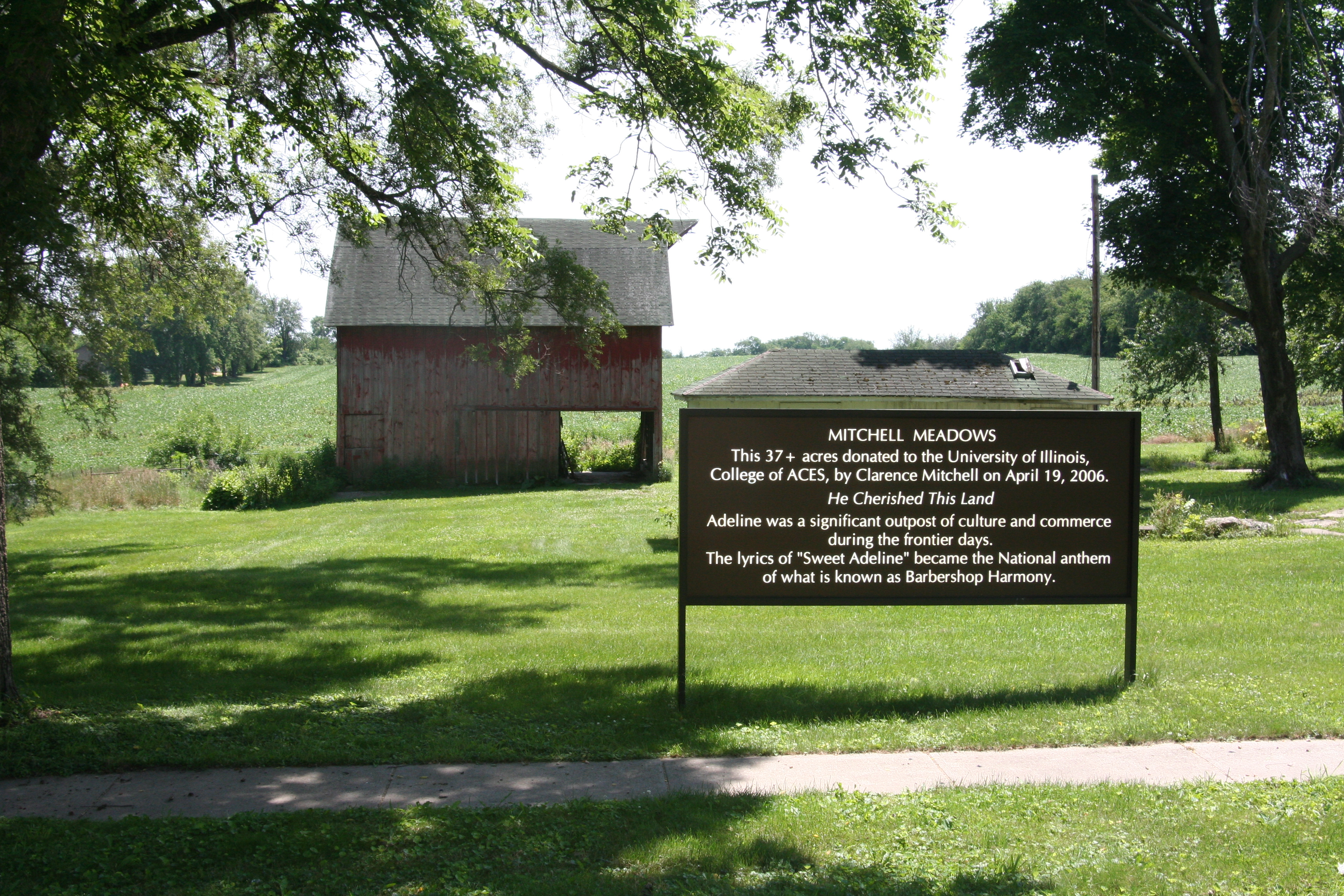
Mitchell Meadows in Adeline

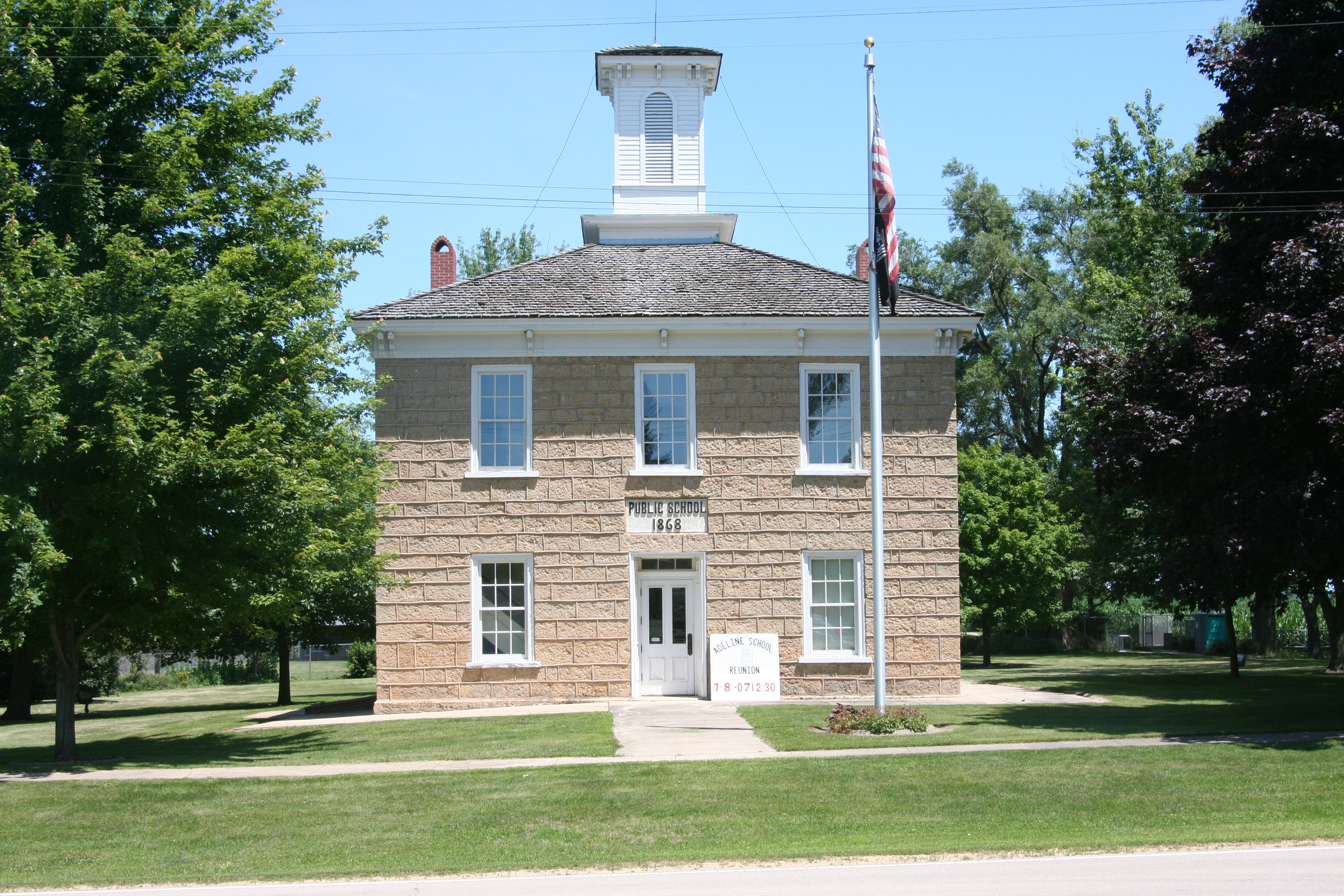
Old School in Adeline, built 1868

As of the census of 2000, there were 139 people, 50 households, and 39 families residing in the village. The population density was 517.1 inhabitants per square mile (199.7/km^{2}). There were 50 housing units at an average density of 186.0 per square mile (71.8/km^{2}). The racial makeup of the village was 97.12% White, 0.72% Native American, 2.16% from other races. Hispanic or Latino of any race were 2.88% of the population.

There were 50 households, out of which 40.0% had children under the age of 18 living with them, 64.0% were married couples living together, 12.0% had a female householder with no husband present, and 22.0% were non-families. 16.0% of all households were made up of individuals, and 4.0% had someone living alone who was 65 years of age or older. The average household size was 2.78 and the average family size was 3.18.

In the village, the population was spread out, with 28.1% under the age of 18, 5.8% from 18 to 24, 30.2% from 25 to 44, 28.1% from 45 to 64, and 7.9% who were 65 years of age or older. The median age was 38 years. For every 100 females, there were 93.1 males. For every 100 females age 18 and over, there were 100.0 males.

The median income for a household in the village was $59,583, and the median income for a family was $61,250. Males had a median income of $44,688 versus $36,250 for females. The per capita income for the village was $20,301. There were 4.5% of families and 2.8% of the population living below the poverty line, including no under eighteens and 33.3% of those over 64.

== Education ==
It is in the Forrestville Valley School District 221.
