= Hewitt, Minnesota =

City in Minnesota, United States

Hewitt
- City
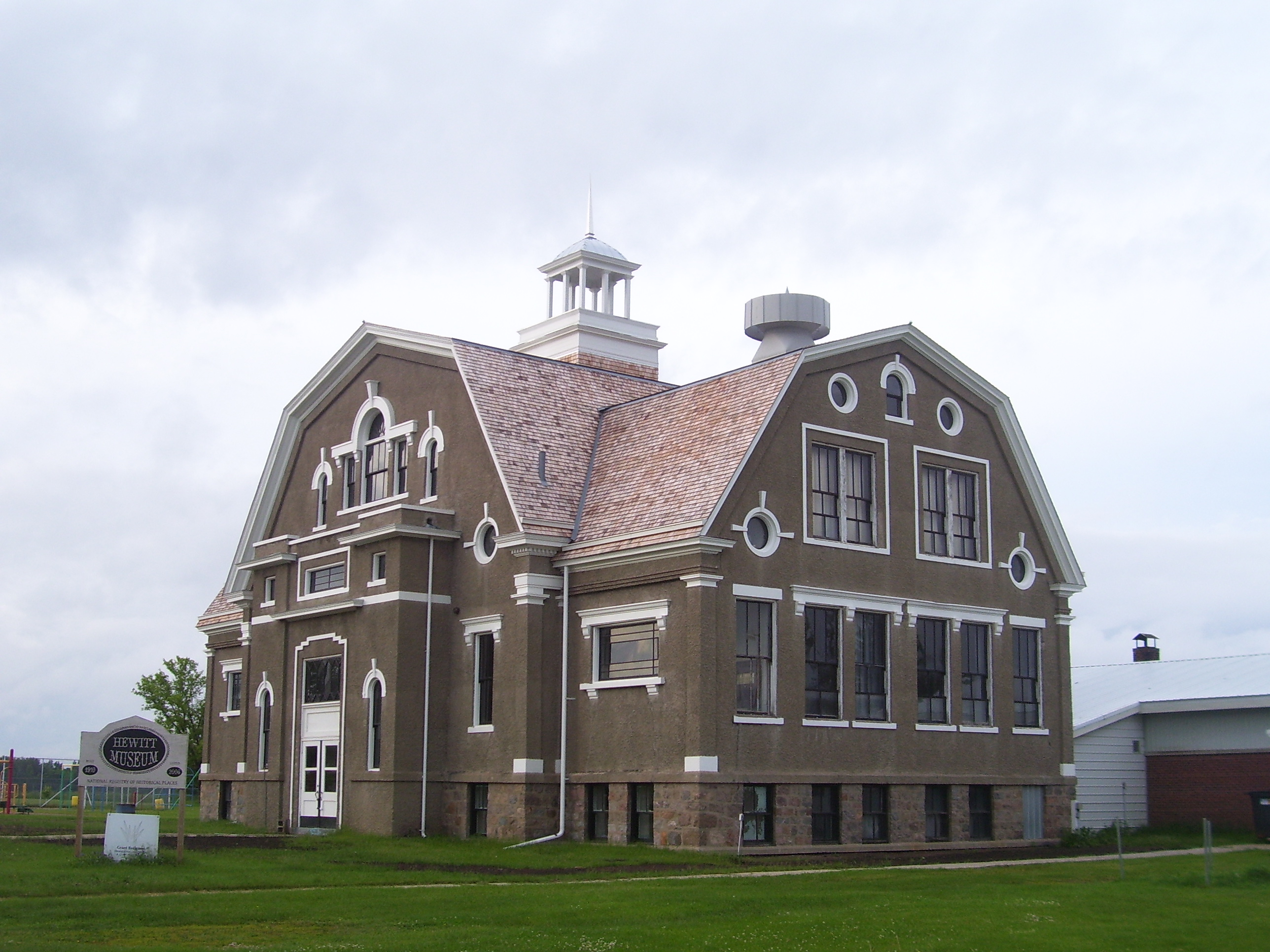
- Hewitt Public School Museum

- Location of Hewitt, Minnesota
- Coordinates: 46°19′26″N 95°05′25″W
- Country: United States
- State: Minnesota
- County: Todd

Area
  - Total: 2.06 sq mi (5.34 km^{2})
  - Land: 2.06 sq mi (5.34 km^{2})
  - Water: 0 sq mi (0.00 km^{2})
- Elevation: 1,371 ft (418 m)

Population (2020)
  - Total: 251
  - Density: 121.7/sq mi (46.97/km^{2})
- Time zone: UTC-6 (Central (CST))
  - Summer (DST): UTC-5 (CDT)
- ZIP code: 56453
- Area code: 218
- FIPS code: 27-28754
- GNIS feature ID: 2394367
- Website: https://mycityofhewittmn.weebly.com/

Hewitt is a city in Todd County, Minnesota, United States, along the Wing River. The population was 266 at the 2010 census. It was 251 by the time of the 2020 Decennial Census.

== History ==
Hewitt was platted in 1891, and named for Henry Hewitt, an early settler. A post office has been in operation at Hewitt since 1891. The Hewitt Public School, built in 1911, is listed on the National Register of Historic Places.

== Geography ==
According to the United States Census Bureau, the city has a total area of 2.05 square miles (5.31 km^{2}), all land.

U.S. Route 71 and Minnesota State Highway 210 are two of the main routes in the community.

== Demographics ==
Historical population
Census	Pop.	Note	%±
1900	311		—
1910	322		3.5%
1920	399		23.9%
1930	309		−22.6%
1940	294		−4.9%
1950	312		6.1%
1960	267		−14.4%
1970	198		−25.8%
1980	299		51.0%
1990	269		−10.0%
2000	267		−0.7%
2010	266		−0.4%
2020	251		−5.6%
U.S. Decennial Census

=== 2010 census ===
As of the census of 2010, there were 266 people, 113 households, and 64 families living in the city. The population density was 129.8 inhabitants per square mile (50.1/km^{2}). There were 129 housing units at an average density of 62.9 per square mile (24.3/km^{2}). The racial makeup of the city was 100.0% White. Hispanic or Latino of any race were 1.1% of the population.

There were 113 households, of which 28.3% had children under the age of 18 living with them, 46.0% were married couples living together, 6.2% had a female householder with no husband present, 4.4% had a male householder with no wife present, and 43.4% were non-families. 36.3% of all households were made up of individuals, and 15.9% had someone living alone who was 65 years of age or older. The average household size was 2.35 and the average family size was 3.17.

The median age in the city was 40.3 years. 25.2% of residents were under the age of 18; 5.6% were between the ages of 18 and 24; 25.2% were from 25 to 44; 28.2% were from 45 to 64; and 15.8% were 65 years of age or older. The gender makeup of the city was 46.6% male and 53.4% female.

=== 2000 census ===
As of the census of 2000, there were 267 people, 109 households, and 69 families living in the city. The population density was 130.3 inhabitants per square mile (50.3/km^{2}). There were 122 housing units at an average density of 59.5 per square mile (23.0/km^{2}). The racial makeup of the city was 98.88% White, 0.37% Native American, 0.37% Asian, and 0.37% from two or more races. Hispanic or Latino of any race were 0.75% of the population.

There were 109 households, out of which 29.4% had children under the age of 18 living with them, 51.4% were married couples living together, 6.4% had a female householder with no husband present, and 35.8% were non-families. 27.5% of all households were made up of individuals, and 14.7% had someone living alone who was 65 years of age or older. The average household size was 2.41 and the average family size was 2.90.

In the city, the population was spread out, with 23.6% under the age of 18, 10.5% from 18 to 24, 24.0% from 25 to 44, 22.8% from 45 to 64, and 19.1% who were 65 years of age or older. The median age was 38 years. For every 100 females, there were 110.2 males. For every 100 females age 18 and over, there were 104.0 males.

The median income for a household in the city was $26,161, and the median income for a family was $27,500. Males had a median income of $22,500 versus $18,750 for females. The per capita income for the city was $12,520. About 7.7% of families and 13.4% of the population were below the poverty line, including 7.3% of those under the age of eighteen and 18.1% of those 65 or over.
