= Leaf River Township, Illinois =

Leaf River Township
- Township
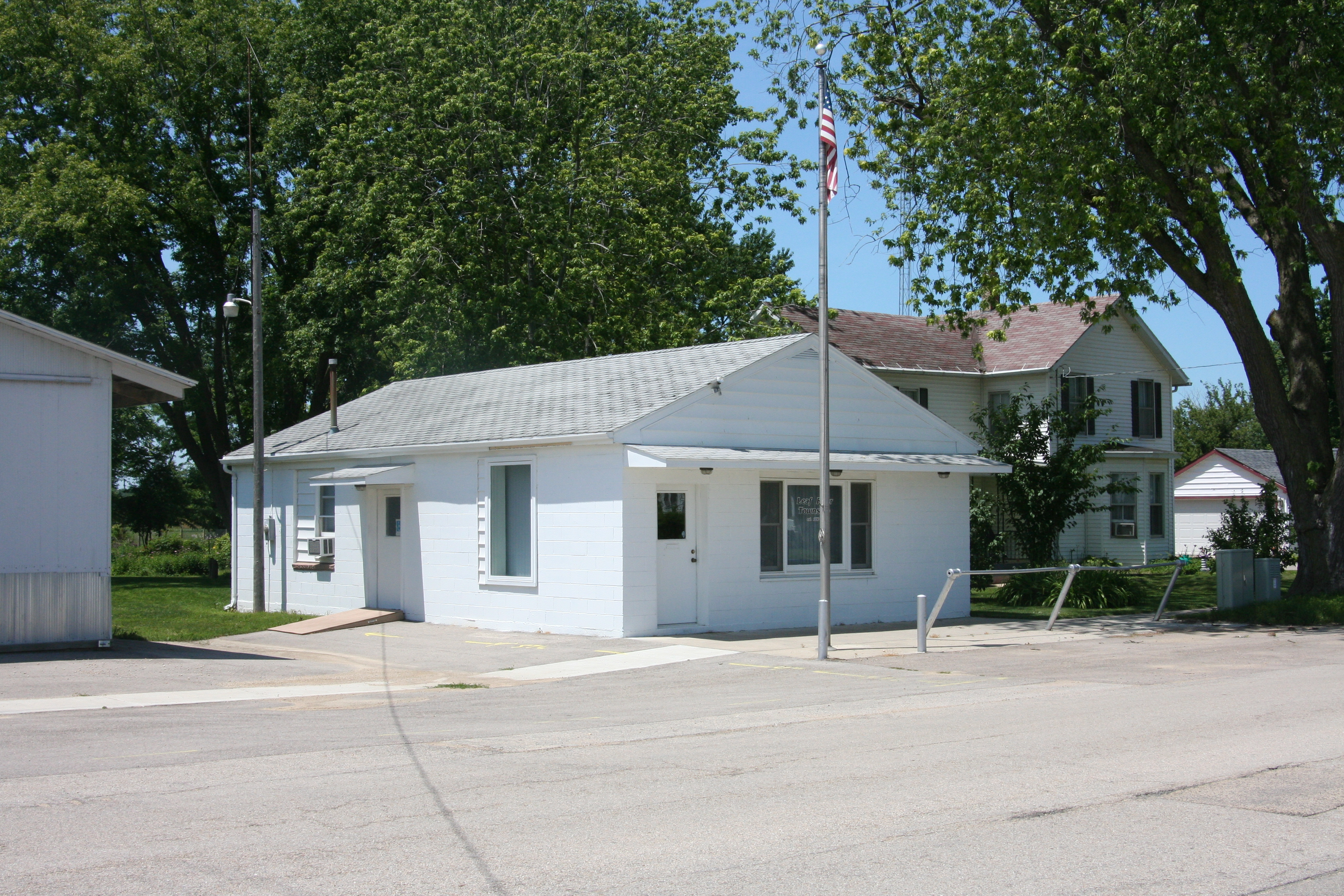
- Township building in Leaf River, Illinois.

- Location of Illinois in the United States
- Coordinates: 42°07′42″N 89°24′15″W
- Country: United States
- State: Illinois
- County: Ogle
- Settled: November 6, 1849

Government
  - Mayor: Leonard Hagemann

Area
  - Total: 35.75 sq mi (92.6 km^{2})
  - Land: 35.75 sq mi (92.6 km^{2})
  - Water: 0 sq mi (0 km^{2})
- Elevation: 830 ft (250 m)

Population (2010)
  - Estimate (2016): 1,080
  - Density: 31.8/sq mi (12.3/km^{2})
- Time zone: UTC-6 (CST)
  - Summer (DST): UTC-5 (CDT)
- FIPS code: 17-141-42470

Leaf River Township is located in Ogle County, Illinois. As of the 2010 census, its population was 1,137 and it contained 520 housing units.

== Geography ==
According to the 2010 census, the township has a total area of 35.75 square miles (92.6 km^{2}), all land.

== Demographics ==
Historical population
Census	Pop.	Note	%±
2016 (est.)	1,080
U.S. Decennial Census
