= Leaf River Township, Wadena County, Minnesota =

Leaf River Township, Minnesota
- Township
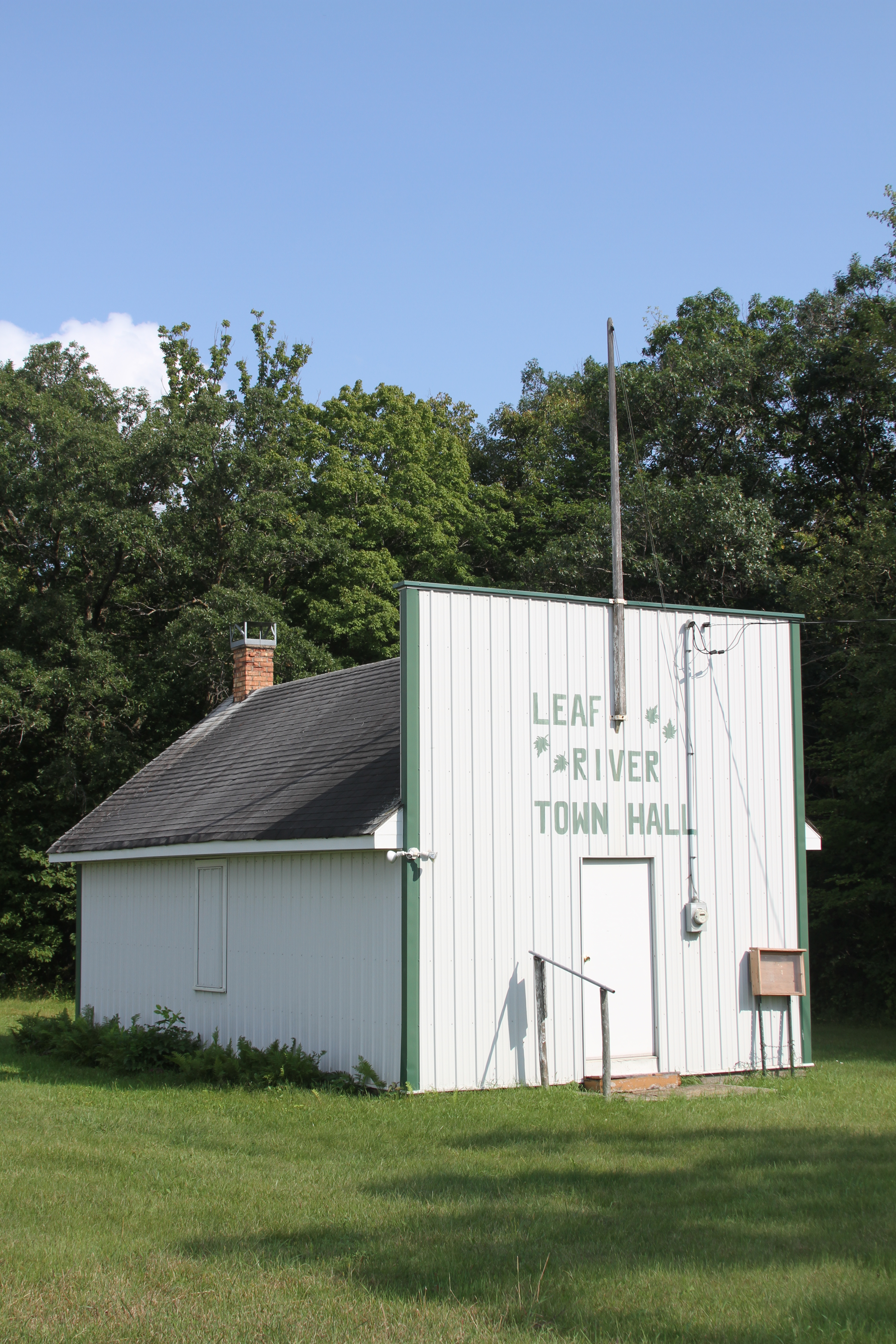
- Town hall

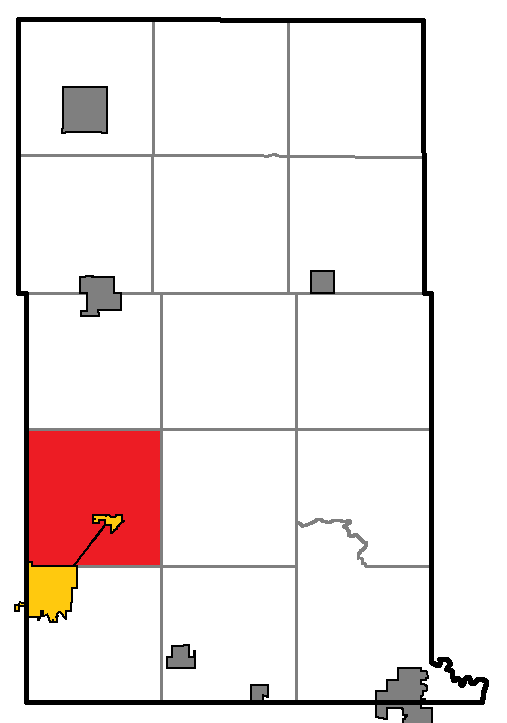
- Location of Leaf River Township, within Wadena County, Minnesota
- Coordinates: 46°29′39″N 95°6′5″W
- Country: United States
- State: Minnesota
- County: Wadena

Area
  - Total: 35.2 sq mi (91.1 km^{2})
  - Land: 35.2 sq mi (91.1 km^{2})
  - Water: 0 sq mi (0.0 km^{2})
- Elevation: 1,352 ft (412 m)

Population (2020)
  - Total: 473
  - Density: 13.4/sq mi (5.19/km^{2})
- Time zone: UTC-6 (Central (CST))
  - Summer (DST): UTC-5 (CDT)
- FIPS code: 27-36026
- GNIS feature ID: 0664739

Leaf River Township is a township in Wadena County, Minnesota, United States. The population was 473 at the 2020 census.

Leaf River Township was named after the Leaf River.

== Geography ==
According to the United States Census Bureau, the township has a total area of 35.2 square miles (91 km^{2}), all of it land.

== Demographics ==
As of the census of 2000, there were 515 people, 174 households, and 135 families residing in the township. The population density was 14.6 inhabitants per square mile (5.6/km^{2}). There were 196 housing units at an average density of 5.6 per square mile (2.2/km^{2}). The racial makeup of the township was 94.37% White, 2.14% African American, 1.75% Native American, 0.58% Asian, 0.19% Pacific Islander, and 0.97% from two or more races.

There were 174 households, out of which 31.6% had children under the age of 18 living with them, 75.9% were married couples living together, 0.6% had a female householder with no husband present, and 22.4% were non-families. 21.8% of all households were made up of individuals, and 10.3% had someone living alone who was 65 years of age or older. The average household size was 2.68 and the average family size was 3.16.

In the township the population was spread out, with 26.2% under the age of 18, 3.9% from 18 to 24, 23.9% from 25 to 44, 33.6% from 45 to 64, and 12.4% who were 65 years of age or older. The median age was 43 years. For every 100 females, there were 138.4 males. For every 100 females age 18 and over, there were 130.3 males.

The median income for a household in the township was $37,292, and the median income for a family was $46,750. Males had a median income of $32,411 versus $20,795 for females. The per capita income for the township was $14,681. About 6.5% of families and 19.3% of the population were below the poverty line, including 11.1% of those under age 18 and 28.0% of those age 65 or over.
