= Leaf River (Minnesota) =

River in Minnesota, United States

Coordinates: 46.4296848°N 94.8141848°W

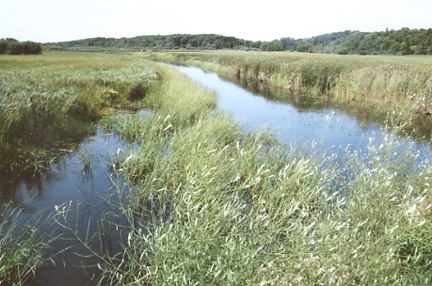
The Leaf River in Deer Creek Township of Otter Tail County in 2004

The Leaf River is a 43.6-mile-long (70.2 km) tributary of the Crow Wing River in west-central Minnesota in the United States. Via the Crow Wing, it is part of the Mississippi River watershed.

== Course ==
The Leaf rises from the Leaf Lakes chain (West, Middle and East) in northeastern Otter Tail County and flows generally east past the town of Bluffton into southern Wadena County. It joins the Crow Wing River from the west in Thomastown Township, about 10 miles (16 km) north-northwest of the town of Staples and about 1 mile (2 km) upstream of the mouth of the Partridge River. On the Crow between the Leaf and Partridge rivers are sites of pre-settlement fur trading posts.

The Leaf's largest tributaries are the Wing River and the Redeye River, both of which join it in Wadena County.

== Culture ==
Leaf River serves as land-cession boundary for the 1847 Treaty of Washington, signed between the Pillager Chippewas and the United States, and for the land-cession boundaries for the 1855 Treaty of Washington, signed between the Mississippi Chippewas, Pillager Chippewas and the United States. The land ceded to the United States by the Pillagers in 1847 was sold to the Menominee, but the Menominee refused removal out of Wisconsin and subsequently sold the land to the United States in 1854.

== Fishing ==
Fishing is popular on the leaf river. Species that reside in the leaf river include walleye, rock bass, northern pike, carp and suckers.

== See also ==
- List of rivers of Minnesota
