= Minnesota State Highway 227 =

State highway in Minnesota, United States

Trunk Highway 227
- MN 227 highlighted in red

Route information
- Maintained by MnDOT
- Length: 10.680 mi (17.188 km)
- Existed: July 1, 1949–2012

Major junctions
- West end: US 71 at Sebeka
- East end: CR 14 at Nimrod

Location
- Country: United States
- State: Minnesota
- Counties: Wadena

Highway system
- Minnesota Trunk Highway System; Interstate; US; State; Legislative; Scenic
← MN 226	→ MN 228

Minnesota State Highway 227 (MN 227) was a 10.680-mile-long (17.188 km) highway in north-central Minnesota, which ran from its intersection with U.S. Highway 71 and Wadena County Road 8 in Sebeka and continued east to its eastern terminus at its intersection with Wadena County Roads 12 and 14 in Nimrod near the Crow Wing River. The route was decommissioned in 2012 and it became an extension of Wadena County Road 12.

== Route description ==
Highway 227 served as an east–west route between Sebeka and Nimrod in north-central Minnesota.

Highway 227 was also known as Minnesota Avenue in Sebeka.

The route crossed the Redeye River.

The route was legally defined as Route 227 in the Minnesota Statutes.

== History ==
Highway 227 was authorized on July 1, 1949.

The western half of the route was paved when it was marked. The remainder was paved in 1952.

== Major intersections ==
The entire route is in Wadena County.

Location	mi	km	Destinations	Notes
Sebeka	0.000	0.000	US 71	
Sebeka	0.288	0.463	CR 52 (Jefferson Avenue)	
Meadow Township	3.726	5.996	CR 23 north	
North Germany Township	4.023	6.474	CR 23 south	
Nimrod	10.107	16.266	CR 26	
Nimrod	10.650	17.140	CR 12	
Nimrod	10.670	17.172	CR 14	
1.000 mi = 1.609 km; 1.000 km = 0.621 mi
