= Kossila Oxbow =

- Location within Minnesota
- Location: Wadena County, MN, United States
- Coordinates: 46°43′55.8552″N 94°55′19.0194″W
- Type: oxbow lake
- Basin countries: United States
- Max. length: 2,450 ft (747 m)
- Max. width: 390 ft (119 m)
- Surface elevation: 1,358 ft (414 m)
- Settlements: Shell River Township, MN

Kossila Oxbow is a geographical feature, classified as a Bend, located on the Crow Wing River in Wadena County, MN. Its center lies at a latitude of 46° 43' 55.8552" and longitude of -94° 55' 19.0194", and it has an elevation of 1,358 ft (414 m) above sea level. It is located approximately 1.1 mi (2 km) north of the Mary Brown Bridge and 2.7 mi (4 km) south of Huntersville Park, near Huntersville State Forest.

== Physical ==
Prior to 1943, Kossila Oxbow was an unnamed, naturally-formed horseshoe shaped bend, approximately 2450 feet in channel length, and 390 feet in downvalley length. Sometime shortly after 1943, the neck of the bend was artificially joined, giving way to an oxbow lake formation.

== History ==
Although oxbow lake formation is usually a naturally occurring phenomenon in meandering rivers and streams, Kossila Oxbow was man-made by Harold Frank Kossila (1881–1985), originally from Kauvatsa, Finland. In 1920, Kossila, his wife, Eva Hanninen Kossila (1882–1958), and their two sons, Frank and William, emigrated to the United States from Sedley, Saskatchewan, Canada to the rural area of Glyndon, Minnesota. There they managed the Mumford farm while Kossila began acquiring cattle. The 1933 Glyndon rural directory documented at the time that Kossila owned 12 head of cattle.

Between 1943 and 1945, Kossila purchased a total of 120 acres of land on the steep banks of the Crow Wing River in Shell Lake Township and moved his small farming operation here. A horseshoe-shaped river bend meandered through the west half of the property. Kossila converted the bend into an oxbow lake. Today the original farmhouse and bridge are no longer standing, but the land around Kossila Oxbow is still privately owned and maintained by the Kossila family.

== Name recognition ==
Kossila Oxbow represents a feature name collected during Phase I GNIS data compilation (1976-1981), primarily from existing U.S. Geological Survey 1:24,000-scale topographic maps of various edition dates.

Kossila Oxbow is listed with HikerCentral.com as "[a] cool spot to check out" for visitors to the area. TravelingLuck.com describes it as a "Local Feature".

Kossila Oxbow is the only named water feature in Shell River Township.
