= Huntersville =

Huntersville may refer to:

== Places ==
United States

- Huntersville, Indiana
- Huntersville, Maryland, St. Mary's County
- Huntersville, Minnesota
- Huntersville, North Carolina
- Huntersville, New York
- Huntersville, Ohio, an unincorporated community
- Huntersville, Virginia, a neighborhood in Norfolk
- Huntersville, West Virginia
- Huntersville Township, Minnesota

== See also ==
- Hunterville
