= Red eye =

Red eye, red-eye, redeye or variants may refer to:

== Related to the eye ==
- Red-eye effect, in photographs
- Red eye (medicine), an eye that appears red due to illness or injury
- Red, an extremely rare eye color due to albinism
- Red eyeshine in animals caused by tapetum lucidum

== Arts, entertainment and media ==
=== Fictional characters ===
- Red Eye, in video game Last Bronx
- The Red Eye, in The Tick comics
- Red Eye, the sub-boss from Sonic & Knuckles

=== Film, television and radio ===
- Red Eye (2005 American film), a psychological thriller
- Red Eye (2005 South Korean film), a horror film
- Red Eyes (film), a 1982 Canadian thriller drama film
- Red Eye (talk show), an American TV show
- Red Eye (British TV series), a 2023 thriller series
- Red Eye Radio, an American talk radio show

=== Music ===
- Redeye Distribution, an American record label
- Red Eye Records (label), an Australian record label
- Redeye (band), an American rock group
- "Red Eye", a song by Ace Enders from The Secret Wars, 2008
- "Red Eye", a song by Andy Grammer from Magazines or Novels, 2014
- "Red Eye", a song by Big K.R.I.T. from 4eva N a Day, 2012
- "Red Eye", a song by Devo from Duty Now for the Future, 1979
- "Red Eye" (Justin Bieber song), 2021
- "Red Eye", a song by Kid Cudi from Indicud, 2013
- "Red Eye", a song by Styles P from Float, 2013
- "Red-Eye", a song by The Album Leaf from Into the Blue Again, 2006
- "Red Eye" (YoungBoy Never Broke Again song), 2021
- "Red Eye, a song by Diplo and Heidi Klum.
- "Red Eyes" (song), by Karan Aujla, 2020
- "Red Eyes", a song by The War on Drugs from Lost in the Dream, 2014

=== Comics ===
- Red Eyes (manga), 2000-present
- Redeye (comics), a comic strip by Gordon Bess

== Food and drink ==
- Red eye (drink), a coffee drink
- Red eye (cocktail)
- Red-eye gravy, a thin sauce

== Places ==
- Red Eye Township, Wadena County, Minnesota, U.S.
- Redeye River, Minnesota, U.S.
- Redeye, Virginia, U.S.

== Other uses ==
- RedEye, a Chicago newspaper
- common name of the snake Agkistrodon contortrix mokasen
- common name of the snake Agkistrodon laticinctus
- FIM-43 Redeye, a man-portable surface-to-air missile system
- Red-eye flight, a flight scheduled to depart at night and arrive the next morning
- Paul Chaloner (born 1971), known as ReDeYe or Redeye, esports broadcast host
- Red Eye, a charity founded by Justin Mayo

== See also ==
- Conjunctivitis, or "pink eye"
- Sauron, a character in J. R. R. Tolkien's The Lord of the Rings
