= Nimrod, Minnesota =

City in Minnesota, United States

Nimrod
- City
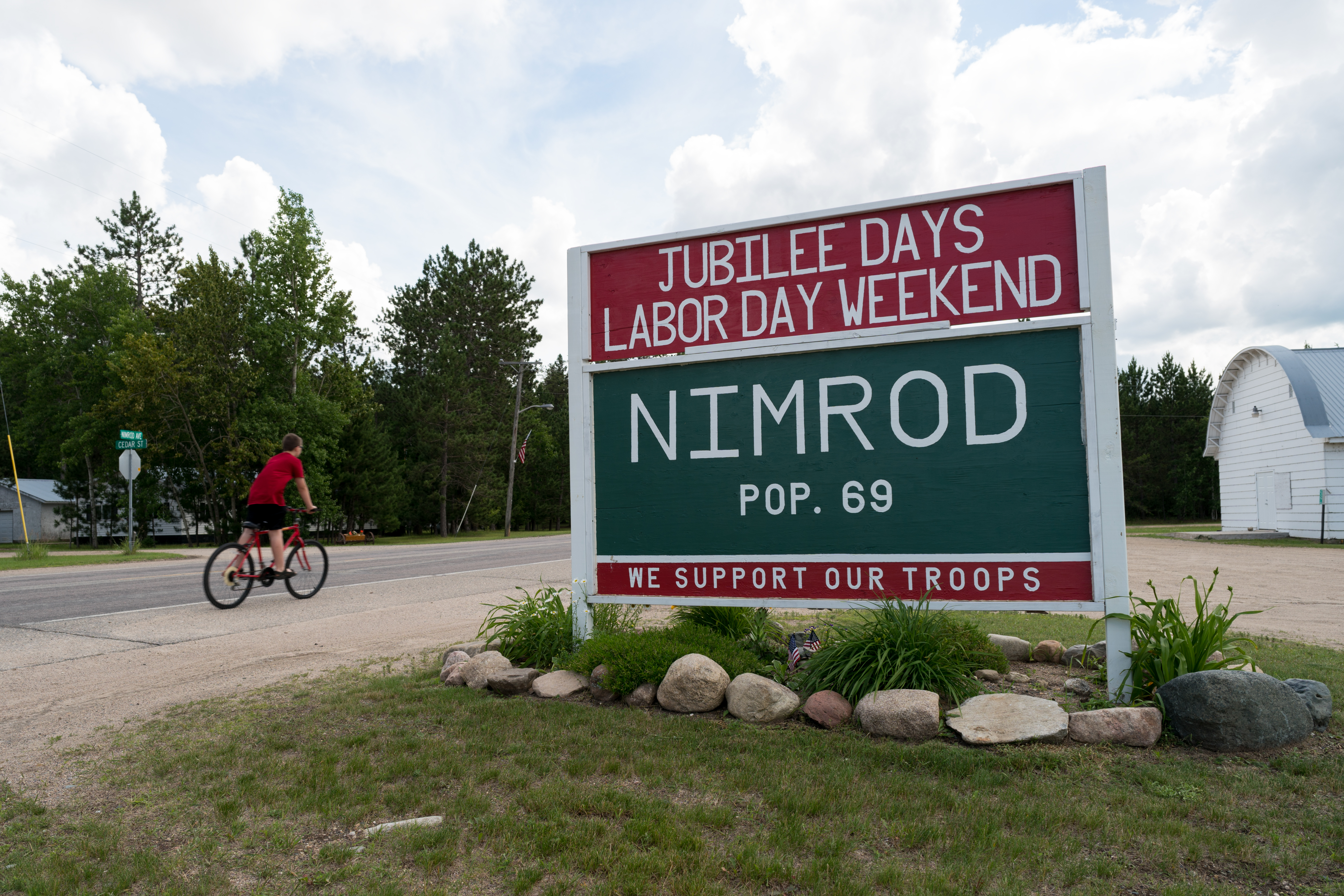
- Entrance to Nimrod

- Location of Nimrod, Minnesota
- Coordinates: 46°38′15″N 94°52′42″W
- Country: United States
- State: Minnesota
- County: Wadena
- Incorporated as a city: December 4, 1946

Area
  - Total: 1.01 sq mi (2.61 km^{2})
  - Land: 0.95 sq mi (2.47 km^{2})
  - Water: 0.054 sq mi (0.14 km^{2})
- Elevation: 1,322 ft (403 m)

Population (2020)
  - Total: 84
  - Density: 88.1/sq mi (34.01/km^{2})
- Time zone: UTC-6 (Central (CST))
  - Summer (DST): UTC-5 (CDT)
- Area code: 218
- FIPS code: 27-46294
- GNIS feature ID: 2395236

Nimrod is a city in Wadena County, Minnesota, United States. As of the 2020 census, Nimrod had a population of 84. making it one of the smallest incorporated towns in Minnesota, though it is included on most major maps. Nimrod was incorporated as a city in 1946. The town is named after the Biblical Nimrod.

Minnesota State Highway 227 has its eastern terminus in Nimrod, having travelled 11 miles from Sebeka, the western terminus.

== History ==
Nimrod began as a halfway point for wheat traders traveling on the Wheat Trail between Shell City and the nearest railroad at Verndale. Nimrod was incorporated as a village in 1924 and as a city in 1946.

== Geography ==
According to the United States Census Bureau, the city has a total area of 0.97 square miles (2.51 km^{2}); 0.92 square miles (2.38 km^{2}) is land and 0.05 square miles (0.13 km^{2}) is water.

Nimrod's city park is named Stigman's Mound, for Dick Stigman, relief pitcher on the 1965 American League Championship-winning Minnesota Twins, who was born in Nimrod. Stigman's Mound is located astride the Crow Wing River, a tributary of the Mississippi River, and is a key rest stop for the many canoe enthusiasts who ply the scenic river.

== Celebration ==
Every year, during Labor Day weekend, the Nimrod Booster Club puts on "The Nimrod Jubilee Days" celebration. Many big name bands, softball tournament, bull bash and mud races are highlight events of this celebration. The event has been held each year since its 1979 centennial celebration.

== Demographics ==
Historical population
Census	Pop.	Note	%±
1950	112		—
1960	60		−46.4%
1970	64		6.7%
1980	69		7.8%
1990	65		−5.8%
2000	75		15.4%
2010	69		−8.0%
2020	84		21.7%
U.S. Decennial Census

=== 2010 census ===
As of the census of 2010, there were 69 people, 34 households, and 19 families residing in the city. The population density was 75.0 inhabitants per square mile (29.0/km^{2}). There were 49 housing units at an average density of 53.3 per square mile (20.6/km^{2}). The racial makeup of the city was 100.0% White.

There were 34 households, of which 14.7% had children under the age of 18 living with them, 44.1% were married couples living together, 8.8% had a female householder with no husband present, 2.9% had a male householder with no wife present, and 44.1% were non-families. 35.3% of all households were made up of individuals, and 14.7% had someone living alone who was 65 years of age or older. The average household size was 2.03 and the average family size was 2.63.

The median age in the city was 51.8 years. 15.9% of residents were under the age of 18; 5.8% were between the ages of 18 and 24; 20.2% were from 25 to 44; 33.2% were from 45 to 64; and 24.6% were 65 years of age or older. The gender makeup of the city was 39.1% male and 60.9% female.

=== 2000 census ===
As of the census of 2000, there were 75 people, 35 households, and 17 families residing in the city. The population density was 80.7 inhabitants per square mile (31.2/km^{2}). There were 47 housing units at an average density of 50.6 per square mile (19.5/km^{2}). The racial makeup of the city was 100.00% White. 25.0% were of American, 25.0% German, 14.3% Norwegian, 11.9% Irish and 9.5% Finnish ancestry.

There were 35 households, out of which 17.1% had children under the age of 18 living with them, 45.7% were married couples living together, 5.7% had a female householder with no husband present, and 48.6% were non-families. 34.3% of all households were made up of individuals, and 11.4% had someone living alone who was 65 years of age or older. The average household size was 2.14 and the average family size was 2.78.

In the city, the population was spread out, with 17.3% under the age of 18, 8.0% from 18 to 24, 24.0% from 25 to 44, 30.7% from 45 to 64, and 20.0% who were 65 years of age or older. The median age was 48 years. For every 100 females, there were 87.5 males. For every 100 females age 18 and over, there were 93.8 males.

The median income for a household in the city was $30,313, and the median income for a family was $46,250. Males had a median income of $28,750 versus $19,375 for females. The per capita income for the city was $15,413. There were no families and 6.8% of the population living below the poverty line, including no under eighteens and 11.8% of those over 64.

== Notable people ==
- Dick Stigman, baseball player.
- Jeff Graba, D1 gymnastics coach.
- Jess Graba, Olympic gymnastics coach.
