= Aldrich Township, Wadena County, Minnesota =

Aldrich Township, Minnesota
- Township
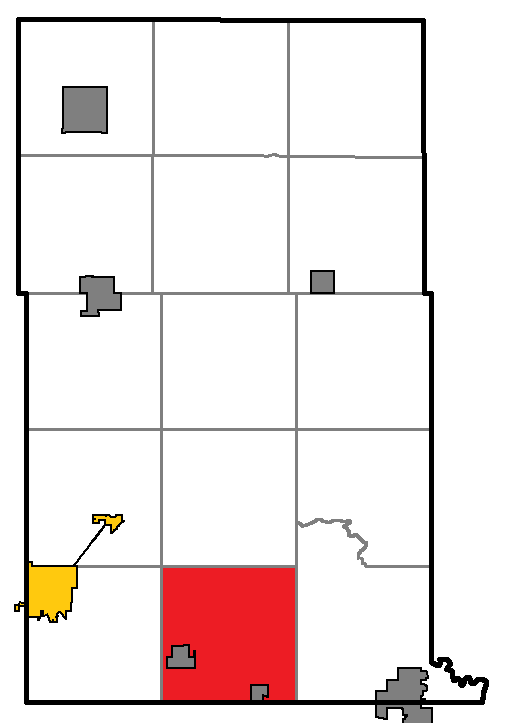
- Location of Aldrich Township, within Wadena County, Minnesota
- Coordinates: 46°24′4″N 94°57′52″W
- Country: United States
- State: Minnesota
- County: Wadena

Area
  - Total: 34.5 sq mi (89.3 km^{2})
  - Land: 34.5 sq mi (89.3 km^{2})
  - Water: 0 sq mi (0.0 km^{2})
- Elevation: 1,332 ft (406 m)

Population (2020)
  - Total: 452
  - Density: 13.1/sq mi (5.06/km^{2})
- Time zone: UTC-6 (Central (CST))
  - Summer (DST): UTC-5 (CDT)
- ZIP code: 56434
- Area code: 218
- FIPS code: 27-00910
- GNIS feature ID: 0663411

Aldrich Township (/ˈɔːldrɪtʃ/ AWL-dritch) is a township in Wadena County, Minnesota, United States. The population was 452 at the 2020 census.

== History ==
Aldrich Township was named after Aldrich, Minnesota.

== Geography ==
According to the United States Census Bureau, the township has a total area of 34.5 square miles (89 km^{2}), all of it land.

== Demographics ==
As of the census of 2000, there were 418 people, 151 households, and 117 families residing in the township. The population density was 12.1 people per square mile (4.7/km^{2}). There were 164 housing units at an average density of 4.8/sq mi (1.8/km^{2}). The racial makeup of the township was 97.37% White, 0.24% Native American, 1.20% from other races, and 1.20% from two or more races. Hispanic or Latino of any race were 2.15% of the population.

There were 151 households, out of which 39.1% had children under the age of 18 living with them, 70.9% were married couples living together, 2.6% had a female householder with no husband present, and 22.5% were non-families. 20.5% of all households were made up of individuals, and 8.6% had someone living alone who was 65 years of age or older. The average household size was 2.77 and the average family size was 3.15.

In the township the population was spread out, with 29.7% under the age of 18, 7.2% from 18 to 24, 25.4% from 25 to 44, 26.6% from 45 to 64, and 11.2% who were 65 years of age or older. The median age was 38 years. For every 100 females, there were 115.5 males. For every 100 females age 18 and over, there were 114.6 males.

The median income for a household in the township was $33,000, and the median income for a family was $34,531. Males had a median income of $26,563 versus $19,250 for females. The per capita income for the township was $13,335. About 8.6% of families and 7.7% of the population were below the poverty line, including 4.5% of those under age 18 and 7.0% of those age 65 or over.
