= Wadena =

Wadena may refer to:

== People ==
- Chip Wadena. American, Ojibwe tribal executive

== Locations ==
United States

- Wadena, Indiana
- Wadena, Iowa
- Wadena, Minnesota
- Wadena Township, Minnesota

Canada

- Wadena, Saskatchewan
- Wadena (electoral district), a former provincial electoral district in Saskatchewan

== Other uses ==
- USS Wadena (SP-158), a steam yacht that served in the U.S. Navy in World War I
