= Shell River =

Shell River may refer to:

== Rivers ==
- Shell River (Minnesota)
- Shell River (Saskatchewan), formerly known as Shell Brook
- Shell River (Assiniboine River tributary)
- Musselshell River, Montana, also known as Shell River

== Places ==
- Rural Municipality of Shell River, Manitoba, Canada
- Shell River Township, Minnesota
