= Oylen, Minnesota =

Oylen
- Unincorporated community
- Location within Minnesota Location within the United States
- Coordinates: 46°34′29″N 94°47′55″W
- Country: United States
- State: Minnesota
- County: Wadena
- Elevation: 1,306 ft (398 m)
- Time zone: UTC-6 (Central (CST))
  - Summer (DST): UTC-5 (CDT)
- Area code: 218
- GNIS feature ID: 649106

Oylen is an unincorporated community in Lyons Township, Wadena County, Minnesota, United States.
