= Redeye River =

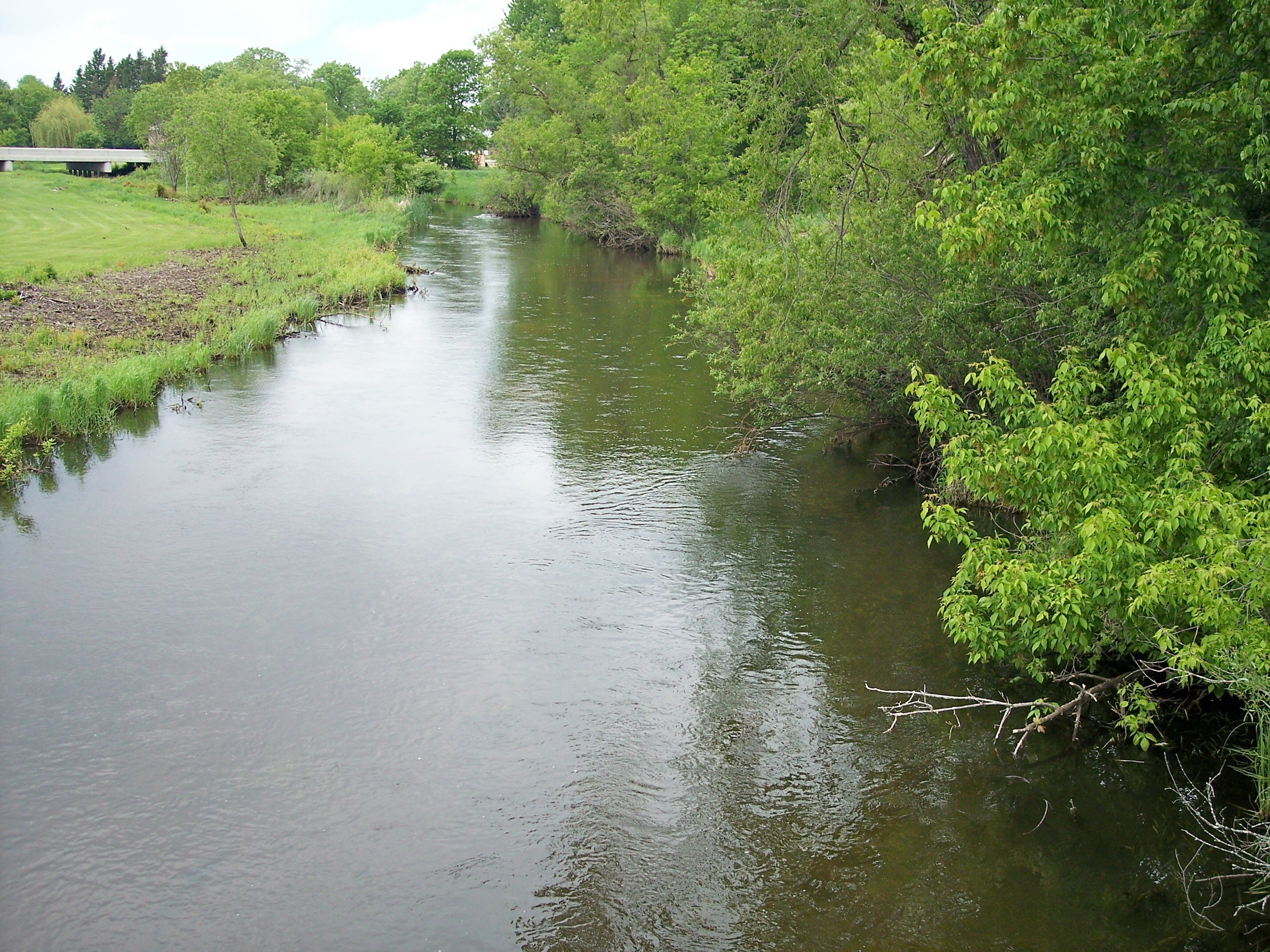
- The Redeye River in Sebeka in 2007

- Location of the mouth of the Redeye River

Location
- Country: United States
- State: Minnesota

Physical characteristics
- Source: Wolf Lake
  - location: Toad Lake Township, Becker County
  - coordinates: 46°49′17″N 95°25′06″W
  - elevation: 1,532 ft (467 m)
- Mouth: Leaf River
  - location: Bullard Township, Wadena County
  - coordinates: 46°29′10″N 94°53′06″W
  - elevation: 1,263 ft (385 m)
- Length: 73 mi (117 km)
- Basin size: 222 sq mi (570 km^{2})

The Redeye River is a tributary of the Leaf River, 73 miles (117 km) long, in central Minnesota in the United States. Via the Leaf and Crow Wing Rivers, it is part of the watershed of the Mississippi River, draining an area of 222 square miles (570 km^{2}) in a rural region. The river's name comes from the Native Americans of the area, who saw many red-eye fish in the river.

== Geography ==
The Redeye River rises in a morainic region, issuing from Wolf Lake in Toad Lake Township in southeastern Becker County. It flows generally southeastwardly through northeastern Otter Tail and central Wadena Counties, through the city of Sebeka, and enters the Leaf River in Bullard Township in southeastern Wadena County, eight miles (13 km) upstream of the Leaf River's mouth at the Crow Wing River. The river's course is within the North Central Hardwood Forest ecoregion, which is characterized by hardwood forests of maple and basswood mixed with conifers, on outwash plains and moraines amid flat glacial lakes.

== See also ==
- List of rivers in Minnesota
