= Huntersville, Minnesota =

Huntersville
- Unincorporated community
- Location within Minnesota Location within the United States
- Coordinates: 46°46′33″N 94°53′34″W
- Country: United States
- State: Minnesota
- County: Wadena
- Elevation: 1,388 ft (423 m)
- Time zone: UTC-6 (Central (CST))
  - Summer (DST): UTC-5 (CDT)
- Area code: 218
- GNIS feature ID: 654760

Huntersville is an unincorporated community in Huntersville Township, Wadena County, Minnesota, United States.
