= Sebeka, Minnesota =

City in Minnesota, United States

Sebeka
- City
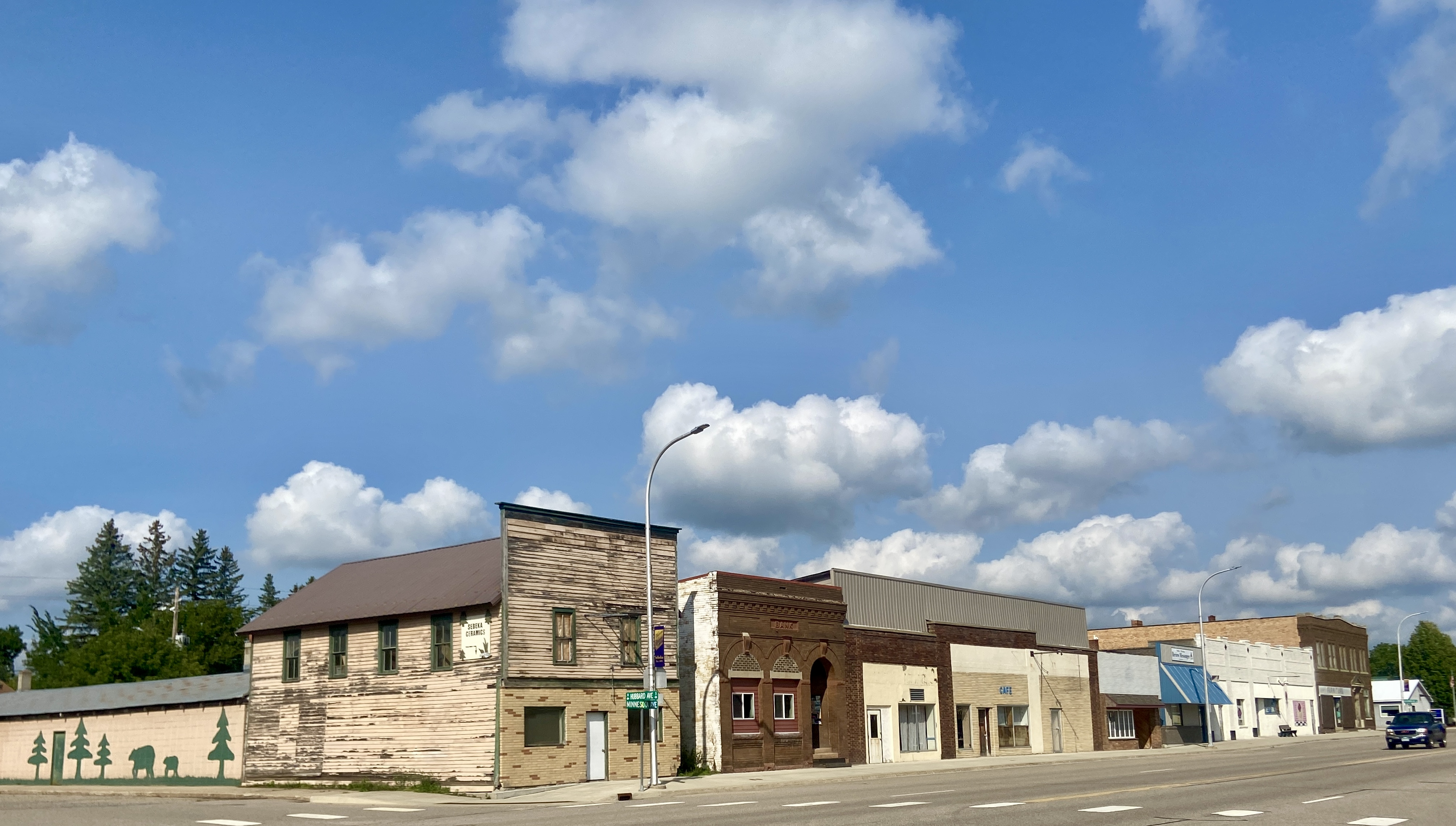
- Buildings on Sebeka's main street, Minnesota Avenue.
- Motto: Small enough to know you, large enough to serve you.
- Location of Sebeka, Minnesota
- Coordinates: 46°37′42″N 95°05′16″W
- Country: United States
- State: Minnesota
- County: Wadena
- Incorporated: March 19, 1898

Government
  - Mayor: David Anderson

Area
  - Total: 2.47 sq mi (6.40 km^{2})
  - Land: 2.47 sq mi (6.40 km^{2})
  - Water: 0 sq mi (0.00 km^{2})
- Elevation: 1,385 ft (422 m)

Population (2020)
  - Total: 741
  - Density: 299.6/sq mi (115.69/km^{2})
- Time zone: UTC-6 (Central (CST))
  - Summer (DST): UTC-5 (CDT)
- ZIP code: 56477
- Area code: 218
- FIPS code: 27-59152
- GNIS feature ID: 2396566
- Website: http://www.cityofsebeka.org/

Sebeka (/səˈbiːkə/ sə-BEE-kə) is a city in Wadena County, Minnesota, United States. As of the 2020 census, Sebeka had a population of 741. The name comes from an Ojibwe word meaning "town by the water".

U.S. Highway 71, State Highway 227, and the historic Jefferson Highway (now Jefferson Avenue), are three of the main routes in the city.

== History ==
Sebeka originally grew around the depot of the K-line branch of the Great Northern Railway, which first came through the area in 1892. The first major industry in the area was logging. The town's first store was the Anderson Pioneer Store. The town was incorporated on March 19, 1898. Its population has gone from 233 in 1900 to a peak of 818 in 1960.

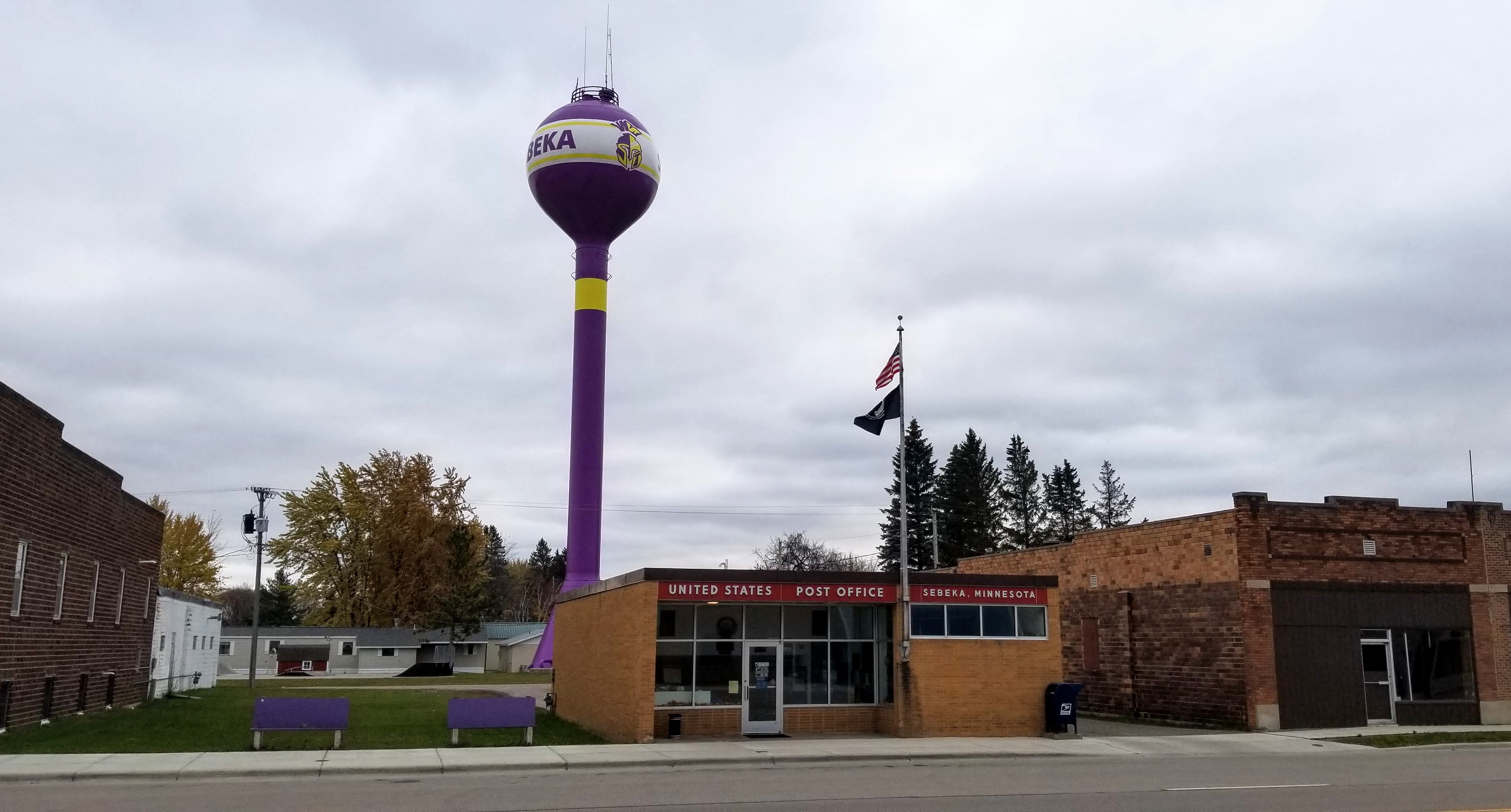
Sebeka post office.

=== Point of interest ===
In the Sebeka High School building is a mural, painted in 1938, by artist Richard Haines that demonstrates the casein paint process as used in fresco-painting. Murals were produced from 1934 to 1943 in the United States through the Section of Painting and Sculpture, later called the Section of Fine Arts, of the Treasury Department.

== Geography ==
According to the United States Census Bureau, the city has a total area of 2.47 square miles (6.40 km^{2}), all of it land.

The Redeye River flows through the city.

== Demographics ==
Historical population
Census	Pop.	Note	%±
1900	223		—
1910	428		91.9%
1920	585		36.7%
1930	548		−6.3%
1940	648		18.2%
1950	802		23.8%
1960	823		2.6%
1970	668		−18.8%
1980	774		15.9%
1990	662		−14.5%
2000	710		7.3%
2010	711		0.1%
2020	741		4.2%
U.S. Decennial Census

=== 2010 census ===
As of the census of 2010, there were 711 people, 321 households, and 182 families residing in the city. The population density was 287.9 inhabitants per square mile (111.2/km^{2}). There were 364 housing units at an average density of 147.4 per square mile (56.9/km^{2}). The racial makeup of the city was 97.9% White, 0.4% African American, 0.1% Native American, and 1.5% from two or more races. Hispanic or Latino of any race were 0.8% of the population.

There were 321 households, of which 27.4% had children under the age of 18 living with them, 40.5% were married couples living together, 10.9% had a female householder with no husband present, 5.3% had a male householder with no wife present, and 43.3% were non-families. 38.9% of all households were made up of individuals, and 19.3% had someone living alone who was 65 years of age or older. The average household size was 2.21 and the average family size was 2.96.

The median age in the city was 38.3 years. 26.2% of residents were under the age of 18; 6.7% were between the ages of 18 and 24; 23.3% were from 25 to 44; 23.1% were from 45 to 64; and 20.7% were 65 years of age or older. The gender makeup of the city was 47.8% male and 52.2% female.

=== 2000 census ===
As of the census of 2000, there were 710 people, 332 households, and 188 families residing in the city. The population density was 289.1 inhabitants per square mile (111.6/km^{2}). There were 378 housing units at an average density of 153.9 per square mile (59.4/km^{2}). The racial makeup of the city was 99.01% White, 0.14% African American, 0.28% Native American, and 0.56% from two or more races. Hispanic or Latino of any race were 2.54% of the population. 30.1% were of Finnish, 28.2% German, 9.2% Norwegian and 7.6% American ancestry.

There were 332 households, out of which 26.2% had children under the age of 18 living with them, 45.5% were married couples living together, 8.4% had a female householder with no husband present, and 43.1% were non-families. 40.7% of all households were made up of individuals, and 25.0% had someone living alone who was 65 years of age or older. The average household size was 2.13 and the average family size was 2.86.

In the city, the population was spread out, with 23.9% under the age of 18, 8.3% from 18 to 24, 23.0% from 25 to 44, 19.9% from 45 to 64, and 24.9% who were 65 years of age or older. The median age was 41 years. For every 100 females, there were 88.3 males. For every 100 females age 18 and over, there were 82.4 males.

The median income for a household in the city was $23,693, and the median income for a family was $36,429. Males had a median income of $27,115 versus $19,531 for females. The per capita income for the city was $14,933. About 11.7% of families and 17.8% of the population were below the poverty line, including 20.6% of those under age 18 and 20.2% of those age 65 or over.

== Notable people ==
- Kenneth Arnold, a pilot who reported a widely covered UFO sighting, was born in Sebeka.
- Carrie Lee, named Miss Minnesota USA in 2005, is a native of Sebeka.
- Dick Stigman, a Major League Baseball player, attended and graduated from Sebeka High School.
- Patrick Volkerding, founder and maintainer of Slackware, has been a resident of Sebeka since 2005.

== Radio stations ==
FM radio

- 92.5 KXKK 92.5 Hot Country
- 94.5 KDLB Adult Contemporary The Arrow 94.7
- 97.5 KDKK 97.5 Music of Your Life
- 101.9 KQKK Adult Contemporary, KQ102
- 105.9 KKWS Country SuperStation K106

AM radio

- 870 KPRM Classic Country News/Talk
- 1070 KSKK Country, 10,000 Watts
- 1570 KAKK Oldies 1570, 10,000 Watts

== Gallery ==
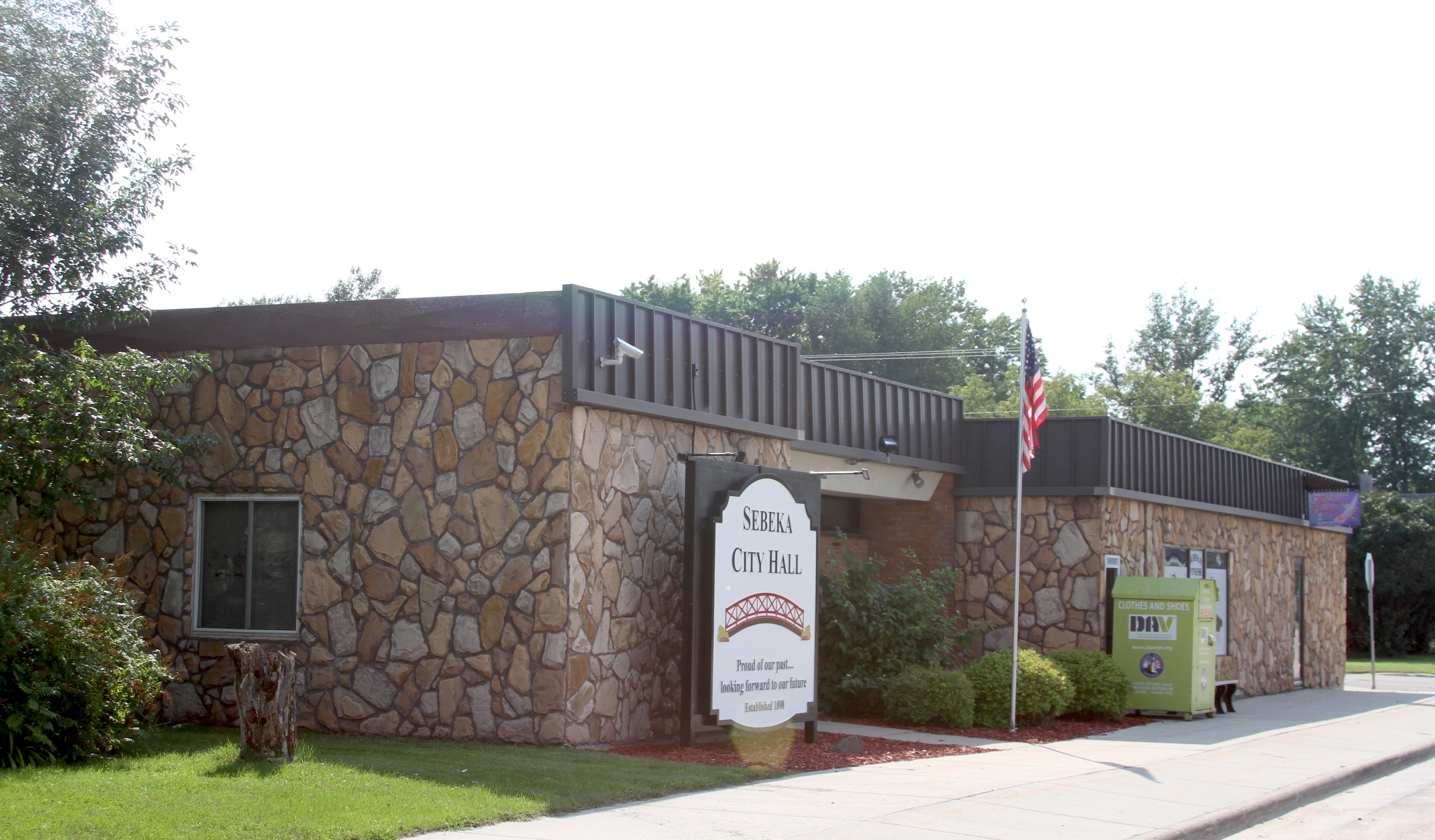
City Hall

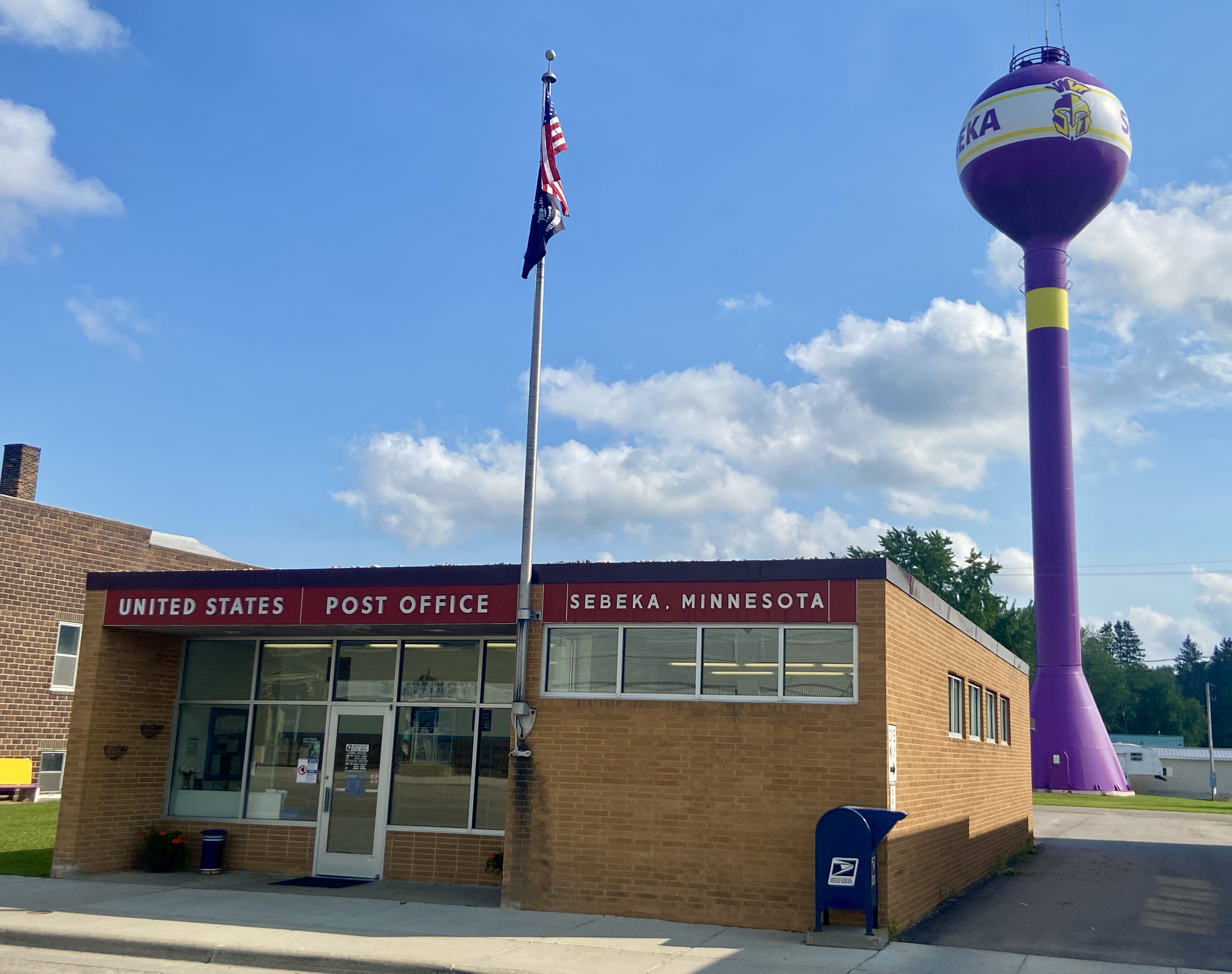
Post Office

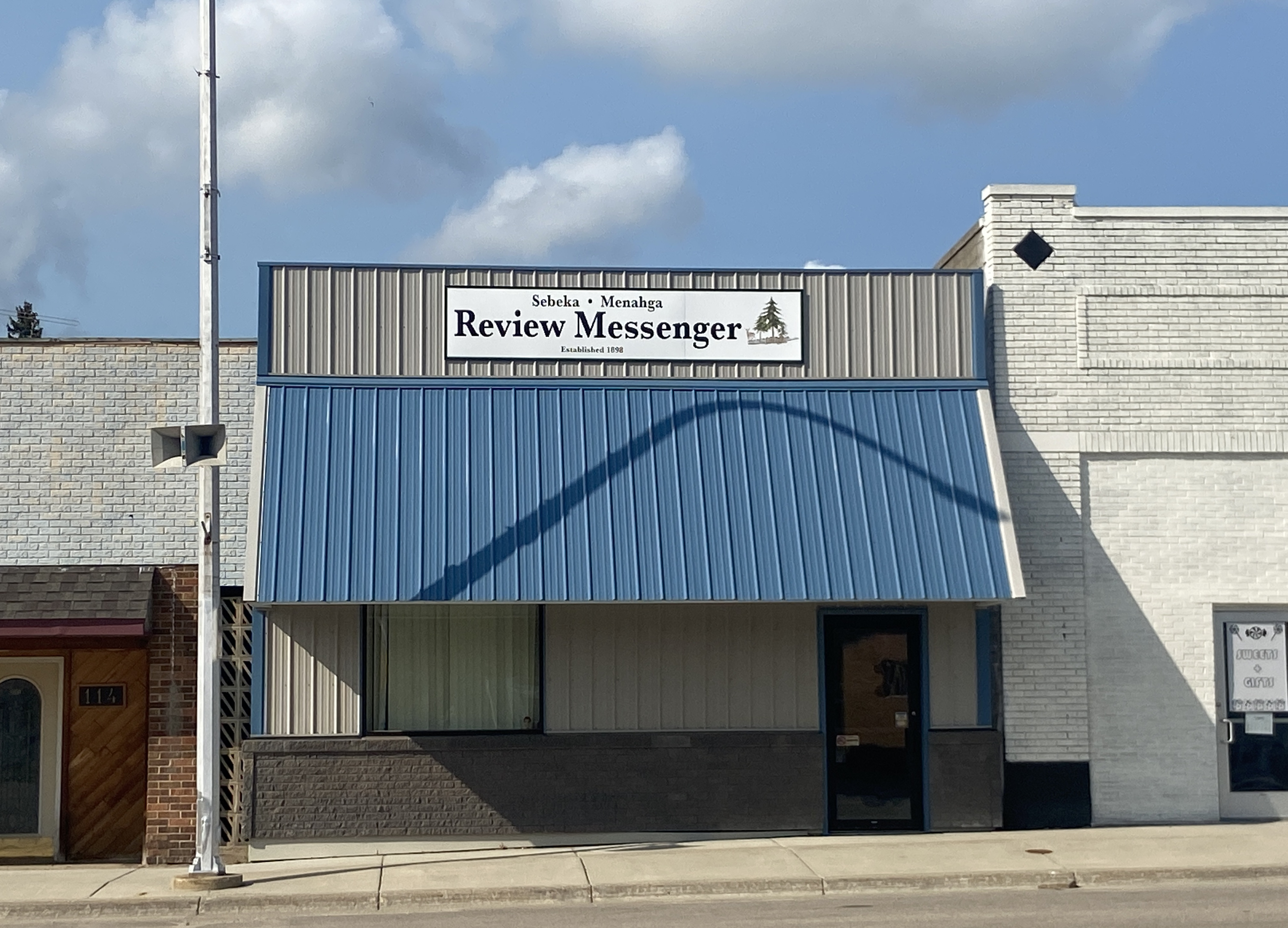
Sebeka - Menahga Review Messenger Newspaper building

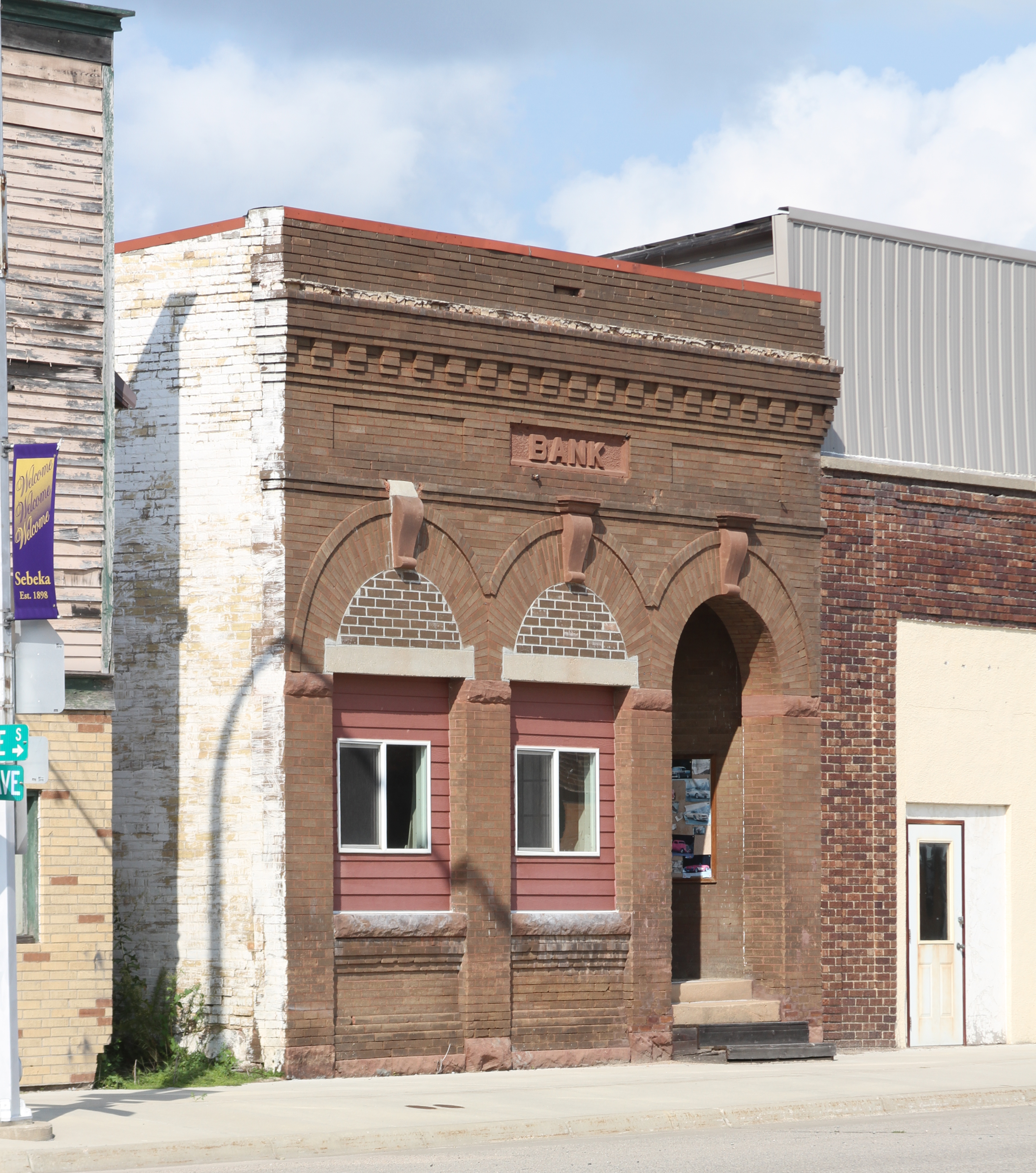
Former bank building

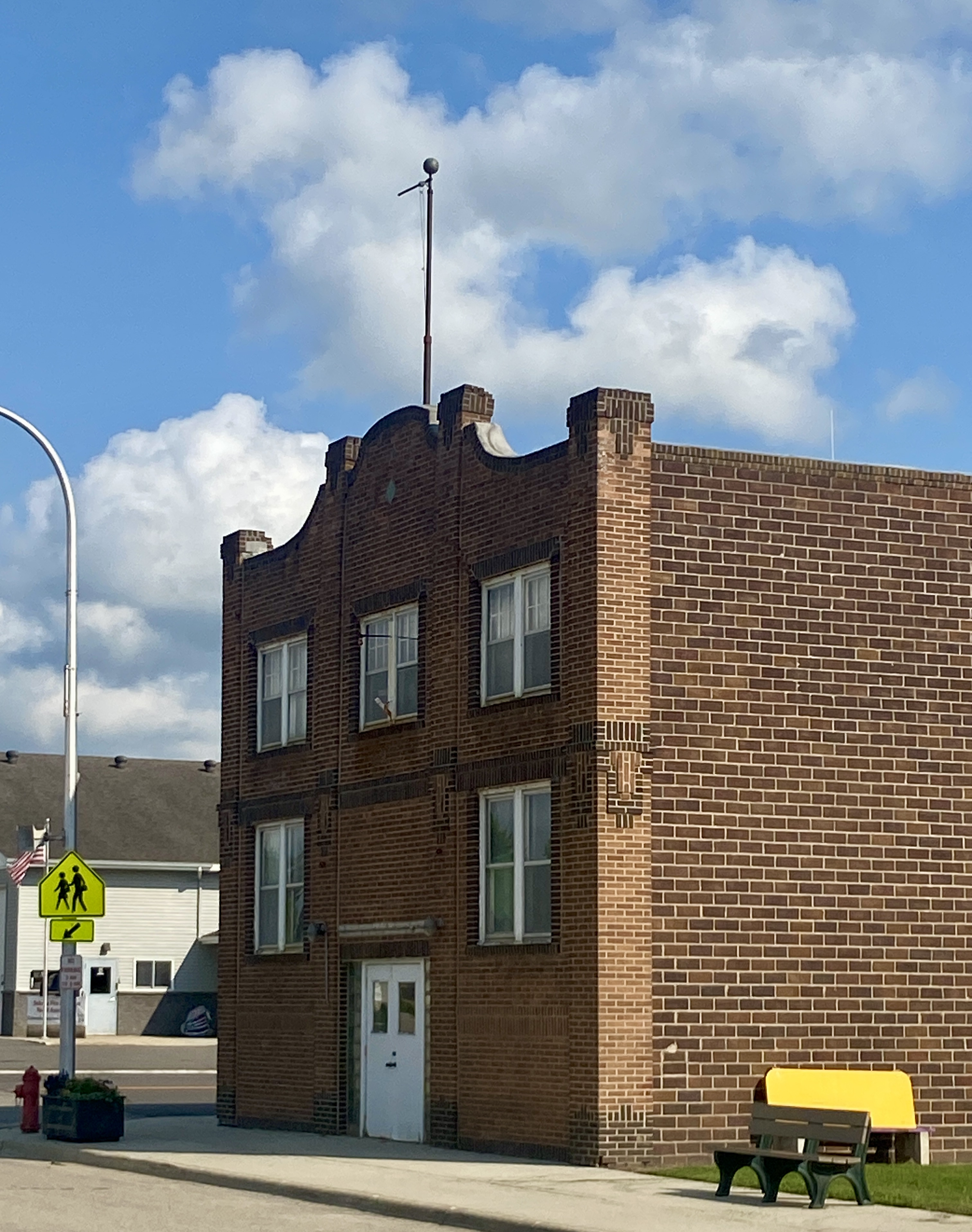
Former Fire House
