= Crow Wing Chain of Lakes =

Chain of lakes in Minnesota, U.S.

The Crow Wing Chain of Lakes is a chain of eleven shallow lakes along the Crow Wing River in Hubbard County, Minnesota, approximately 90 miles (140 km) upstream from the Crow Wing's confluence with the Mississippi River. Although connected, there are a few dams between a few of the lakes that are impossible to traverse via motorboats, although they are able to be crossed in canoe.

== Lakes ==
Name	Coordinates	Area	Maximum depth
First Crow Wing	46°50′06″N 94°50′32″W	519.85 acres (210 ha)	15 feet (4.6 m)
Second Crow Wing	46°50′20″N 94°52′30″W	216.23 acres (87.5 ha)	35 feet (11 m)
Third Crow Wing	46°51′42″N 94°51′29″W	635.32 acres (257 ha)	35 feet (11 m)
Fourth Crow Wing	46°52′36″N 94°51′39″W	440.41 acres (178 ha)	10 feet (3.0 m)
Fifth Crow Wing	46°55′19″N 94°53′15″W	400.11 acres (162 ha)	35 feet (11 m)
Sixth Crow Wing	46°55′44″N 94°51′53″W	339.58 acres (137 ha)	40 feet (12 m)
Seventh Crow Wing	46°56′42″N 94°49′41″W	258.72 acres (105 ha)	42 feet (13 m)
Eighth Crow Wing	46°57′36″N 94°47′44″W	493.19 acres (200 ha)	30 feet (9.1 m)
Ninth Crow Wing	46°58′40″N 94°46′09″W	223.69 acres (90.5 ha)	65 feet (20 m)
Tenth Crow Wing	46°59′18″N 94°45′22″W	175.2 acres (70.9 ha)	40 feet (12 m)
Eleventh Crow Wing	47°00′53″N 94°43′29″W	752.45 acres (305 ha)	80 feet (24 m)
