= Huntersville State Forest =

State Forest in Wadena County, Minnesota

- Location within Minnesota
- Interactive map of Huntersville State Forest

Geography
- Location: Wadena, Minnesota, United States
- Coordinates: 46°26′07″N 94°30′18″W
- Elevation: 1,371 feet (418 m)
- Area: 33,963 acres (13,744 ha)

Administration
- Established: 1963
- Authority: Minnesota DNR, private
- Website: www.dnr.state.mn.us/state_forests/sft00025/index.html

Ecology
- WWF Classification: Western Great Lakes Forests
- EPA Classification: Northern Lakes and Forests
- Disturbance: Wildfire
- Dominant tree species: Pinus banksiana, Pinus resinosa

The Huntersville State Forest is a state forest located in Wadena County, Minnesota. Around half of the forest is managed by the Minnesota Department of Natural Resources, with the other half controlled privately.

== History ==
The history of the forest mirrors that of the majority of northern Minnesota. The area was inhabited by the Ojibwe and the Dakota prior to European settlement. The French fur traders were the first Europeans to arrive to the area in the early eighteenth century, and controlled the fur trade until the 1760s, when British and Canadians came to dominate. The land was extensively logged at the end of the nineteenth century and into the early twentieth century. Shell City, now a ghost town, was established as a logging camp in 1879. The Shell City Navigation Company operated steamboats and barges on the Crow Wing River and Shell River, which traverse the forest, to transport logs to the Mississippi River. Logging in the area became more extensive with the arrival of the railroads, and finally tapered off with the disappearance of old-growth forests at the end of the nineteenth century.

== Flora and fauna ==
At present, the forest consists largely of Red pine and Jack pine on the loamy sand upland sites, although aspen and paper birch are not uncommon. The abundance of pine on upland sites make dangerous wildfires highly probable during the fire season. Fire lookout towers and airplanes are used for early detection during especially dry periods conducive to wildfire.

== Recreation ==
The forest's camping facilities are an alternative to the highly visited Itasca State Park, located nearby. Other outdoor recreational activities include swimming, boating, canoeing, and kayaking on the Crow Wing and Shell Rivers. Hiking and cross-country skiing have designated trails within the forest, as well as 18 miles (29 km) designated for horseback riding, 3.6 miles (5.8 km) available for Class I and II all-terrain vehicle use, and 58 miles (93 km) for dirt biking.

== See also ==
- List of Minnesota state forests
