= Red Eye Township, Wadena County, Minnesota =

Red Eye Township, Minnesota
- Township
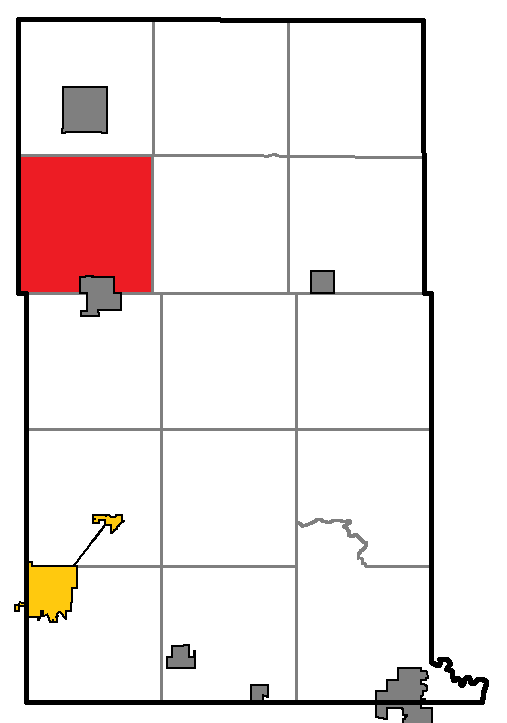
- Location of Red Eye Township, within Wadena County, Minnesota
- Coordinates: 46°40′46″N 95°5′43″W
- Country: United States
- State: Minnesota
- County: Wadena

Area
  - Total: 35.1 sq mi (91.0 km^{2})
  - Land: 35.1 sq mi (90.8 km^{2})
  - Water: 0.077 sq mi (0.2 km^{2})
- Elevation: 1,385 ft (422 m)

Population (2020)
  - Total: 506
  - Density: 14.4/sq mi (5.57/km^{2})
- Time zone: UTC-6 (Central (CST))
  - Summer (DST): UTC-5 (CDT)
- FIPS code: 27-53422
- GNIS feature ID: 0665384

Red Eye Township is a township in Wadena County, Minnesota, United States. The population was 506 at the 2020 census.

Red Eye Township was named after the Redeye River.

== Geography ==
According to the United States Census Bureau, the township has a total area of 35.1 square miles (91.0 km^{2}); 35.1 square miles (90.8 km^{2}) of it is land and 0.1 square miles (0.2 km^{2}) of it (0.17%) is water. The Redeye River flows through the southwestern part of the township.

== Demographics ==
As of the census of 2000, there were 421 people, 146 households, and 122 families residing in the township. The population density was 12.0 people per square mile (4.6/km^{2}). There were 172 housing units at an average density of 4.9/sq mi (1.9/km^{2}). The racial makeup of the township was 99.29% White and 0.71% Asian.

There were 146 households, out of which 39.7% had children under the age of 18 living with them, 69.9% were married couples living together, 7.5% had a female householder with no husband present, and 15.8% were non-families. 13.7% of all households were made up of individuals, and 5.5% had someone living alone who was 65 years of age or older. The average household size was 2.88 and the average family size was 3.15.

In the township the population was spread out, with 31.4% under the age of 18, 5.2% from 18 to 24, 27.6% from 25 to 44, 24.9% from 45 to 64, and 10.9% who were 65 years of age or older. The median age was 37 years. For every 100 females, there were 119.3 males. For every 100 females age 18 and over, there were 122.3 males.

The median income for a household in the township was $37,500, and the median income for a family was $40,481. Males had a median income of $27,171 versus $23,333 for females. The per capita income for the township was $15,184. About 4.9% of families and 8.8% of the population were below the poverty line, including 12.1% of those under age 18 and 13.7% of those age 65 or over.
