= Blue Grass, Minnesota =

Blue Grass
- Unincorporated community
- Location within Minnesota Location within the United States
- Coordinates: 46°32′34″N 95°00′36″W
- Country: United States
- State: Minnesota
- County: Wadena
- Elevation: 1,355 ft (413 m)
- Time zone: UTC-6 (Central (CST))
  - Summer (DST): UTC-5 (CDT)
- Area code: 218
- GNIS feature ID: 640286

Blue Grass is an unincorporated community in Wadena County, Minnesota, United States.
