= Bullard Township, Wadena County, Minnesota =

Bullard Township, Minnesota
- Township
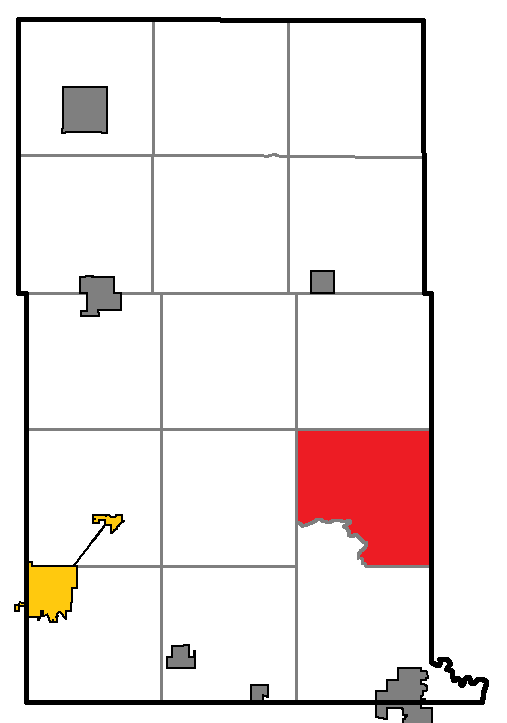
- Location of Bullard Township, within Wadena County, Minnesota
- Coordinates: 46°29′18″N 94°50′13″W
- Country: United States
- State: Minnesota
- County: Wadena

Area
  - Total: 31.0 sq mi (80.3 km^{2})
  - Land: 30.3 sq mi (78.5 km^{2})
  - Water: 0.73 sq mi (1.9 km^{2})
- Elevation: 1,270 ft (387 m)

Population (2020)
  - Total: 190
  - Density: 6.3/sq mi (2.4/km^{2})
- Time zone: UTC-6 (Central (CST))
  - Summer (DST): UTC-5 (CDT)
- FIPS code: 27-08542
- GNIS feature ID: 0663700

Bullard Township is a township in Wadena County, Minnesota, United States. The population was 190 at the 2020 census.

Bullard Township was named after Clarence Eugene Bullard, a county official.

== Geography ==
According to the United States Census Bureau, the township has a total area of 31.0 square miles (80 km^{2}); 30.3 square miles (78 km^{2}) of it is land and 0.7 square miles (1.8 km^{2}) of it (2.32%) is water.

== Demographics ==
As of the census of 2000, there were 207 people, 79 households, and 50 families residing in the township. The population density was 6.8 inhabitants per square mile (2.6/km^{2}). There were 151 housing units at an average density of 5.0 per square mile (1.9/km^{2}). The racial makeup of the township was 96.14% White, 2.42% Native American, 0.97% from other races, and 0.48% from two or more races. Hispanic or Latino of any race were 1.45% of the population.

There were 79 households, out of which 34.2% had children under the age of 18 living with them, 45.6% were married couples living together, 11.4% had a female householder with no husband present, and 36.7% were non-families. 32.9% of all households were made up of individuals, and 8.9% had someone living alone who was 65 years of age or older. The average household size was 2.62 and the average family size was 3.36.

In the township the population was spread out, with 33.8% under the age of 18, 7.7% from 18 to 24, 23.7% from 25 to 44, 25.6% from 45 to 64, and 9.2% who were 65 years of age or older. The median age was 34 years. For every 100 females, there were 115.6 males. For every 100 females age 18 and over, there were 121.0 males.

The median income for a household in the township was $23,125, and the median income for a family was $33,750. Males had a median income of $33,125 versus $17,083 for females. The per capita income for the township was $9,559. About 15.0% of families and 19.2% of the population were below the poverty line, including 16.5% of those under the age of eighteen and 18.2% of those 65 or over.
