= Meadow Township, Wadena County, Minnesota =

Meadow Township, Minnesota
- Township
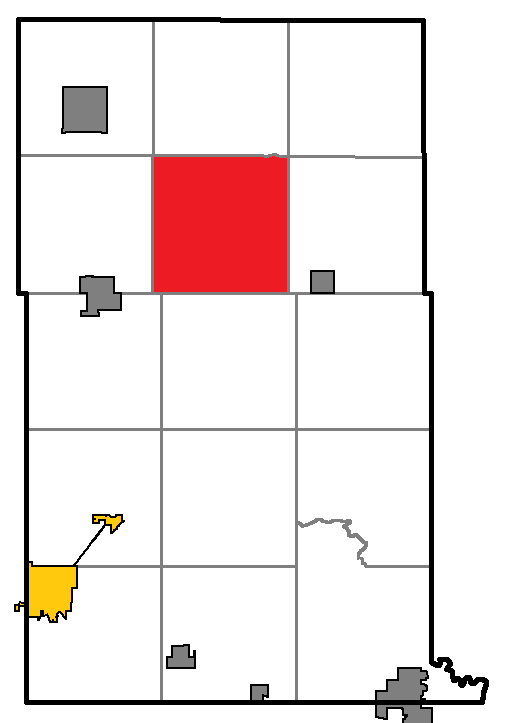
- Location of Meadow Township, within Wadena County, Minnesota
- Coordinates: 46°41′0″N 94°57′57″W
- Country: United States
- State: Minnesota
- County: Wadena

Area
  - Total: 36.5 sq mi (94.5 km^{2})
  - Land: 35.9 sq mi (93.0 km^{2})
  - Water: 0.58 sq mi (1.5 km^{2})
- Elevation: 1,362 ft (415 m)

Population (2020)
  - Total: 216
  - Density: 6.02/sq mi (2.32/km^{2})
- Time zone: UTC-6 (Central (CST))
  - Summer (DST): UTC-5 (CDT)
- FIPS code: 27-41336
- GNIS feature ID: 0664941

Meadow Township is a township in Wadena County, Minnesota, United States. The population was 216 at the 2020 census.

Meadow Township was named for the prairie within its borders.

== Geography ==
According to the United States Census Bureau, the township has a total area of 36.5 square miles (94.5 km^{2}); 35.9 square miles (93.0 km^{2}) of it is land and 0.6 square miles (1.5 km^{2}) of it (1.59%) is water.

== Demographics ==
As of the census of 2000, there were 228 people, 83 households, and 65 families residing in the township. The population density was 6.4 inhabitants per square mile (2.5/km^{2}). There were 116 housing units at an average density of 3.2 per square mile (1.2/km^{2}). The racial makeup of the township was 99.56% White, and 0.44% from two or more races.

There were 83 households, out of which 32.5% had children under the age of 18 living with them, 71.1% were married couples living together, 8.4% had a female householder with no husband present, and 20.5% were non-families. 13.3% of all households were made up of individuals, and 6.0% had someone living alone who was 65 years of age or older. The average household size was 2.75 and the average family size was 3.08.

In the township the population was spread out, with 27.6% under the age of 18, 6.6% from 18 to 24, 24.1% from 25 to 44, 28.5% from 45 to 64, and 13.2% who were 65 years of age or older. The median age was 38 years. For every 100 females, there were 96.6 males. For every 100 females age 18 and over, there were 101.2 males.

The median income for a household in the township was $34,500, and the median income for a family was $39,583. Males had a median income of $21,771 versus $19,000 for females. The per capita income for the township was $12,844. About 11.6% of families and 11.9% of the population were below the poverty line, including 8.1% of those under the age of eighteen and 38.1% of those 65 or over.
