= Dick Stigman =

American baseball player (born 1936)

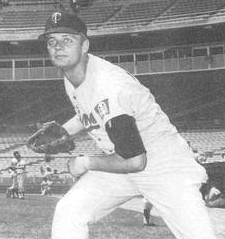
- Pitcher
- Born: January 24, 1936 (age 89); Nimrod, Minnesota, U.S.
- Batted: Right Threw: Left

MLB debut
- April 22, 1960, for the Cleveland Indians

Last MLB appearance
- September 10, 1966, for the Boston Red Sox

MLB statistics
- Win–loss record: 46–54
- Earned run average: 4.03
- Strikeouts: 755
- Stats at Baseball Reference

Teams
- Cleveland Indians (1960–1961); Minnesota Twins (1962–1965); Boston Red Sox (1966)

Career highlights and awards
- 2× All-Star (1960, 1960²)

Richard Lewis Stigman (born January 24, 1936) is an American former professional baseball player, a left-handed pitcher who appeared in seven Major League seasons (1960–1966) for the Cleveland Indians, Minnesota Twins and Boston Red Sox. Born in Nimrod, Minnesota, he graduated from Sebeka High School. Stigman was listed as 6 feet 3 inches (1.91 m) tall and weighed 200 pounds (91 kg).

Stigman's professional career lasted from 1954 to 1967. In his rookie campaign, 1960 with Cleveland, he had posted a 4–4 win–loss record with three complete games and a 3.32 earned run average through June 30. Surprisingly, he was selected to the American League All-Star team by manager Al López, but he failed to appear in either of that summer's All-Star games (from 1959–1962, two such games were played each year). He spent two full years with the Indians, and then—on the brink of the 1962 season—he was traded to his hometown Twins with first baseman Vic Power for right-handed pitcher Pedro Ramos.

That set the stage for Stigman's two most successful MLB campaigns. In 1962, he helped pitch the Twins to a shocking second-place finish in the American League. He worked in 40 games, alternating between starting and relief, and went 12–5 (3.66) with six complete games in 15 starts and three saves out of the bullpen. Then, in 1963, Stigman took a regular turn in the Minnesota rotation, making 33 starts and working in 241 innings pitched. Although he had only a .500 record (15–15), he threw 15 complete games and three shutouts, posting an ERA of 3.25. All were career bests as the Twins finished third in the league.

But 1964 was a setback for both Stigman and the Twins. He won only six of 21 decisions and his ERA rose to 4.03; the Twins, meanwhile, fell into a tie for sixth place in the AL. It cost Stigman his place in the 1965 Twins' starting rotation, as he reverted to a swing-man role. He went 4–2 (4.37) in 33 games pitched, with eight starts and four saves out of the bullpen. However, he contributed to the Twins' 1965 American League pennant, the club's first title since it moved to Minneapolis–Saint Paul in 1961. Stigman did not appear in the 1965 World Series, won by the Los Angeles Dodgers in seven games.

The following spring, he was traded to the second-division Boston Red Sox, where he closed out his major league career. One of his two victories came on May 31, a 1–0 complete game shutout over the Chicago White Sox in which Stigman scattered seven hits. Boston traded Stigman to the Cincinnati Reds during the off-season, and he pitched one more season of Triple-A before retiring.

In his 235 big-league games pitched, including 119 starts, Stigman posted a 46–54 record. In 9222/3 innings pitched, he surrendered 819 hits and 406 bases on balls; he fanned 755. He had 30 complete games, five shutouts and 16 career saves.

In retirement, he became a businessman in Minneapolis–Saint Paul. In his honor, a park in his home town of Nimrod was named Stigman's Mound. Stigman's Mound is a favorite stop for picnics, launches or finishes by canoe enthusiasts on the adjacent Crow Wing River, a tributary of the Mississippi River.

The Nimrod Gnats, amateur baseball team in Nimrod, named their baseball field after him.
