= Huntersville, Maryland =

Unincorporated community in Maryland, United States

- Unincorporated community
- Location within Maryland
- Coordinates: 38°28′09″N 76°43′49″W
- Country: United States
- State: Maryland
- County: St. Mary's
- Elevation: 171 ft (52 m)
- Time zone: UTC-5 (Eastern (EST))
  - Summer (DST): UTC-4 (EDT)
- Area codes: 301 & 240
- GNIS feature ID: 594761

Huntersville is an unincorporated community in St. Mary's County, Maryland, United States. Huntersville is located along Maryland Route 6, 3 miles (4.8 km) west-southwest of Golden Beach.
