= Wadena Township, Wadena County, Minnesota =

Wadena Township, Minnesota
- Township
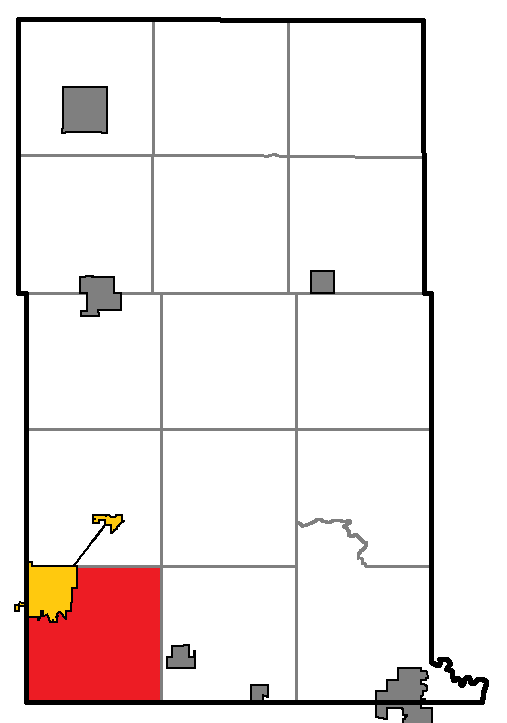
- Location of Wadena Township, within Wadena County, Minnesota
- Coordinates: 46°24′19″N 95°5′36″W
- Country: United States
- State: Minnesota
- County: Wadena

Area
  - Total: 31.4 sq mi (81.4 km^{2})
  - Land: 31.4 sq mi (81.4 km^{2})
  - Water: 0.039 sq mi (0.1 km^{2})
- Elevation: 1,362 ft (415 m)

Population (2020)
  - Total: 907
  - Density: 28.9/sq mi (11.1/km^{2})
- Time zone: UTC-6 (Central (CST))
  - Summer (DST): UTC-5 (CDT)
- ZIP code: 56482
- Area code: 218
- FIPS code: 27-67522
- GNIS feature ID: 0665890

Wadena Township is a township in Wadena County, Minnesota, United States. The population was 907 at the 2020 census.

== Geography ==
According to the United States Census Bureau, the township has a total area of 31.5 square miles (81.5 km^{2}); 31.4 square miles (81.4 km^{2}) of it is land and 0.04 square miles (0.1 km^{2}) of it (0.10%) is water.

== Demographics ==
As of the census of 2000, there were 1,010 people, 346 households, and 286 families residing in the township. The population density was 32.2 inhabitants per square mile (12.4/km^{2}). There were 365 housing units at an average density of 11.6/sq mi (4.5/km^{2}). The racial makeup of the township was 98.71% White, 0.30% African American, 0.59% Native American, and 0.40% from two or more races. Hispanic or Latino of any race were 0.89% of the population.

There were 346 households, out of which 40.8% had children under the age of 18 living with them, 72.8% were married couples living together, 4.3% had a female householder with no husband present, and 17.3% were non-families. 13.0% of all households were made up of individuals, and 6.6% had someone living alone who was 65 years of age or older. The average household size was 2.92 and the average family size was 3.15.

In the township the population was spread out, with 28.9% under the age of 18, 9.0% from 18 to 24, 26.5% from 25 to 44, 24.5% from 45 to 64, and 11.1% who were 65 years of age or older. The median age was 36 years. For every 100 females, there were 106.1 males. For every 100 females age 18 and over, there were 104.6 males.

The median income for a household in the township was $41,250, and the median income for a family was $44,833. Males had a median income of $32,500 versus $21,875 for females. The per capita income for the township was $16,109. About 7.2% of families and 9.0% of the population were below the poverty line, including 11.4% of those under age 18 and 1.8% of those age 65 or over.
