= Aldrich, Minnesota =

City in Minnesota, United States

Aldrich
- City
- Location of Aldrich, Minnesota
- Coordinates: 46°22′29″N 94°56′22″W
- Country: United States
- State: Minnesota
- County: Wadena

Area
  - Total: 0.49 sq mi (1.27 km^{2})
  - Land: 0.49 sq mi (1.27 km^{2})
  - Water: 0 sq mi (0.00 km^{2})
- Elevation: 1,332 ft (406 m)

Population (2020)
  - Total: 35
  - Density: 71.4/sq mi (27.56/km^{2})
- Time zone: UTC-6 (Central (CST))
  - Summer (DST): UTC-5 (CDT)
- ZIP code: 56434
- Area code: 218
- FIPS code: 27-00892
- GNIS feature ID: 2393913

Aldrich (/ˈɔːldrɪtʃ/ AWL-dritch) is a city in Wadena County, Minnesota, United States, along the Partridge River. As of the 2020 census, Aldrich had a population of 35. The small community holds the distinction as the first permanent settlement in Wadena County and the first to establish a post office. It is also home to the first Catholic church in the area, established in 1870, as a mission church.

== History ==
A post office called Aldrich has been in operation since 1877. The city was named for Cyrus Aldrich (1808–1871), a state legislator.

== Geography ==
According to the United States Census Bureau, the city has a total area of 0.47 square miles (1.22 km^{2}), all of it land.

U.S. Route 10 serves as a main route in the community.

== Demographics ==
Historical population
Census	Pop.	Note	%±
1940	152		—
1950	131		−13.8%
1960	90		−31.3%
1970	85		−5.6%
1980	88		3.5%
1990	70		−20.5%
2000	53		−24.3%
2010	48		−9.4%
2020	35		−27.1%
U.S. Decennial Census

=== 2010 census ===
As of the census of 2010, there were 48 people in 24 households, including 11 families, in the city. The population density was 102.1 inhabitants per square mile (39.4/km^{2}). There were 31 housing units at an average density of 66.0 per square mile (25.5/km^{2}). The racial makup of the city was 100.0% White.

Of the 24 households 16.7% had children under the age of 18 living with them, 41.7% were married couples living together, 4.2% had a male householder with no wife present, and 54.2% were non-families. 45.8% of households were one person and 25% were one person aged 65 or older. The average household size was 2.00 and the average family size was 3.00.

The median age was 50.5 years. 12.5% of residents were under the age of 18; 8.5% were between the ages of 18 and 24; 16.7% were from 25 to 44; 37.5% were from 45 to 64; and 25% were 65 or older. The gender makeup of the city was 50.0% male and 50.0% female.

=== 2000 census ===
At the 2000 census there were 53 people in 26 households, including 13 families, in the city. The population density was 111.6 inhabitants per square mile (43.1/km^{2}). There were 31 housing units at an average density of 65.3 per square mile (25.2/km^{2}). The racial makup of the city was 98.11% White, and 1.89% from two or more races. 52.9% were of German, 15.7% Norwegian, 7.8% Swedish and 5.9% Irish ancestry according to Census 2000.

Of the 26 households 19.2% had children under the age of 18 living with them, 38.5% were married couples living together, 3.8% had a female householder with no husband present, and 46.2% were non-families. 34.6% of households were one person and 19.2% were one person aged 65 or older. The average household size was 2.04 and the average family size was 2.64.

The age distribution was 17.0% under the age of 18, 13.2% from 18 to 24, 20.8% from 25 to 44, 20.8% from 45 to 64, and 28.3% 65 or older. The median age was 44 years. For every 100 females, there were 103.8 males. For every 100 females age 18 and over, there were 120.0 males.

The median household income was $30,417 and the median family income was $31,500. Males had a median income of $35,000 versus $19,250 for females. The per capita income for the city was $14,598. There were no families and 13.2% of the population living below the poverty line, including no under eighteens and none of those over 64.

== Transportation ==
Amtrak’s Empire Builder, which operates between Seattle/Portland and Chicago, passes through the town on BNSF tracks, but makes no stop. The nearest station is located in Staples, 7 miles (11 km) to the east.
