= Huntersville Township, Wadena County, Minnesota =

Huntersville Township, Minnesota
- Township
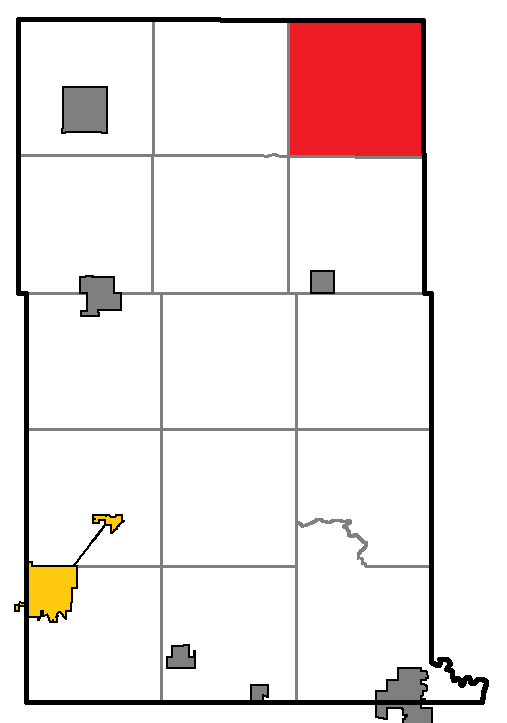
- Location of Huntersville Township, within Wadena County, Minnesota
- Coordinates: 46°45′23″N 94°53′1″W
- Country: United States
- State: Minnesota
- County: Wadena

Area
  - Total: 35.9 sq mi (92.9 km^{2})
  - Land: 34.9 sq mi (90.3 km^{2})
  - Water: 1.0 sq mi (2.6 km^{2})
- Elevation: 1,375 ft (419 m)

Population (2020)
  - Total: 101
  - Density: 2.90/sq mi (1.12/km^{2})
- Time zone: UTC-6 (Central (CST))
  - Summer (DST): UTC-5 (CDT)
- ZIP code: 56464
- Area code: 218
- FIPS code: 27-30536
- GNIS feature ID: 0664532

Huntersville Township is a township in Wadena County, Minnesota, United States. The population was 101 at the 2020 census. The unincorporated place also called Huntersville is located in this township, at the junction of County Roads 18 and 25. Most of Huntersville State Forest is located within this township as well.

Huntersville Township was named on account of the area being a favorite hunting ground.

== Geography ==
According to the United States Census Bureau, the township has a total area of 35.9 square miles (93 km^{2}); 34.8 square miles (90 km^{2}) of it is land and 1.0 square mile (2.6 km^{2}) of it (2.82%) is water. The Crow Wing River flows through Huntersville Township, and every other stream within the township is a tributary of the Crow Wing. The township also contains several small lakes and ponds.

== Demographics ==
As of the census of 2000, there were 128 people, 51 households, and 39 families residing in the township. The population density was 3.7 inhabitants per square mile (1.4/km^{2}). There were 84 housing units at an average density of 2.4 per square mile (0.93/km^{2}). The racial makeup of the township was 99.22% White and 0.78% Native American.

There were 51 households, out of which 31.4% had children under the age of 18 living with them, 66.7% were married couples living together, 9.8% had a female householder with no husband present, and 21.6% were non-families. 21.6% of all households were made up of individuals, and 7.8% had someone living alone who was 65 years of age or older. The average household size was 2.51 and the average family size was 2.93.

In the township the population was spread out, with 26.6% under the age of 18, 4.7% from 18 to 24, 30.5% from 25 to 44, 28.1% from 45 to 64, and 10.2% who were 65 years of age or older. The median age was 39 years. For every 100 females, there were 103.2 males. For every 100 females age 18 and over, there were 104.3 males.

The median income for a household in the township was $32,500, and the median income for a family was $35,000. Males had a median income of $18,750 versus $24,063 for females. The per capita income for the township was $12,320. There were 15.2% of families and 25.2% of the population living below the poverty line, including 30.8% of under eighteens and none of those over 64.
