= North Germany Township, Wadena County, Minnesota =

North Germany Township, Minnesota
- Township
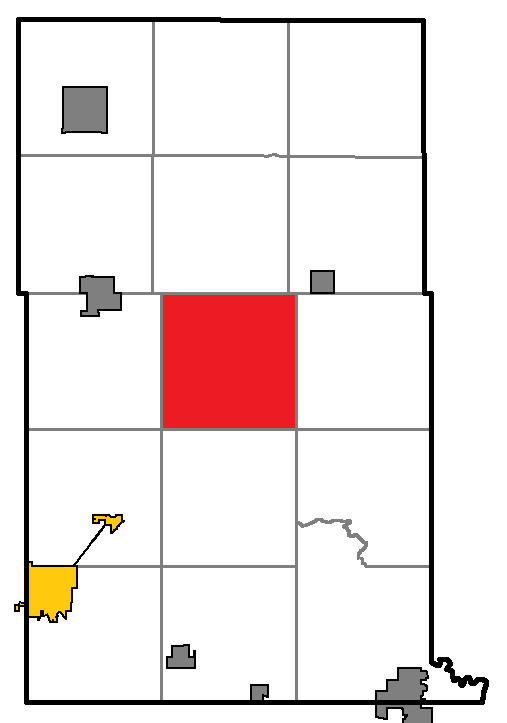
- Location of North Germany Township, within Wadena County, Minnesota
- Coordinates: 46°35′12″N 94°59′20″W
- Country: United States
- State: Minnesota
- County: Wadena

Area
  - Total: 35.8 sq mi (92.8 km^{2})
  - Land: 35.8 sq mi (92.7 km^{2})
  - Water: 0 sq mi (0.0 km^{2})
- Elevation: 1,355 ft (413 m)

Population (2020)
  - Total: 290
  - Density: 8.1/sq mi (3.1/km^{2})
- Time zone: UTC-6 (Central (CST))
  - Summer (DST): UTC-5 (CDT)
- FIPS code: 27-46978
- GNIS feature ID: 0665157

North Germany Township is a township in Wadena County, Minnesota, United States. The population was 290 at the 2020 census.

North Germany Township was named after Germany, the native land of a large share of its early settlers.

== Geography ==
According to the United States Census Bureau, the township has a total area of 35.8 square miles (92.7 km^{2}); 35.8 square miles (92.7 km^{2}) of it is land and 0.03% is water.

== Demographics ==
As of the census of 2000, there were 327 people, 121 households, and 95 families residing in the township. The population density was 9.1 people per square mile (3.5/km^{2}). There were 150 housing units at an average density of 4.2/sq mi (1.6/km^{2}). The racial makeup of the township was 98.17% White, 0.31% Asian, 0.61% Pacific Islander, and 0.92% from two or more races.

There were 121 households, out of which 34.7% had children under the age of 18 living with them, 66.1% were married couples living together, 6.6% had a female householder with no husband present, and 20.7% were non-families. 19.0% of all households were made up of individuals, and 6.6% had someone living alone who was 65 years of age or older. The average household size was 2.70 and the average family size was 3.05.

In the township the population was spread out, with 25.7% under the age of 18, 10.1% from 18 to 24, 24.5% from 25 to 44, 24.5% from 45 to 64, and 15.3% who were 65 years of age or older. The median age was 38 years. For every 100 females, there were 118.0 males. For every 100 females age 18 and over, there were 109.5 males.

The median income for a household in the township was $29,167, and the median income for a family was $30,000. Males had a median income of $27,813 versus $22,679 for females. The per capita income for the township was $12,998. About 12.0% of families and 17.9% of the population were below the poverty line, including 24.4% of those under age 18 and 17.0% of those age 65 or over.
