= Shell City, Minnesota =

Ghost town in Wadena County, United States

Coordinates: 46.7961°N 94.9507°W

Shell City is a ghost town in section 2 of Shell River Township in Wadena County, Minnesota, United States.

== History ==
The village of Shell City was established by William E. Kindred as the Kindred post office in 1879. The townsite was then sold to Francis M. Yoder and Sewall Chandler in 1881 and the name was changed to Shell City in 1882. The town failed to develop as hoped, and the post office was discontinued in 1901. Today, the cemetery, a campground and a horse camp that share Shell City's name are all that hint at the townsite's location.
