= Wadena County, Minnesota =

County in Minnesota, United States

- County
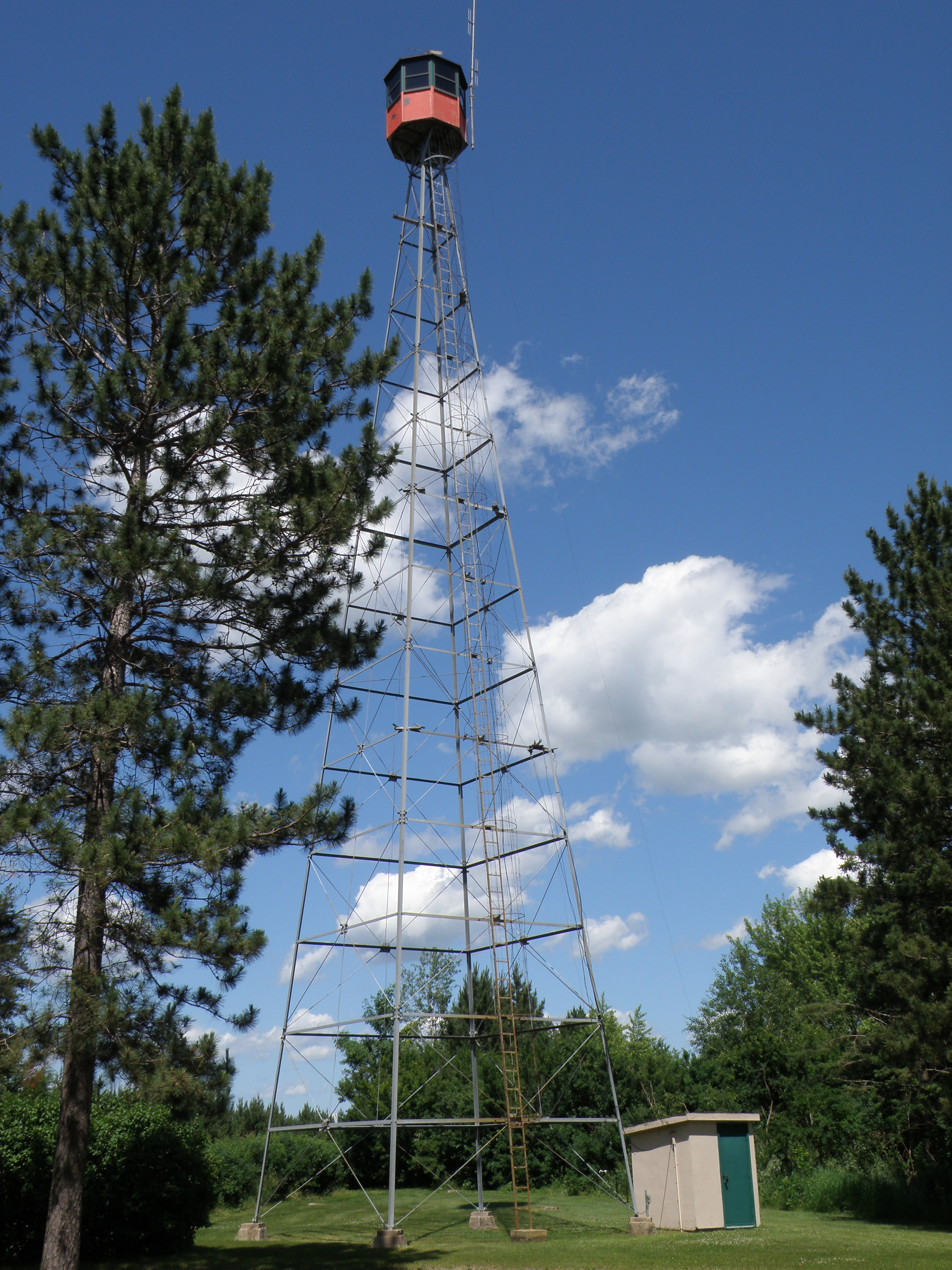
- 1928 Nimrod Fire Tower, Nimrod, Minnesota.

- Location within the U.S. state of Minnesota
- Coordinates: 46°35′N 94°58′W
- Country: United States
- State: Minnesota
- Founded: June 11, 1858 (created); February 21, 1873 (organized)
- Named for: A trading post
- Seat: Wadena
- Largest city: Wadena

Area
  - Total: 543 sq mi (1,410 km^{2})
  - Land: 536 sq mi (1,390 km^{2})
  - Water: 7.0 sq mi (18 km^{2}) 1.3%

Population (2020)
  - Total: 14,065
  - Estimate (2025): 14,388 ▲
  - Density: 26.2/sq mi (10.1/km^{2})
- Time zone: UTC−6 (Central)
  - Summer (DST): UTC−5 (CDT)
- Congressional district: 8th
- Website: www.co.wadena.mn.us

Wadena County (/wəˈdiːnə/ wə-DEEN-ə) is a county in the U.S. state of Minnesota. As of the 2020 census, the population was 14,065. Its county seat is Wadena.

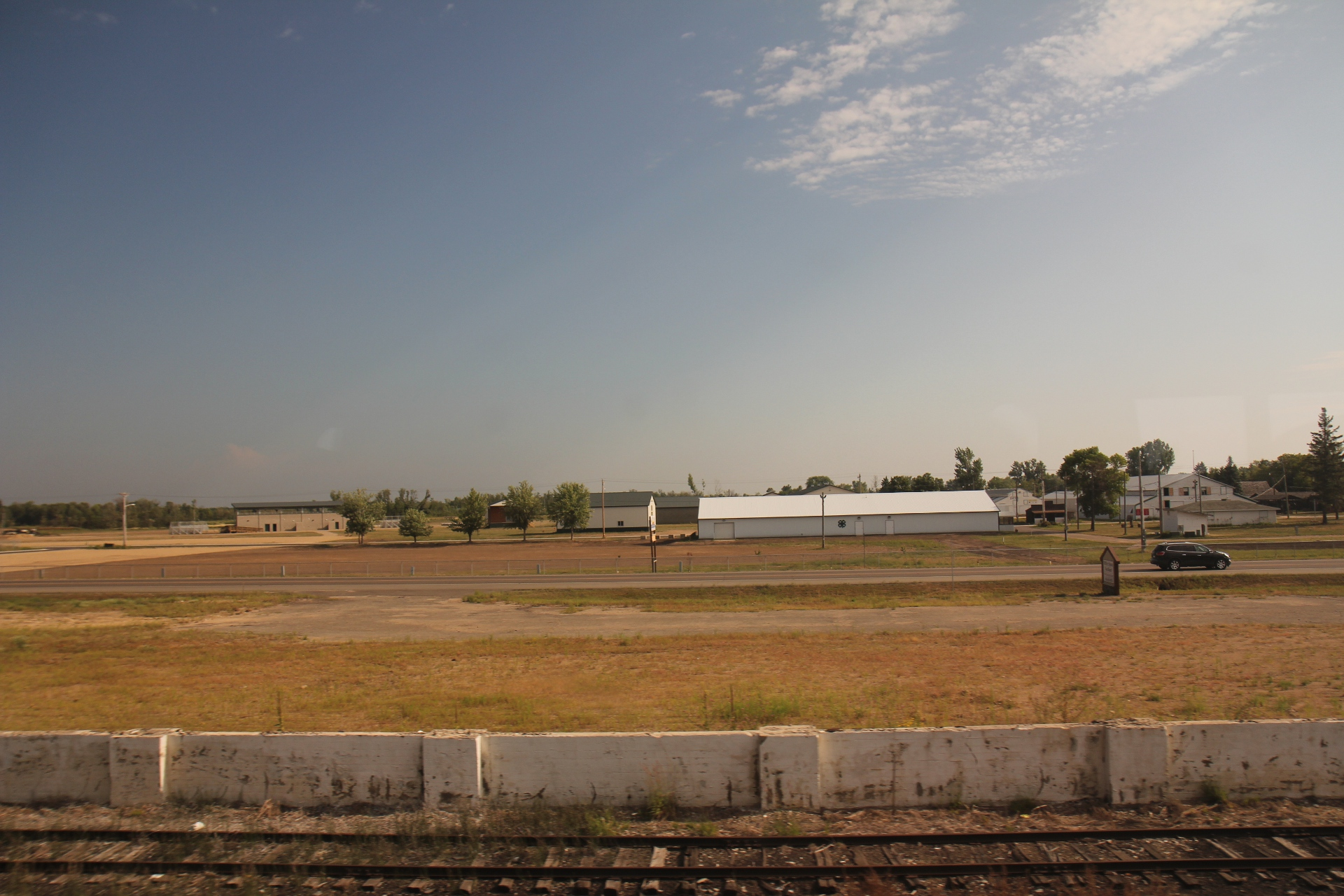
Wadena County Fairgrounds

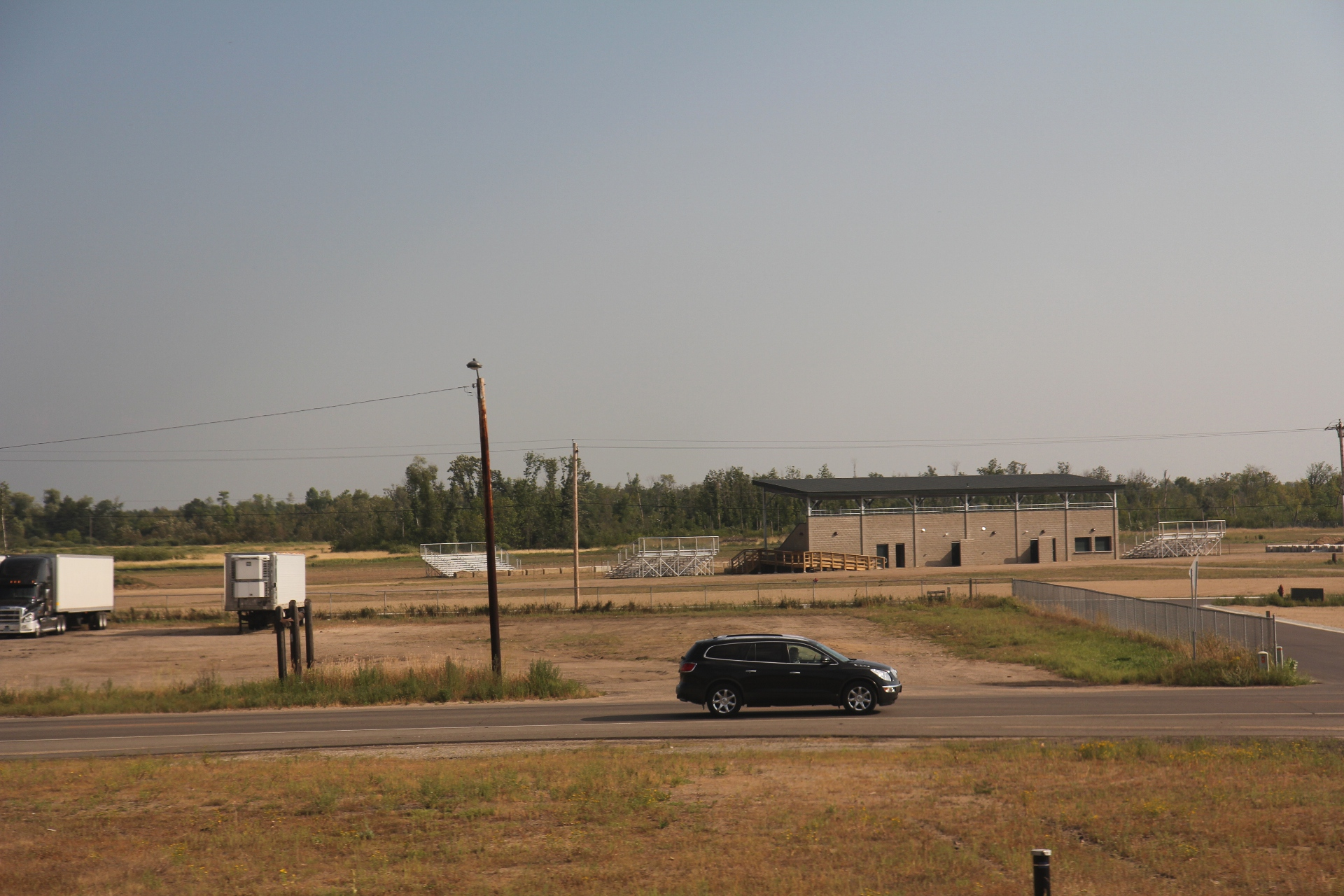
The grandstands at the Wadena County Fairgrounds

== History ==
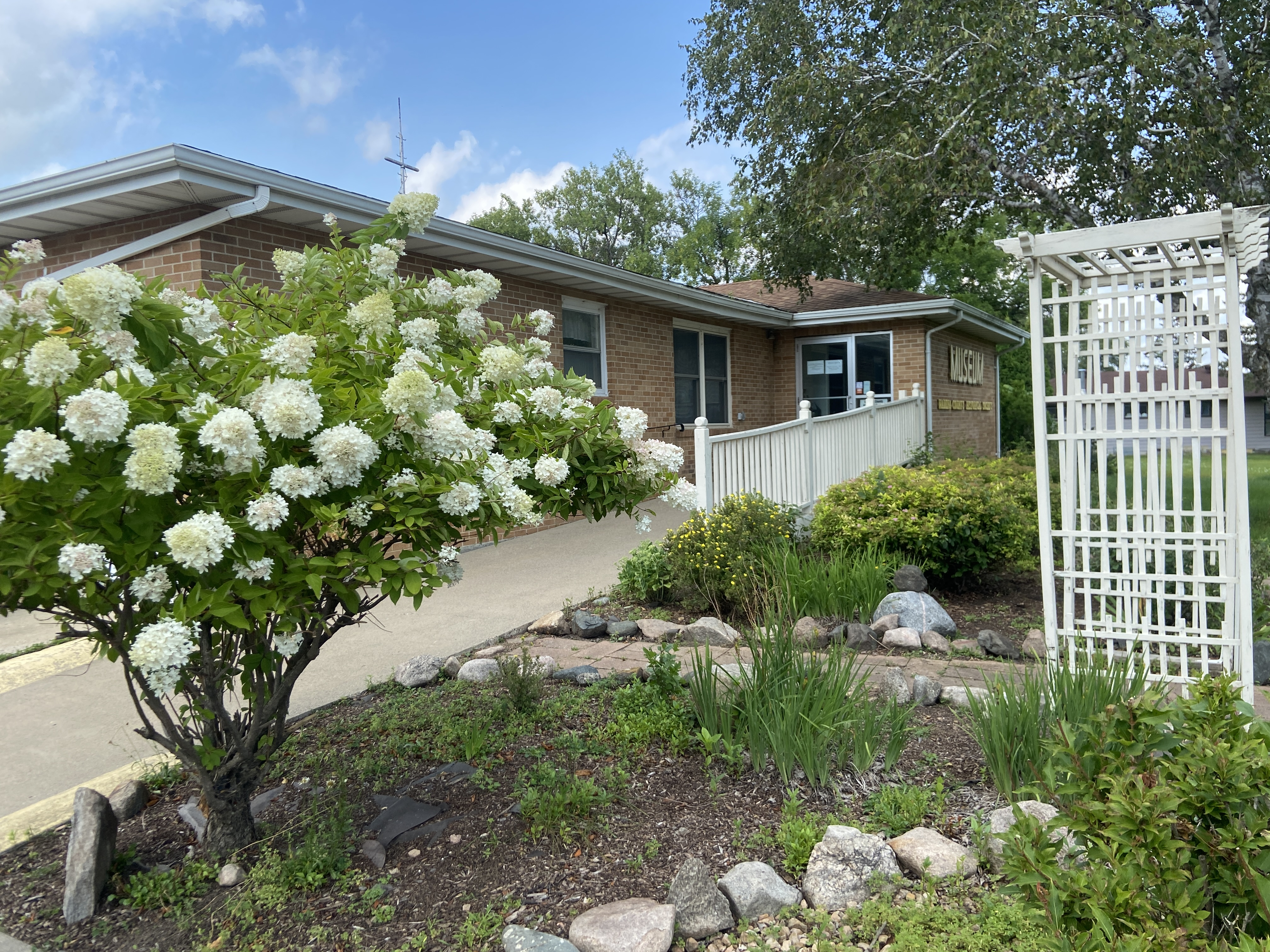
Wadena County Historical Society Museum

The newly organized Minnesota Legislature created the county on June 11, 1858. A settlement began at the future city of Wadena in 1871, and by 1873 a post office was in operation there. The settlement was designated the county seat when the state legislature organized the county on February 21, 1873. The town took the name of a trading post 15 miles (24 km) to the east, which had flourished for several years but was largely abandoned by that time. The trading post was named for Chief Wadena, an Ojibwe Indian chief of the late 19th century in northwestern Minnesota.

Wadena County comprises 15 townships, first surveyed in 1863. Each township is six miles square and contains 36 sections of land (with the exception of Bullard and Thomastown, which have a slightly different configuration because their boundaries are aligned with the Leaf and Crow Wing Rivers, respectively). In 1857 Augustus Aspinwall laid out a town site in what is now Section 15, Thomastown township, at the junction of the Crow Wing and Partridge rivers, and named it Wadena. When the railroad went through the area in 1872, it ran about three miles south of this site and the town quickly withered away.

During the last part of the 19th century and the first half of the 20th, there were two railroads in the county. The Northern Pacific main line running east to west through Wadena was built in 1872, while the Great Northern branch or "K" line which ran from Sauk Centre to Bemidji, via Sebeka and Menahga, was completed in 1891. The line from Park Rapids to Long Prairie was abandoned in 1984 while the rest was abandoned in the early 1970s with the northern section from Park Rapids to Cass Lake since converted to the Heartland Trail.

Wadena used to be served by the Greyhound Bus Line, Elliott Bros. Transportation Co., Northwest Transportation Co., Red Bus Line, Gray Bus Line, Liederbach Bus Co. and Mercury Bus line.

There are four historical societies in the county, including the Wadena County Historical Society, the Verndale Historical Society, the Sebeka Finnish American Historical Society and the Menahga Historical Society.

In 2010 there were four organized school districts in the county: Wadena, Verndale, Sebeka and Menahga. In 1906 there were 52 school districts in the county, most of which were rural schools.

Sebeka once had Minnesota's second-largest creamery. Over the years there have been approximately ten creameries in the county and ten cheese factories.

== Geography ==
The Crow Wing River flows south through the east-central part of the county and forms the lower part of the county's eastern border as it turns to flow southeast. The Partridge River flows east through the southern part of the county, discharging into the Crow Wing in the county's southeast corner. The Leaf River flows east through the central part of the county, discharging into the Crow Wing in the county's eastern portion. The county terrain consists of low rolling hills, carved by drainages, devoted to agriculture wherever possible. The terrain slopes to the east and south, with its highest point near its northwest corner, at 1,460 ft (450 m) ASL. The county has a total area of 543 square miles (1,410 km^{2}), of which 536 square miles (1,390 km^{2}) is land and 7.0 square miles (18 km^{2}) (1.3%) is water. Wadena is one of 17 Minnesota counties with more savanna soils than prairie or forest soils.

Soils of Wadena County

=== Major highways ===
- U.S. Route 10
- U.S. Route 71
- Minnesota State Highway 29
- Minnesota State Highway 87

=== Airports ===
- Staples Municipal Airport (SAZ) - north of Staples

=== Adjacent counties ===
- Hubbard County - north
- Cass County - east
- Todd County - south
- Otter Tail County - southwest
- Becker County - northwest

=== Protected areas ===
- Burgen Lake Prairie Wildlife Management Area
- Dry Sand State Wildlife Management Area
- Huntersville State Forest
- Lyons State Forest
- Old Wadena County Park
  - Old Wadena Historic District

=== Lakes ===
- Bill Lake
- Blueberry Lake
- Burgen Lake
- Duck Lake (part)
- Finn Lake
- Granning Lake
- Jim Cook Lake
- Lily Lake
- Lovejoy Lake
- Lower Twin Lake
- Mud Lake
- Radabaugh Lake
- Rice Lake
- Round Lake
- Simon Lake
- Spirit Lake
- Stocking Lake
- Strike Lake]
- Thomas Lake
- Upper Twin Lake (part)
- Yaeger Lake

== Demographics ==
Historical population
Census	Pop.	Note	%±
1870	6		—
1880	2,080		34,566.7%
1890	4,058		95.1%
1900	7,921		95.2%
1910	8,652		9.2%
1920	10,699		23.7%
1930	10,990		2.7%
1940	12,772		16.2%
1950	12,806		0.3%
1960	12,199		−4.7%
1970	12,412		1.7%
1980	14,192		14.3%
1990	13,154		−7.3%
2000	13,713		4.2%
2010	13,843		0.9%
2020	14,065		1.6%
2025 (est.)	14,388	▲	2.3%
U.S. Decennial Census; 1790-1960 1900-1990; 1990-2000 2010-2020

=== 2020 census ===
As of the 2020 census, the county had a population of 14,065. The median age was 42.5 years. 24.7% of residents were under the age of 18 and 23.1% of residents were 65 years of age or older. For every 100 females there were 98.3 males, and for every 100 females age 18 and over there were 96.9 males age 18 and over.

The racial makeup of the county was 93.3% White, 0.9% Black or African American, 0.5% American Indian and Alaska Native, 0.5% Asian, 0.1% Native Hawaiian and Pacific Islander, 0.6% from some other race, and 4.1% from two or more races. Hispanic or Latino residents of any race comprised 1.9% of the population.

28.2% of residents lived in urban areas, while 71.8% lived in rural areas.

There were 5,815 households in the county, of which 26.6% had children under the age of 18 living in them. Of all households, 47.6% were married-couple households, 20.6% were households with a male householder and no spouse or partner present, and 24.8% were households with a female householder and no spouse or partner present. About 33.3% of all households were made up of individuals and 16.5% had someone living alone who was 65 years of age or older.

There were 6,939 housing units, of which 16.2% were vacant. Among occupied housing units, 72.6% were owner-occupied and 27.4% were renter-occupied. The homeowner vacancy rate was 1.6% and the rental vacancy rate was 11.8%.

=== Racial and ethnic composition ===
Wadena County, Minnesota – Racial and ethnic composition Note: the US Census treats Hispanic/Latino as an ethnic category. This table excludes Latinos from the racial categories and assigns them to a separate category. Hispanics/Latinos may be of any race.
Race / Ethnicity (NH = Non-Hispanic)	Pop 1980	Pop 1990	Pop 2000	Pop 2010	Pop 2020	% 1980	% 1990	% 2000	% 2010	% 2020
White alone (NH)	14,046	12,986	13,340	13,262	13,044	98.97%	98.72%	97.28%	95.80%	92.74%
Black or African American alone (NH)	24	8	65	109	118	0.17%	0.06%	0.47%	0.79%	0.84%
Native American or Alaska Native alone (NH)	57	77	73	64	73	0.40%	0.59%	0.53%	0.46%	0.52%
Asian alone (NH)	25	35	25	36	54	0.18%	0.27%	0.18%	0.26%	0.38%
Native Hawaiian or Pacific Islander alone (NH)	x	x	4	0	9	x	x	0.03%	0.00%	0.06%
Other race alone (NH)	9	1	5	1	19	0.06%	0.01%	0.04%	0.01%	0.14%
Mixed race or Multiracial (NH)	x	x	73	195	475	x	x	0.53%	1.41%	3.38%
Hispanic or Latino (any race)	31	47	128	176	273	0.22%	0.36%	0.93%	1.27%	1.94%
Total	14,192	13,154	13,713	13,843	14,065	100.00%	100.00%	100.00%	100.00%	100.00%

=== 2000 census ===
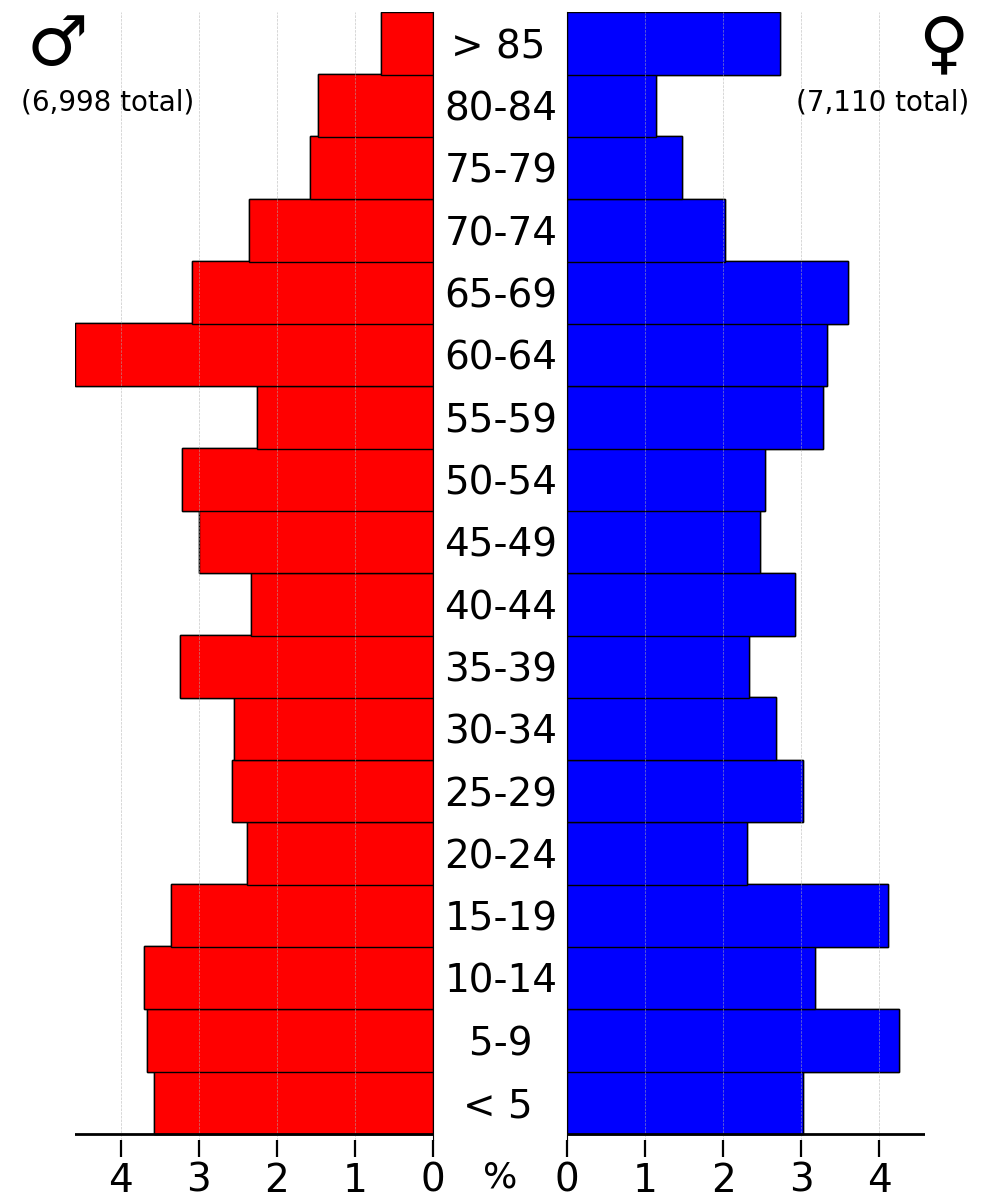
2022 US Census population pyramid for Wadena County, from ACS 5-year estimates

As of the census of 2000, there were 13,713 people, 5,426 households, and 3,608 families in the county. The population density was 25.6 per square mile (9.9/km^{2}). There were 6,334 housing units at an average density of 11.8 per square mile (4.6/km^{2}). The racial makeup of the county was 97.89% White, 0.48% Black or African American, 0.55% Native American, 0.18% Asian, 0.03% Pacific Islander, 0.27% from other races, and 0.59% from two or more races. 0.93% of the population were Hispanic or Latino of any race. 37.5% were of German, 14.0% Norwegian, 12.5% Finnish, 9.0% United States or American and 5.3% Swedish ancestry.

There were 5,426 households, out of which 30.00% had children under the age of 18 living with them, 55.30% were married couples living together, 7.60% had a female householder with no husband present, and 33.50% were non-families. 29.20% of all households were made up of individuals, and 15.10% had someone living alone who was 65 years of age or older. The average household size was 2.45 and the average family size was 3.02.

The county population contained 25.80% under the age of 18, 8.10% from 18 to 24, 23.60% from 25 to 44, 22.60% from 45 to 64, and 19.90% who were 65 years of age or older. The median age was 40 years. For every 100 females there were 97.90 males. For every 100 females age 18 and over, there were 94.90 males.

The median income for a household in the county was $30,651, and the median income for a family was $38,618. Males had a median income of $28,424 versus $21,027 for females. The per capita income for the county was $15,146. About 9.70% of families and 14.10% of the population were below the poverty line, including 15.40% of those under age 18 and 12.60% of those age 65 or over.

== Communities ==
=== Cities ===
- Aldrich
- Menahga
- Nimrod
- Sebeka
- Staples (part)
- Verndale
- Wadena (county seat; partly in Otter Tail County)

=== Unincorporated communities ===
- Bluegrass
- Huntersville
- Oylen

=== Ghost towns ===
- Leaf River
- Shell City

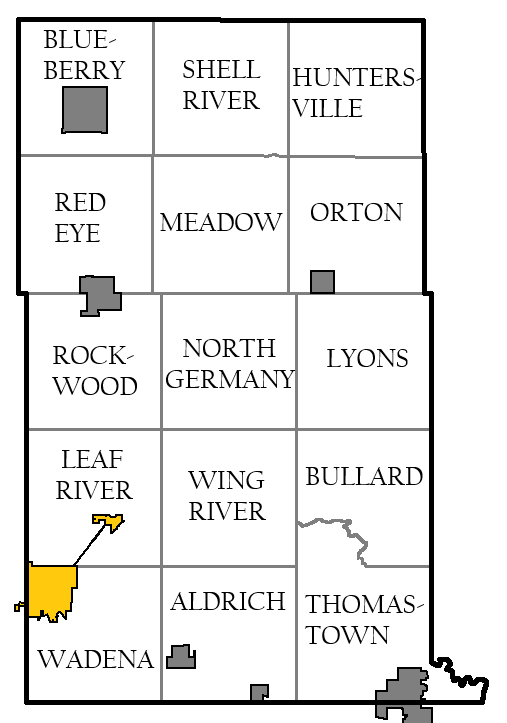
Townships of Wadena County

=== Townships ===
- Aldrich Township
- Blueberry Township
- Bullard Township
- Huntersville Township
- Leaf River Township
- Lyons Township
- Meadow Township
- North Germany Township
- Orton Township
- Red Eye Township
- Rockwood Township
- Shell River Township
- Thomastown Township
- Wadena Township
- Wing River Township

== Government and politics ==
Wadena County voters have traditionally voted Republican. In only one national election since 1964 has the county selected the Democratic Party candidate (as of 2024). The 2016, 2020, and 2024 elections each subsequently showed the strongest Republican support in the county since 1920, with Donald Trump receiving nearly three-quarters of the vote in 2024.

United States presidential election results for Wadena County, Minnesota
Year	Republican		Democratic		Third party(ies)	
Year	No.	%	No.	%	No.	%
1892	454	45.35%	332	33.17%	215	21.48%
1896	874	60.65%	534	37.06%	33	2.29%
1900	949	65.67%	448	31.00%	48	3.32%
1904	1,159	82.55%	190	13.53%	55	3.92%
1908	991	63.57%	467	29.96%	101	6.48%
1912	278	20.90%	336	25.26%	716	53.83%
1916	938	54.31%	651	37.70%	138	7.99%
1920	2,635	75.57%	503	14.43%	349	10.01%
1924	1,900	54.83%	182	5.25%	1,383	39.91%
1928	2,592	64.09%	1,343	33.21%	109	2.70%
1932	1,585	39.33%	2,300	57.07%	145	3.60%
1936	1,898	40.83%	2,605	56.03%	146	3.14%
1940	2,898	54.27%	2,405	45.04%	37	0.69%
1944	2,653	58.47%	1,868	41.17%	16	0.35%
1948	2,272	46.21%	2,556	51.98%	89	1.81%
1952	3,662	68.54%	1,665	31.16%	16	0.30%
1956	3,028	63.52%	1,733	36.35%	6	0.13%
1960	3,082	57.83%	2,240	42.03%	7	0.13%
1964	2,418	45.33%	2,908	54.52%	8	0.15%
1968	2,912	54.07%	2,198	40.81%	276	5.12%
1972	3,408	57.05%	2,430	40.68%	136	2.28%
1976	3,048	47.45%	3,164	49.25%	212	3.30%
1980	4,089	57.57%	2,635	37.10%	379	5.34%
1984	4,306	63.40%	2,454	36.13%	32	0.47%
1988	3,733	59.26%	2,484	39.43%	82	1.30%
1992	2,492	38.95%	2,340	36.57%	1,566	24.48%
1996	2,696	44.64%	2,480	41.06%	864	14.30%
2000	3,733	58.49%	2,251	35.27%	398	6.24%
2004	4,214	59.41%	2,791	39.35%	88	1.24%
2008	4,128	57.58%	2,882	40.20%	159	2.22%
2012	4,143	61.01%	2,492	36.70%	156	2.30%
2016	4,837	69.76%	1,684	24.29%	413	5.96%
2020	5,520	71.90%	2,023	26.35%	134	1.75%
2024	6,028	74.91%	1,898	23.59%	121	1.50%

County Board of Commissioners
Position	Name	District
Commissioner	Ron Noon	District 1
Commissioner	Michael Weyer	District 2
Commissioner	Bill Stearns	District 3
Commissioner	Murlyn Kreklau	District 4
Commissioner	John Kangas	District 5

State Legislature (2018–2020)
Position	Name	Affiliation	District
Senate	Paul Utke	Republican	District 2
Senate	Paul Gazelka	Republican	District 9
House of Representatives	Steve Green	Republican	District 2B
House of Representatives	John Poston	Republican	District 9A

U.S Congress (2018–2020)
Position	Name	Affiliation	District
House of Representatives	Pete Stauber	Republican	8th
Senate	Amy Klobuchar	Democrat	N/A
Senate	Tina Smith	Democrat	N/A

== See also ==
- National Register of Historic Places listings in Wadena County, Minnesota
