= Shell River Township, Wadena County, Minnesota =

Shell River Township, Minnesota
- Township
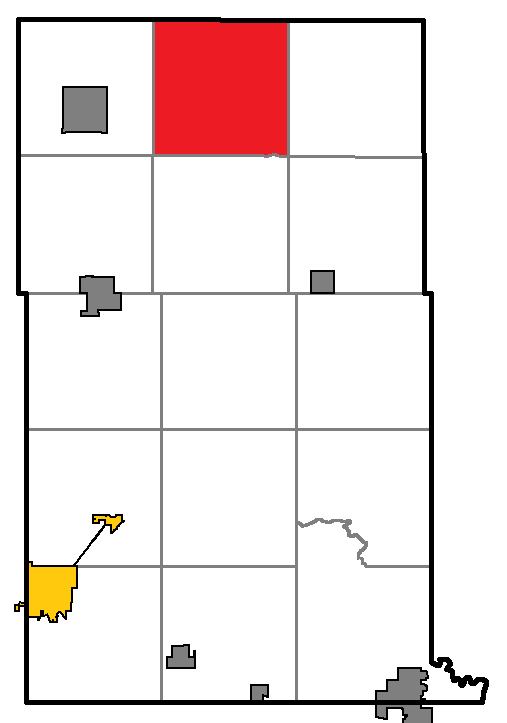
- Location of Shell River Township, within Wadena County, Minnesota
- Coordinates: 46°46′7″N 94°58′31″W
- Country: United States
- State: Minnesota
- County: Wadena

Area
  - Total: 36.1 sq mi (93.5 km^{2})
  - Land: 34.8 sq mi (90.1 km^{2})
  - Water: 1.4 sq mi (3.5 km^{2})
- Elevation: 1,391 ft (424 m)

Population (2020)
  - Total: 287
  - Density: 8.25/sq mi (3.19/km^{2})
- Time zone: UTC-6 (Central (CST))
  - Summer (DST): UTC-5 (CDT)
- ZIP code: 56464
- Area code: 218
- FIPS code: 27-59530
- GNIS feature ID: 0665589

Shell River Township is a township in Wadena County, Minnesota, United States. The population was 287 at the 2020 census. The township was named for the Shell River, which flows through it; the river was named for abundant clam and mussel shells found along its banks.

== Geography ==
According to the United States Census Bureau, the township has a total area of 36.1 square miles (93.6 km^{2}); 34.8 square miles (90.1 km^{2}) of it is land and 1.3 square miles (3.5 km^{2}) of it (3.71%) is water.

== Demographics ==
As of the census of 2000, there were 276 people, 102 households, and 73 families residing in the township. The population density was 7.9 people per square mile (3.1/km^{2}). There were 185 housing units at an average density of 5.3/sq mi (2.1/km^{2}). The racial makeup of the township was 95.65% White, 0.72% African American, 1.09% Native American, and 2.54% from two or more races. Hispanic or Latino of any race were 0.72% of the population.

There were 102 households, out of which 41.2% had children under the age of 18 living with them, 61.8% were married couples living together, 5.9% had a female householder with no husband present, and 28.4% were non-families. 20.6% of all households were made up of individuals, and 2.9% had someone living alone who was 65 years of age or older. The average household size was 2.71 and the average family size was 3.16.

In the township the population was spread out, with 29.3% under the age of 18, 7.2% from 18 to 24, 29.3% from 25 to 44, 22.5% from 45 to 64, and 11.6% who were 65 years of age or older. The median age was 37 years. For every 100 females, there were 101.5 males. For every 100 females age 18 and over, there were 109.7 males.

The median income for a household in the township was $30,000, and the median income for a family was $33,750. Males had a median income of $27,250 versus $24,375 for females. The per capita income for the township was $16,529. About 5.0% of families and 8.3% of the population were below the poverty line, including 3.6% of those under the age of eighteen and 15.4% of those 65 or over.
