= Crow Wing River =

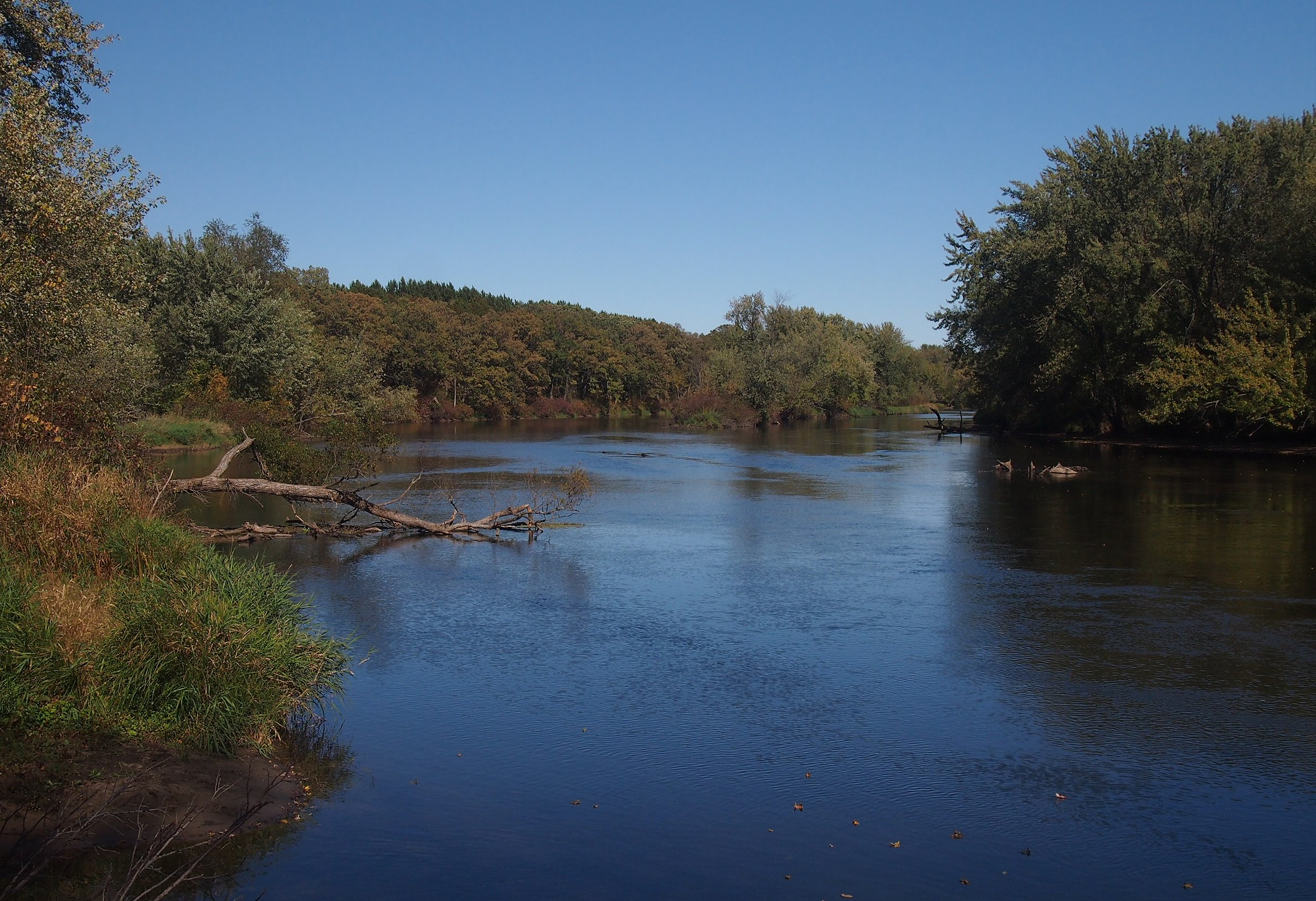
- The Crow Wing River in Old Wadena County Park

- The Crow Wing River

Location
- Country: United States
- State: Minnesota

Physical characteristics
- Source
  - coordinates: 47°00′07″N 94°44′29″W
  - elevation: 1,391 ft (424 m)
- Mouth
  - coordinates: 46°16′16″N 94°20′23″W
  - elevation: 1,145 ft (349 m)
- Length: 113-mile-long (182 km)
- Discharge
  - location: Pillager, Minnesota
  - average: 1,574 cu ft/s (44.6 m^{3}/s).

The Crow Wing River is a 113-mile-long (182 km) tributary of the Mississippi River in Minnesota, United States. The river rises at an elevation of about 1391 feet in a chain of 11 lakes in southern Hubbard County, Minnesota, and flows generally south, then east, entering the Mississippi at Crow Wing State Park northwest of Little Falls, Minnesota. Its name is a loose translation from the Ojibwe language Gaagaagiwigwani-ziibi ("Raven-feather River"). A wing-shaped island at its mouth accounts for the river's name. Because of its many campsites and its undeveloped shores, the Crow Wing River is considered one of the state's best "wilderness" routes for canoeists; although it is shallow (seldom more than 3 feet (0.91 m) deep), it is nearly always deep enough for canoeing.

== Landscape ==
Much of the river is flanked by thick forests. For its first 20 miles (32 km) the river cuts through low marshy lands. The river broadens and the banks increase in height as it flows southward. Jack pine forest has all but replaced the virgin white and red pine forests on the sandy plains of northern Wadena County, Minnesota. Hazel, blueberries, sweet fern, bearberry, wintergreen, bracken and reindeer moss provide lush ground cover. The Crow Wing's lower reaches are flanked by a river bottom forest of elm, ash, cottonwood, box elder, oak, basswood, maple, willow and aspen. Grasslands, bogs and swamps are scattered throughout the river corridor.

== Fish and wildlife ==
Due to its sandy bottom, limited cover and dearth of deep pools, the Crow Wing is not a good game fish river. Shorthead redhorse and white sucker, both rough fish, are the river's most common species.

The diversity of vegetation along the river supports a wide variety of wildlife. Canoeists may see turtles, otters, muskrats, beavers, mink, raccoons, gophers, chipmunks, squirrels and rabbit. Bobcats and a small number of black bears also inhabit the river area. It is not unusual to even see eagles fishing from the river.

Game species include white-tailed deer, ruffed grouse, woodcock and various waterfowl. The Crow Wing supports only a limited number of waterfowl because of sparse aquatic vegetation and a lack of backwater areas.

== Cultural information ==
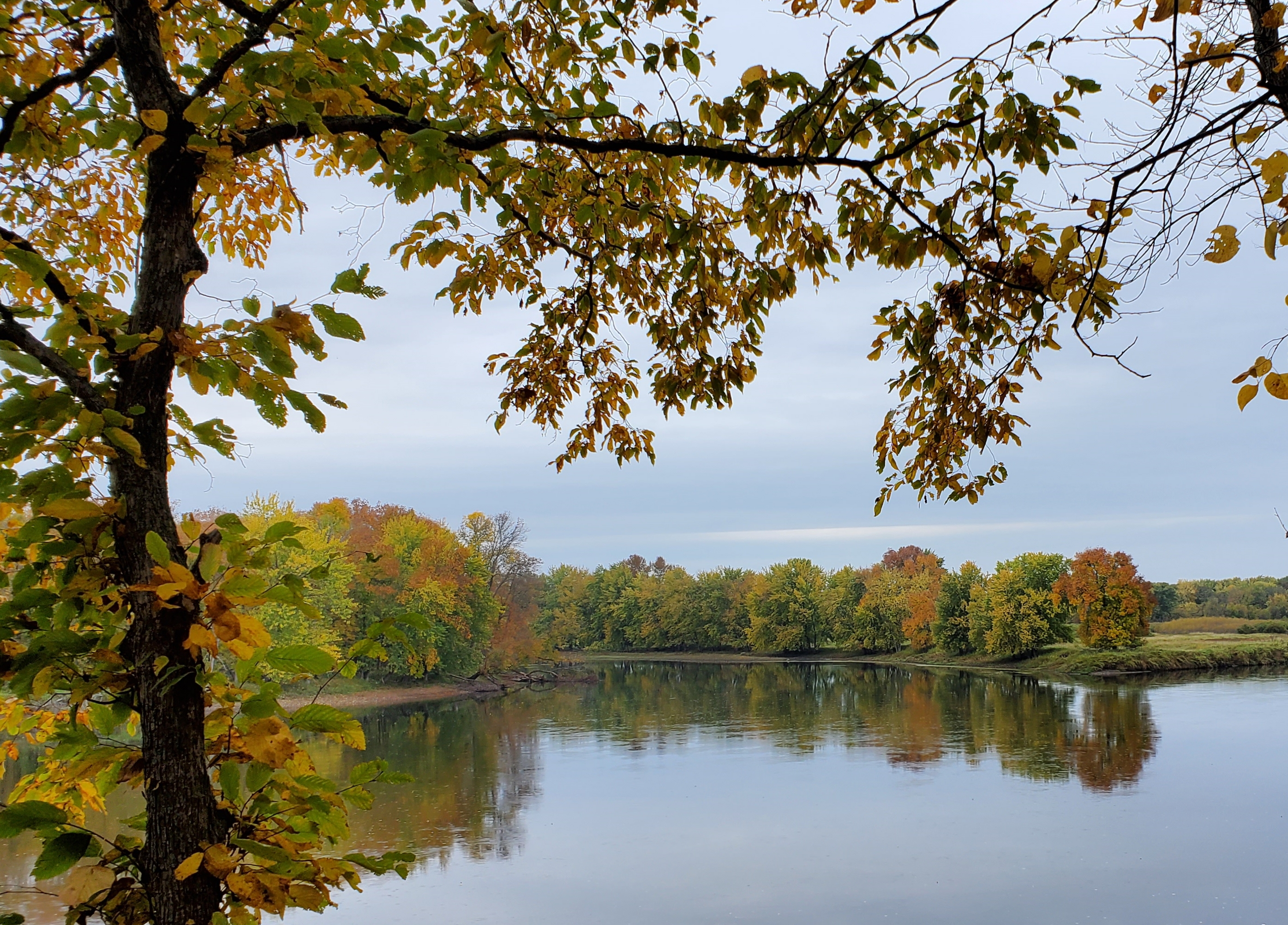
The Crow Wing River (left), as it flows into the Mississippi River (right and foreground)

The Dakota people held the Crow Wing region until the Ojibwe began moving westward into the region in the early 18th century. By the early 19th century the Ojibwe controlled lands west of the Mississippi and north of the Crow Wing. Signs of Native American presence mark the river corridor, with Native American burial mounds at several sites along the river, including a site at river mile 61.

Fur traders entered the region in the early 18th century. In 1792 the North West Company established the Wadena Trading Post on the west bluff of the river at its junction with the Partridge River. There was considerable overland trade in the area by the 19th century. The Old Otter Tail Trail crossed the river near the Wadena post and was the main transportation route between Saint Paul and Fort Garry in Winnipeg.

Dense forests near the river made Nimrod, Minnesota an important lumbering center from the 1870s to the early 20th century. By the start of the 20th century, most of the virgin timber had been cleared, and the economy came to depend on agriculture. The river continues to attract a small but devoted number of visitors, ranging from regional outdoor enthusiasts in late spring to Native Americans who harvest wild rice growing along the river in the autumn.

Nimrod is also the home of canoe outfitters who rent canoes by the day or longer to the aforementioned groups throughout the six-month season and is home to the city park of Stigman's Mound, named in honor of former major league baseball pitcher Dick Stigman, who was born and raised there.

== See also ==
- List of rivers of Minnesota
