= Philbrook, Minnesota =

Philbrook
- Unincorporated community
- Location within Minnesota Location within the United States
- Coordinates: 46°17′00″N 94°43′01″W
- Country: United States
- State: Minnesota
- County: Todd
- Township: Fawn Lake Township and Villard Township
- Elevation: 1,250 ft (380 m)
- Time zone: UTC-6 (Central (CST))
  - Summer (DST): UTC-5 (CDT)
- ZIP code: 56479, 56466, 56438
- Area codes: 218 and 320
- GNIS feature ID: 649354

Philbrook is an unincorporated community in Todd County, Minnesota, United States. It is along Todd County Road 28 near Red Pine Road. Nearby places include Staples, Motley, Cushing, and Browerville.

== History ==
Philbrook began as Riverside in 1859, and the post office was established in 1889, but because the name Riverside was already in use by another post office, the name was changed to Philbrook in 1890. The post office was changed to a rural branch in 1956 and discontinued in 1964. Philbrook had a station of the Northern Pacific Railroad in section 33 of Villard Township. Saint James Catholic Church in Philbrook was closed in 1962.

== Transportation ==
Amtrak’s Empire Builder, which operates between Seattle/Portland and Chicago, passes through the town on BNSF tracks, but makes no stop. The nearest station is located in Staples, 7 miles (11 km) to the northwest.
