= Swanville, Minnesota =

City in Minnesota, United States

- City
- Motto: "Home of the Mid-Summer Carnival"
- Location in Todd County and the state of Minnesota
- Coordinates: 45°54′58″N 94°38′20″W
- Country: United States
- State: Minnesota
- Counties: Morrison, Todd

Area
  - Total: 0.53 sq mi (1.36 km^{2})
  - Land: 0.53 sq mi (1.36 km^{2})
  - Water: 0 sq mi (0.00 km^{2})
- Elevation: 1,184 ft (361 m)

Population (2020)
  - Total: 326
  - Density: 618.6/sq mi (238.85/km^{2})
- Time zone: UTC-6 (Central (CST))
  - Summer (DST): UTC-5 (CDT)
- ZIP code: 56382
- Area code: 320
- FIPS code: 27-63778
- GNIS feature ID: 2396014
- Website: swanvillemn.gov

Swanville is a city in Morrison County, Minnesota, United States. A very small portion of the city extends into Todd County. The population was 326 at the 2020 census.

== History ==
Swanville was platted in 1882, and named for the nearby Swan River. A post office has been in operation at Swanville since 1883. Swanville was incorporated in 1893.

== Geography ==
Swanville is in western Morrison County, with a small portion of the city limits extending southwest into southeastern Todd County. The city is bordered to the north, east, and south by Swanville Township and to the west by Burnhamville Township. Minnesota State Highway 28 serves as a main route in the community, running through the western side of the city. The highway leads northeast 17 miles (27 km) to Little Falls, the Morrison county seat, and southwest 22 miles (35 km) to Sauk Centre.

According to the U.S. Census Bureau, Swanville has a total area of 0.53 sq mi (1.37 km^{2}), all land. The Swan River passes just west of the city limits, flowing north and then east to the Mississippi River south of Little Falls.

== Demographics ==
Historical population
Census	Pop.	Note	%±
1900	244		—
1910	397		62.7%
1920	400		0.8%
1930	435		8.8%
1940	417		−4.1%
1950	373		−10.6%
1960	342		−8.3%
1970	300		−12.3%
1980	295		−1.7%
1990	324		9.8%
2000	351		8.3%
2010	350		−0.3%
2020	326		−6.9%
U.S. Decennial Census

=== 2010 census ===
As of the census of 2010, there were 350 people, 141 households, and 102 families living in the city. The population density was 673.1/sq mi (259.9/km^{2}). There were 157 housing units at an average density of 301.9/sq mi (116.6/km^{2}). The racial makeup of the city was 98.3% White, 0.3% African American, 0.3% Native American, 0.6% Asian, and 0.6% from two or more races. Hispanic or Latino of any race were 1.4% of the population.

There were 141 households, of which 36.9% had children under the age of 18 living with them, 49.6% were married couples living together, 16.3% had a female householder with no husband present, 6.4% had a male householder with no wife present, and 27.7% were non-families. 26.2% of all households were made up of individuals, and 12% had someone living alone who was 65 years of age or older. The average household size was 2.48 and the average family size was 2.91.

The median age in the city was 37 years. 26.3% of residents were under the age of 18; 9.2% were between the ages of 18 and 24; 24.6% were from 25 to 44; 26% were from 45 to 64; and 14% were 65 years of age or older. The gender makeup of the city was 51.4% male and 48.6% female.

=== 2000 census ===
As of the census of 2000, there were 351 people, 142 households, and 91 families living in the city. The population density was 694.0 inhabitants per square mile (268.0/km^{2}). There were 148 housing units at an average density of 292.6 per square mile (113.0/km^{2}). The racial makeup of the city was 99.43% White, 0.28% Asian, and 0.28% from two or more races. Hispanic or Latino of any race were 1.99% of the population.

There were 142 households, out of which 31.7% had children under the age of 18 living with them, 49.3% were married couples living together, 9.9% had a female householder with no husband present, and 35.9% were non-families. 33.8% of all households were made up of individuals, and 26.1% had someone living alone who was 65 years of age or older. The average household size was 2.47 and the average family size was 3.14.

In the city, the population was spread out, with 26.5% under the age of 18, 10.3% from 18 to 24, 24.2% from 25 to 44, 19.4% from 45 to 64, and 19.7% who were 65 years of age or older. The median age was 36 years. For every 100 females, there were 89.7 males. For every 100 females age 18 and over, there were 84.3 males.

The median income for a household in the city was $31,250, and the median income for a family was $45,875. Males had a median income of $31,667 versus $21,250 for females. The per capita income for the city was $15,007. About 9.6% of families and 12.9% of the population were below the poverty line, including 9.2% of those under age 18 and 32.8% of those age 65 or over.
