= Minnesota State Highway 287 =

Highway in Minnesota

Trunk Highway 287
- MN 287 highlighted in red

Route information
- Maintained by MnDOT
- Length: 14.423 mi (23.212 km)
- Existed: July 1, 1949–present

Major junctions
- South end: MN 28 at Grey Eagle
- North end: US 71 / MN 27 at Long Prairie

Location
- Country: United States
- State: Minnesota
- Counties: Todd

Highway system
- Minnesota Trunk Highway System; Interstate; US; State; Legislative; Scenic
← MN 286	→ MN 308

Minnesota State Highway 287 (MN 287) is a 14.423-mile-long (23.212 km) highway in west-central Minnesota, which runs from its intersection with State Highway 28 in Grey Eagle and continues north to its northern terminus at its intersection with U.S. 71 / State Highway 27 in Long Prairie.

== Route description ==
Highway 287 serves as a north–south route in west-central Minnesota between Grey Eagle and Long Prairie.

The roadway passes around the south side of Trace Lake at Grey Eagle. It also passes around the west side of Big Swan Lake in Burnhamville Township.

Highway 287 changes direction to east–west at its intersection with Todd County Road 13 in Round Prairie Township; and continues as east–west for 2.5 miles before returning again to a north–south direction for the remainder of its route towards Long Prairie.

Highway 287 is also known as State Street West in Grey Eagle. The route follows 4th Avenue SE in Long Prairie.

The route is legally defined as Route 287 in the Minnesota Statutes.

== History ==
Highway 287 was authorized on July 1, 1949.

The route was paved from Grey Eagle to Big Swan Lake in 1952. The remainder was paved in 1954 or 1955.

== Major intersections ==
The entire route is in Todd County.

Location	mi	km	Destinations	Notes
Grey Eagle	0.000	0.000	MN 28 (Cedar Street south, State Street east) – Burtrum, Sauk Centre	
Long Prairie	14.423	23.212	US 71 / MN 27 – Browerville, Sauk Centre	
1.000 mi = 1.609 km; 1.000 km = 0.621 mi
