= Leslie Township, Todd County, Minnesota =

Leslie Township, Minnesota
- Township
- Location within the state of Minnesota Leslie Township, Minnesota (the United States)
- Coordinates: 45°58′5″N 95°4′31″W
- Country: United States
- State: Minnesota
- County: Todd

Area
  - Total: 36.2 sq mi (93.8 km^{2})
  - Land: 34.5 sq mi (89.4 km^{2})
  - Water: 1.7 sq mi (4.4 km^{2})
- Elevation: 1,325 ft (404 m)

Population (2020)
  - Total: 668
  - Density: 20/sq mi (7.7/km^{2})
- Time zone: UTC-6 (Central (CST))
  - Summer (DST): UTC-5 (CDT)
- FIPS code: 27-36674
- GNIS feature ID: 0664764

Leslie Township is a township in the southwestern corner Todd County, Minnesota, United States. The population was 668 at the 2020 census.

Leslie Township was organized in 1876, and named for John B. Leslie, an early settler. A farmer's post office was located in Section 33 from1894 to 1903. Part of the village of Clotho is in the northern part of the township as well as section 39 of Burleene township. Clotho was named after the Greek goddess of the same name. There were three post offices in Clotho between 1879 and 1908. Oak Hill was a railroad village in Leslie township and it had a Great Northern Railway station and a post office in sections 16 and 17, according to page 592 of Upham's 3rd edition of Minnesota Place Names. The Long Prairie River runs through the now abandoned village site of Oak Hill.

== Geography ==
According to the United States Census Bureau, the township has a total area of 36.2 square miles (93.8 km^{2}), of which 34.5 square miles (89.4 km^{2}) is land and 1.7 square miles (4.4 km^{2}) (4.67%) is water. Portions of the Long Prairie River run through the township.

=== Lakes ===
The 114 acre Little Osakis Lake is in section 26 of Leslie Township. It is just north of the larger Lake Osakis which is partly in Leslie and partly in Gordon township. Lake Osakis and Little Osakis are connected by a small stream.

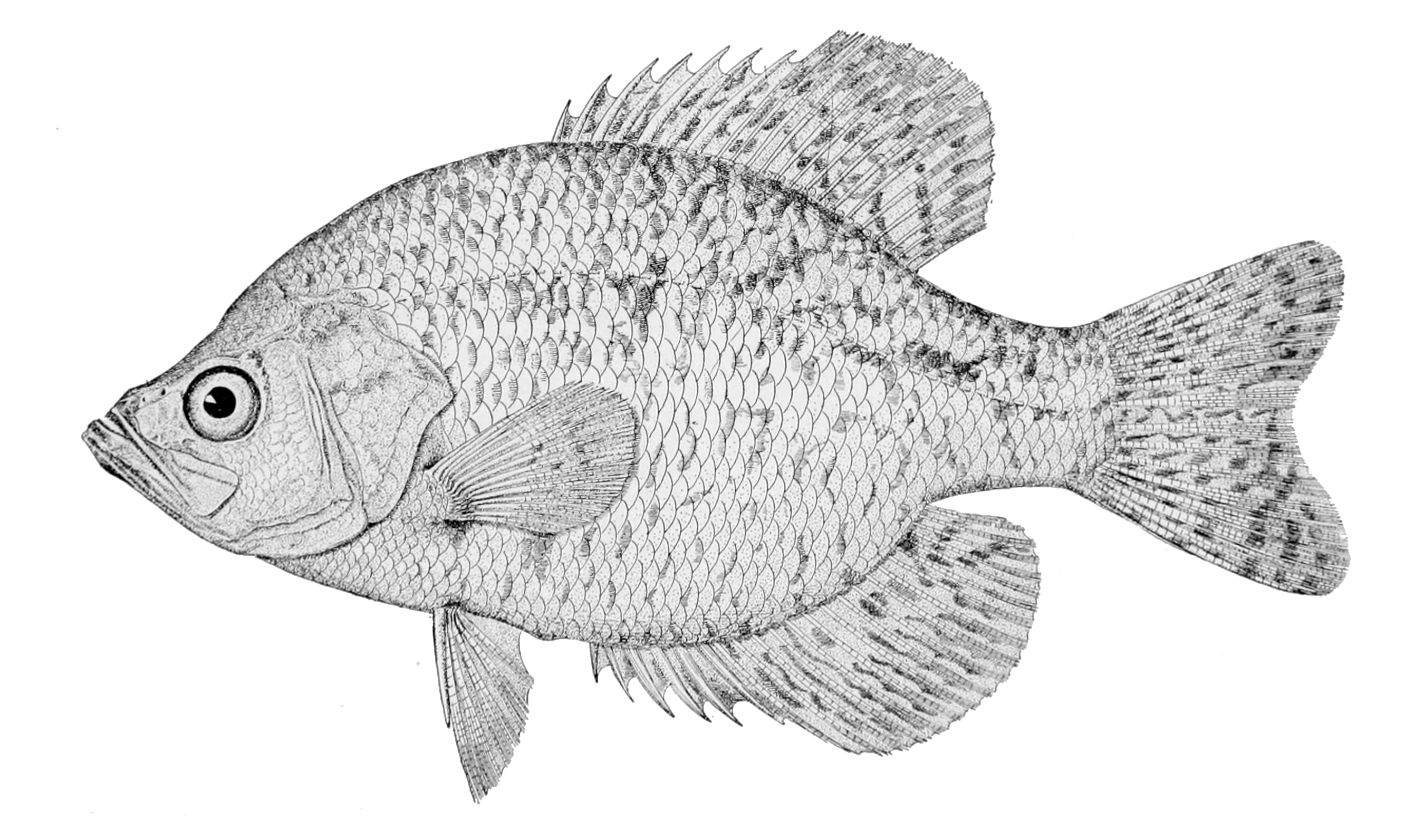
Black crappie live in Little Osakis Lake.

Little Osakis has a maximum depth of forty-three feet. Fish species residing in Little Osakis include black bullhead, black crappie, bluegill, brown bullhead, hybrid sunfish, largemouth bass, northern pike, pumpkinseed, rock bass, walleye, yellow bullhead, yellow perch, bowfin (dogfish), common carp, and white sucker.

== Demographics ==
As of the census of 2000, there were 690 people, 287 households, and 198 families residing in the township. The population density was 20.0 inhabitants per square mile (7.7/km^{2}). There were 619 housing units at an average density of 17.9 per square mile (6.9/km^{2}). The racial makeup of the township was 97.10% White, 0.58% Native American, 2.17% Asian, and 0.14% from two or more races. Hispanic or Latino of any race were 0.58% of the population.

There were 287 households, out of which 21.6% had children under the age of 18 living with them, 64.1% were married couples living together, 3.5% had a female householder with no husband present, and 30.7% were non-families. 25.8% of all households were made up of individuals, and 9.1% had someone living alone who was 65 years of age or older. The average household size was 2.40 and the average family size was 2.92.

In the township the population was spread out, with 23.6% under the age of 18, 3.9% from 18 to 24, 19.6% from 25 to 44, 35.4% from 45 to 64, and 17.5% who were 65 years of age or older. The median age was 47 years. For every 100 females, there were 119.7 males. For every 100 females age 18 and over, there were 111.6 males.

The median income for a household in the township was $31,324, and the median income for a family was $40,000. Males had a median income of $30,938 versus $22,000 for females. The per capita income for the township was $21,344. About 9.9% of families and 7.6% of the population were below the poverty line, including 2.7% of those under age 18 and 17.4% of those age 65 or over.
