= Swan River, Minnesota =

Swan River is the name of some communities in the U.S. state of Minnesota:

- Swan River, Itasca County, Minnesota, an unincorporated community in northern Minnesota
- Swan River Township, Morrison County, Minnesota, a township in central Minnesota
