= Long Prairie =

Long Prairie may refer to a location in the United States:

- Long Prairie, Minnesota
- Long Prairie River
- Long Prairie Township, Todd County, Minnesota
- Long Prairie Township, Mississippi County, Missouri
