= Reynolds Township =

Reynolds Township may refer to:

== Canada ==
- Reynolds Township, in Timiskaming District, Ontario

== United States ==
- Reynolds Township, Greene County, Arkansas, in Greene County, Arkansas
- Reynolds Township, Lee County, Illinois
- Reynolds Township, Montcalm County, Michigan
- Reynolds Township, Todd County, Minnesota
