= Turtle Creek Township =

Turtle Creek Township may refer to the following townships in the United States:

- Turtle Creek Township, Shelby County, Ohio
- Turtle Creek Township, Todd County, Minnesota

== See also ==
- Turtlecreek Township, Warren County, Ohio
