= Ward Springs, Minnesota =

Ward Springs
- Unincorporated community
- Location within Minnesota Location within the United States
- Coordinates: 45°47′31″N 94°48′18″W
- Country: United States
- State: Minnesota
- County: Todd
- Township: Birchdale Township
- Elevation: 1,220 ft (370 m)
- Time zone: UTC-6 (Central (CST))
  - Summer (DST): UTC-5 (CDT)
- ZIP code: 56336 and 56378
- Area code: 320
- GNIS feature ID: 653777

Ward Springs is an unincorporated community in Birchdale Township, Todd County, Minnesota, United States. It is along State Highway 28 (MN 28) near Todd County Roads 2 and 19. Nearby places include Grey Eagle, Melrose, and Sauk Centre.

== History ==
Ward Springs was originally called Birch Lake City. The present name is for the community's founders, J. W. and Martha J. Ward. A post office called Birch Lake was established in 1882, the name was changed to Ward Springs in 1909, and the post office closed in 1959.
