= Little Sauk Lake =

Lake in the state of Minnesota, United States

- Location within Minnesota
- Location: Todd County, Minnesota
- Coordinates: 45°51.5′N 94°59′W
- Type: lake

Little Sauk Lake is a lake in Todd County, in the U.S. state of Minnesota.

Little Sauk Lake was named for a colony of Sauk Indians who lived in the area.

== See also ==
- List of lakes in Minnesota
