= Dower Lake =

Lake in the state of Minnesota, United States

- Location within Minnesota Location within the United States
- Location: Todd County, Minnesota
- Coordinates: 46°21′4″N 94°51′9″W
- Type: lake
- Basin countries: United States
- Surface elevation: 391 m (1,283 ft)

Dower Lake is a lake in Todd County, in the U.S. state of Minnesota.

Dower Lake was named for Sampson Dower, an English settler.

== See also ==
- List of lakes in Minnesota
