= Grey Eagle Township, Todd County, Minnesota =

Grey Eagle Township, Minnesota
- Township
- Location within the state of Minnesota Grey Eagle Township, Minnesota (the United States)
- Coordinates: 45°47′59″N 94°42′20″W
- Country: United States
- State: Minnesota
- County: Todd

Area
  - Total: 29.3 sq mi (75.8 km^{2})
  - Land: 25.1 sq mi (64.9 km^{2})
  - Water: 4.2 sq mi (10.8 km^{2})
- Elevation: 1,300 ft (400 m)

Population (2020)
  - Total: 556
  - Density: 26/sq mi (10.2/km^{2})
- Time zone: UTC-6 (Central (CST))
  - Summer (DST): UTC-5 (CDT)
- ZIP code: 56336
- Area code: 320
- FIPS code: 27-26018
- GNIS feature ID: 0664356

Grey Eagle Township is a township in Todd County, Minnesota, United States. The population was 663 at the 2000 census and 556 at the 2020 census.

Grey Eagle Township was organized in 1873, and named for the fact that a pioneer hunter had shot an eagle there.

== Geography ==
According to the United States Census Bureau, the township has an area of 29.2 square miles (76 km^{2}), of which 25.1 square miles (65 km^{2}) is land and 4.2 square miles (11 km^{2}) (14.29%) is water.

=== Lakes ===
Grey Eagle Township has several lakes, including the 270-acre Mound Lake in its northeast corner. Mound Lake, which has a public boat access on its southwest shore, has a maximum depth of 57 feet. Fish species found in the lake include black bullhead, black crappie, bluegill, brown bullhead, green sunfish, hybrid sunfish, largemouth bass, northern pike, pumpkinseed, rock bass, smallmouth bass, walleye, yellow bullhead, yellow perch, bowfin (dogfish), white sucker, banded killifish, blackchin shiner, blacknose shiner, bluntnose minnow, brassy minnow, brook stickleback, central mudminnow, fathead minnow, golden shiner, Iowa darter, Johnny darter, least darter, northern redbelly dace, and tadpole madtom. Little Mound Lake is not far from Mound Lake's northeast corner.

=== Wildlife Management Areas ===
East of Mound Lake, and not far from Grey Eagle, is the 449-acre Oak Ridge Wildlife Management Area. The Minnesota Department of Natural Resources describes this WMA as a mostly wooded area with oak and aspen woodlands. There are small open water wetlands and some grassy fields.

West of Mound Lake is the 156-acre Buckthorn Lake Wildlife Management Area. The DNR describes this area as consisting of a mosaic of rolling hardwood hills with grasslands and a few smaller emergent wetlands. The WMA borders Buckthorn Lake on its eastern shore.

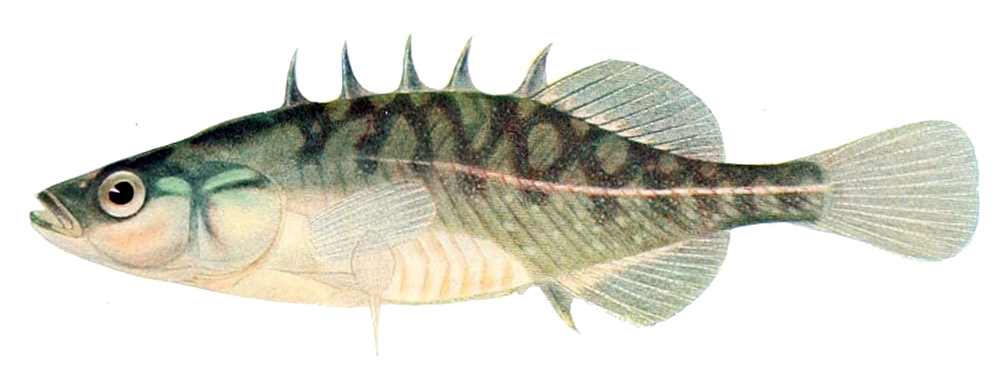
Living in Mound Lake, the Brook Stickleback prefers clean and clear water.

== Demographics ==
As of the census of 2000, there were 663 people, 257 households, and 205 families residing in the township. The population density was 26.4 inhabitants per square mile (10.2/km^{2}). There were 576 housing units at an average density of 23.0 per square mile (8.9/km^{2}). The racial makeup of the township was 99.85% White and 0.15% Asian.

There were 257 households, out of which 27.6% had children under the age of 18 living with them, 72.4% were married couples living together, 4.3% had a female householder with no husband present, and 20.2% were non-families. 19.5% of all households were made up of individuals, and 9.3% had someone living alone who was 65 years of age or older. The average household size was 2.58 and the average family size was 2.93.

In the township the population was spread out, with 24.3% under the age of 18, 4.8% from 18 to 24, 22.9% from 25 to 44, 27.3% from 45 to 64, and 20.7% who were 65 years of age or older. The median age was 43 years. For every 100 females, there were 101.5 males. For every 100 females age 18 and over, there were 105.7 males.

The median income for a household in the township was $41,923, and the median income for a family was $47,778. Males had a median income of $28,833 versus $19,853 for females. The per capita income for the township was $20,151. About 5.0% of families and 8.8% of the population were below the poverty line, including 14.2% of those under age 18 and 4.8% of those age 65 or over.
