= McCarrahan Lake =

Lake in the state of Minnesota, United States

- Location within Minnesota
- Location: Todd County, Minnesota
- Coordinates: 45°57′15″N 94°55′17″W
- Type: lake

McCarrahan Lake is a lake in Todd County, in the U.S. state of Minnesota.

McCarrahan Lake was named after William McCarrahan, an early settler.

== See also ==
- List of lakes in Minnesota
