= Swan River Township, Morrison County, Minnesota =

Swan River Township, Minnesota
- Township
- Location within the state of Minnesota Swan River Township, Minnesota (the United States)
- Coordinates: 45°53′3″N 94°25′16″W
- Country: United States
- State: Minnesota
- County: Morrison

Area
  - Total: 37.8 sq mi (97.8 km^{2})
  - Land: 36.9 sq mi (95.6 km^{2})
  - Water: 0.85 sq mi (2.2 km^{2})
- Elevation: 1,180 ft (360 m)

Population (2000)
  - Total: 755
  - Density: 20/sq mi (7.9/km^{2})
- Time zone: UTC-6 (Central (CST))
  - Summer (DST): UTC-5 (CDT)
- FIPS code: 27-63760
- GNIS feature ID: 0665749

Swan River Township is a township in Morrison County, Minnesota, United States. The population was 755 at the 2000 census.

== History ==
Swan River Township was organized in 1873 although settlers arrived in the area as early 1857. The township is named after the Swan River.

== Geography ==
According to the United States Census Bureau, the township has a total area of 37.8 square miles (97.8 km^{2}), of which 36.9 square miles (95.6 km^{2}) is land and 0.9 square mile (2.2 km^{2}) (2.25%) is water.

Minnesota State Highway 238 serves as a main route in the township.

== Demographics ==
As of the census (United States Census Bureau's 2000 Census), there were 755 people, 238 households, and 197 families residing in the township. The population density was 20.5 people per square mile (7.9/km^{2}). There were 253 housing units at an average density of 6.9/sq mi (2.6/km^{2}). The racial makeup of the township was 99.87% White, and 0.13% from two or more races. Hispanic or Latino of any race were 0.26% of the population.

There were 238 households, out of which 41.2% had children under the age of 18 living with them, 71.4% were married couples living together, 5.0% had a female householder with no husband present, and 17.2% were non-families. 16.4% of all households were made up of individuals, and 4.6% had someone living alone who was 65 years of age or older. The average household size was 3.17 and the average family size was 3.54.

In the township the population was spread out, with 30.9% under the age of 18, 9.9% from 18 to 24, 27.4% from 25 to 44, 22.1% from 45 to 64, and 9.7% who were 65 years of age or older. The median age was 36 years. For every 100 females, there were 125.4 males. For every 100 females age 18 and over, there were 116.6 males.

The median income for a household in the township was $45,536, and the median income for a family was $50,893. Males had a median income of $30,682 versus $23,382 for females. The per capita income for the township was $14,819. About 4.6% of families and 6.9% of the population were below the poverty line, including 4.6% of those under age 18 and 16.1% of those age 65 or over.
