= Eagle Valley Township, Todd County, Minnesota =

Eagle Valley Township, Minnesota
- Township
- Location within the state of Minnesota Eagle Valley Township, Minnesota (the United States)
- Coordinates: 46°8′27″N 94°57′18″W
- Country: United States
- State: Minnesota
- County: Todd

Area
  - Total: 35.1 sq mi (91.0 km^{2})
  - Land: 35.1 sq mi (91.0 km^{2})
  - Water: 0 sq mi (0.0 km^{2})
- Elevation: 1,380 ft (420 m)

Population (2020)
  - Total: 487
  - Density: 16/sq mi (6.3/km^{2})
- Time zone: UTC-6 (Central (CST))
  - Summer (DST): UTC-5 (CDT)
- FIPS code: 27-17450
- GNIS feature ID: 0664020

Eagle Valley Township is a township in Todd County, Minnesota, United States. The population was 570 at the 2000 census. By the 2020 Census the population had fallen to 487. The township is named for Eagle Creek, which flows through it. Eagle Creek is in turned for the Bald Eagle

== Geography ==
According to the United States Census Bureau, the township has a total area of 35.1 square miles (91 km^{2}), all land.

== Demographics ==
As of the census of 2000, there were 570 people, 196 households, and 145 families residing in the township. The population density was 16.2 inhabitants per square mile (6.3/km^{2}). There were 215 housing units at an average density of 6.1 units per square mile (2.4 units/km^{2}). The racial makeup of the township was 98.77% White, 0.35% African American, 0.18% Native American, and 0.70% from two or more races.

There were 196 households, out of which 41.3% had children under the age of 18 living with them, 67.9% were married couples living together, 2.6% had a female householder with no husband present, and 26.0% were non-families. 22.4% of all households were made up of individuals, and 9.2% had someone living alone who was 65 years of age or older. The average household size was 2.91 and the average family size was 3.46.

In the township the population was spread out, with 32.3% under the age of 18, 6.7% from 18 to 24, 24.4% from 25 to 44, 26.5% from 45 to 64, and 10.2% who were 65 years of age or older. The median age was 36 years. For every 100 females, there were 124.4 males. For every 100 females age 18 and over, there were 118.1 males.

The median income for a household in the township was $35,000, and the median income for a family was $39,688. Males had a median income of $30,804 versus $20,625 for females. The per capita income for the township was $19,877. About 11.0% of families and 11.1% of the population were below the poverty line, including 10.2% of those under age 18 and 17.2% of those age 65 or over.
