= Bruce Township, Todd County, Minnesota =

Bruce Township, Minnesota
- Township
- Location within the state of Minnesota Bruce Township, Minnesota (the United States)
- Coordinates: 45°58′10″N 94°42′51″W
- Country: United States
- State: Minnesota
- County: Todd

Area
  - Total: 36.1 sq mi (93.4 km^{2})
  - Land: 35.3 sq mi (91.3 km^{2})
  - Water: 0.81 sq mi (2.1 km^{2})
- Elevation: 1,266 ft (386 m)

Population (2020)
  - Total: 479
  - Density: 16/sq mi (6.2/km^{2})
- Time zone: UTC-6 (Central (CST))
  - Summer (DST): UTC-5 (CDT)
- FIPS code: 27-08272
- GNIS feature ID: 0663688

Bruce Township is a township in Todd County, Minnesota, United States. The population was 564 at the 2000 census but had declined to 479 by the 2020 census.

== History ==
Bruce Township was named for Robert the Bruce, King of the Scots. The name was suggested by Bruce township resident George Balmer, a Scotsman and Todd County Commissioner.

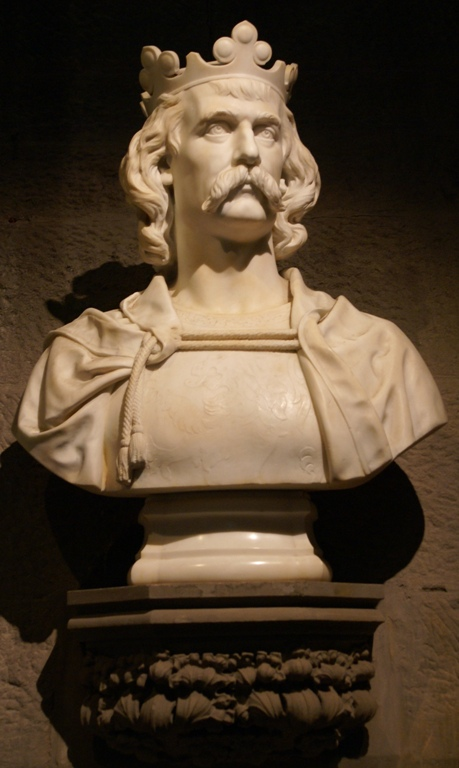
A bust of Robert Bruce, King of Scots. The township is named for him.

== Geography ==
According to the United States Census Bureau, the township has a total area of 36.0 square miles (93 km^{2}), of which 35.2 square miles (91 km^{2}) is land and 0.8 square miles (2.1 km^{2}) (2.25%) is water. Lake Beauty is in Bruce township. It's 137 acres.

=== Lakes ===
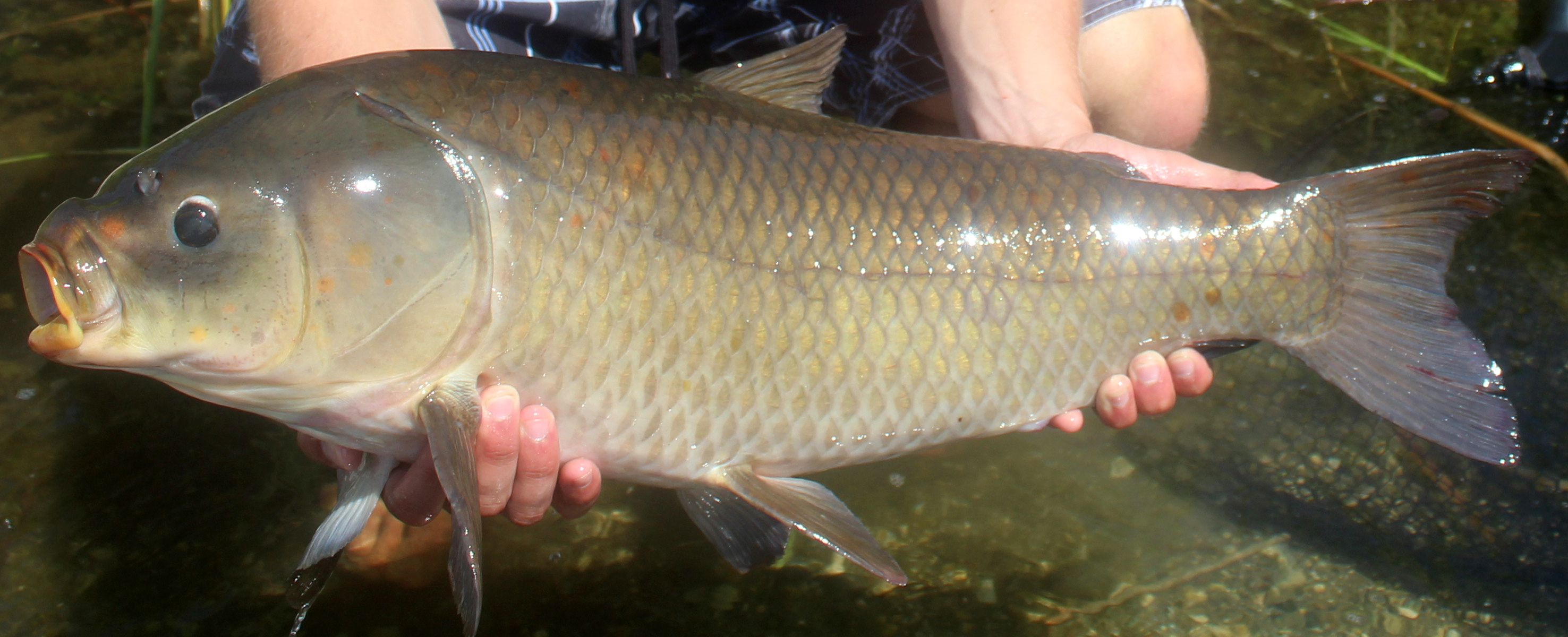
Bigmouth Buffalo can be found in Lake Beauty.

Beauty Lake is a 240-acre lake, mostly in section three of Bruce township. The lake has a maximum depth of 27 feet. There is a public access boat ramp on the southeast corner of the lake. Fish species in the lake include black bullhead, black crappie, bluegill, brown bullhead, green sunfish, hybrid sunfish, largemouth bass, northern pike, pumpkinseed, rock bass, walleye, yellow bullhead, yellow perch, bigmouth buffalo, bowfin (dogfish), common carp, white sucker, banded killifish, blacknose shiner, bluntnose minnow, central mudminnow, golden shiner, Iowa darter, Johnny darter, least darter, and tadpole madtom.

== Demographics ==
As of the census of 2000, there were 564 people, 211 households, and 155 families residing in the township. The population density was 16.0 inhabitants per square mile (6.2/km^{2}). There were 271 housing units at an average density of 7.7 units per square mile (3.0 units/km^{2}). The racial makeup of the township was 97.70% White, 0.18% Native American, 0.35% Asian, 1.06% from other races, and 0.71% from two or more races. Hispanic or Latino of any race were 2.30% of the population.

There were 211 households, out of which 32.7% had children under the age of 18 living with them, 65.4% were married couples living together, 2.8% had a female householder with no husband present, and 26.1% were non-families. 23.2% of all households were made up of individuals, and 10.4% had someone living alone who was 65 years of age or older. The average household size was 2.67 and the average family size was 3.17.

In the township the population was spread out, with 28.9% under the age of 18, 8.0% from 18 to 24, 25.5% from 25 to 44, 27.1% from 45 to 64, and 10.5% who were 65 years of age or older. The median age was 38 years. For every 100 females, there were 118.6 males. For every 100 females age 18 and over, there were 116.8 males.

The median income for a household in the township was $40,278, and the median income for a family was $45,625. Males had a median income of $31,458 versus $20,625 for females. The per capita income for the township was $15,762. About 5.2% of families and 11.9% of the population were below the poverty line, including 18.1% of those under age 18 and 27.3% of those age 65 or over.
