= Pillsbury, Minnesota =

Pillsbury
- Unincorporated community
- Location within Minnesota Location within the United States
- Coordinates: 45°56′00″N 94°41′01″W
- Country: United States
- State: Minnesota
- County: Todd
- Elevation: 1,184 ft (361 m)
- Time zone: UTC-6 (Central (CST))
  - Summer (DST): UTC-5 (CDT)
- Area code: 320
- GNIS feature ID: 649431

Pillsbury is an unincorporated community in Todd County, Minnesota, United States.
