= Wykeham Township, Todd County, Minnesota =

Wykeham Township, Minnesota
- Township
- Location within the state of Minnesota Wykeham Township, Minnesota (the United States)
- Coordinates: 46°8′44″N 95°4′15″W
- Country: United States
- State: Minnesota
- County: Todd

Area
  - Total: 35.0 sq mi (90.6 km^{2})
  - Land: 34.8 sq mi (90.2 km^{2})
  - Water: 0.15 sq mi (0.4 km^{2})
- Elevation: 1,421 ft (433 m)

Population (2020)
  - Total: 405
  - Density: 12/sq mi (4.8/km^{2})
- Time zone: UTC-6 (Central (CST))
  - Summer (DST): UTC-5 (CDT)
- FIPS code: 27-71932
- GNIS feature ID: 0666061

Wykeham Township is a township in Todd County, Minnesota, United States. Wykeham Township was originally called Eden Township and was organized in 1880 under the latter name. The township's name has its origins in England. Several post offices were briefly located in the township.

== Geography ==
According to the United States Census Bureau, the township has a total area of 35.0 square miles (90.6 km^{2}) of which 34.8 square miles (90.2 km^{2}) is land and 0.2 square miles (0.4 km^{2}) is water. The town of Eagle Bend is on the north eastern edge of the township.

== Demographics ==
As of the census of 2000, there were 436 people but that number had declined to 405 by the 2020 census. The 2000 census counted154 households, and 123 families residing in the township. The population density was 12.5 people per square mile (4.8 people/km^{2}). There were 177 housing units at an average density of 5.1 units per square mile (2.0 units/km^{2}). The racial makeup of the township was 98.85% White, 0.23% Native American, and 0.92% from two or more races. Hispanic or Latino of any race made up 1.38% of the population.

There were 154 households, of which 31.8% had children under the age of 18 living with them, 72.1% were married couples living together, 3.2% had a female householder with no husband present, and 20.1% were non-families. 16.2% of all households were made up of individuals, and 5.2% had someone living alone who was 65 years of age or older. The average household size was 2.83 and the average family size was 3.16.

In the township the population was spread out, with 28.2% under the age of 18, 8.0% from 18 to 24, 27.5% from 25 to 44, 25.5% from 45 to 64, and 10.8% from 65 or older. The median age was 38 years. For every 100 females, there were 109.6 males. For every 100 females age 18 and over, there were 114.4 males.

The median income for a household in the township was $31,250, and the median income for a family was $35,833. Males had a median income of $24,107 versus $18,438 for females. The per capita income for the township was $16,184. About 12.5% of families and 13.6% of the population were below the poverty line, 8.3% of which were under age 18; 25.0% of those were age 65 or over.
