= Little Sauk Township, Todd County, Minnesota =

Little Sauk Township, Minnesota
- Township
- Location within the state of Minnesota Little Sauk Township, Minnesota (the United States)
- Coordinates: 45°53′5″N 94°57′8″W
- Country: United States
- State: Minnesota
- County: Todd

Area
  - Total: 35.8 sq mi (92.8 km^{2})
  - Land: 34.2 sq mi (88.6 km^{2})
  - Water: 1.6 sq mi (4.2 km^{2})
- Elevation: 1,352 ft (412 m)

Population (2020)
  - Total: 873
  - Density: 23/sq mi (8.7/km^{2})
- Time zone: UTC-6 (Central (CST))
  - Summer (DST): UTC-5 (CDT)
- ZIP code: 56347
- Area code: 320
- FIPS code: 27-37718
- GNIS feature ID: 0664807

Little Sauk Township is a township in Todd County, Minnesota, United States. The population was 769 at the 2000 census. By the 2020 census the population had grown to 873.

Little Sauk Township was organized in 1870. A village of the same name is located in section 26 of the township. The village is on the Sauk River. A post office was opened in 1872 and the village hosted a Great Northern Railway depot. The village was initially called Burlington.

== Geography ==
According to the United States Census Bureau, the township has a total area of 35.8 square miles (92.8 km^{2}), of which 34.2 square miles (88.6 km^{2}) is land and 1.6 square miles (4.2 km^{2}) (4.49%) is water.

== Demographics ==
As of the census of 2000, there were 769 people, 247 households, and 185 families residing in the township. The population density was 22.5 inhabitants per square mile (8.7/km^{2}). There were 331 housing units at an average density of 9.7 per square mile (3.7/km^{2}). The racial makeup of the township was 98.44% White, 1.43% Asian, and 0.13% from two or more races. Hispanic or Latino of any race were 1.43% of the population.

There were 247 households, out of which 36.4% had children under the age of 18 living with them, 69.6% were married couples living together, 3.6% had a female householder with no husband present, and 25.1% were non-families. 21.1% of all households were made up of individuals, and 8.9% had someone living alone who was 65 years of age or older. The average household size was 2.95 and the average family size was 3.46.

In the township the population was spread out, with 30.9% under the age of 18, 8.2% from 18 to 24, 26.7% from 25 to 44, 21.7% from 45 to 64, and 12.5% who were 65 years of age or older. The median age was 36 years. For every 100 females, there were 113.6 males. For every 100 females age 18 and over, there were 114.1 males.

The median income for a household in the township was $39,875, and the median income for a family was $44,167. Males had a median income of $29,911 versus $20,268 for females. The per capita income for the township was $13,119. About 8.1% of families and 18.4% of the population were below the poverty line, including 19.2% of those under age 18 and 12.0% of those age 65 or over.
