= Swan River (central Minnesota) =

- Mouth of the Swan River

Location
- Country: United States
- State: Minnesota
- Counties: Morrison, Todd

Physical characteristics
- Source
  - location: Big Swan Lake
  - coordinates: 45.9074651°N 94.7461281°W
- Mouth
  - coordinates: 45°55′10″N 94°23′08″W
  - elevation: 1,082 ft (330 m)
- Length: 37 mi (60 km)

Basin features
- River system: Mississippi River

The Swan River is a 37.0-mile-long (59.5 km) tributary of the Mississippi River that flows through Todd and Morrison counties of the U.S. state of Minnesota. It passes through Swanville and Sobieski before entering the Mississippi 4 miles (6 km) south of the city of Little Falls.

Swan River is the English translation of the native Ojibwe language name given for two types of swans seen in the area: the trumpeter swan and the whistling swan.

== See also ==
- List of rivers of Minnesota
- List of longest streams of Minnesota
