= Staples Township, Todd County, Minnesota =

Staples Township, Minnesota
- Township
- Location within the state of Minnesota Staples Township, Minnesota (the United States)
- Coordinates: 46°19′40″N 94°49′44″W
- Country: United States
- State: Minnesota
- County: Todd

Area
  - Total: 33.9 sq mi (87.7 km^{2})
  - Land: 32.7 sq mi (84.7 km^{2})
  - Water: 1.2 sq mi (3.0 km^{2})
- Elevation: 1,286 ft (392 m)

Population (2020)
  - Total: 597
  - Density: 19/sq mi (7.3/km^{2})
- Time zone: UTC-6 (Central (CST))
  - Summer (DST): UTC-5 (CDT)
- ZIP code: 56479
- Area code: 218
- FIPS code: 27-62464
- GNIS feature ID: 0665697

Staples Township is a township in Todd County, Minnesota, United States. The population was 622 at the 2000 census and in the 2020 census it was 597.

Staples Township was organized in 1882, and named for Samuel and Isaac Staples, businessmen in the lumber industry. The Staples brothers arrived in Minnesota from Maine and came to Staples via Stillwater, MN. Staples is also a town in the township. Part of the town of Staples is in Todd County and part of it is in Wadena County.

== Geography ==
According to the United States Census Bureau, the township has a total area of 33.9 square miles (87.7 km^{2}); 32.7 square miles (84.7 km^{2}) is land and 1.1 square miles (3.0 km^{2}) (3.40%) is water.

=== Dower Lake ===
Dower Lake is an 84 acre lake with a maximum depth of 34 feet. Fish species residing in the lake include black bullhead, black crappie, bluegill, brown bullhead, hybrid sunfish, largemouth bass, northern pike, pumpkinseed, walleye, yellow bullhead, yellow perch, bowfin (dogfish), white sucker, and golden shiner.

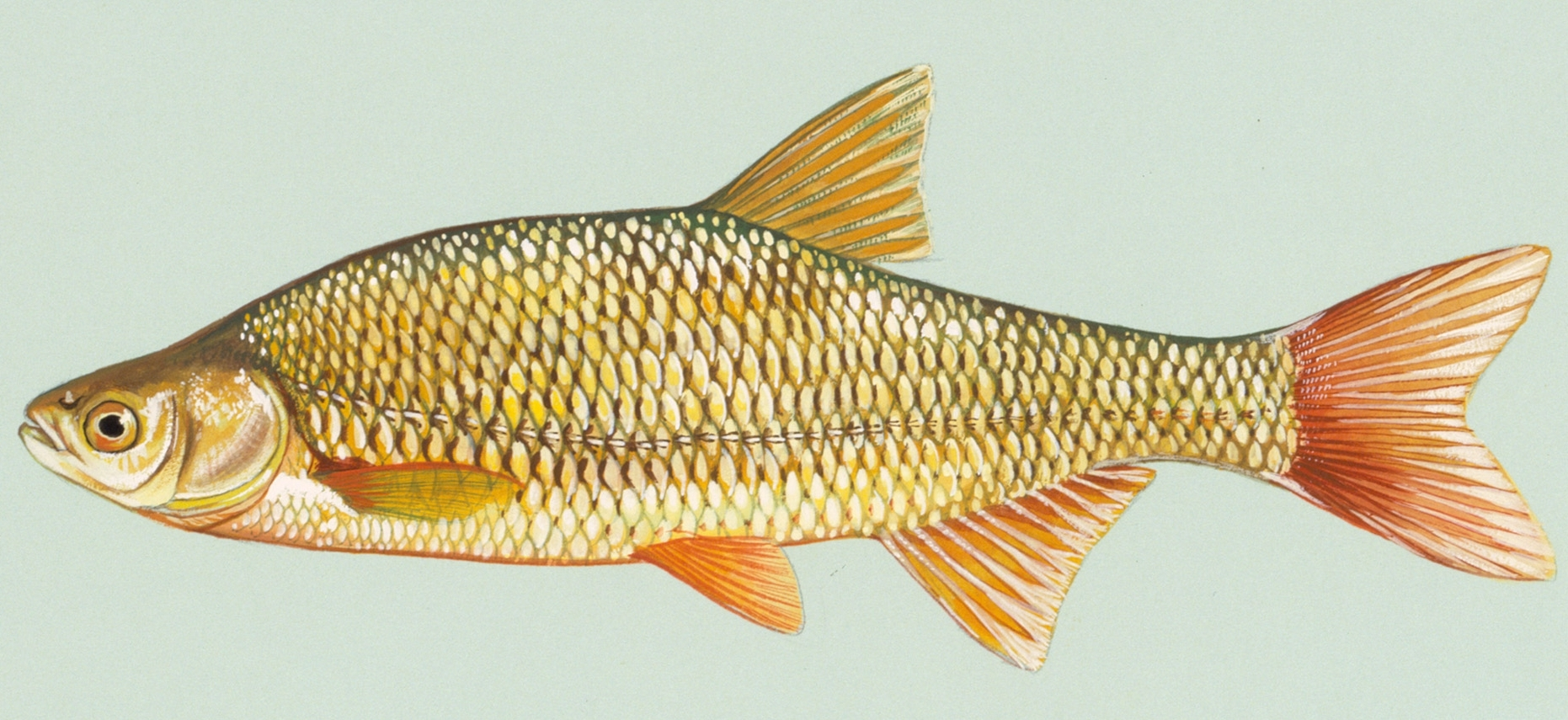
Golden Shiner live in the waters of Dower Lake.

Two miles west of the town of Staples, on the shores of Dower Lake, is the 54 acre Dower Lake Recreation Area. The area is owned by the City of Staples and features a softball complex, 9-hole disc golf course, basketball court, swimming beach, sand volleyball court, horseshoe pits, picnic shelter, picnic areas, public lake access and Minnesota’s longest fishing pier, measuring 612 feet.

A few miles northwest of Dower Lake is the Dower Lake Wildlife Management Area, managed by the Minnesota DNR. The 40 acre WMA is open water wetland with surrounding cattails and low land grass and brush areas.

=== Staples Wildlife Management Area ===
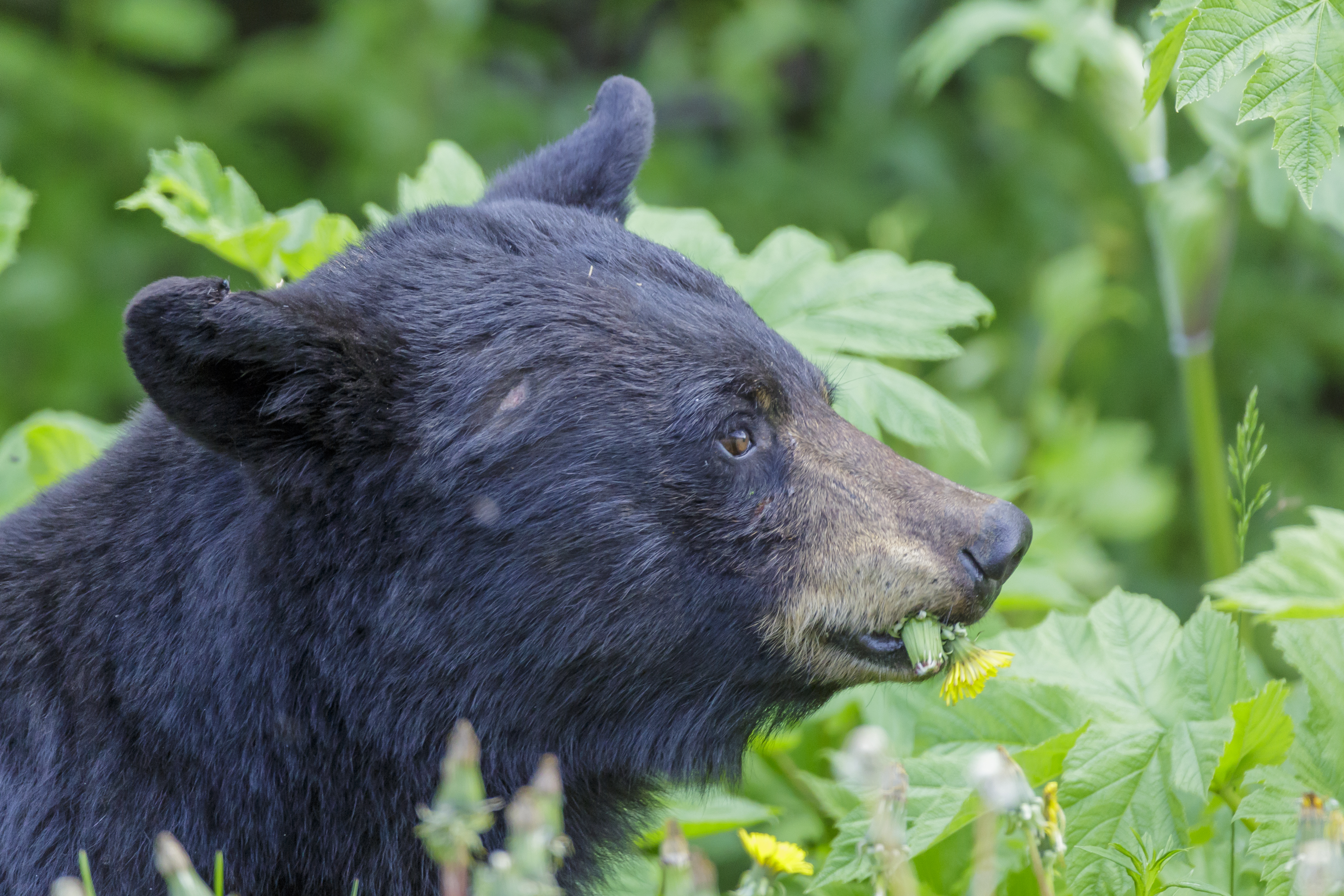
The American Black Bear lives in the Staples WMA.

This 1,428.41 acre WMA is in the south eastern corner of the township. Wildlife species in the Staples WMA include Whitetail Deer, Black Bear, Small Game, Forest Upland Birds, Waterfowl, and Wild Turkey.

This Wildlife Management area has grassland and restored wetlandas well as woodlands made up of hardwood and mixed conifer-hardwood trees.

== Demographics ==
As of the census of 2000, there were 622 people, 233 households, and 172 families residing in the township. The population density was 19.0 people per square mile (7.3/km^{2}). There were 274 housing units at an average density of 8.4/sq mi (3.2/km^{2}). The racial makeup of the township was 96.46% White, 0.16% African American, 1.29% Native American, 0.16% Asian, and 1.93% from two or more races. Hispanic or Latino of any race were 1.13% of the population.

There were 233 households, out of which 29.2% had children under the age of 18 living with them, 63.9% were married couples living together, 7.3% had a female householder with no husband present, and 25.8% were non-families. 21.5% of all households were made up of individuals, and 9.4% had someone living alone who was 65 years of age or older. The average household size was 2.67 and the average family size was 3.11.

In the township the population was spread out, with 23.3% under the age of 18, 10.3% from 18 to 24, 24.6% from 25 to 44, 26.5% from 45 to 64, and 15.3% who were 65 years of age or older. The median age was 41 years. For every 100 females, there were 109.4 males. For every 100 females age 18 and over, there were 109.2 males.

The median income for a household in the township was $40,469, and the median income for a family was $47,583. Males had a median income of $28,250 versus $16,827 for females. The per capita income for the township was $15,711. About 5.2% of families and 6.3% of the population were below the poverty line, including 7.5% of those under age 18 and 2.0% of those age 65 or over.
