= Clarissa, Minnesota =

City in Minnesota, United States

City of Clarissa
- City
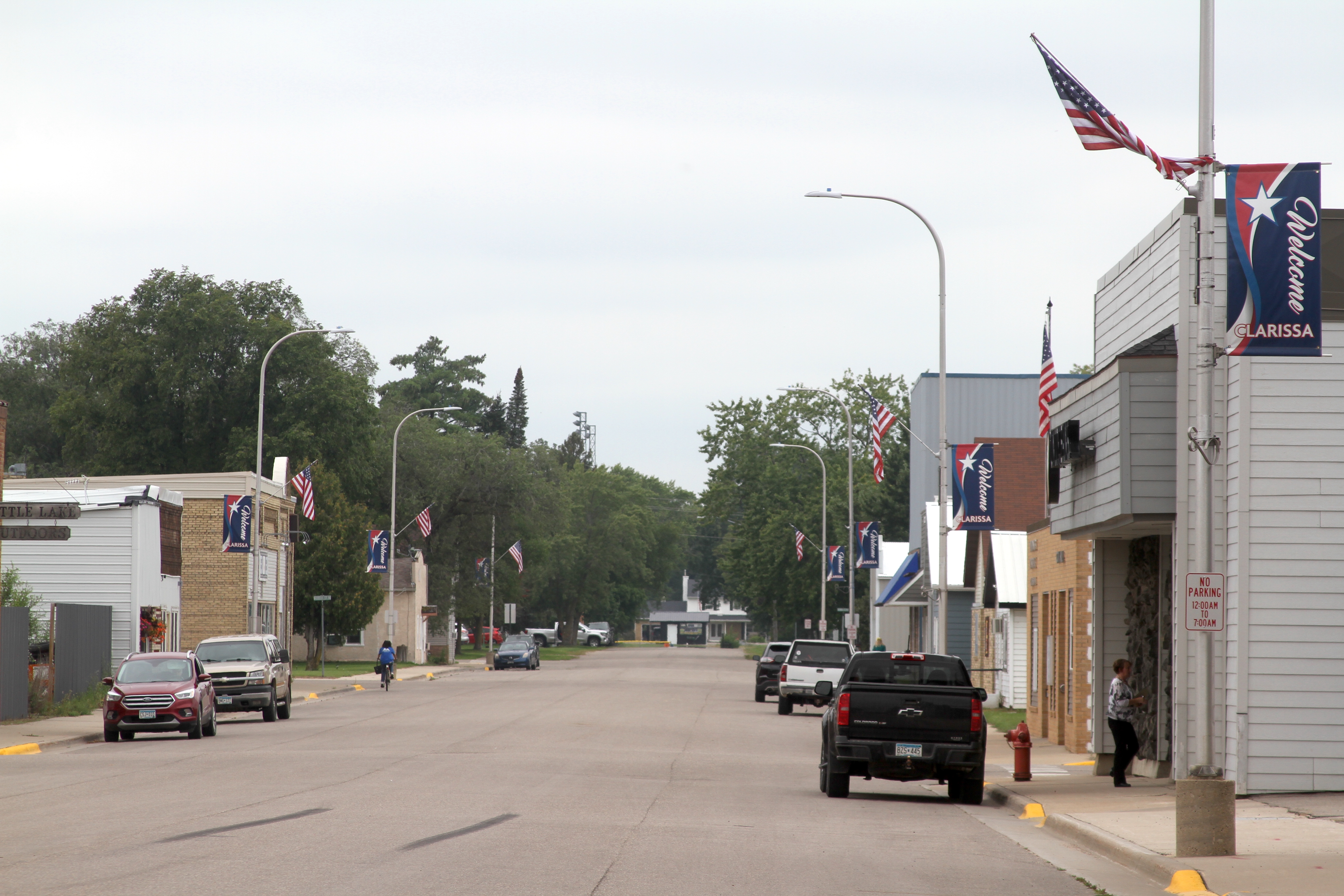
- Main Street

- Location of Clarissa, Minnesota

- Location of Clarissa, Minnesota
- Coordinates: 46°07′42″N 94°56′57″W
- Country: United States
- State: Minnesota
- County: Todd

Government
  - Mayor: Brent Line

Area
  - Total: 1.02 sq mi (2.63 km^{2})
  - Land: 1.02 sq mi (2.63 km^{2})
  - Water: 0 sq mi (0.00 km^{2})
- Elevation: 1,329 ft (405 m)

Population (2020)
  - Total: 661
  - Density: 651.4/sq mi (251.51/km^{2})
- Time zone: UTC-6 (CST)
  - Summer (DST): UTC-5 (CDT)
- ZIP code: 56440
- Area code: 218
- FIPS code: 27-11602
- GNIS feature ID: 2393536
- Website: cityofclarissa.weebly.com

Clarissa is a city in Todd County, Minnesota, United States. The population was 681 at the 2010 census. It dropped to 661 inhabitants by the 2020 census.

== History ==
Clarissa was platted in 1877, and named for Clarissa Bischoffsheim, the wife of the founder. A post office has been in operation at Clarissa since 1880. Clarissa was incorporated in 1897.

== Geography ==
According to the United States Census Bureau, the city has a total area of 1.00 square mile (2.59 km^{2}), all land.

== Demographics ==
Historical population
Census	Pop.	Note	%±
1900	233		—
1910	364		56.2%
1920	421		15.7%
1930	444		5.5%
1940	519		16.9%
1950	650		25.2%
1960	569		−12.5%
1970	599		5.3%
1980	663		10.7%
1990	637		−3.9%
2000	609		−4.4%
2010	681		11.8%
2020	661		−2.9%
U.S. Decennial Census

=== 2010 census ===
As of the census of 2010, there were 681 people, 291 households, and 160 families living in the city. The population density was 681.0 inhabitants per square mile (262.9/km^{2}). There were 323 housing units at an average density of 323.0 per square mile (124.7/km^{2}). The racial makeup of the city was 98.2% White, 0.4% African American, 0.1% Asian, and 1.2% from two or more races. Hispanic or Latino of any race were 0.7% of the population.

There were 291 households, of which 21.3% had children under the age of 18 living with them, 46.0% were married couples living together, 5.8% had a female householder with no husband present, 3.1% had a male householder with no wife present, and 45.0% were non-families. 42.6% of all households were made up of individuals, and 22.6% had someone living alone who was 65 years of age or older. The average household size was 2.07 and the average family size was 2.84.

The median age in the city was 50.1 years. 19.8% of residents were under the age of 18; 5.9% were between the ages of 18 and 24; 19.4% were from 25 to 44; 24.7% were from 45 to 64; and 30.2% were 65 years of age or older. The gender makeup of the city was 48.3% male and 51.7% female.

=== 2000 census ===
As of the census of 2000, there were 609 people, 256 households, and 142 families living in the city. The population density was 617.0 inhabitants per square mile (238.2/km^{2}). There were 292 housing units at an average density of 295.9 per square mile (114.2/km^{2}). The racial makeup of the city was 98.03% White, 0.16% African American, 0.49% Native American, 0.49% Asian, and 0.82% from two or more races. Hispanic or Latino of any race were 0.99% of the population.

There were 256 households, out of which 19.9% had children under the age of 18 living with them, 46.1% were married couples living together, 6.6% had a female householder with no husband present, and 44.5% were non-families. 40.6% of all households were made up of individuals, and 27.3% had someone living alone who was 65 years of age or older. The average household size was 2.04 and the average family size was 2.77.

In the city, the population was spread out, with 17.1% under the age of 18, 6.1% from 18 to 24, 17.9% from 25 to 44, 21.8% from 45 to 64, and 37.1% who were 65 years of age or older. The median age was 52 years. For every 100 females, there were 76.0 males. For every 100 females age 18 and over, there were 70.0 males.

The median income for a household in the city was $25,125, and the median income for a family was $38,553. Males had a median income of $27,500 versus $17,000 for females. The per capita income for the city was $14,913. About 3.6% of families and 8.3% of the population were below the poverty line, including 4.9% of those under age 18 and 9.7% of those age 65 or over.

== Gallery ==
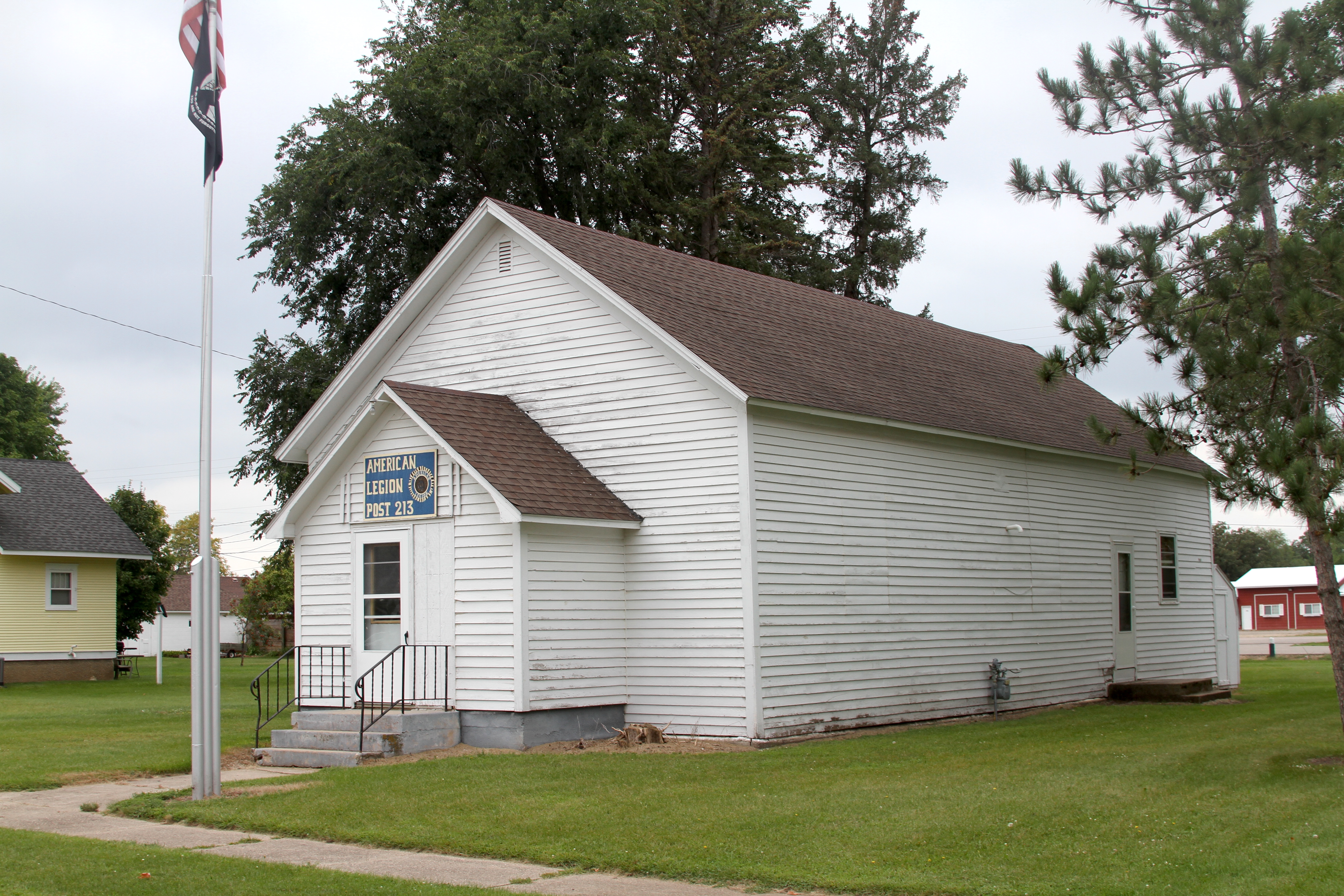
American Legion Post 213

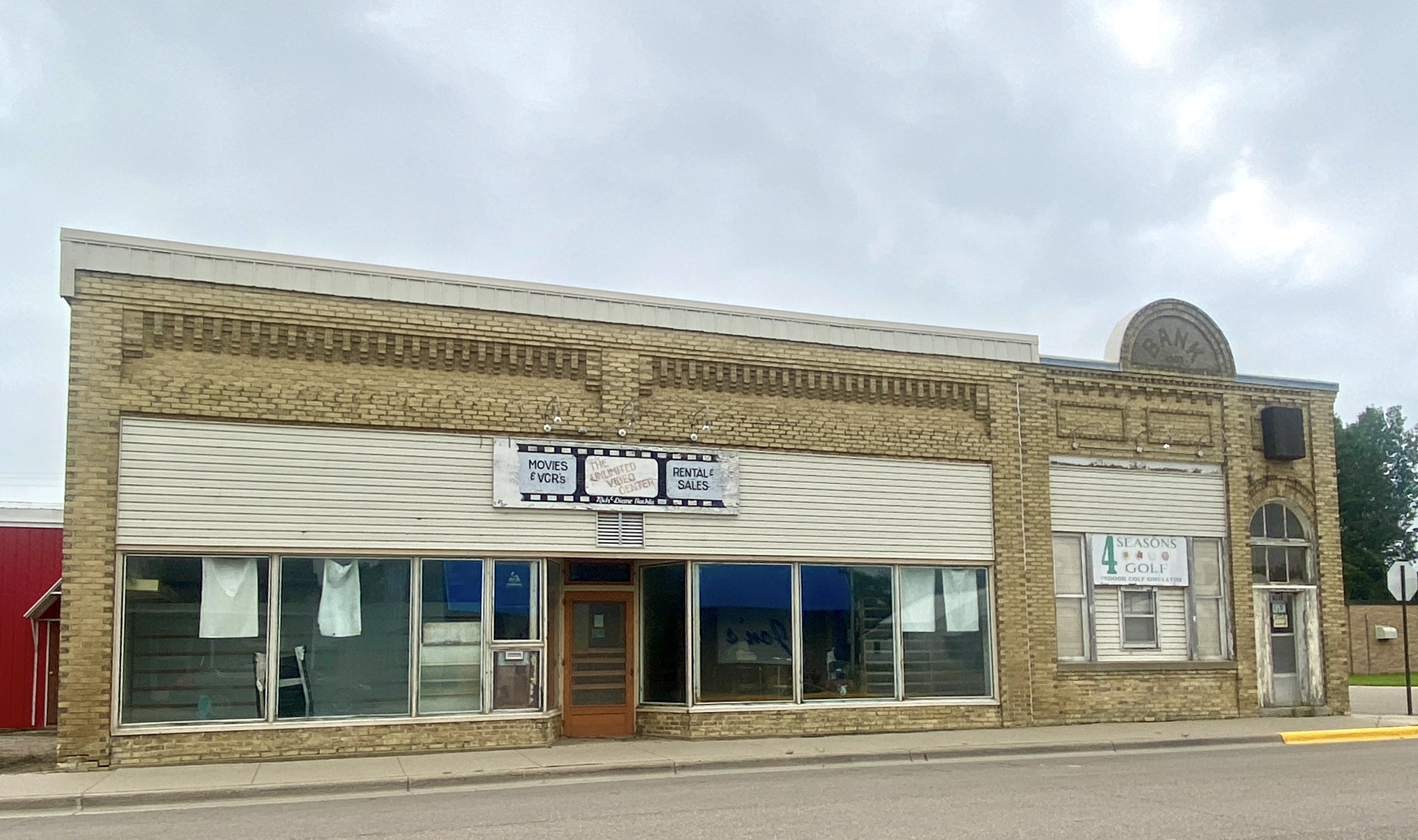
Former bank and hardware Store buildings

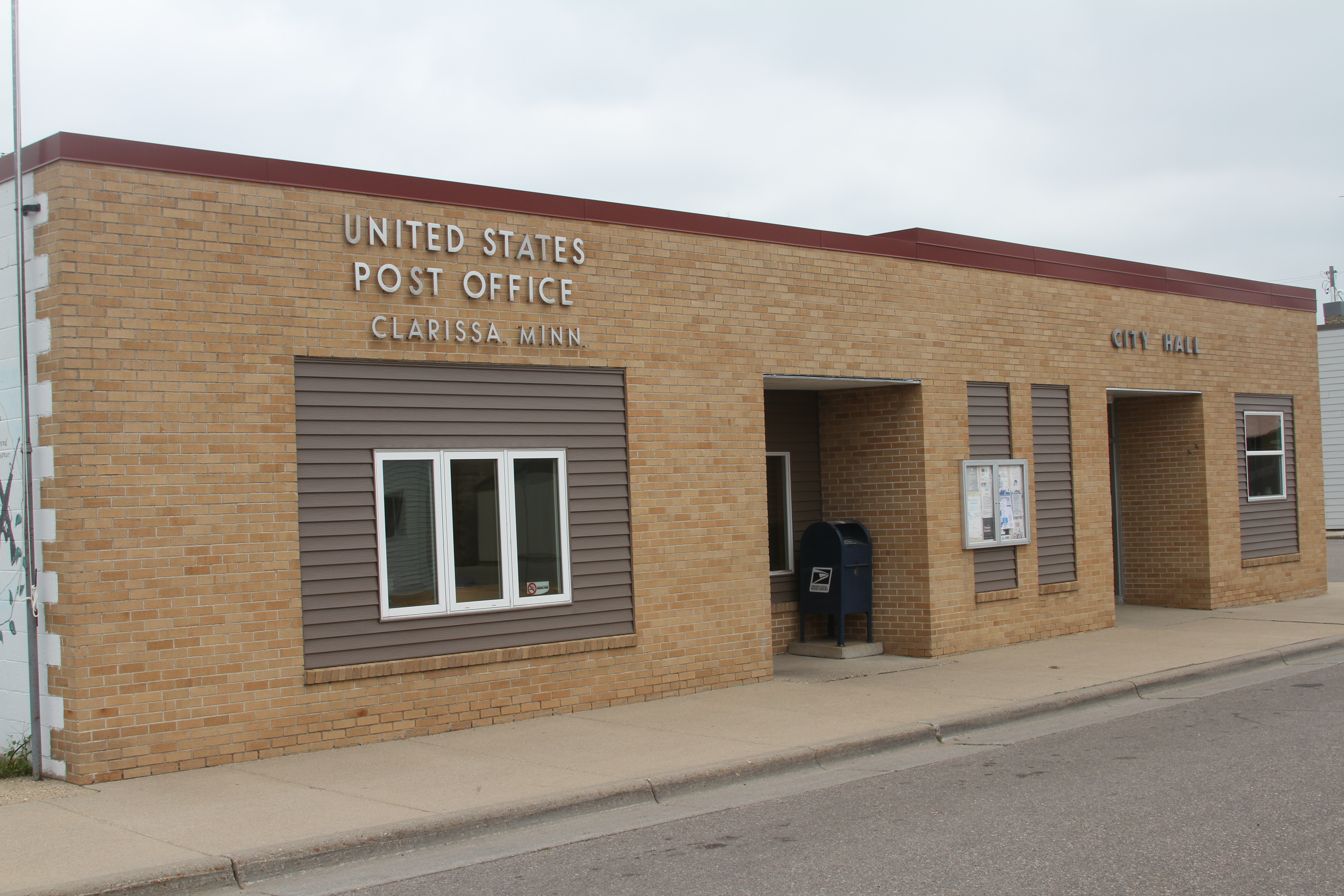
Post Office and City Hall building

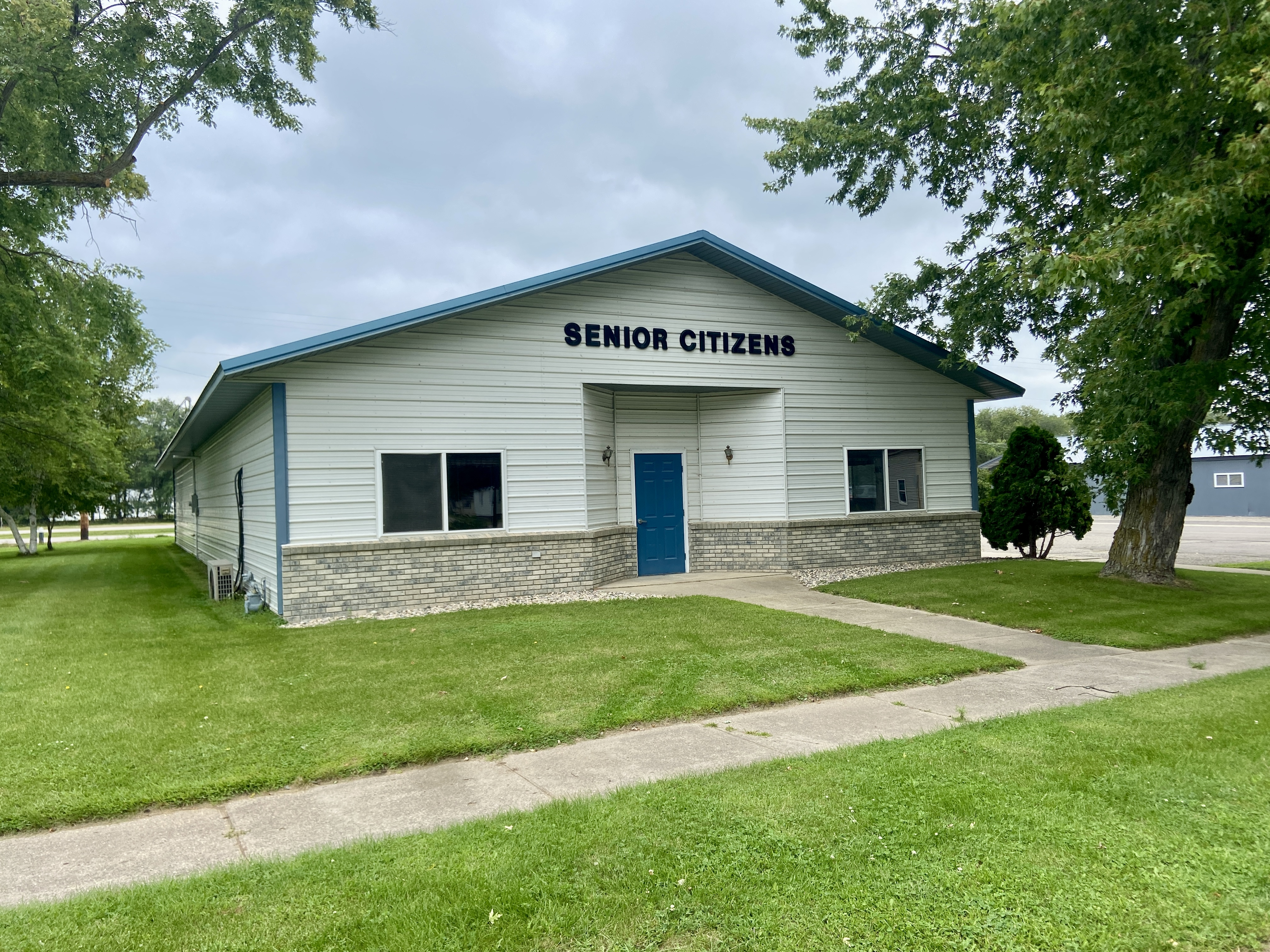
Senior Citizens Center

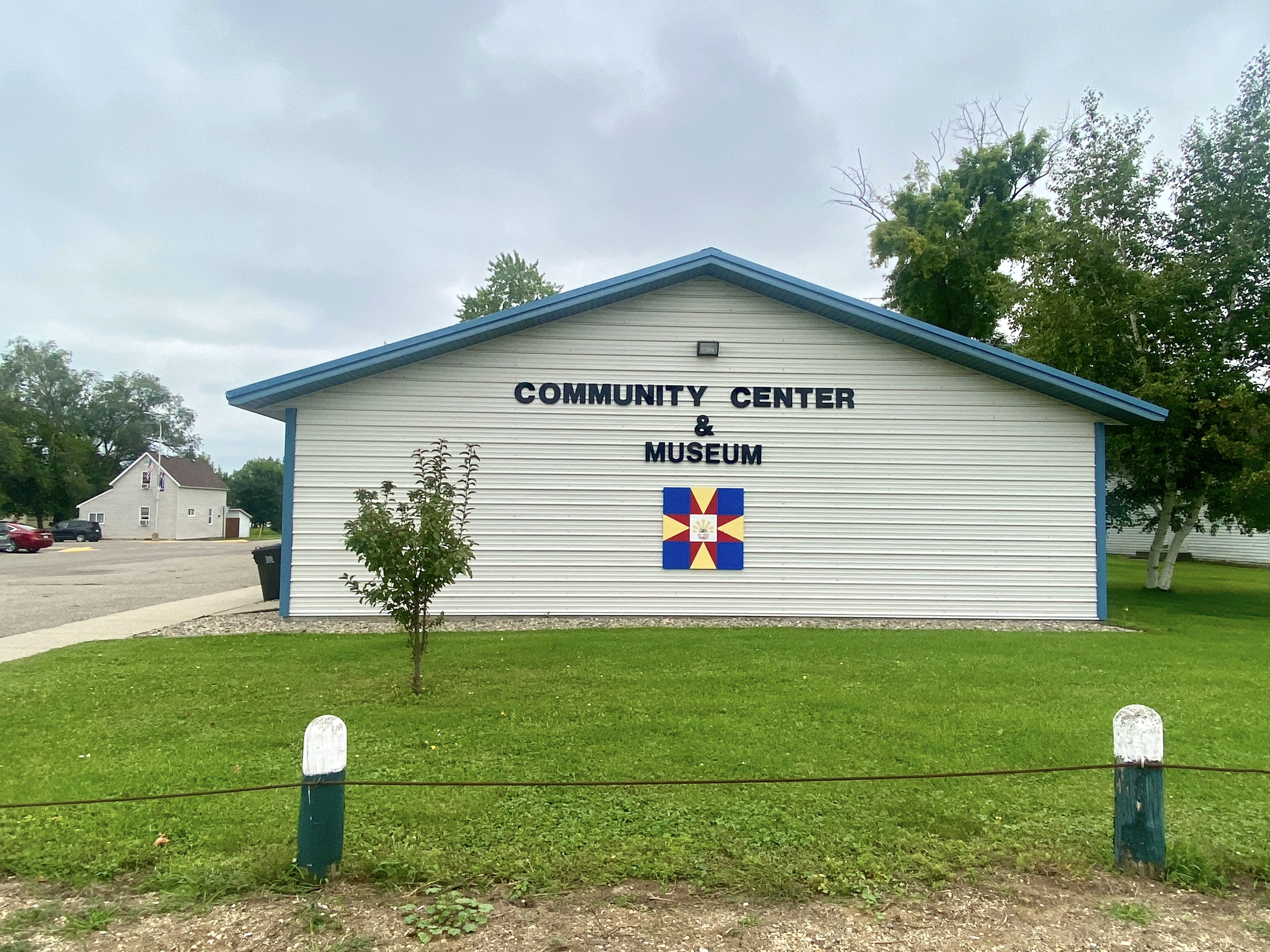
Clarissa Museum & Community Center
