= Gordon Township, Todd County, Minnesota =

Gordon Township, Minnesota
- Township
- Location within the state of Minnesota Gordon Township, Minnesota (the United States)
- Coordinates: 45°53′16″N 95°4′59″W
- Country: United States
- State: Minnesota
- County: Todd

Area
  - Total: 34.9 sq mi (90.4 km^{2})
  - Land: 27.9 sq mi (72.2 km^{2})
  - Water: 7.1 sq mi (18.3 km^{2})
- Elevation: 1,339 ft (408 m)

Population (2020)
  - Total: 659
  - Density: 20/sq mi (7.6/km^{2})
- Time zone: UTC-6 (Central (CST))
  - Summer (DST): UTC-5 (CDT)
- ZIP code: 56360
- Area code: 320
- FIPS code: 27-24578
- GNIS feature ID: 0664299

Gordon Township is a township in Todd County, Minnesota, United States. The population was 545 at the 2000 census and 659 in the 2020 census.

Gordon Township was organized in 1869, and named for farmer J. M. Gordon, who was a member of the first board of Todd County Commissioners.

== Geography ==
According to the United States Census Bureau, the township has a total area of 34.9 square miles (90 km^{2}), of which 27.9 square miles (72 km^{2}) is land and 7.1 square miles (18 km^{2}) (20.19%) is water.

=== Lake Osakis ===
This large 6,389 acre lake is partly in Gordon Township and partly in neighboring Douglas County. It has two public boat landings; one on the west side and another on Battle Point Todd County Park on the East side of the Lake. Osakis Lake has a maximum depth of 73 feet. Lake Osakis if the headwaters for the Sauk River and is part of the Sauk River Watershed District.

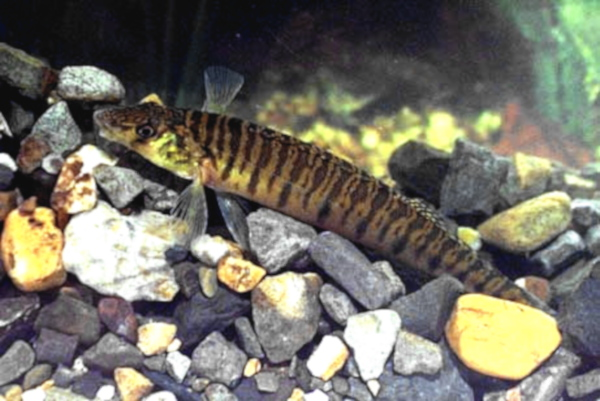
Logperch live in Lake Osakis.

The fish species on the Lake include black bullhead, black crappie, bluegill, brown bullhead, green sunfish, hybrid sunfish, largemouth bass, northern pike, pumpkinseed, rock bass, smallmouth bass, tullibee (cisco), walleye, yellow bullhead, yellow perch, bowfin (dogfish), common carp, shorthead redhorse, white sucker, banded killifish, blackchin shiner, blacknose shiner, bluntnose minnow, brook stickleback, central mudminnow, common shiner, emerald shiner, fathead minnow, golden shiner, Iowa darter, Johnny darter, least darter, logperch, mimic shiner, spottail shiner, and tadpole madtom.

=== Wildlife Management Area ===
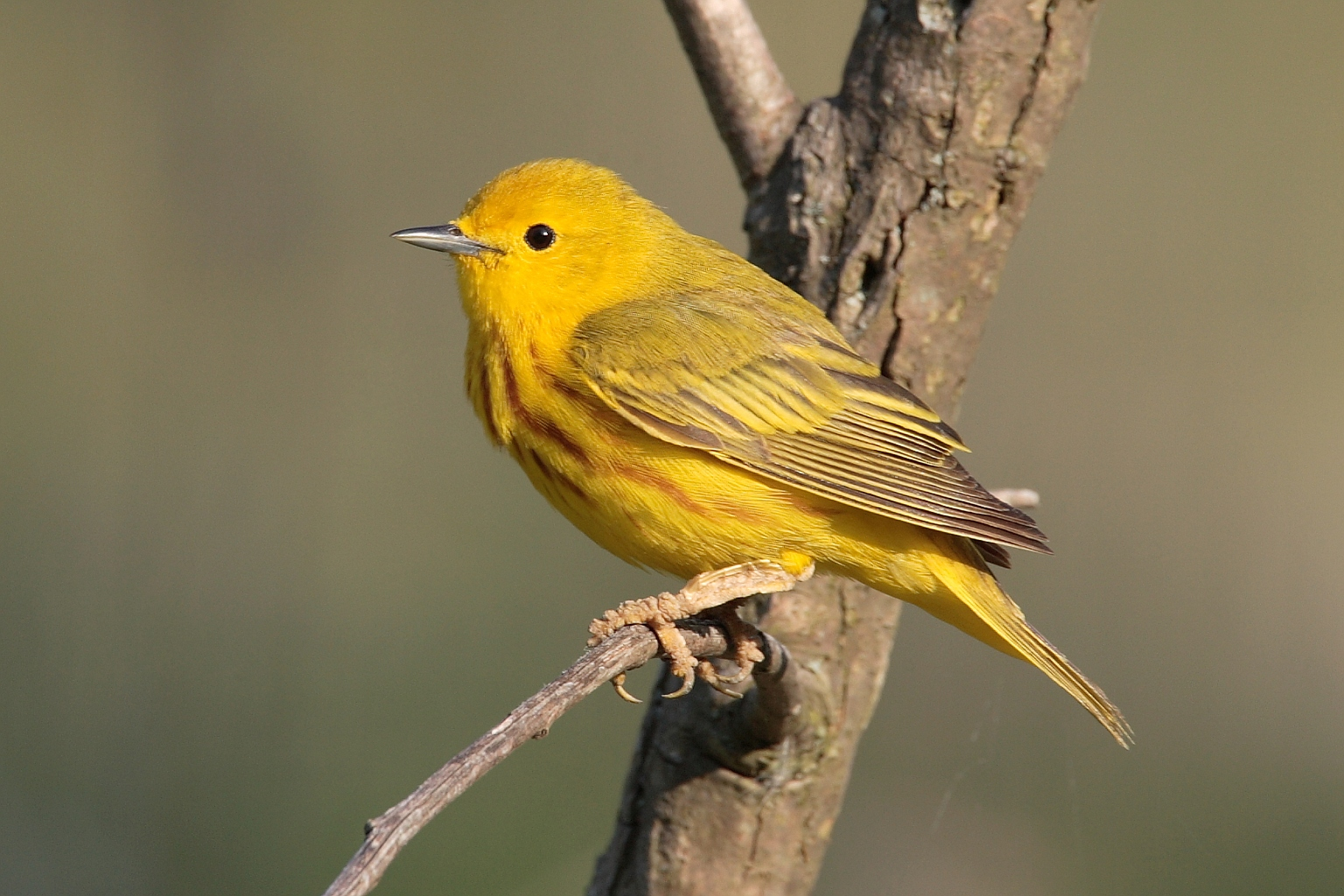
Yellow Warbler liver in Santer WMA.

The 572 acre Santer WildlifeManagement Area is located several miles east of Lake Osakis. The Area is made up of mixed habitat that includes grass fields and restored native grass fields, wetlands, restored wetlands, cattails, low land grass, brush, crop fields, and oak-aspen wooded areas. It is open to the public for a variety of outdoor activities including hunting, photography, and bird watching.

== Demographics ==
As of the census of 2000, there were 545 people, 214 households, and 154 families residing in the township. The population density was 19.6 inhabitants per square mile (7.6/km^{2}). There were 345 housing units at an average density of 12.4 units per square mile (4.8 units/km^{2}). The racial makeup of the township was 97.06% White, 0.18% Native American, 0.92% from other races, and 1.83% from two or more races. Hispanic or Latino of any race were 1.83% of the population.

There were 214 households, out of which 28.0% had children under the age of 18 living with them, 66.8% were married couples living together, 3.3% had a female householder with no husband present, and 28.0% were non-families. 23.8% of all households were made up of individuals, and 8.4% had someone living alone who was 65 years of age or older. The average household size was 2.55 and the average family size was 3.07.

In the township the population was spread out, with 25.5% under the age of 18, 4.6% from 18 to 24, 26.1% from 25 to 44, 25.1% from 45 to 64, and 18.7% who were 65 years of age or older. The median age was 40 years. For every 100 females, there were 108.0 males. For every 100 females age 18 and over, there were 107.1 males.

The median income for a household in the township was $39,531, and the median income for a family was $42,500. Males had a median income of $28,750 versus $18,125 for females. The per capita income for the township was $16,908. About 7.3% of families and 8.6% of the population were below the poverty line, including 10.0% of those under age 18 and 6.5% of those age 65 or over.
