= Reynolds Township, Todd County, Minnesota =

Reynolds Township, Minnesota
- Township
- Location within the state of Minnesota Reynolds Township, Minnesota (the United States)
- Coordinates: 45°59′4″N 94°56′43″W
- Country: United States
- State: Minnesota
- County: Todd

Area
  - Total: 36.1 sq mi (93.4 km^{2})
  - Land: 35.6 sq mi (92.3 km^{2})
  - Water: 0.42 sq mi (1.1 km^{2})
- Elevation: 1,375 ft (419 m)

Population (2020)
  - Total: 735
  - Density: 19/sq mi (7.5/km^{2})
- Time zone: UTC-6 (Central (CST))
  - Summer (DST): UTC-5 (CDT)
- FIPS code: 27-53926
- GNIS feature ID: 0665402

Reynolds Township is a township in Todd County, Minnesota, United States. The population was 688 at the 2000 census and 735 in the 2020 census.

== Geography ==
According to the United States Census Bureau, the township has a total area of 36.1 square miles (93.4 km^{2}), of which 35.6 square miles (92.3 km^{2}) is land and 0.4 square mile (1.1 km^{2}) (1.19%) is water.

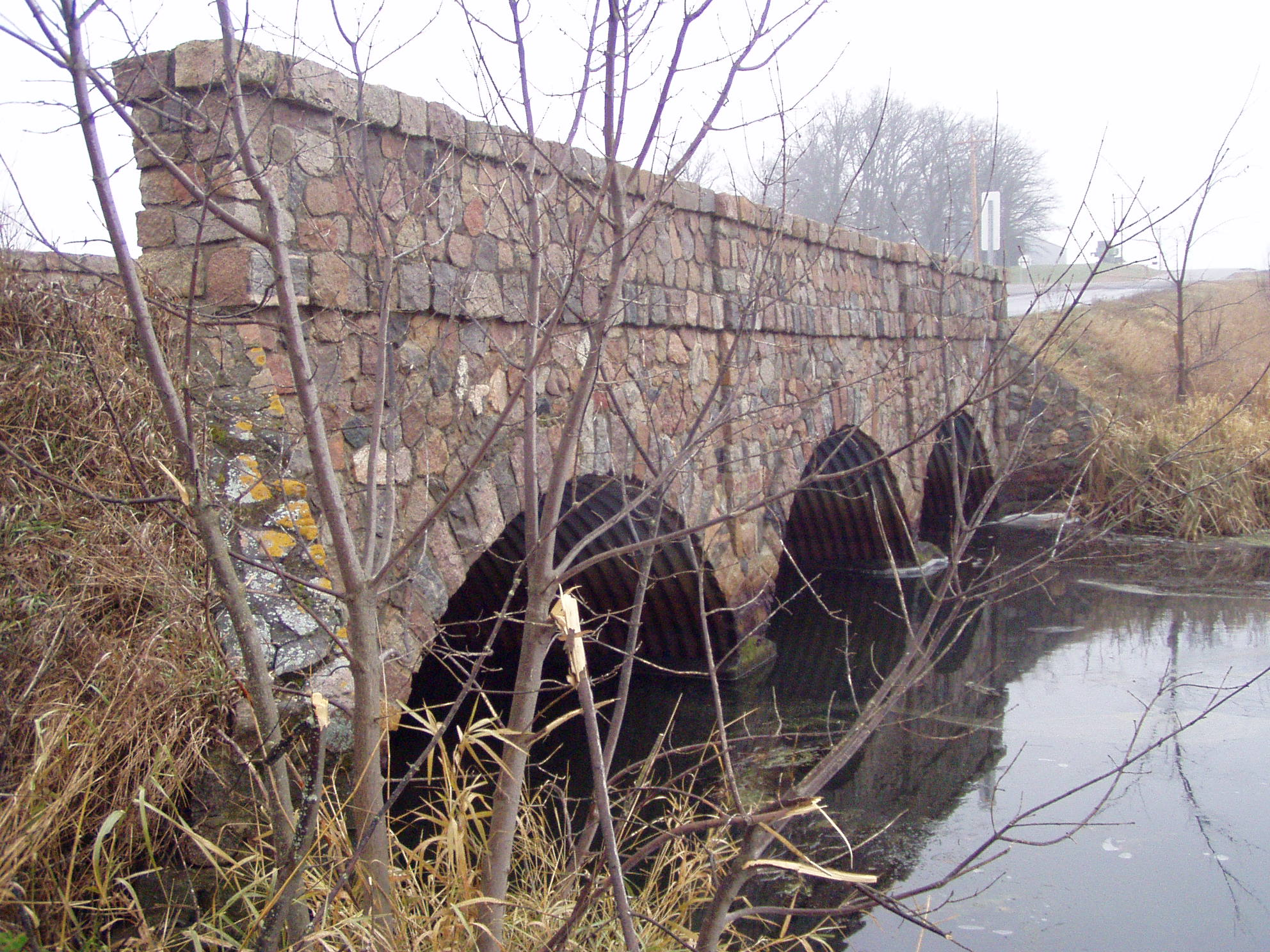
Stone bridge over Turtle Creek in Reynolds township.

== Demographics ==
As of the census of 2000, there were 688 people, 226 households, and 183 families residing in the township. The population density was 19.3 people per square mile (7.5/km^{2}). There were 245 housing units at an average density of 6.9/sq mi (2.7/km^{2}). The racial makeup of the township was 99.56% White, 0.15% African American, and 0.29% from two or more races. Hispanic or Latino of any race were 0.29% of the population.

There were 226 households, out of which 42.9% had children under the age of 18 living with them, 71.7% were married couples living together, 3.5% had a female householder with no husband present, and 19.0% were non-families. 15.9% of all households were made up of individuals, and 9.3% had someone living alone who was 65 years of age or older. The average household size was 3.04 and the average family size was 3.46.

In the township the population was spread out, with 34.4% under the age of 18, 7.7% from 18 to 24, 27.3% from 25 to 44, 20.3% from 45 to 64, and 10.2% who were 65 years of age or older. The median age was 33 years. For every 100 females, there were 108.5 males. For every 100 females age 18 and over, there were 122.2 males.

The median income for a household in the township was $33,393, and the median income for a family was $39,444. Males had a median income of $28,646 versus $21,563 for females. The per capita income for the township was $12,329. About 9.9% of families and 17.5% of the population were below the poverty line, including 22.5% of those under age 18 and 16.3% of those age 65 or over.
