= Long Prairie Township, Todd County, Minnesota =

Long Prairie Township, Minnesota
- Township
- Location within the state of Minnesota Long Prairie Township, Minnesota (the United States)
- Coordinates: 45°58′34″N 94°50′31″W
- Country: United States
- State: Minnesota
- County: Todd

Area
  - Total: 33.5 sq mi (86.8 km^{2})
  - Land: 33.1 sq mi (85.8 km^{2})
  - Water: 0.39 sq mi (1.0 km^{2})
- Elevation: 1,350 ft (410 m)

Population (2020)
  - Total: 884
  - Density: 25/sq mi (9.6/km^{2})
- Time zone: UTC-6 (Central (CST))
  - Summer (DST): UTC-5 (CDT)
- ZIP code: 56347
- Area code: 320
- FIPS code: 27-38078
- GNIS feature ID: 0664821

Long Prairie Township is a township in Todd County, Minnesota, United States. The population was 823 at the 2000 census and 884 in the 2020 census.

Long Prairie Township was organized in 1867, and named after the Long Prairie River.

== Geography ==
According to the United States Census Bureau, the township has a total area of 33.5 square miles (86.8 km^{2}), of which 33.1 square miles (85.8 km^{2}) is land and 0.4 square mile (1.0 km^{2}) (1.13%) is water.

== Demographics ==
As of the census of 2000, there were 823 people, 294 households, and 241 families residing in the township. The population density was 24.8 inhabitants per square mile (9.6/km^{2}). There were 310 housing units at an average density of 9.4 per square mile (3.6/km^{2}). The racial makeup of the township was 97.45% White, 0.12% African American, 0.12% Native American, 0.24% Asian, 1.22% from other races, and 0.85% from two or more races. Hispanic or Latino of any race were 1.58% of the population.

There were 294 households, out of which 34.4% had children under the age of 18 living with them, 75.5% were married couples living together, 3.1% had a female householder with no husband present, and 18.0% were non-families. 16.3% of all households were made up of individuals, and 5.1% had someone living alone who was 65 years of age or older. The average household size was 2.80 and the average family size was 3.12.

In the township the population was spread out, with 28.3% under the age of 18, 6.3% from 18 to 24, 24.7% from 25 to 44, 26.7% from 45 to 64, and 14.0% who were 65 years of age or older. The median age was 40 years. For every 100 females, there were 98.8 males. For every 100 females age 18 and over, there were 104.2 males.

The median income for a household in the township was $44,792, and the median income for a family was $53,077. Males had a median income of $30,948 versus $24,375 for females. The per capita income for the township was $17,903. About 4.1% of families and 4.6% of the population were below the poverty line, including 4.9% of those under age 18 and 9.5% of those age 65 or over.
