= Birchdale Township, Todd County, Minnesota =

Birchdale Township, Minnesota
- Township
- Location within the state of Minnesota Birchdale Township, Minnesota (the United States)
- Coordinates: 45°47′54″N 94°49′46″W
- Country: United States
- State: Minnesota
- County: Todd

Area
  - Total: 35.9 sq mi (93.1 km^{2})
  - Land: 32.9 sq mi (85.1 km^{2})
  - Water: 3.1 sq mi (8.0 km^{2})
- Elevation: 1,250 ft (380 m)

Population (2020)
  - Total: 931
  - Density: 25/sq mi (9.6/km^{2})
- Time zone: UTC-6 (Central (CST))
  - Summer (DST): UTC-5 (CDT)
- FIPS code: 27-06022
- GNIS feature ID: 0663596
- Website: https://birchdaletownship.com/

Birchdale Township is a township in Todd County, Minnesota, United States. The population was 814 at the 2000 census and grew to 931 for the 2020 census.

Birchdale Township was organized in 1869. The unincorporated village of Ward Springs is in Section 23 of the township. It was named after the family that platted it, W. and Martha J. Ward, but was originally Birch Lake City and it had a post office simply called Birch Lake, due to its proximity to a lake of the same name. At one time it had a Northern Pacific Railroad station.

Ward Springs is widely known for its spontaneous and unorganized July 4 Independence Day parade.

== Geography ==
According to the United States Census Bureau, the township has a total area of 36.0 square miles (93 km^{2}), of which 32.9 square miles (85 km^{2}) is land and 3.1 square miles (8.0 km^{2}) (8.57%) is water.

=== Wildlife Management Area ===
The Elgin Wood Wildlife Management Area has a large unnamed pond on the east side of its 239 acres. There is access to a mile long hiking trail on the north end end, just off Blue Spruce Road in Birchdale Township. The Minnesota DNR describes this area as being tolling hardwood forest with some small wetlands.

== Demographics ==
As of the census of 2000, there were 814 people, 318 households, and 221 families residing in the township. The population density was 24.8 inhabitants per square mile (9.6/km^{2}). There were 568 housing units at an average density of 17.3 per square mile (6.7/km^{2}). The racial makeup of the township was 99.26% White, 0.12% Asian, and 0.61% from two or more races. Hispanic or Latino of any race were 0.12% of the population.

There were 318 households, out of which 33.3% had children under the age of 18 living with them, 61.9% were married couples living together, 2.5% had a female householder with no husband present, and 30.5% were non-families. 27.0% of all households were made up of individuals, and 10.7% had someone living alone who was 65 years of age or older. The average household size was 2.56 and the average family size was 3.14.

In the township the population was spread out, with 28.3% under the age of 18, 5.3% from 18 to 24, 26.8% from 25 to 44, 25.2% from 45 to 64, and 14.5% who were 65 years of age or older. The median age was 40 years. For every 100 females, there were 108.2 males. For every 100 females age 18 and over, there were 113.1 males.

The median income for a household in the township was $33,750, and the median income for a family was $47,667. Males had a median income of $30,139 versus $24,688 for females. The per capita income for the township was $22,056. About 5.2% of families and 10.9% of the population were below the poverty line, including 13.7% of those under age 18 and 11.7% of those age 65 or over.
