= Burtrum, Minnesota =

City in Minnesota, United States

Burtrum
- City
- Motto: A Place to Belong
- Location of Burtrum, Minnesota
- Coordinates: 45°51′57″N 94°41′15″W
- Country: United States
- State: Minnesota
- County: Todd

Government
  - Mayor: Jenae Ulbricht

Area
  - Total: 0.57 sq mi (1.47 km^{2})
  - Land: 0.57 sq mi (1.47 km^{2})
  - Water: 0 sq mi (0.00 km^{2})
- Elevation: 1,283 ft (391 m)

Population (2020)
  - Total: 123
  - Density: 216.9/sq mi (83.76/km^{2})
- Time zone: UTC-6 (Central (CST))
  - Summer (DST): UTC-5 (CDT)
- ZIP code: 56318
- Area code: 320
- FIPS code: 27-08902
- GNIS feature ID: 2393476
- Website: www.cityofburtrum.com

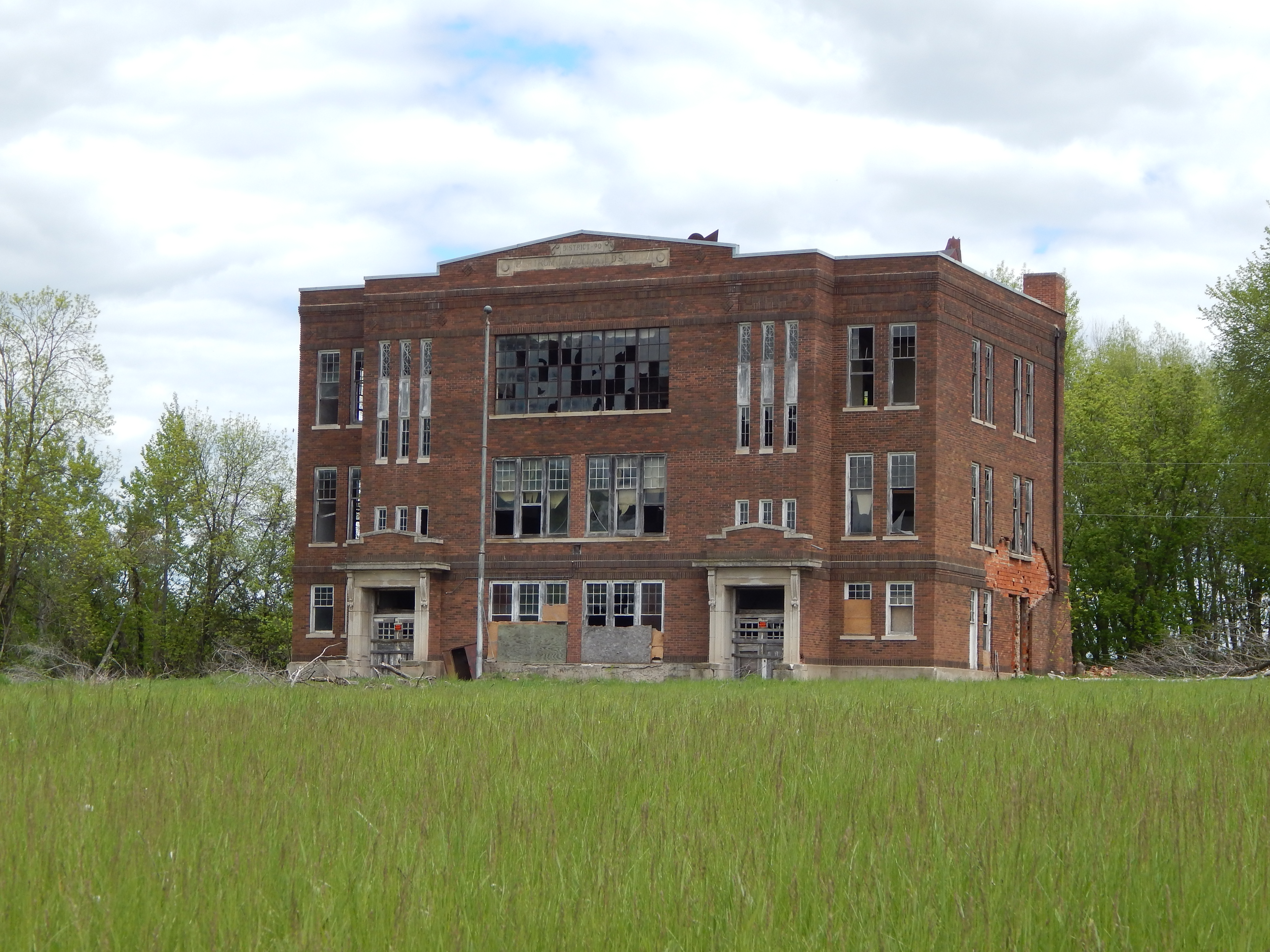
This school was built in the 1890s and was closed in the early 1980s

Burtrum is a city in Todd County, Minnesota, United States. The population was 144 at the 2010 United States census and 123 at the 2020 United States Census.

The city is home to the Grey Eagle Burtrum Lions Park and a Grand Army of the Republic cemetery named after Civil War veteran Moses Dane.

== History ==
Burtrum was platted in 1884, under the name of Hansen, and developed when the Northern Pacific Railroad came through. A post office has been in operation at Burtrum since 1888. Burtrum was incorporated in 1894, according to the third edition of Upham's Minnesota Place Names.

== Geography ==
According to the United States Census Bureau, the city has an area of 0.57 square miles (1.48 km^{2}), all land.

Minnesota State Highway 28 serves as a main route in the community.

== Demographics ==
Historical population
| Census | Pop. | Note | %± |
|---|---|---|---|
| 1910 | 217 | | — |
| 1920 | 212 | | −2.3% |
| 1930 | 175 | | −17.5% |
| 1940 | 297 | | 69.7% |
| 1950 | 194 | | −34.7% |
| 1960 | 160 | | −17.5% |
| 1970 | 135 | | −15.6% |
| 1980 | 177 | | 31.1% |
| 1990 | 172 | | −2.8% |
| 2000 | 146 | | −15.1% |
| 2010 | 144 | | −1.4% |
| 2020 | 123 | | −14.6% |
U.S. Decennial Census

=== 2010 census ===
As of the census of 2010, there were 144 people, 63 households, and 38 families living in the city. The population density was 252.6 inhabitants per square mile (97.5/km^{2}). There were 73 housing units at an average density of 128.1 per square mile (49.5/km^{2}). The racial makeup of the city was 98.6% White and 1.4% from two or more races. Hispanic or Latino of any race were 1.4% of the population.

There were 63 households, of which 31.7% had children under the age of 18 living with them, 38.1% were married couples living together, 15.9% had a female householder with no husband present, 6.3% had a male householder with no wife present, and 39.7% were non-families. 34.9% of all households were made up of individuals, and 12.7% had someone living alone who was 65 years of age or older. The average household size was 2.29 and the average family size was 2.89.

The median age in the city was 39.3 years. 27.8% of residents were under the age of 18; 6.3% were between the ages of 18 and 24; 23.1% were from 25 to 44; 23.7% were from 45 to 64; and 19.4% were 65 years of age or older. The gender makeup of the city was 49.3% male and 50.7% female.

=== 2000 census ===
As of the census of 2000, there were 146 people, 69 households, and 38 families living in the city. The population density was 258.2 inhabitants per square mile (99.7/km^{2}). There were 82 housing units at an average density of 145.0 per square mile (56.0/km^{2}). The racial makeup of the city was 99.32% White, and 0.68% from two or more races.

There were 69 households, out of which 26.1% had children under the age of 18 living with them, 46.4% were married couples living together, 7.2% had a female householder with no husband present, and 43.5% were non-families. 36.2% of all households were made up of individuals, and 8.7% had someone living alone who was 65 years of age or older. The average household size was 2.12 and the average family size was 2.77.

In the city, the population was spread out, with 21.2% under the age of 18, 14.4% from 18 to 24, 24.0% from 25 to 44, 26.0% from 45 to 64, and 14.4% who were 65 years of age or older. The median age was 40 years. For every 100 females, there were 105.6 males. For every 100 females age 18 and over, there were 113.0 males.

The median income for a household in the city was $26,875, and the median income for a family was $38,125. Males had a median income of $25,833 versus $20,000 for females. The per capita income for the city was $13,788. There were 4.9% of families and 12.4% of the population living below the poverty line, including 11.4% of under eighteens and 8.7% of those over 64.
