= Fawn Lake Township, Todd County, Minnesota =

Fawn Lake Township, Minnesota
- Township
- Location within the state of Minnesota Fawn Lake Township, Minnesota (the United States)
- Coordinates: 46°13′45″N 94°43′53″W
- Country: United States
- State: Minnesota
- County: Todd

Area
  - Total: 35.7 sq mi (92.5 km^{2})
  - Land: 34.0 sq mi (88.1 km^{2})
  - Water: 1.7 sq mi (4.4 km^{2})
- Elevation: 1,299 ft (396 m)

Population (2020)
  - Total: 538
  - Density: 13/sq mi (5/km^{2})
- Time zone: UTC-6 (Central (CST))
  - Summer (DST): UTC-5 (CDT)
- FIPS code: 27-20708
- GNIS feature ID: 0664150

Fawn Lake Township is a township in Todd County, Minnesota, United States. The population was 440 at the 2000 census. At the time of the 2020 census the population had increased to 538.

Fawn Lake Township was organized in 1881.The township is named after a lake in the east part of section 30.

== Geography ==
According to the United States Census Bureau, the township has a total area of 35.7 square miles (92 km^{2}), of which 34.0 square miles (88 km^{2}) is land and 1.7 square miles (4.4 km^{2}) (4.79%) is water.

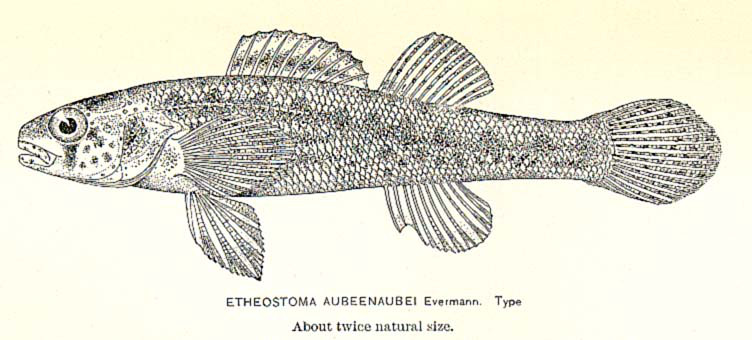
The 2 - 3 inch long Iowa darter lives in Fawn Lake

Fawn Lake township has numerous lakes, including the township's name sake. Fawn Lake is 125 acres in size and has a maximum depth of 21 feet. According to the Minnesota DNR fish species living in the lake include the black bullhead, black crappie, bluegill, brown bullhead, hybrid sunfish, largemouth bass, northern pike, pumpkinseed, rock bass, walleye, yellow bullhead, yellow perch, white sucker, central mudminnow, and the Iowa darter.

== Demographics ==
As of the census of 2000, there were 440 people, 174 households, and 128 families residing in the township. The population density was 12.9 inhabitants per square mile (5.0/km^{2}). There were 225 housing units at an average density of 6.6 per square mile (2.5/km^{2}). The racial makeup of the township was 96.59% White, 0.23% African American, 0.23% Asian, 0.23% Pacific Islander, 1.14% from other races, and 1.59% from two or more races. Hispanic or Latino of any race were 2.05% of the population.

There were 174 households, out of which 28.7% had children under the age of 18 living with them, 59.8% were married couples living together, 8.0% had a female householder with no husband present, and 26.4% were non-families. 22.4% of all households were made up of individuals, and 5.7% had someone living alone who was 65 years of age or older. The average household size was 2.53 and the average family size was 2.93.

In the township the population was spread out, with 25.0% under the age of 18, 7.0% from 18 to 24, 27.7% from 25 to 44, 25.0% from 45 to 64, and 15.2% who were 65 years of age or older. The median age was 39 years. For every 100 females, there were 104.7 males. For every 100 females age 18 and over, there were 108.9 males.

The median income for a household in the township was $33,646, and the median income for a family was $45,469. Males had a median income of $30,000 versus $16,875 for females. The per capita income for the township was $15,559. About 5.9% of families and 10.9% of the population were below the poverty line, including 12.7% of those under age 18 and 10.3% of those age 65 or over.
