= Turtle Creek Township, Todd County, Minnesota =

Turtle Creek Township, Minnesota
- Township
- Location within the state of Minnesota Turtle Creek Township, Minnesota (the United States)
- Coordinates: 46°9′38″N 94°43′20″W
- Country: United States
- State: Minnesota
- County: Todd

Area
  - Total: 35.7 sq mi (92.5 km^{2})
  - Land: 32.7 sq mi (84.7 km^{2})
  - Water: 3.0 sq mi (7.8 km^{2})
- Elevation: 1,283 ft (391 m)

Population (2020)
  - Total: 270
  - Density: 9.8/sq mi (3.8/km^{2})
- Time zone: UTC-6 (Central (CST))
  - Summer (DST): UTC-5 (CDT)
- FIPS code: 27-65740
- GNIS feature ID: 0665818

Turtle Creek Township is a township in Todd County, Minnesota, United States. The population was 323 at the 2000 census and was 270 at the time of the 2020 census.

Turtle Creek Township was organized in 1890. Turtle Lake is in the northwest corner of the township and Turtle Creek, a tributary to the Long Prairie River, flows along its western border.

== Geography ==
According to the United States Census Bureau, the township has a total area of 35.7 square miles (92.5 km^{2}); 32.7 square miles (84.7 km^{2}) is land and 3.0 square miles (7.8 km^{2}) (8.48%) is water.

=== Lakes ===
The township includes numerous lakes such as the 562 acre Rice Lake which has a maximum depth of 8 feet. The fish species in Rice Lake include black bullhead, black crappie, bluegill, brown bullhead, hybrid sunfish, largemouth bass, northern pike, pumpkinseed, yellow bullhead, yellow perch, common carp, and white sucker.

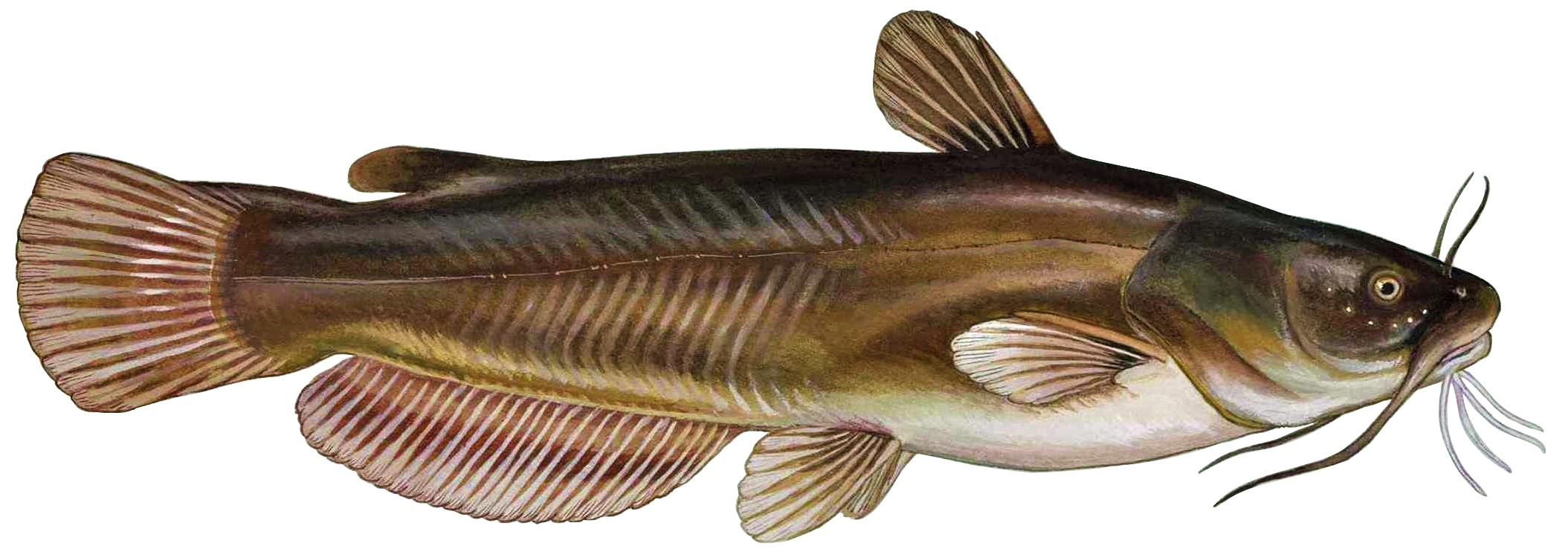
Yellow bullhead are found in Big Lake and Rice Lake in Turtle Creek Township

Big Lake, at 319.8 acres, is smaller than Rice Lake. With a maximum depth of 21 feet its fish species are more diverse and include black bullhead, black crappie, bluegill, brown bullhead, green sunfish, hybrid sunfish, largemouth bass, northern pike, pumpkinseed, sunfish, walleye, yellow bullhead, yellow perch, bowfin (dogfish), white sucker, blacknose shiner, bluntnose minnow, central mudminnow, golden shiner, Iowa darter, Johnny darter, spottail shiner, the tadpole madtom.

=== Wildlife Management Area ===
Turtle Creek Wildlife Management Area is located partially section 31 of the township. This 319.8 acre WMA contains the Mud Lake wetland with cattails, low land grass and brush. Management of this unit focuses on maintaining and improving the wetland and habitat for a diversity of native plants and wildlife.

== Demographics ==
As of the census of 2000, there were 323 people, 127 households, and 98 families residing in the township. The population density was 9.9 people per square mile (3.8/km^{2}). There were 255 housing units at an average density of 7.8/sq mi (3.0/km^{2}). The racial makeup of the township was 96.28% White, 0.62% Native American, 0.31% Asian, and 2.79% from two or more races.

There were 127 households, out of which 30.7% had children under the age of 18 living with them, 72.4% were married couples living together, 1.6% had a female householder with no husband present, and 22.8% were non-families. 19.7% of all households were made up of individuals, and 9.4% had someone living alone who was 65 years of age or older. The average household size was 2.54 and the average family size was 2.94.

In the township the population was spread out, with 25.1% under the age of 18, 6.2% from 18 to 24, 23.2% from 25 to 44, 25.4% from 45 to 64, and 20.1% who were 65 years of age or older. The median age was 43 years. For every 100 females, there were 116.8 males. For every 100 females age 18 and over, there were 112.3 males.

The median income for a household in the township was $31,750, and the median income for a family was $36,458. Males had a median income of $30,313 versus $21,094 for females. The per capita income for the township was $16,896. About 13.4% of families and 16.0% of the population were below the poverty line, including 20.5% of those under age 18 and 25.0% of those age 65 or over.
