= Villard Township, Todd County, Minnesota =

Villard Township, Minnesota
- Township
- Location within the state of Minnesota Villard Township, Minnesota (the United States)
- Coordinates: 46°19′7″N 94°43′29″W
- Country: United States
- State: Minnesota
- County: Todd

Area
  - Total: 31.7 sq mi (82.1 km^{2})
  - Land: 30.1 sq mi (78.0 km^{2})
  - Water: 1.6 sq mi (4.1 km^{2})
- Elevation: 1,250 ft (380 m)

Population (2020)
  - Total: 667
  - Density: 20/sq mi (7.6/km^{2})
- Time zone: UTC-6 (Central (CST))
  - Summer (DST): UTC-5 (CDT)
- FIPS code: 27-67162
- GNIS feature ID: 0665875

Villard Township is a township in Todd County, Minnesota, United States. The population was 592 at the 2000 census and was 667 at the time of the 2020 census.

Villard Township was organized in 1882, and named for Henry Villard, a railroad official.

== Geography ==
According to the United States Census Bureau, the township has a total area of 31.7 square miles (82.1 km^{2}); 30.1 square miles (78.0 km^{2}) is land and 1.6 square miles (4.1 km^{2}) (4.99%) is water. Villard township has several lakes including Hayden and Lawrence Lake which has the 161 acre Lawrence Lake Wildlife Management Area which is primarily located on its South side. The Wildlife Management Area is a mixture of oak, aspen, and pine forests. Management of this unit by the Minnesota DNR focuses on maintaining and improving the habitat for a diversity of native plants and wildlife.

The Crow Wing River defines the Northeastern boundary of the township. Cass County is to the North of the River.

=== Villages ===
Philbrook is an unincorporated village on the southern edge of the township. In the past it had both a post office and a Northern Pacific Railroad station located in the village. Philbrook was also known as Riverside since its on the banks of the Long Prairie River. Hayden, in Section 9 of the township, also had a Northern Pacific station.

== Demographics ==
As of the census of 2000, there were 592 people, 210 households, and 161 families residing in the township. The population density was 19.7 people per square mile (7.6/km^{2}). There were 243 housing units at an average density of 8.1/sq mi (3.1/km^{2}). The racial makeup of the township was 97.97% White, 0.17% African American, 0.17% Native American, 0.68% Asian, and 1.01% from two or more races. Hispanic or Latino of any race were 0.17% of the population.

There were 210 households, out of which 36.2% had children under the age of 18 living with them, 68.6% were married couples living together, 5.2% had a female householder with no husband present, and 23.3% were non-families. 18.1% of all households were made up of individuals, and 7.1% had someone living alone who was 65 years of age or older. The average household size was 2.80 and the average family size was 3.23.

In the township the population was spread out, with 28.9% under the age of 18, 7.4% from 18 to 24, 23.5% from 25 to 44, 30.7% from 45 to 64, and 9.5% who were 65 years of age or older. The median age was 38 years. For every 100 females, there were 103.4 males. For every 100 females age 18 and over, there were 104.4 males.

The median income for a household in the township was $40,556, and the median income for a family was $47,500. Males had a median income of $28,523 versus $22,031 for females. The per capita income for the township was $16,025. About 4.5% of families and 7.9% of the population were below the poverty line, including 3.1% of those under age 18 and 11.9% of those age 65 or over.
