= Burleene Township, Todd County, Minnesota =

Burleene Township, Minnesota
- Township
- Location within the state of Minnesota Burleene Township, Minnesota (the United States)
- Coordinates: 46°4′6″N 95°5′20″W
- Country: United States
- State: Minnesota
- County: Todd

Area
  - Total: 35.9 sq mi (92.9 km^{2})
  - Land: 35.8 sq mi (92.8 km^{2})
  - Water: 0.039 sq mi (0.1 km^{2})
- Elevation: 1,398 ft (426 m)

Population (2020)
  - Total: 382
  - Density: 10/sq mi (3.9/km^{2})
- Time zone: UTC-6 (Central (CST))
  - Summer (DST): UTC-5 (CDT)
- FIPS code: 27-08668
- GNIS feature ID: 0663705

Burleene Township is a township in Todd County, Minnesota, United States. The population was 365 at the 2000 census and 382 in the 2020 census.

Burleene Township was organized in 1888. The spelling of the township's name is a phonetic spelling of Berlin, a named suggested by German settlers, with a heavy accent, at the township's organizational meeting.

== Geography ==
According to the United States Census Bureau, the township has a total area of 35.9 square miles (93 km^{2}), of which 35.8 square miles (93 km^{2}) is land and 0.1 square miles (0.26 km^{2}) (0.14%) is water.

The small unincorporated village of Clotho lies in the southeast corner of Burleene Township, with part of the village also being in neighboring Leslie Township which borders Burleene Township on the south. The Long Prairie River flows near the village coming from the south and then moves in an easterly direction about one mile east of Clotho.

Burleene Township is entirely in the Long Prairie River watershed. The landscape in Burleene consists of small woodlands, wetlands, and farmlands. Abundant wildlife, such as white-tailed-deer, wild turkey, and bald eagle flourishes in this township.

=== Wildlife Management Area ===
The 556 acre WMA is in Burleene Township. It is mostly lowland brushy areas and aspen- oak woods. Dismal Creek, a Long Prairie River tributary, has its head waters here. There is a parking lot and trail on the south side of the WMA. There are two small open water ponds near the lot.

== Demographics ==
As of the census of 2000, there were 365 people, 134 households, and 101 families residing in the township. The population density was 10.2 inhabitants per square mile (3.9/km^{2}). There were 153 housing units at an average density of 4.3 per square mile (1.7/km^{2}). The racial makeup of the township was 100.00% White.

There were 134 households, out of which 32.8% had children under the age of 18 living with them, 68.7% were married couples living together, 3.7% had a female householder with no husband present, and 23.9% were non-families. 21.6% of all households were made up of individuals, and 9.7% had someone living alone who was 65 years of age or older. The average household size was 2.72 and the average family size was 3.21.

In the township the population was spread out, with 27.4% under the age of 18, 7.1% from 18 to 24, 25.5% from 25 to 44, 27.4% from 45 to 64, and 12.6% who were 65 years of age or older. The median age was 39 years. For every 100 females, there were 107.4 males. For every 100 females age 18 and over, there were 108.7 males.

The median income for a household in the township was $32,143, and the median income for a family was $35,625. Males had a median income of $26,563 versus $20,179 for females. The per capita income for the township was $21,204. About 6.3% of families and 8.5% of the population were below the poverty line, including 2.1% of those under age 18 and 20.8% of those age 65 or over.
