= Burnhamville Township, Todd County, Minnesota =

Burnhamville Township, Minnesota
- Township
- Location within the state of Minnesota Burnhamville Township, Minnesota (the United States)
- Coordinates: 45°53′39″N 94°41′54″W
- Country: United States
- State: Minnesota
- County: Todd

Area
  - Total: 35.1 sq mi (90.8 km^{2})
  - Land: 31.6 sq mi (81.9 km^{2})
  - Water: 3.4 sq mi (8.9 km^{2})
- Elevation: 1,325 ft (404 m)

Population (2020)
  - Total: 773
  - Density: 24/sq mi (9.2/km^{2})
- Time zone: UTC-6 (Central (CST))
  - Summer (DST): UTC-5 (CDT)
- FIPS code: 27-08722
- GNIS feature ID: 0663707

Burnhamville Township is a township in Todd County, Minnesota, United States. The population was 751 at the 2000 census. By the 2020 census the population had risen to 773.

== History ==
Burnhamville Township was organized in 1870, and named for David Burnham, an early settler who had been a blacksmith at the Winnebago Indian Agency in Long Prairie prior to homesteading in the township just after the Civil War.

== Geography ==
According to the United States Census Bureau, the township has a total area of 35.0 square miles (91 km^{2}), of which 31.6 square miles (82 km^{2}) is land and 3.4 square miles (8.8 km^{2}) (9.76%) is water.

== Demographics ==
As of the census of 2000, there were 751 people, 282 households, and 210 families residing in the township. The population density was 23.7 inhabitants per square mile (9.2/km^{2}). There were 559 housing units at an average density of 17.7 per square mile (6.8/km^{2}). The racial makeup of the township was 99.07% White, 0.27% Native American, 0.13% Pacific Islander, 0.13% from other races, and 0.40% from two or more races. Hispanic or Latino of any race were 0.67% of the population.

There were 282 households, out of which 31.2% had children under the age of 18 living with them, 68.4% were married couples living together, 2.8% had a female householder with no husband present, and 25.2% were non-families. 20.6% of all households were made up of individuals, and 6.4% had someone living alone who was 65 years of age or older. The average household size was 2.66 and the average family size was 3.09.

In the township the population was spread out, with 24.6% under the age of 18, 10.0% from 18 to 24, 24.1% from 25 to 44, 30.5% from 45 to 64, and 10.8% who were 65 years of age or older. The median age was 40 years. For every 100 females, there were 115.8 males. For every 100 females age 18 and over, there were 114.4 males.

The median income for a household in the township was $41,375, and the median income for a family was $48,438. Males had a median income of $26,563 versus $20,313 for females. The per capita income for the township was $17,978. About 6.5% of families and 8.1% of the population were below the poverty line, including 7.3% of those under age 18 and 14.5% of those age 65 or over.
