= Todd County, Minnesota =

County in Minnesota, United States

- County
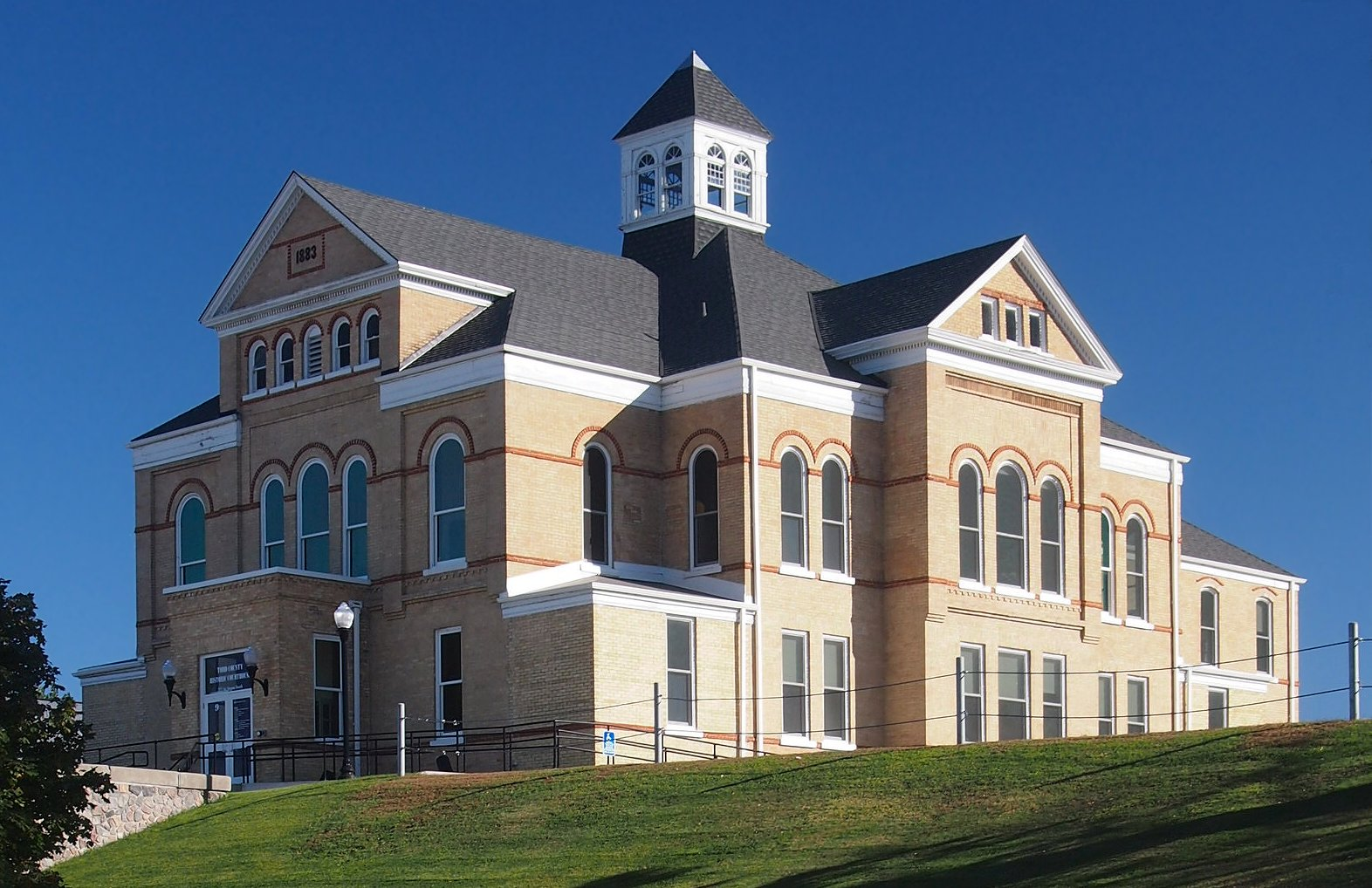
- The Todd County Courthouse in Long Prairie

- Location within the U.S. state of Minnesota
- Coordinates: 46°04′N 94°54′W
- Country: United States
- State: Minnesota
- Created: 1855
- Organized: January 1, 1867
- Named for: John Blair Smith Todd
- Seat: Long Prairie
- Largest city: Long Prairie

Area
  - Total: 980 sq mi (2,500 km^{2})
  - Land: 945 sq mi (2,450 km^{2})
  - Water: 35 sq mi (91 km^{2}) 3.5%

Population (2020)
  - Total: 25,262
  - Estimate (2025): 26,060 ▲
  - Density: 27.6/sq mi (10.7/km^{2})
- Time zone: UTC−6 (Central)
  - Summer (DST): UTC−5 (CDT)
- Congressional district: 7th
- Website: www.toddcountymn.gov

Todd County is a county in the central part of the U.S. state of Minnesota. As of the 2020 census, the population was 25,262. Its county seat is Long Prairie.

== History ==
The county was created by the Minnesota Territorial legislature on February 20, 1855, although the county government was not organized until January 1, 1867, with Long Prairie as the county seat. It was named for John Blair Smith Todd, who was a delegate from Dakota Territory to the United States House of Representatives, and general in the Union Army during the American Civil War.

In 1976 the Todd County Bicentennial Commission compiled an extensive history of the County in a 316 page spiral bound book. The book includes histories of Todd County Villages, townships, and forgotten post offices, among other items.

== Geography ==
The Crow Wing River flows southeastward along the northeastern border of Todd County. The Long Prairie River flows east-northeast through the central part of the county, discharging into the Crow Wing on the county's northeastern border. The Wing River, northwest of the Long Prairie River, also flows into the Crow Wing. The county terrain consists of rolling hills, dotted with lakes and etched with drainages. The area is devoted to agriculture. The terrain slopes to the east and south, with its highest point on the west border at 1,483 ft (452 m) ASL. The county has a total area of 980 mi^{2} (2,500 km^{2}), of which 945 mi^{2} (2,450 km^{2}) is land and 35 mi^{2} (91 km^{2})(3.5%) is water.

Soils of Todd County

=== Major highways ===
- Interstate 94
- U.S. Highway 10
- U.S. Highway 52
- U.S. Highway 71
- Minnesota State Highway 27
- Minnesota State Highway 28
- Minnesota State Highway 210
- Minnesota State Highway 287

=== Adjacent counties ===
- Wadena County (north)
- Cass County (northeast)
- Morrison County (east)
- Stearns County (south)
- Douglas County (west)
- Otter Tail County (northwest)

=== Lakes ===
- Bass Lake
- Beauty Lake
- Big Birch Lake (part)
- Big Lake
- Big Swan Lake
- Buckhorn Lake
- Bunker Lake
- Cedar Lake
- Charlotte Lake
- Coal Lake
- Fairly Lake
- Fawn Lake
- Felix Lake
- Goose Lake
- Guernsey Lake
- Hayden Lake
- Horseshoe Lake
- Juergens Lake
- Keller Lake
- Lady Lake
- Lake Osakis (part)
- Latimer Lake
- Lawrence Lake
- Little Birch Lake (part)
- Little Sauk Lake
- Long Lake (Birchdale Twp.)
- Long Lake (Burnhamville Twp.)
- Maple Lake
- Mary Lake (part)
- McCarrahan Lake
- Mill Lake
- Mound Lake
- Mud Lake
- Pauley Lake
- Pendergast Lake
- Pine Island Lake
- Rice Lake
- Sauk Lake (part)
- Schreiers Lake
- Sheet Lake
- Trace Lake
- Twin Lakes (part)
- West Union Lake

=== Protected areas ===
- Aurzada Wildlife Management Area
- Buckhorn Lake State Wildlife Management Area
- Burleene State Wildlife Management Area
- Dower State Wildlife Management Area
- Elgin Woods Wildlife Management Area
- Iona Wildlife Management Area
- Ireland State Wildlife Management Area
- Long Prairie River Wildlife Management Area
- Oak Ridge State Wildlife Management Area
- Osakis Wildlife Management Area (part)
- Owen-Hinz Wildlife Management Area
- Quistorff Wildlife Management Area
- Randall State Wildlife Management Area
- Santer Wildlife Management Area
- Sheet Lake Wildlife Management Area
- West Union Wildlife Management Area

== Demographics ==
Historical population
| Census | Pop. | Note | %± |
|---|---|---|---|
| 1860 | 430 | | — |
| 1870 | 2,036 | | 373.5% |
| 1880 | 6,133 | | 201.2% |
| 1890 | 12,930 | | 110.8% |
| 1900 | 22,214 | | 71.8% |
| 1910 | 23,407 | | 5.4% |
| 1920 | 26,059 | | 11.3% |
| 1930 | 26,170 | | 0.4% |
| 1940 | 27,438 | | 4.8% |
| 1950 | 25,420 | | −7.4% |
| 1960 | 23,119 | | −9.1% |
| 1970 | 22,114 | | −4.3% |
| 1980 | 24,991 | | 13.0% |
| 1990 | 23,363 | | −6.5% |
| 2000 | 24,426 | | 4.5% |
| 2010 | 24,895 | | 1.9% |
| 2020 | 25,262 | | 1.5% |
| 2025 (est.) | 26,060 | ▲ | 3.2% |

=== 2020 census ===
As of the 2020 census, the county had a population of 25,262. The median age was 41.5 years. 25.3% of residents were under the age of 18 and 20.5% of residents were 65 years of age or older. For every 100 females there were 105.5 males, and for every 100 females age 18 and over there were 104.6 males age 18 and over.

The racial makeup of the county was 88.7% White, 0.5% Black or African American, 0.4% American Indian and Alaska Native, 0.4% Asian, 0.3% Native Hawaiian and Pacific Islander, 5.2% from some other race, and 4.6% from two or more races. Hispanic or Latino residents of any race comprised 8.7% of the population.

0.6% of residents lived in urban areas, while 99.4% lived in rural areas.

There were 9,898 households in the county, of which 28.2% had children under the age of 18 living in them. Of all households, 53.8% were married-couple households, 19.9% were households with a male householder and no spouse or partner present, and 19.0% were households with a female householder and no spouse or partner present. About 27.5% of all households were made up of individuals and 13.2% had someone living alone who was 65 years of age or older.

There were 12,770 housing units, of which 22.5% were vacant. Among occupied housing units, 80.5% were owner-occupied and 19.5% were renter-occupied. The homeowner vacancy rate was 1.3% and the rental vacancy rate was 7.6%.

=== Racial and ethnic composition ===
Todd County, Minnesota – Racial and ethnic composition Note: the US Census treats Hispanic/Latino as an ethnic category. This table excludes Latinos from the racial categories and assigns them to a separate category. Hispanics/Latinos may be of any race.
| Race / Ethnicity (NH = Non-Hispanic) | Pop 1980 | Pop 1990 | Pop 2000 | Pop 2010 | Pop 2020 | % 1980 | % 1990 | % 2000 | % 2010 | % 2020 |
|---|---|---|---|---|---|---|---|---|---|---|
| White alone (NH) | 24,802 | 23,189 | 23,603 | 23,052 | 22,117 | 99.24% | 99.26% | 96.63% | 92.60% | 87.55% |
| Black or African American alone (NH) | 7 | 8 | 27 | 73 | 95 | 0.03% | 0.03% | 0.11% | 0.29% | 0.38% |
| Native American or Alaska Native alone (NH) | 36 | 51 | 65 | 71 | 76 | 0.14% | 0.22% | 0.27% | 0.29% | 0.30% |
| Asian alone (NH) | 58 | 51 | 76 | 102 | 97 | 0.23% | 0.22% | 0.31% | 0.41% | 0.38% |
| Native Hawaiian or Pacific Islander alone (NH) | x | x | 2 | 38 | 72 | x | x | 0.01% | 0.15% | 0.29% |
| Other race alone (NH) | 8 | 6 | 4 | 12 | 65 | 0.03% | 0.03% | 0.02% | 0.05% | 0.26% |
| Mixed race or Multiracial (NH) | x | x | 186 | 259 | 532 | x | x | 0.76% | 1.04% | 2.11% |
| Hispanic or Latino (any race) | 80 | 58 | 463 | 1,288 | 2,208 | 0.32% | 0.25% | 1.90% | 5.17% | 8.74% |
| Total | 24,991 | 23,363 | 24,426 | 24,895 | 25,262 | 100.00% | 100.00% | 100.00% | 100.00% | 100.00% |

=== 2000 census ===
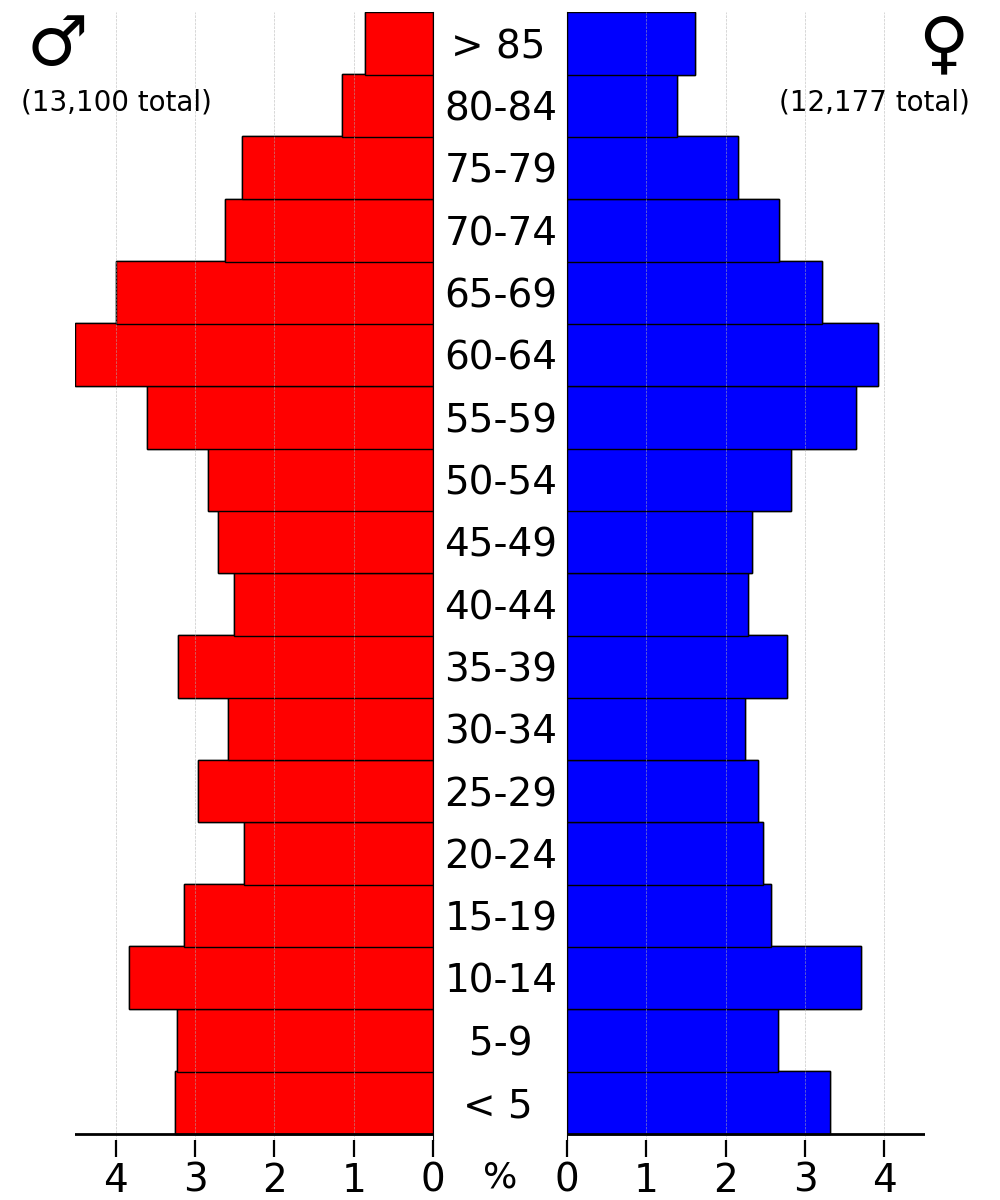
2022 US Census population pyramid for Todd County, from ACS 5-year estimates

As of the census of 2000, there were 24,426 people, 9,342 households, and 6,511 families in Todd County. The population density was 25.8 per square mile (10.0/km^{2}). There were 11,900 housing units at an average density of 12.6 per square mile (4.9/km^{2}). The racial makeup of the county was 97.54% White, 0.11% Black or African American, 0.48% Native American, 0.31% Asian, 0.01% Pacific Islander, 0.72% from other races, and 0.82% from two or more races. 1.90% of the population were Hispanic or Latino of any race. 52.1% were of German, 11.3% Norwegian and 5.6% Polish ancestry.

There were 9,342 households, out of which 31.80% had children under the age of 18 living with them, 59.80% were married couples living together, 6.10% had a female householder with no husband present, and 30.30% were non-families. 26.30% of all households were made up of individuals, and 13.00% had someone living alone who was 65 years of age or older. The average household size was 2.58 and the average family size was 3.14.

The county population contained 27.40% under the age of 18, 8.10% from 18 to 24, 24.70% from 25 to 44, 23.80% from 45 to 64, and 16.10% who were 65 years of age or older. The median age was 38 years. For every 100 females there were 101.80 males. For every 100 females age 18 and over, there were 102.00 males.

The median income for a household in the county was $32,281, and the median income for a family was $39,920. Males had a median income of $28,630 versus $20,287 for females. The per capita income for the county was $15,658. About 9.60% of families and 12.90% of the population were below the poverty line, including 14.60% of those under age 18 and 13.50% of those age 65 or over.

=== Amish ===
Todd County has a large concentration of Amish, about the same population size as the Amish settlement at Harmony. It is home to five different Amish communities, with altogether seven church districts in 2013, which indicates a total population of about 1000 people.

| Location | Founded in | Church dis- tricts in 2013 | Affiliation |
|---|---|---|---|
| Bertha/Hewitt | 1973 | 1 | Swartzentruber |
| Long Prairie/Osakis | 1995 | 2 | |
| Clarissa/Browerville | 2001 | 2 | |
| Bertha/Staples | 2003 | 1 | Swartzentruber |
| Eagle Bend | 2007 | 1 | |

== Communities ==
=== Cities ===
- Bertha
- Browerville
- Burtrum
- Clarissa
- Eagle Bend
- Grey Eagle
- Hewitt
- Long Prairie (county seat)
- Osakis (partly in Douglas County)
- Staples (partly in Wadena County)
- West Union

=== Unincorporated communities ===
- Philbrook
- Pillsbury
- Ward Springs

=== Townships ===
- Bartlett
- Bertha
- Birchdale
- Bruce
- Burleene
- Burnhamville
- Eagle Valley
- Fawn Lake
- Germania
- Gordon
- Grey Eagle
- Hartford
- Iona
- Kandota
- Leslie
- Little Elk
- Little Sauk
- Long Prairie
- Moran
- Reynolds
- Round Prairie
- Staples
- Stowe Prairie
- Turtle Creek
- Villard
- Ward
- West Union
- Wykeham

== Government and politics ==
Todd County voters tend to vote Republican. In 76% of national elections since 1960, the county selected the Republican Party candidate (as of 2024). In 2016, 2020, and 2024, Todd County was Donald Trump's second strongest county in Minnesota behind neighboring Morrison County all three times.

United States presidential election results for Todd County, Minnesota
| Year | Republican | | Democratic | | Third party(ies) | |
| Year | No. | % | No. | % | No. | % |
|---|---|---|---|---|---|---|
| 1892 | 1,251 | 42.09% | 1,118 | 37.62% | 603 | 20.29% |
| 1896 | 2,043 | 52.28% | 1,739 | 44.50% | 126 | 3.22% |
| 1900 | 2,212 | 56.28% | 1,487 | 37.84% | 231 | 5.88% |
| 1904 | 2,961 | 74.83% | 741 | 18.73% | 255 | 6.44% |
| 1908 | 2,334 | 57.37% | 1,305 | 32.08% | 429 | 10.55% |
| 1912 | 1,038 | 27.76% | 1,068 | 28.56% | 1,633 | 43.67% |
| 1916 | 1,919 | 44.50% | 1,922 | 44.57% | 471 | 10.92% |
| 1920 | 5,448 | 71.10% | 1,464 | 19.11% | 750 | 9.79% |
| 1924 | 4,441 | 53.00% | 557 | 6.65% | 3,381 | 40.35% |
| 1928 | 5,682 | 59.81% | 3,733 | 39.29% | 85 | 0.89% |
| 1932 | 3,114 | 33.17% | 6,023 | 64.16% | 250 | 2.66% |
| 1936 | 3,780 | 37.79% | 5,627 | 56.26% | 595 | 5.95% |
| 1940 | 6,302 | 57.73% | 4,553 | 41.71% | 61 | 0.56% |
| 1944 | 5,636 | 59.37% | 3,803 | 40.06% | 54 | 0.57% |
| 1948 | 4,166 | 43.69% | 5,157 | 54.08% | 212 | 2.22% |
| 1952 | 6,731 | 65.92% | 3,439 | 33.68% | 41 | 0.40% |
| 1956 | 5,075 | 56.51% | 3,882 | 43.22% | 24 | 0.27% |
| 1960 | 5,255 | 50.85% | 5,051 | 48.88% | 28 | 0.27% |
| 1964 | 4,006 | 41.29% | 5,673 | 58.47% | 23 | 0.24% |
| 1968 | 4,883 | 51.62% | 3,992 | 42.20% | 585 | 6.18% |
| 1972 | 5,387 | 53.14% | 4,270 | 42.12% | 480 | 4.74% |
| 1976 | 4,278 | 38.03% | 6,530 | 58.05% | 440 | 3.91% |
| 1980 | 6,451 | 53.27% | 4,975 | 41.08% | 685 | 5.66% |
| 1984 | 6,585 | 58.25% | 4,657 | 41.19% | 63 | 0.56% |
| 1988 | 5,633 | 52.40% | 5,023 | 46.73% | 94 | 0.87% |
| 1992 | 3,990 | 35.93% | 4,059 | 36.55% | 3,055 | 27.51% |
| 1996 | 4,078 | 38.11% | 4,520 | 42.24% | 2,103 | 19.65% |
| 2000 | 6,031 | 54.37% | 4,132 | 37.25% | 929 | 8.38% |
| 2004 | 6,945 | 56.86% | 5,034 | 41.21% | 235 | 1.92% |
| 2008 | 6,637 | 54.15% | 5,277 | 43.05% | 343 | 2.80% |
| 2012 | 6,719 | 56.93% | 4,819 | 40.83% | 265 | 2.25% |
| 2016 | 8,485 | 70.75% | 2,783 | 23.21% | 725 | 6.05% |
| 2020 | 9,753 | 73.57% | 3,286 | 24.79% | 218 | 1.64% |
| 2024 | 10,392 | 75.75% | 3,072 | 22.39% | 254 | 1.85% |

County Board of Commissioners
| Position | Name | District | Next Election |
|---|---|---|---|
| Commissioner and Vice chair | Barb Becker | District 1 | 2024 |
| Commissioner | Tim Denny | District 2 | 2026 |
| Commissioner | Rod Erickson | District 3 | 2024 |
| Commissioner | Lew Noska | District 4 | 2026 |
| Commissioner and Chairperson | Randy Neumann | District 5 | 2024 |

State Legislature (2025-2027)
| Position | Name | Affiliation | District |
|---|---|---|---|
| Senate | Paul Utke | Republican | District 5 |
| House of Representatives | Mike Wiener | Republican | District 5B |

U.S Congress (2025-2027)
| Position | Name | Affiliation | District |
|---|---|---|---|
| House of Representatives | Michelle Fischbach | Republican | 7th |
| Senate | Amy Klobuchar | Democrat | N/A |
| Senate | Tina Smith | Democrat | N/A |

== See also ==
- Dromedary Hills
- National Register of Historic Places listings in Todd County, Minnesota
