= Helmer (name) =

Helmer is both a masculine given name and a surname. In the former use it is common in Scandinavia. It is a German compound word: heil "healthy, well" and mer "famous" or helm "helmet" and her "warrior."

== Surname ==
- Adam Helmer (1754 – 1830), American Revolutionary War hero
- Alexis Helmer (1892–1915), Canadian military officer
- Bessie Bradwell Helmer (1858–1927), American lawyer
- Bryan Helmer (born 1972), Canadian ice hockey player
- Cheryl Helmer, American politician and educator
- Clyde Helmer (1916–1945), Australian rules footballer
- Elisabeth Helmer (1854–after 1912), Norwegian photographer
- Harry Helmer (1884–1971), American college sports coach
- Hermann Helmer (1849–1919), German-Austrian architect
- Howard Helmer, American chef
- Jeremy Helmer (born 1997), Dutch football player
- Jim Helmer (born c. 1950), American track and field coach
- John Helmer, multiple people
- Olaf Helmer (1910–2011), German-American logician and futurologist
- Per Helmer (1897–1966), Norwegian businessperson
- Robert C. Helmer, American academic
- Roberta Helmer (1950–2018), American novelist
- Roger Helmer (born 1944), British politician
- Rosie Helmer (1890–1951), Canadian ice hockey and baseball coach
- Thomas Helmer (born 1965), German football player
- Veit Helmer (born 1968), German film director and screenwriter

== Given name ==
=== First name ===
- Helmer Alexandersson (1886–1927), Swedish composer and violinist
- Helmer Edlund (1900–1977), Swedish football player
- Helmer Grundström (1904–1986), Swedish writer and poet
- Helmer Hanssen (1870–1956), Norwegian explorer
- Helmer Hermandsen (1871–1958), Norwegian sport shooter
- Hélmer Herrera (1951–1998), Colombian drug trafficker
- Helmer Johansson (1895–1955), Swedish politician
- Helmer Jõgi (born 1952), Estonian politician
- Helmer Mikkelsen (1930–1989), Norwegian politician
- Helmer Molander (1892–1963), Swedish politician
- Helmer Mörner (1895–1962), Swedish equestrian
- Helmer Osslund (1866–1938), Swedish painter
- Helmer Pedersen (1930–1987), Danish-born New Zealand sailor
- Helmer Ringgren (1917–2012), Swedish theologian

=== Middle name ===
- Karl Helmer Gustavson (1896–1973), Swedish chemist
