= Hjalmar (given name) =

- Pronunciation: Swedish: [ˈjǎlmar] Norwegian: [ˈjɑ̂ɫmɑr]
- Gender: Male

Origin
- Origin: Old Norse
- Meaning: Helmeted Warrior

Other names
- Related names: Helmer, Elmer, Djalma, Jelmer

Hjalmar is a Scandinavian male given name, from Old Norse Hjálmarr. Hjalmar is the name of a legendary warrior and lover in Swedish mythology.

People with the given name Hjalmar include:

- Hjalmar Andersen (1923–2013), Norwegian speed skater
- Hjalmar Åström (1888–1957), Swedish lieutenant general
- Hjalmar Bergman (1883–1931), Swedish author
- Hjalmar Branting (1860–1925), prime minister of Sweden
- Hjalmar Dahl (1891–1960), Finnish journalist, translator and writer
- Hjalmar Fries (1891–1973), Norwegian actor
- Hjalmar Frisell (1880–1967), Swedish military officer
- Hjalmar Frisk (1900–1984), Swedish linguist
- Hjalmar Gullberg (1898–1961), Swedish poet
- Hjalmar Hammarskjöld (1862–1953), prime minister of Sweden
- Hjalmar Johansen (1867–1913), Norwegian polar explorer
- Hjalmar Mäe (1901–1978), Estonian politician
- Hjalmar Mehr (1910–1979), Swedish politician
- Hjalmar Mellin (1854–1933), Finnish mathematician
- Hjalmar Carl Nygaard (1906–1963), U.S. Representative from North Dakota
- Hjalmar Nygaard (boxer) (1900–1936), Norwegian boxer
- Hjalmar Petersen (1890–1968), American politician
- Hjalmar Peterson, Swedish singer and comedian
- Hjalmar Schacht (1877–1970), German economist, President of the Reichsbank in the Weimar Republic and Nazi Germany until 1939
- Hjalmar Siilasvuo (1892–1947), Finnish lieutenant general
- Hjalmar Söderberg (1869–1941), Swedish author
- Hjalmar von Sydow (1862–1932), Swedish lawyer and politician
- Hjalmar Welhaven (1850–1922), Norwegian architect

== See also ==
- Djalma, Portuguese variation
- Helmer (disambiguation)
