= Carl Erengisle Hyltén-Cavallius =

Swedish pharmacist and chemist

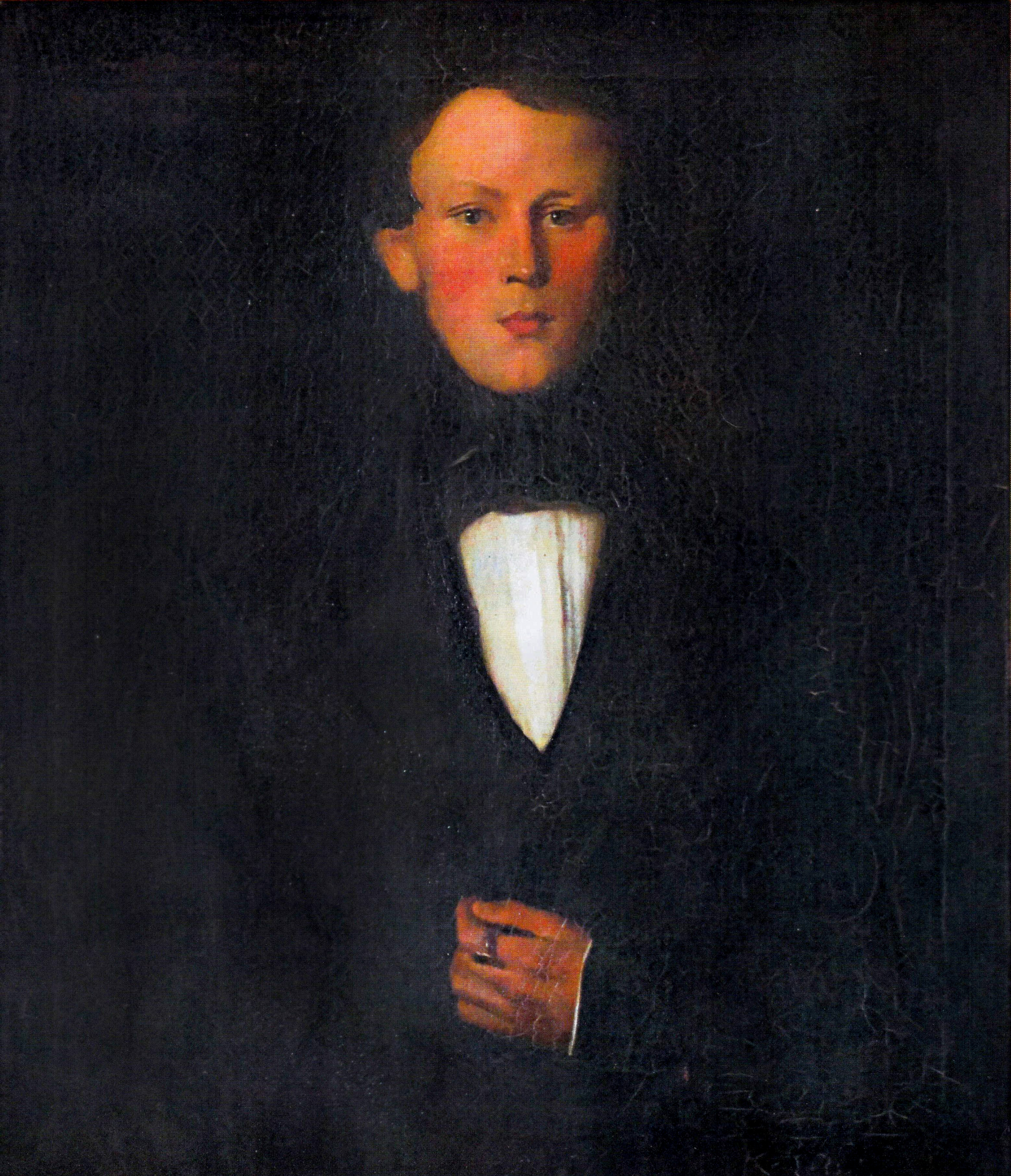
- Born: 19 February 1817; Vislanda, Sweden
- Died: 29 October 1853 (aged 36); Gothenburg, Sweden
- Scientific career
- Fields: Chemistry

Carl Erengisle Hyltén-Cavallius (19 February 1817 – 29 October 1853) was a Swedish pharmacist and chemist; he invented the now dominating technology of tanning by using chromium salts.

== Biography ==
He was born in Vislanda as the son of the priest Carl Fredrik Cavallius and his wife Anna Elisabet Hylténius. Like his siblings, the naval officer and botanist Gustaf Erik, and the ethnologist and diplomat Gunnar Olof, he transformed his surname into a combination of his father's and his mother's names, according to his grandfather's wishes. In international publications, where his scientific achievements have been noted, his surname has on several occasions been distorted to Hyltén-Cavallin and also to Cavallin, Cavalin and even French Cavalin.

He studied pharmacy and chemistry at the Uppsala University and at the Stockholm Institute of Technology (later KTH Royal Institute of Technology in Stockholm) and also received a journeyman's certificate as a tanner at the latter school.

== Operations ==
He was active as a teacher (assistant professor of chemistry) at the Stockholm Institute of Technology between 1840 and 1843, when he also conducted research in chemistry. It was in connection with this he invented a method for tanning animal skins with chromium salts, a method that would revolutionize the leather industry throughout the world. A very time-consuming, dirty and smelly method of tanning, with different vegetable substances (bark of different types of wood), was replaced by a faster, cheaper and more odorless process. It is the most common tanning method today, but it has negative effects on the environment and people if the chromium residues are not taken care of effectively.

During the years 1843 to 1850 he owned a pharmacy in Kungälv, in western Sweden. In connection with this, he established a tannery where he had the opportunity to develop his new tanning method, which he applied for a patent in 1850. In the latter year, he got a job as an assistant professor in chemistry at the Chalmers handicraft school (later Chalmers University of Technology). Meanwhile, at this school he wrote the Elementary Course in Inorganic Chemistry which was published in 1854.

The patent that was taken out, for the new chrome tanning method, was limited to Sweden. Hyltén-Cavallius died of blood poisoning, 36 years old, in 1853 in Gothenburg, which is why he never had time to apply for a world patent for his tanning method. At the "Fourth Biennial Conference of the International Union of Leather Technologists and Chemists Societies (IULTCS)", which took place at the Royal Institute of Technology in Stockholm, in 1955, he was recognized as the inventor of the epoch-making tanning method.

The president of the IULTCS at that time, Professor K. H. Gustavson, told about Hyltén-Cavallius achievements in his keynote speech:

The name Cavallin is familiar to most of us from the early history of the chrome tanning process. In the outstanding treatise on chemical technology of its day, Muspratt's Chemistry, it is stated in the early 1860 edition that chrome salts were first used for tanning by Cavallin; a statement often repeated in later books on chrome tanning, none however, giving the source of information or literature reference.

The results of his experimentation are laid down in Swedish Patent N:o. 1530, granted to him in April 1850. Hyltén-Cavallius stresses the fact that the new method differs from the conventional processes of tanning in so far as no bark or other substances containing tannic acid is required; the tanning being effected by »Chemical salts» such as bichromate of potassium after the hides have been struck through by a solution of »minerals». He points to the speed of the process and stresses that his method will not lead to an »ultimate devastation of the oak forests». Various modes of tanning are exemplified. Thus, tanning with chromium salts entirely, pre-tanning with alum and chromium salts or with alum and ferrous sulfate (copperas). In the latter instance, the pre-tannage is followed up by a bichromate bath. Also, combinations with vegetable tannins are mentioned, e. g. vegetable-mineral tannages in combination.

His important contribution is a landmark in the history of the mineral tannage, being a well-balanced combination of three mineral tanning agents.

== Family ==
Together with his wife Anna Dorotea (née Wettermark) he had the children Elisabeth Ulrika, born in 1850 and Carl born in 1853. The grandson Carl Wilhelm Oseen (1879–1944), was a professor of theoretical physics and chairman of the Nobel Committee for Physics.
