= Church of St. Joseph-Catholic =

Church of St. Joseph-Catholic may refer to:

- Church of St. Joseph-Catholic (Browerville, Minnesota), listed on the National Register of Historic Places in Todd County, Minnesota
- Church of St. Joseph-Catholic (St. Joseph, Minnesota), listed on the National Register of Historic Places in Stearns County, Minnesota
