= Gunnar Olof Hyltén-Cavallius =

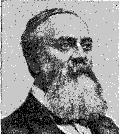
- Born: 18 May 1818; Hönetorp, Wislanda socken, Småland, Sweden
- Died: 5 July 1889 (aged 71); Sunnanvik, Småland
- Education: Uppsala University, MPhil 1839
- Notable work: Wärend och Wirdarne; ett försök i svensk ethnologi (in Swedish). Stockholm: P.A. Norstedt. 1863–64.
- Parent: Carl Fredrik Cavallius Anna Elisabet Hyltenius
- Relatives: Bp. Olof Cavallius (1648-1703) (great-grandfather's brother)

Gunnar Olof Hyltén-Cavallius (1818–1889) was a Swedish scholar of cultural history, librarian, theatre director, and diplomat.

Gunnar was the son of a clergyman from Vislanda, Småland, and the brother of the chemist Carl Erengisle Hyltén-Cavallius. While he was a student at the Uppsala University, he was impressed with the late currents of Gothicismus. He was an employee at the Swedish Royal Library in the period 1839–1856, the director of the Royal Theatres, 1856–1860, and the Chargé d'affaires in the Empire of Brazil from 1860–1864.

Gunnar was early interested in the collection of fairy tales and legends, and together with George Stephens, he published the first collection of Svenska folksagor och äfventyr (Swedish Folktales and Adventures) in 1844–1849. His main work was Wärend och Wirdarne (1-2, 1863-1868), which was inspired both by Jacob Grimm's Deutsche Mythologie (1835) and evolutionist theories of Sven Nilsson. Wärend och Wirdarne can be seen as the foundation of Swedish ethnology.

During his last years, he lived in the parish of Skatelöv in Småland, and his collections were the foundation of the Museum of Småland in Växjö, the first Swedish province museum.

== Sources ==
- Nationalencyklopedin
