= Helmer =

Helmer is a surname and a given name of Germanic origin.

Helmer may also refer to:

== Places ==
- Helmer, Idaho, United States
- Helmer, Indiana, United States
- Helmer, Michigan, United States
- Mount Helmer, on the border of Alberta and British Columbia, Canada

== Other uses ==
- Helmer, colloquial term for the showrunner of a television series
- "Helmer & Son", 2006 short film directed by Søren Pilmark
- Fellner & Helmer, architecture studio founded in 1873 by Austrian architect Ferdinand Fellner and Hermann Helmer.
- Nora and Torvald Helmer, main characters in the play A Doll's House
- Thomas Helmer (born 1965), German footballer

== See also ==
- Helm (disambiguation)
- Hjalmar
