= Swan Turnblad =

American newspaper publisher (1860–1933)

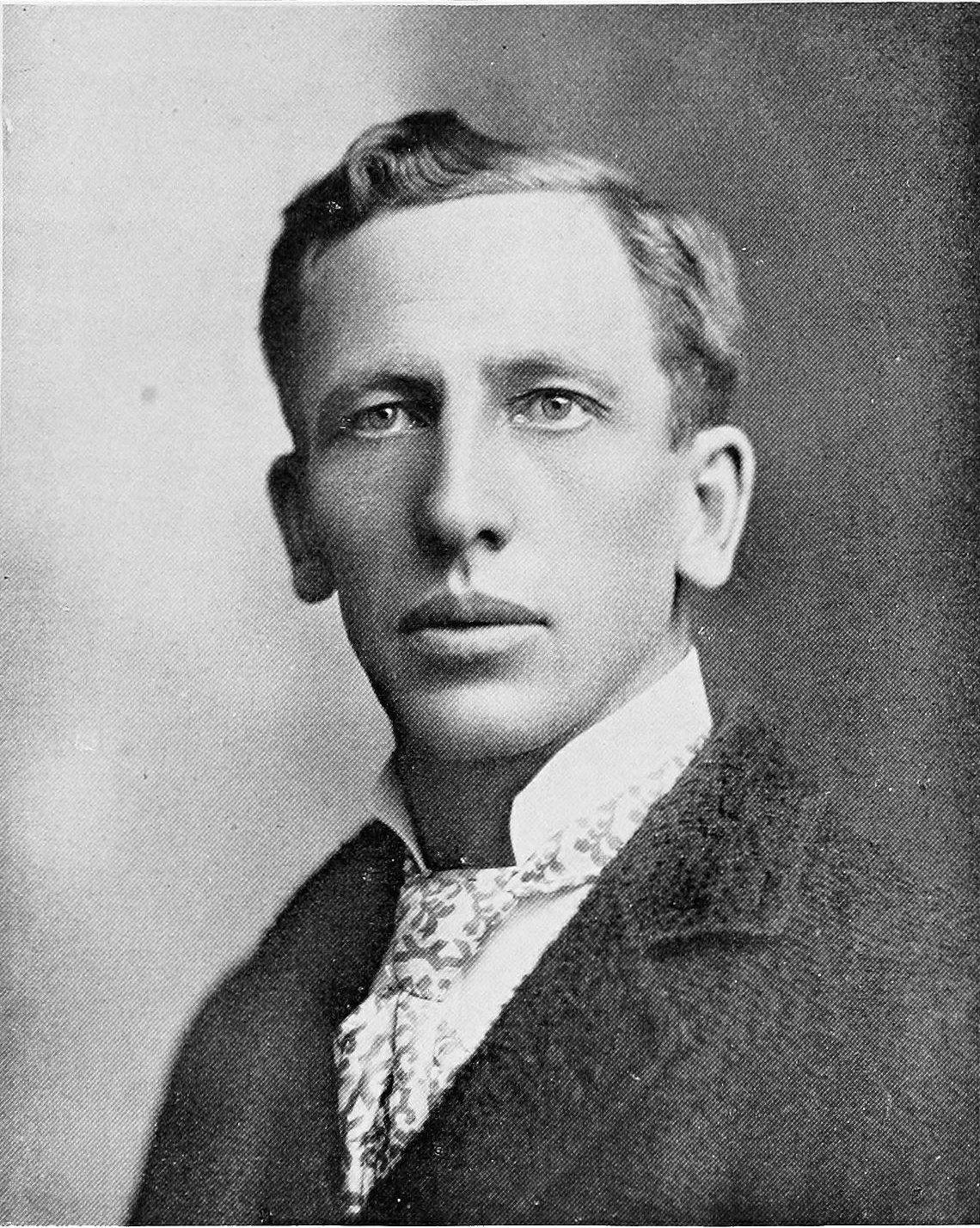
Swan J. Turnblad, 1890s

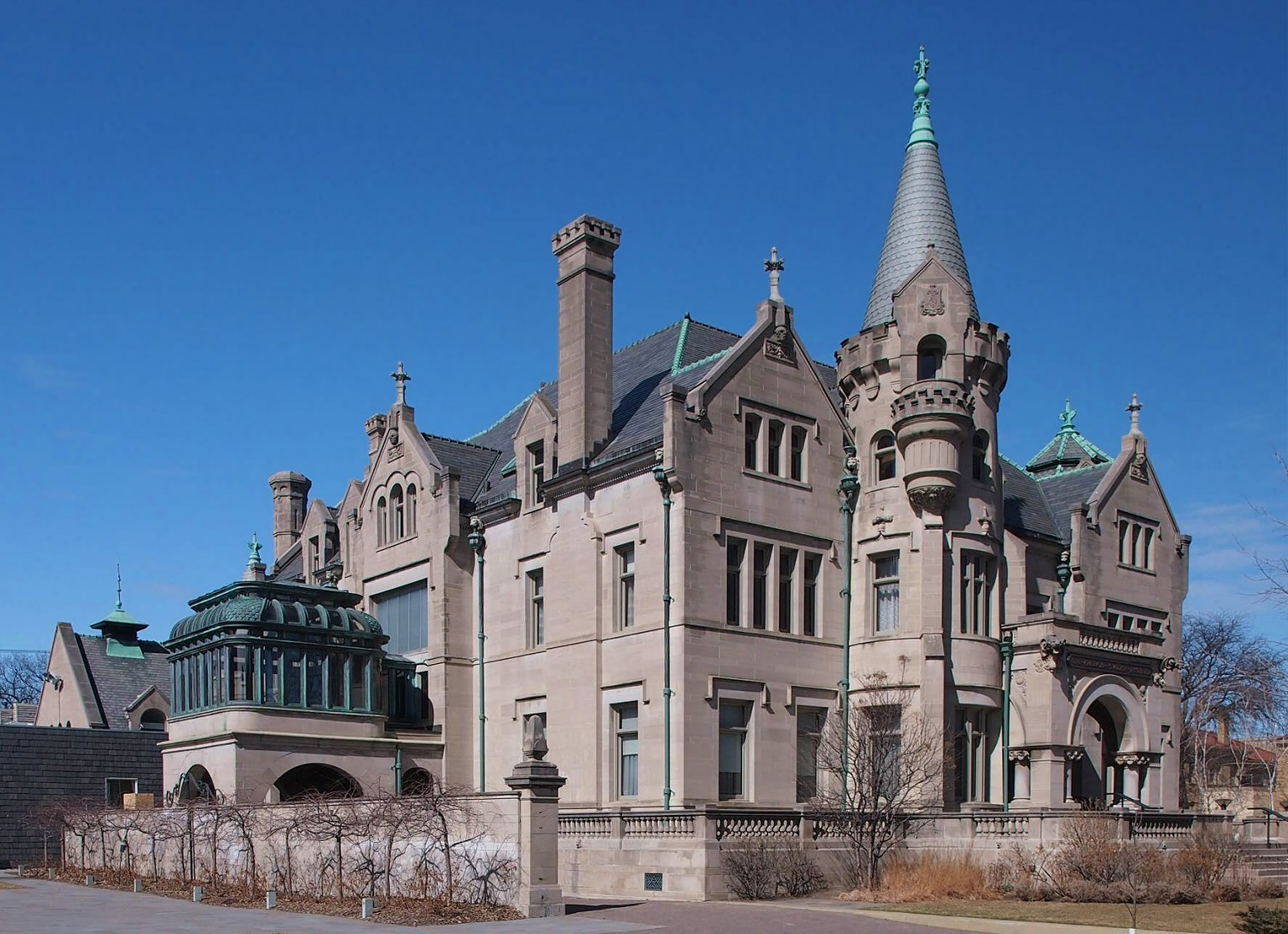
Swan Turnblad Mansion

Swan Johan Turnblad (born Sven Johan Olofsson; October 7, 1860 – May 17, 1933) was an American newspaper publisher. Turnblad was the manager of the Svenska Amerikanska Posten, a Swedish language newspaper in Minneapolis, Minnesota. Later in his life he donated property and money to help create the American Swedish Institute.

== Early life ==
Turnblad was born Sven Johan Olofsson in Tubbemåla, Vislanda, Sweden, in 1860.

== Svenska Amerikanska Posten ==
In 1887, Turnblad became the manager of the Swedish-language newspaper Svenska Amerikanska Posten. His brother, Magnus Turnblad, joined him as the editor in 1890. Under Turnblad's management circulation increased steadily, growing from just 1,400 in 1887 to 40,000 by 1900. In The success of Svenska Amerikanska Posten together with his other investments made Turnblad very wealthy.

== American Swedish Institute ==
In 1903, Turnblad commissioned the building of a mansion on Park Avenue in Minneapolis. Turnblad had the Minneapolis firm of Boehme and Cordella design a Châteauesque-style 33-room mansion for him, his wife, and their daughter. Built on a combination of six city lots, the home cost $1.5 million ($53.7 million in 2025) and took four years to complete. The family moved into their new home in 1908. While it was their official residence, they spent most of their time living in an apartment across the street after 1915. After Turnblad's wife died in 1929, he and his daughter moved into the apartment full-time and turned their former home into a museum for Swedish customs and culture.

== Death ==
Turnblad had a heart attack. He died several days later on May 17, 1933, at Abbott Northwestern Hospital. He was buried in Lakewood Cemetery.
