= Ward Township, Todd County, Minnesota =

Ward Township, Minnesota
- Township
- Location within the state of Minnesota Ward Township, Minnesota (the United States)
- Coordinates: 46°8′57″N 94°49′51″W
- Country: United States
- State: Minnesota
- County: Todd

Area
  - Total: 36.3 sq mi (94.0 km^{2})
  - Land: 35.9 sq mi (92.9 km^{2})
  - Water: 0.42 sq mi (1.1 km^{2})
- Elevation: 1,273 ft (388 m)

Population (2020)
  - Total: 474
  - Density: 13/sq mi (5.1/km^{2})
- Time zone: UTC-6 (Central (CST))
  - Summer (DST): UTC-5 (CDT)
- ZIP code: 56438
- Area code: 320
- FIPS code: 27-68098
- GNIS feature ID: 0665915

Ward Township is a township in Todd County, Minnesota, United States. The population was 471 at the 2000 census and 474 at the 2020 census.

Ward Township was organized in 1877, and named after Ward Township, Randolph County, Indiana, the native home of a share of the early settlers. The sculptor Joseph Kiselewski was born in Ward Township early in the 20th century. Examples of his work can be seen at the American Heritage National Bank and in front of Christ the King church. Both are in near-by Browerville. Blazey Kiselewski, Joseph's father, was likely one of the first Polish immigrants in Ward Township. He took up farming there in 1893. Ward Township had a post office from 1882 until 1887.

== Geography ==
According to the United States Census Bureau, the township has a total area of 36.3 square miles (94.0 km^{2}); 35.9 square miles (92.9 km^{2}) is land and 0.4 square mile (1.1 km^{2}) (1.16%) is water. The Long Prairie River flows northwardly through the township.

Horseshoe Lake, at 120 acres, is found in the township. It has a public boat access in its Northeast corner. The fish species living in the lake include black bullhead, black crappie, bluegill, brown bullhead, hybrid sunfish, largemouth bass, northern pike, pumpkinseed, walleye, yellow perch, bowfin (dogfish), redhorse, white sucker, central mudminnow, golden shiner, Iowa darter, and tadpole madtom. Horseshoe Lake has a maximum depth of twenty-four feet.

=== Wildlife Management Area ===
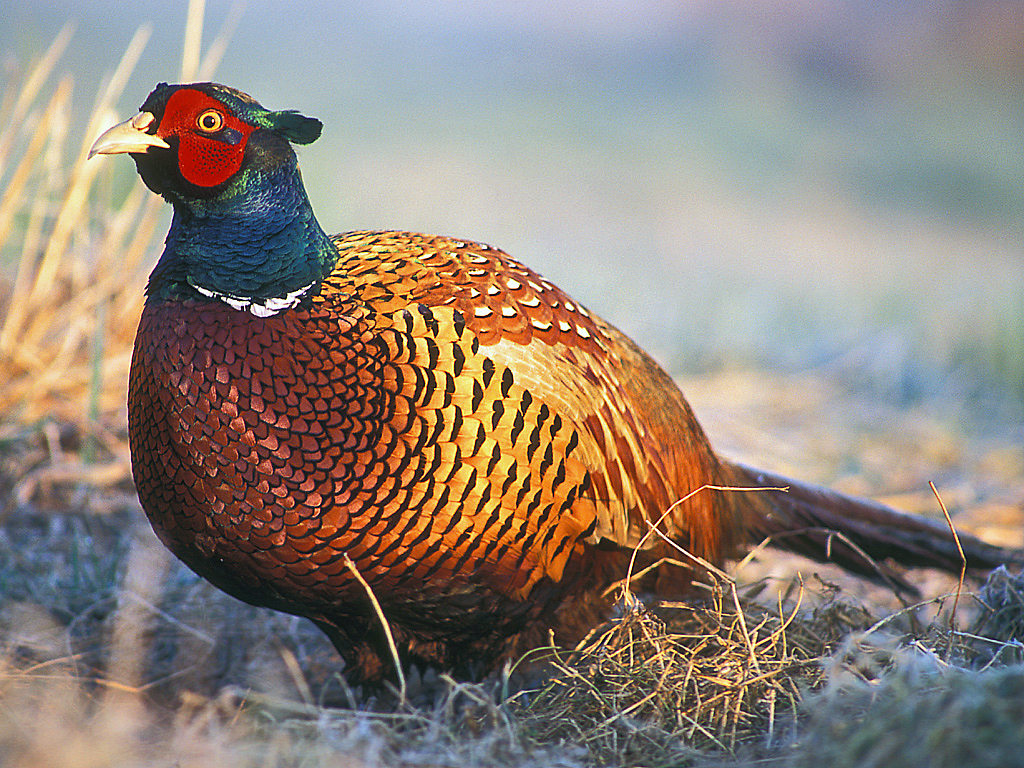
The Ring Neck Pheasant is found on the Long Prairie River Wildlife Management Area.

The 262 acre Long Prairie River WMA is in sections 11, 14, and 22 of the township. The Long Prairie River flows through the WMA and there is a canoe access on the West side of the Area. The WMA is dominated by lowland grass, cattails, brush areas and some restored upland prairie. Management of the unit focuses on maintaining and improving the habitat for a diversity of native plants and wildlife, with emphasis on managing grassland habitats.

== Demographics ==
As of the census of 2000, there were 471 people, 176 households, and 134 families residing in the township. The population density was 13.1 people per square mile (5.1 people/km^{2}). There were 213 housing units at an average density of 5.9 units per square mile (2.3 units/km^{2}). The racial makeup of the township was 99.36% White, 0.21% Asian, and 0.42% from two or more races. Hispanic or Latino of any race were 1.06% of the population.

There were 176 households, out of which 34.1% had children under the age of 18 living with them, 69.9% were married couples living together, 3.4% had a female householder with no husband present, and 23.3% were non-families. 22.2% of all households were made up of individuals, and 6.8% had someone living alone who was 65 years of age or older. The average household size was 2.68 and the average family size was 3.16.

In the township the population was spread out, with 28.5% under the age of 18, 5.9% from 18 to 24, 22.5% from 25 to 44, 27.2% from 45 to 64, and 15.9% who were 65 years of age or older. The median age was 40 years. For every 100 females, there were 114.1 males. For every 100 females age 18 and over, there were 116.0 males.

The median income for a household in the township was $33,304, and the median income for a family was $37,031. Males had a median income of $29,750 versus $22,500 for females. The per capita income for the township was $15,830. None of the families and 1.9% of the population were living below the poverty line, including no under eighteens and 2.6% of those over 64.
