= Victor Cordella =

Polish-American architect (1872–1937)

- Wiktor Kordela
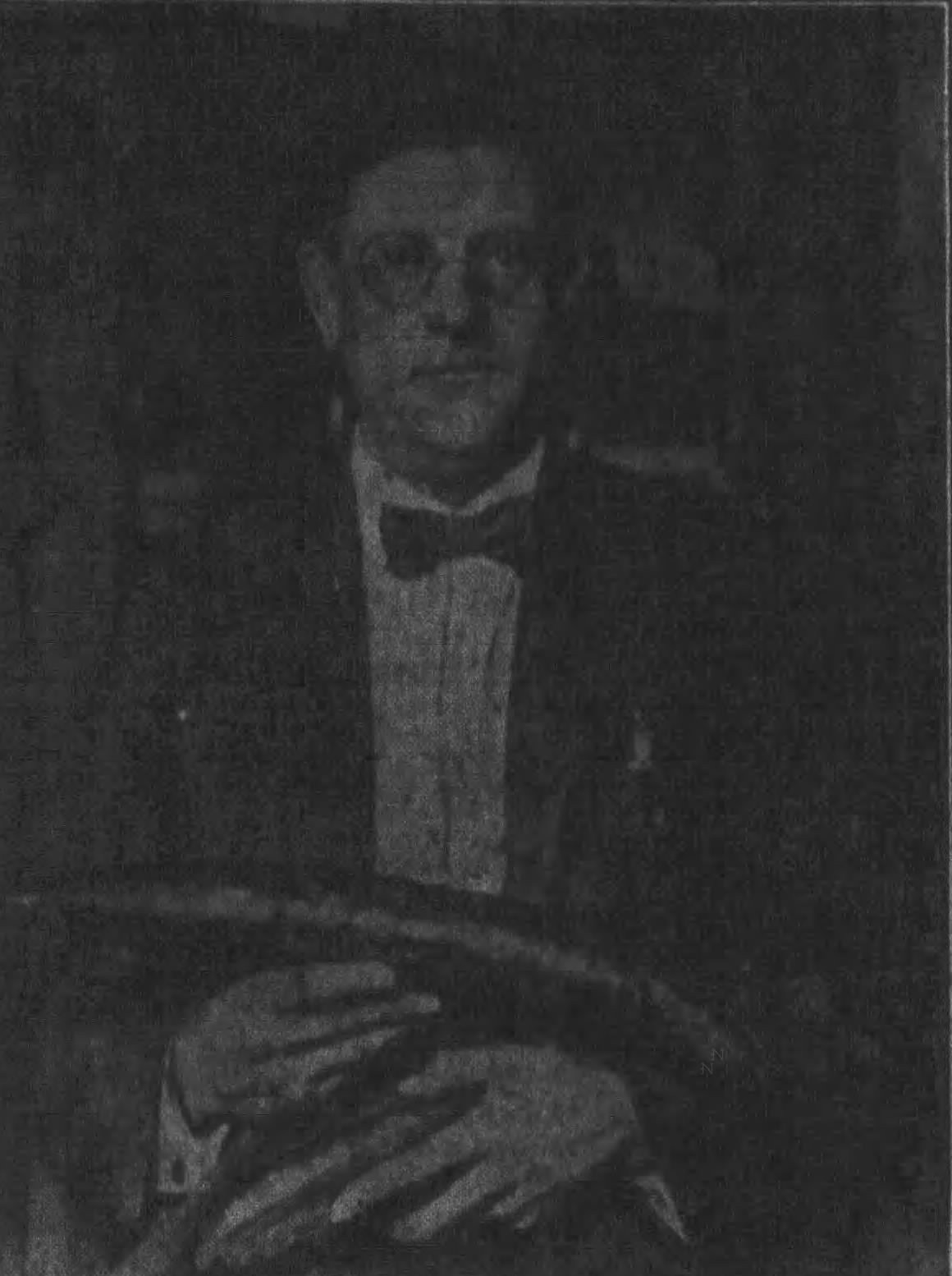
- Cordella in 1921, holding cucumbers
- Born: January 1, 1872; Kraków, Austrian Poland
- Died: April 12, 1937 (aged 65); Minneapolis, Minnesota
- Education: Royal Art Academy
- Occupation: Architect
- Years active: 1903–1927
- Buildings: Swan Turnblad Mansion; Saint Mary's Orthodox Cathedral; Church of St. Casimir; Church of St. Joseph

Victor Cordella (January 1, 1872 – April 12, 1937) was a Polish-American architect known for designing churches for Eastern European congregations in Minnesota.

== Early life and education ==
Wiktor Kordela was born on January 1, 1872, in Kraków to Italian father Marian, a sculptor, and Polish mother Florence, an artist. After studying at the Royal Art Academy in Kraków, and completing further studies in Lviv under Michael Kowalczuk, Cordella immigrated to Minnesota in 1893, and began to study architecture under Cass Gilbert.

== Career ==
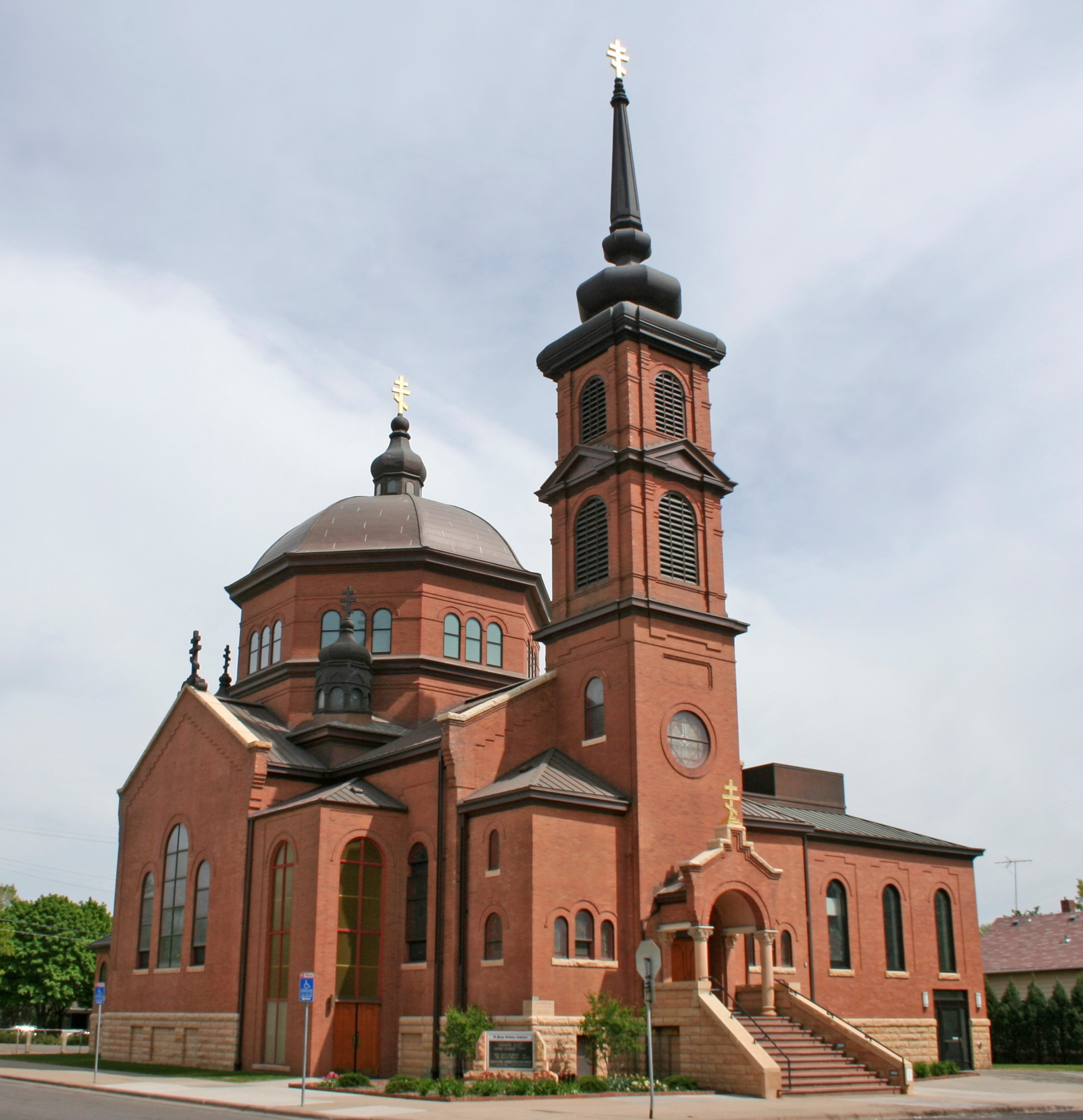
St. Mary's Orthodox Cathedral

From 1903 to 1911, Cordella worked in conjunction with Christopher A. Boeheme as the Boehme & Cordella architecture firm. One of their first commissions was the 1903 Gluek's Restaurant in downtown Minneapolis. They also designed the Grain Belt Beer tavern in Minneapolis on East Hennepin Ave, the P. F. Laum & Sons Building, and the Swan Turnblad Mansion, built in 1908.

Cordella's designs embodied the ethnic identities of their congregations, and the Eastern Orthodox and Catholic churches in the Upper Midwest that he designed helped shape the identities of the immigrants who worshipped in them. He worked with many different ethnicities, including Slovaks, Ruthenians, Ukrainians, and Russians. One of the first churches that he designed was St. Mary's Russian Orthodox Cathedral in Minneapolis. Due to unease in the congregation of St. Mary's two offshoot churches were founded that Cordella designed; in 1913, he designed the Byzantine Catholic Church of St. Constantine, (Note: This building was closed in 1970, to be demolished and replaced by a new building.) also in Minneapolis, and in 1926, he designed the Romanesque St. John the Baptist Greek Catholic Church and rectory in Minneapolis.

Cordella also designed number of Latin churches. In 1904, he designed the Polish Church of St. Casimir in Saint Paul. He also designed the Polish-Baroque Church of St. Joseph in Browerville (1907), St. Peter's and St. Mary of Czestochowa parishes in Delano (1913), the Romanesque-style St. John the Baptist in Vermillion (1914), St. Francis Xavier in Buffalo (1916), the Renaissance Revival-style Sts. Cyril and Methodius in Minneapolis (1917), St. Stanislaus in Perham (1922), combination Spanish Mission and French Renaissance-style St. Luke's in Sherburn (1922), Holy Cross in North Prairie (1922), the Baroque Revival-style Our Lady of Lourdes in Little Falls (1923), and Holy Cross in Northeast Minneapolis (1927). In total, Cordella designed around twenty churches for various immigrant ethnic groups.

== Personal life and death ==
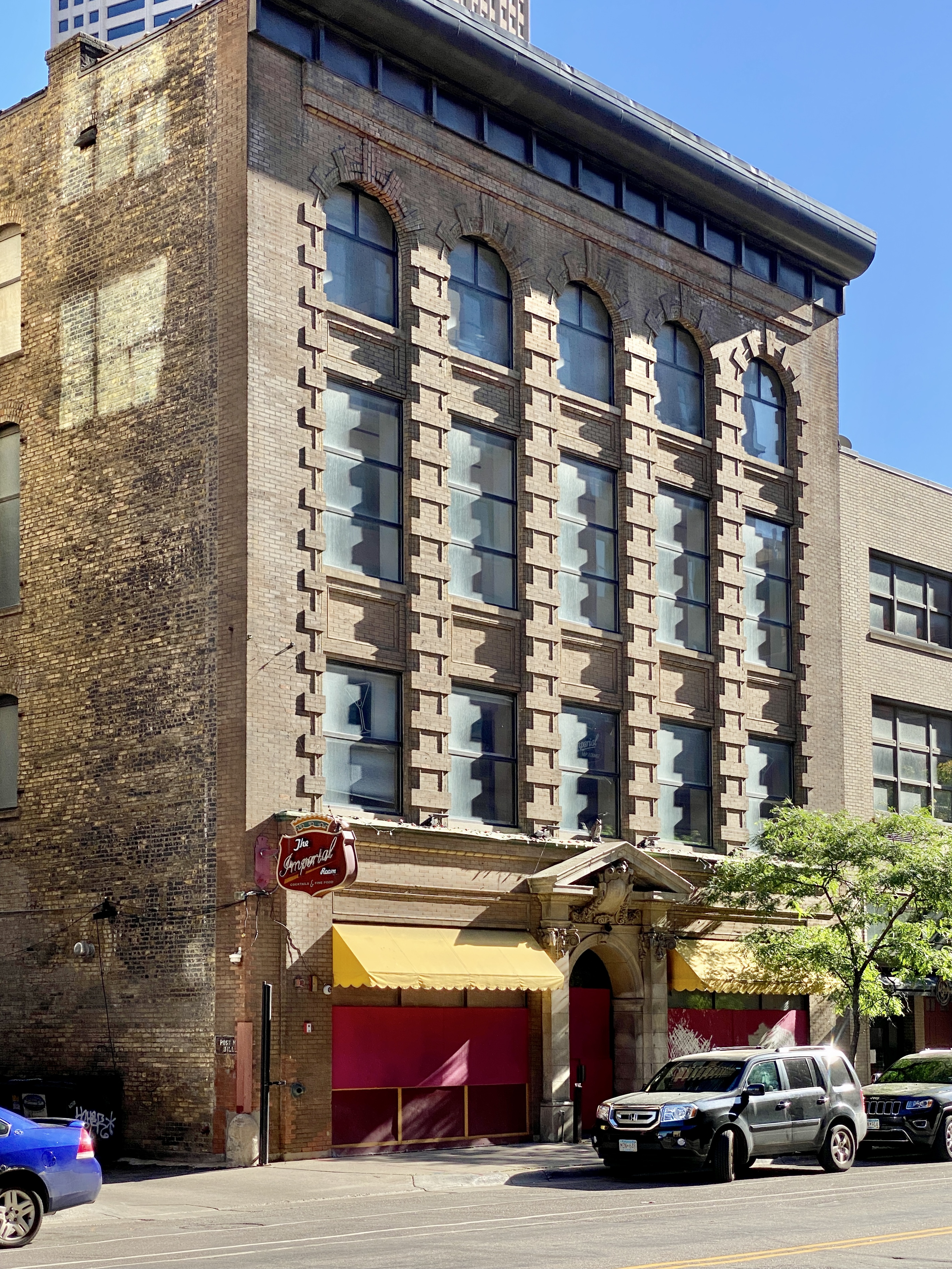
P. F. Laum & Sons Building (1903)

Cordella married Ruth Maser on September 15, 1902. Cordella married Minnie Beckwith on October 9, 1918. In 1921, he was featured in the Minneapolis Journal for growing a 19-inch cucumber. The Great Depression greatly impacted Cordella and his wife; in 1930, he was unable to pay his dues to the American Institute of Architects. It seems possible that by the mid-1930s, he was resigned to work as a manual laborer.

Cordella died in Minneapolis on April 12, 1937. His funeral was on April 15 at the Basilica of Saint Mary and he was buried in St Mary's cemetery.
