= Church of St. Joseph (Browerville, Minnesota) =

Historic church in Minnesota, United States

- Alternative names: Christ the King Catholic Church
- Church of St. Joseph--Catholic
- U.S. National Register of Historic Places
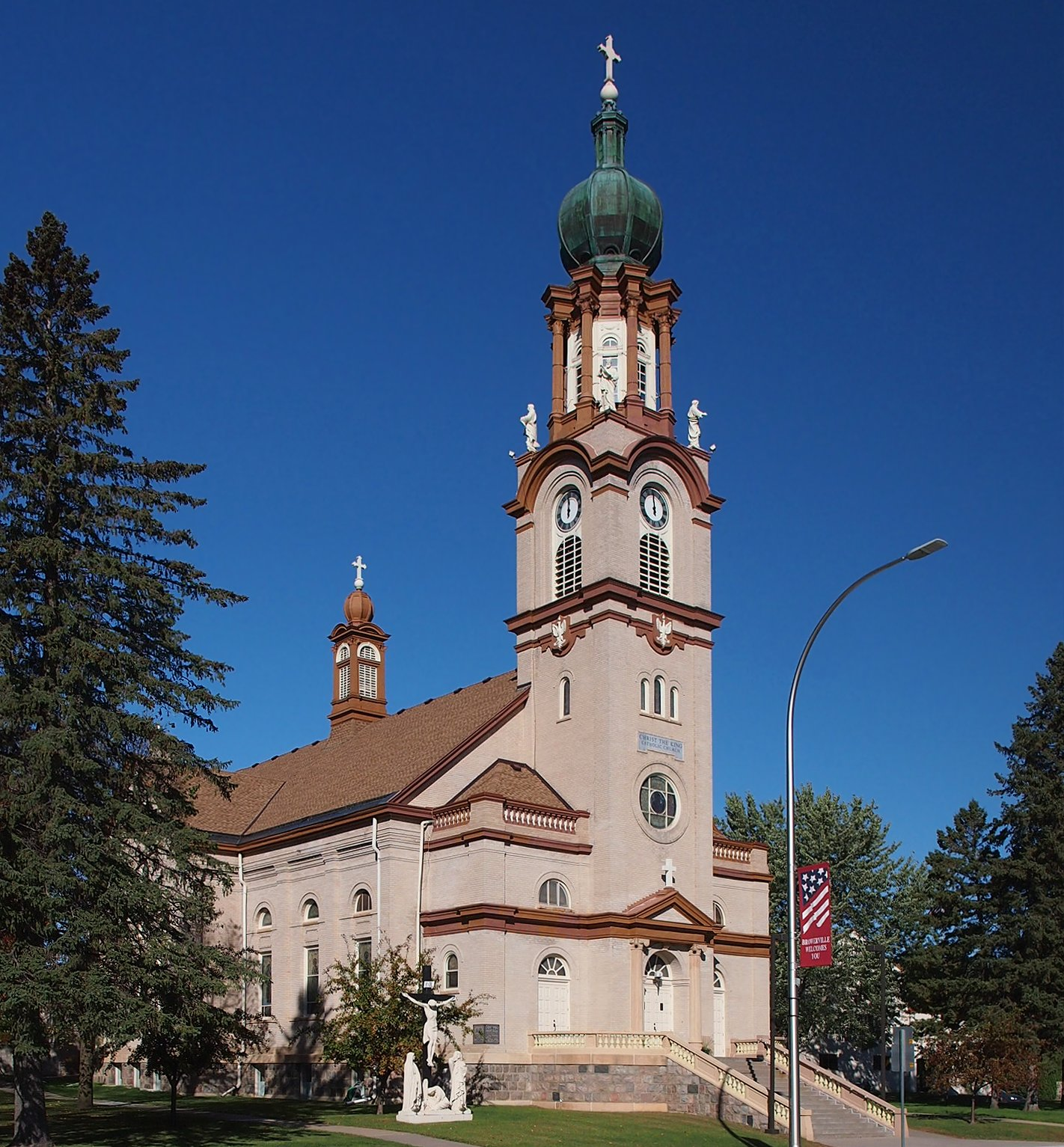
- The Church of St. Joseph from the southeast

- Location within Minnesota Location within the United States
- Location: 720 N. Main Street, Browerville, Minnesota
- Coordinates: 46°5′12″N 94°52′4″W
- Area: 2.25 acres (0.91 ha)
- Built: 1908–09
- Built by: Hirr and Zierton
- Architect: Boehme and Cordella
- Architectural style: Baroque Revival
- NRHP reference No.: 85001996
- Designated: September 5, 1985

The historic Church of St. Joseph (now named Christ the King Catholic Church) is a church in Browerville, Minnesota, United States. It was built from 1908 to 1909 by a community of Polish immigrants that had established itself in the area from 1870 to 1900. The building was listed on the National Register of Historic Places as Church of St. Joseph—Catholic in 1985 for its local significance in the themes of architecture, exploration/settlement, and religion. It was nominated for its unifying central role in an immigrant community.

== Description ==
The exterior has a 70-foot-tall (21 m) tower topped with a drum surrounded by eight columns, with an onion dome and cross on the very top. The tower has an emblem of an eagle, a Polish national symbol. It has a Gethsemane rock grotto designed by award-winning sculptor Joseph Kiselewski, and a Black Madonna, a traditional Polish cultural object.

== History ==
Emigrants from the Silesia region of western Poland began settling in the Browerville area in 1870, increasing in pace after a rail line was built through central Todd County in the early 1880s. An equal number of German immigrants were also settling the area, and the two groups united to establish a Roman Catholic parish in 1884. That year saw the construction of the first Church of St. Joseph, and in 1890 they added a parochial school. However a dispute over the financing of the school broke out between the two nationalities. This culminated in an 1895 split, with the Polish side retaining the original church and school while the Germans left to build their own religious facility at the opposite end of Browerville's Main Street.

The St. Joseph's congregation grew to about 200 families by 1907, straining the capacity of the existing church. The parish decided to construct a new church, with each member contributing toward the estimated $25,000 to $30,000 cost. Victor Cordella, a Polish immigrant who was partner in the Minneapolis-based architectural firm of Boehme and Cordella, was selected to design the new church. St. Joseph's Reverend J.S. Guzdek, who had strong ideas against the boxy churches commonly built at the time, consulted closely with Cordella. Their concept was for a building "lit with a golden light" through amber stained glass windows.

The building contract went to the firm of Hirr and Zierton of St. Cloud, Minnesota. However members of the congregation provided labor to excavate the foundation and also furnished the bricks. The cornerstone was blessed in July 1908 and the church was completed for Easter the following spring.

The parish eventually merged back with the German parish in 1980, after declining membership. The combined parish was named Christ the King.

== See also ==
- List of Catholic churches in the United States
- National Register of Historic Places listings in Todd County, Minnesota
