= Church of St. Casimir (Saint Paul, Minnesota) =

Historic church in Minnesota, United States

- Church of St. Casimir--Catholic
- U.S. National Register of Historic Places
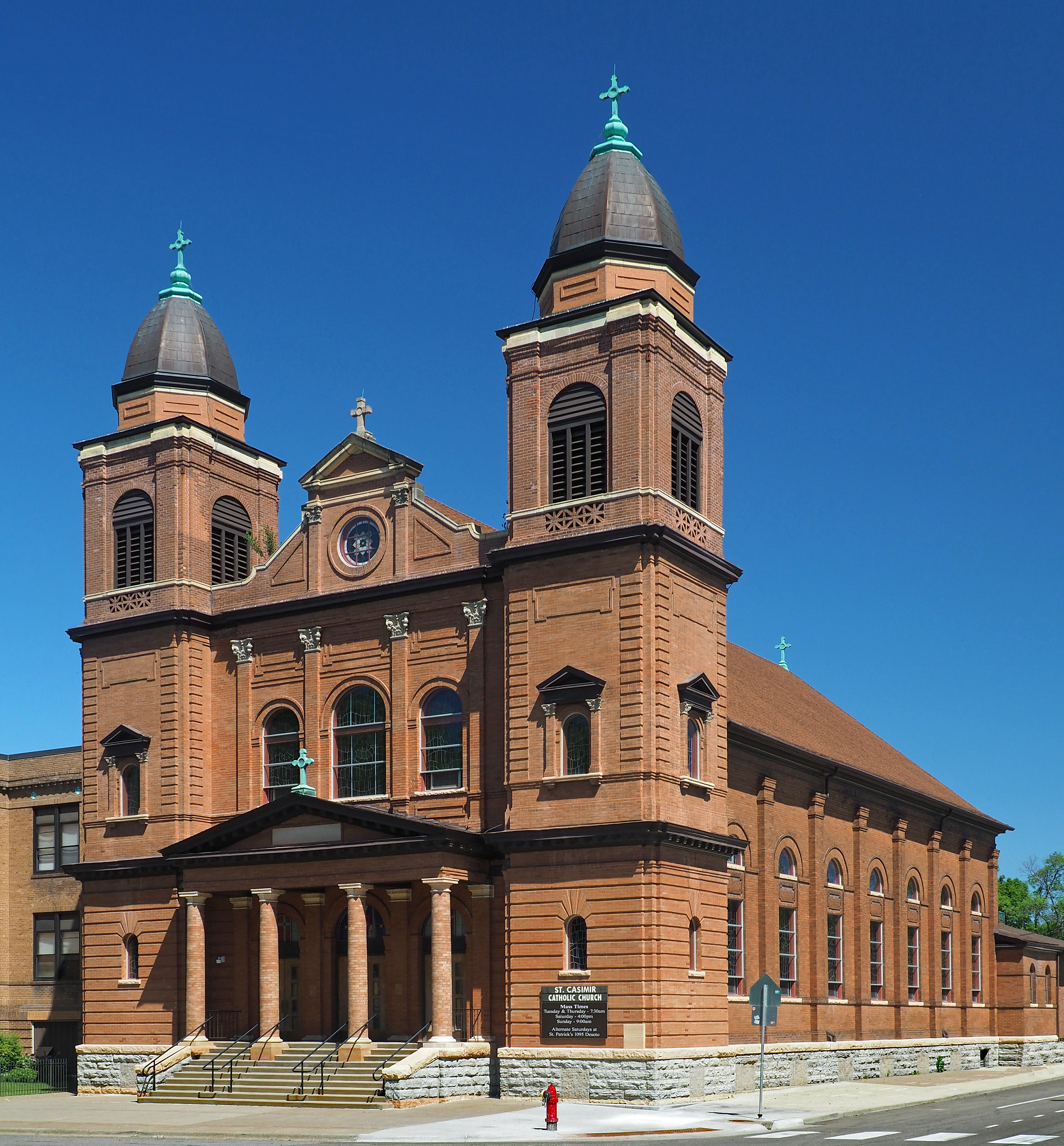
- The Church of St. Casimir from the southeast
- Location: 937 Jessamine Avenue East, Saint Paul, Minnesota
- Coordinates: 44°58′30″N 93°3′40″W
- Built: 1904
- Architect: Victor Cordella
- Architectural style: Beaux-Arts
- NRHP reference No.: 83000939
- Added to NRHP: March 31, 1983

The Church of Saint Casimir is a Catholic church built in 1904 in the Beaux-Arts style in the Payne-Phalen neighborhood of Saint Paul, Minnesota, United States. The church was founded to serve the needs of Polish American immigrants, and is listed on the National Register of Historic Places.

== History ==
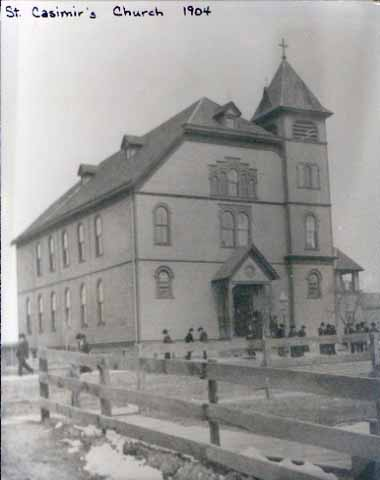
The original 1892 church building

The parish of Saint Casimir dates back to an original combined church and school building erected in 1892 to serve the Polish Catholic immigrant community. The current church building, designed by Polish-American architect Victor Cordella, was constructed in 1904. Constructed in the Beaux-Arts style, the red-pressed brick building was built on a limestone foundation. In 1926, the original onion domes on the double bell towers were replaced by egg-shaped tops. Tuscan columns grace the front. The interior was remodeled in 1956, but remains a good example of Beaux-Arts.

Since 1916, the parish has been served by the Oblates of Mary Immaculate. The current school building was constructed in 1924. Masses using the Polish language were offered until around World War II. In 1992, the school of Saint Casimir was merged with the schools of nearby St. Patrick and Sacred Heart parishes to form Trinity Catholic School. The combined school closed in 2009.

By 1952, five priests and 27 sisters had come from the St. Casimir's. Archbishop Roger Lawrence Schwietz, bishop of Duluth from 1989 to 2000 and archbishop of Anchorage from 2001 to 2016, grew up attending the parish.

The church was added to the National Register of Historic Places in 1983, being significant for its value to the early Polish immigrant community in Minnesota and its atypically sophisticated Beaux-Arts style for a church in St. Paul.
