= Jelmer =

Jelmer is a Dutch given name. Notable people with the given name include:

- Jelmer Beulenkamp (born 1977), Dutch speed skater
- Jelmer Wiersma (fl. 1989), musician

== See also ==
- Hjalmar (given name)
