= St. Mary's Cathedral (Minneapolis) =

St. Mary's Orthodox Cathedral
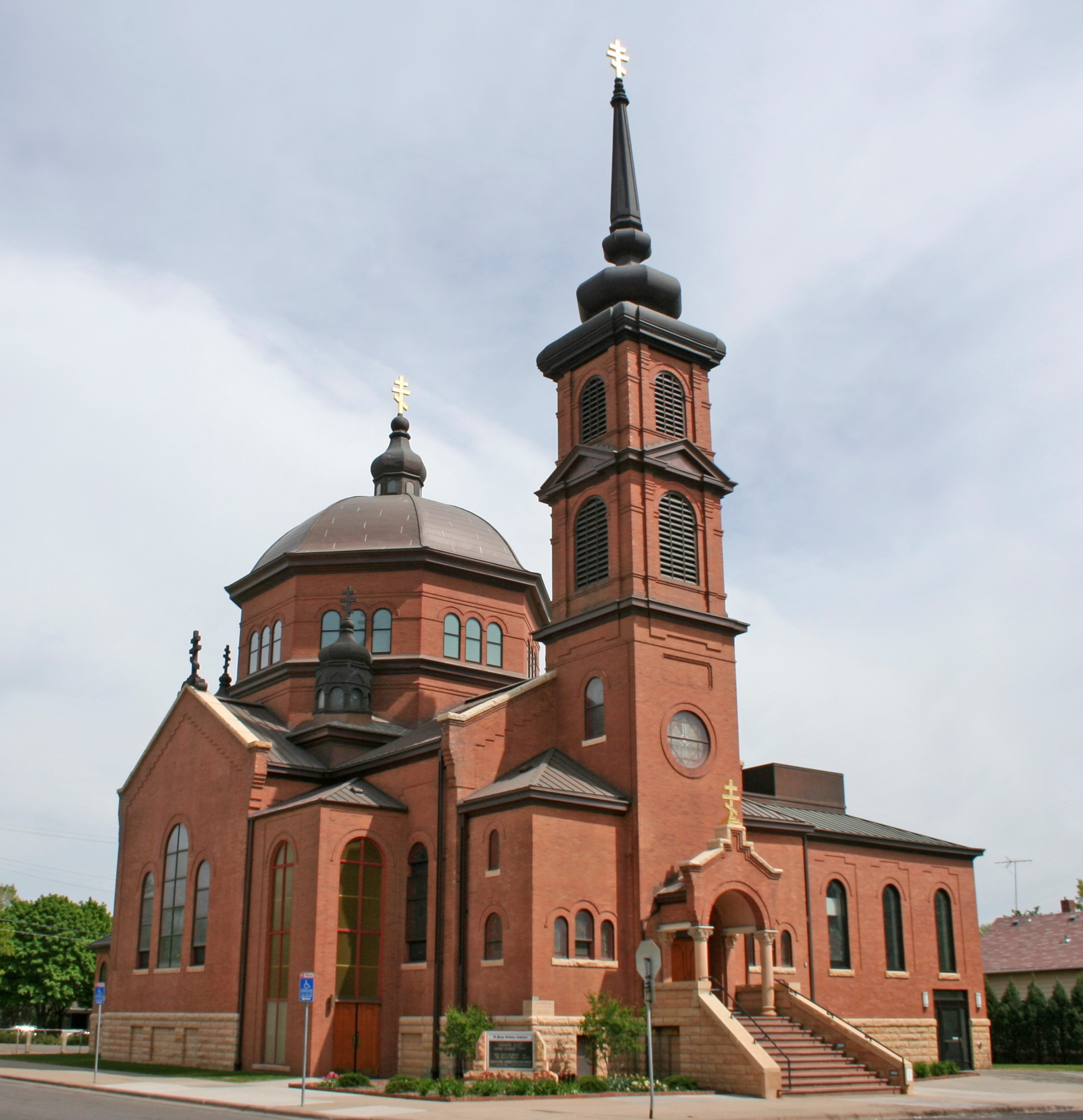
- St. Mary's in Minneapolis, seen from the northwest
- St. Mary's Orthodox Cathedral
- 45°0′18″N 93°15′36″W
- Location: 1701 Fifth Street N.E., Minneapolis, Minnesota
- Country: United States
- Denomination: Orthodox Church in America
- Website: http://www.stmarysoca.org/

History
- Founder: Alexis Toth
- Consecrated: 1906

Architecture
- Architect(s): Boehme and Cordella

Administration
- Diocese: Diocese of the Midwest

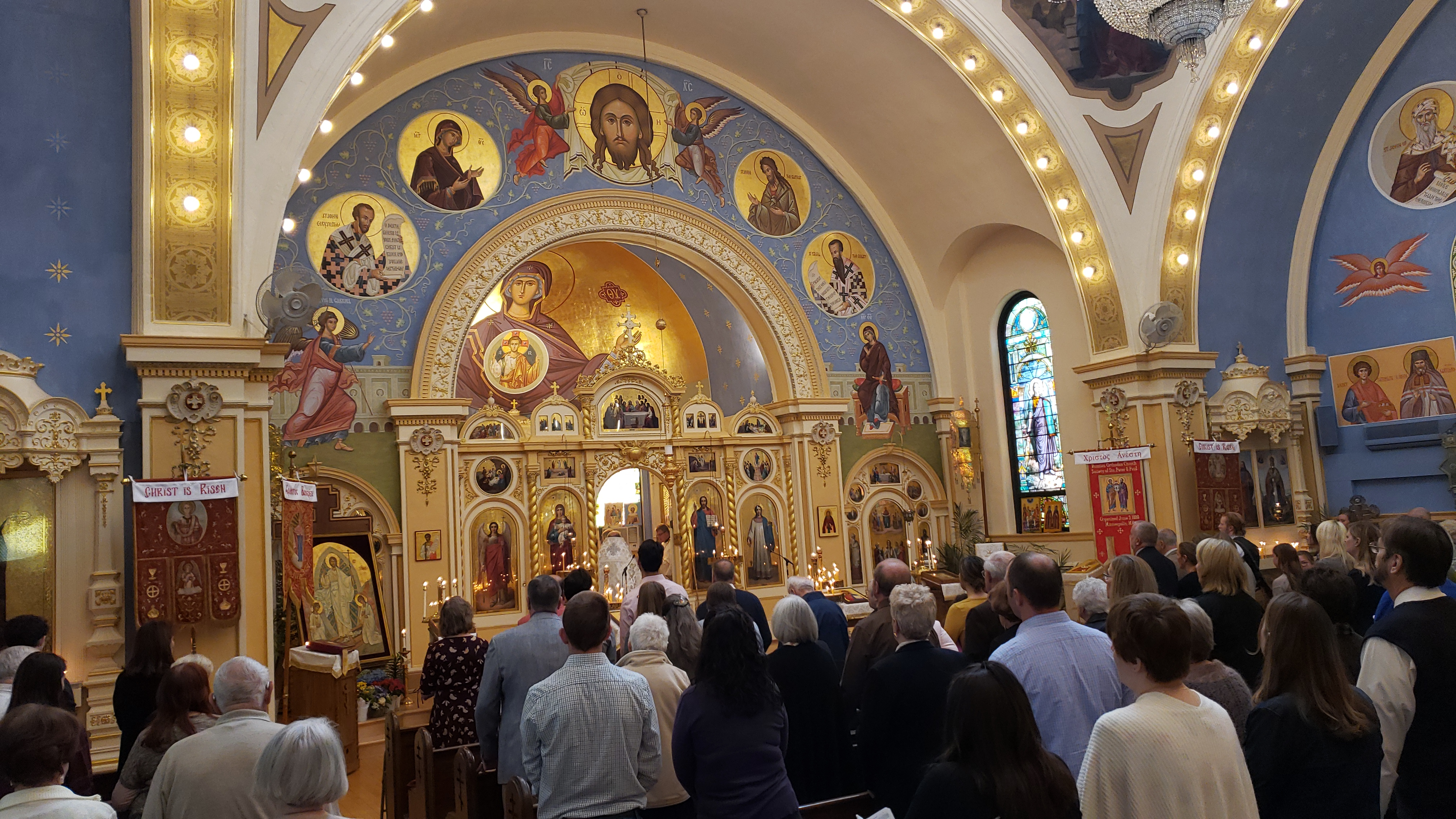
The divine liturgy of St. John Chrysostom is celebrated at the historic St. Mary's Orthodox Cathedral, located in the Northeast Minneapolis Arts District.

St. Mary's Orthodox Cathedral, also known as the Cathedral of the Protection of the Holy Virgin, is a cathedral of the Orthodox Church in America and the Diocese of the Midwest, located in Minneapolis. It is one of only two Orthodox churches in Northeast Minneapolis, and of 16 local Orthodox churches in the Twin Cities. The cathedral is dedicated to the feast of the Protection of the Virgin Mary, celebrated annually on October 1.

The parish community has been at its present location since 1887 when faithful immigrants primarily from Slovakia, Carpatho-Rus, and Ukraine built their first church of wood. The present congregation includes third and fourth generation descendants of the original founders, along with men and women from across the greater Twin Cities region from all nationalities and backgrounds. Through the years, many of today's parishioners have converted to Orthodox Christianity, reflecting the diversity of Orthodoxy and residents of Minnesota.

In 1904, the structure burned to the ground, and members decided to build the larger steel and stone structure in continuous use to the present day. Designed in the popular Russian Baroque style of the period by local Twin Cities architect Victor Cordella the design reflects the Dormition Orthodox Cathedral in Omsk, Russia, a popular style in the early 20th century for Russian churches. The present cathedral in Minneapolis was consecrated in 1906 by Patriarch Tikhon of Moscow. Monks from the Trinity-St. Sergius Monastery outside of Moscow installed the hand-painted iconography and carved iconostasis. St. Tikhon was later elected Patriarch of Moscow (d. 1925) and glorified as a New-Martyr, a missionary builder of the Orthodox Church in North America.

Now in its second century, the Cathedral structure recently underwent comprehensive exterior restoration efforts to ensure its stability and usability for future generations. The first phase of new interior icons were installed in 2012 and the second phase was completed in 2015. It is hoped that additional icons will be added in the coming years, further enriching the vibrant liturgical life for those who call St. Mary’s home.

The first officiating priest at the future cathedral was Saint Alexis Toth, who was canonized in 1994. He was at St Mary's from 1889 to 1893. He came into conflict with the local Roman Catholic bishop, John Ireland, who disapproved of a widower becoming a priest, but succeeded in establishing the congregation within what would become the Orthodox Church in America Diocese of the Midwest. The original wooden church burned down in 1904; by the time it was replaced, the congregation was around 900.
