= American Swedish Institute =

Swedish-American institute in Minneapolis, Minnesota, US

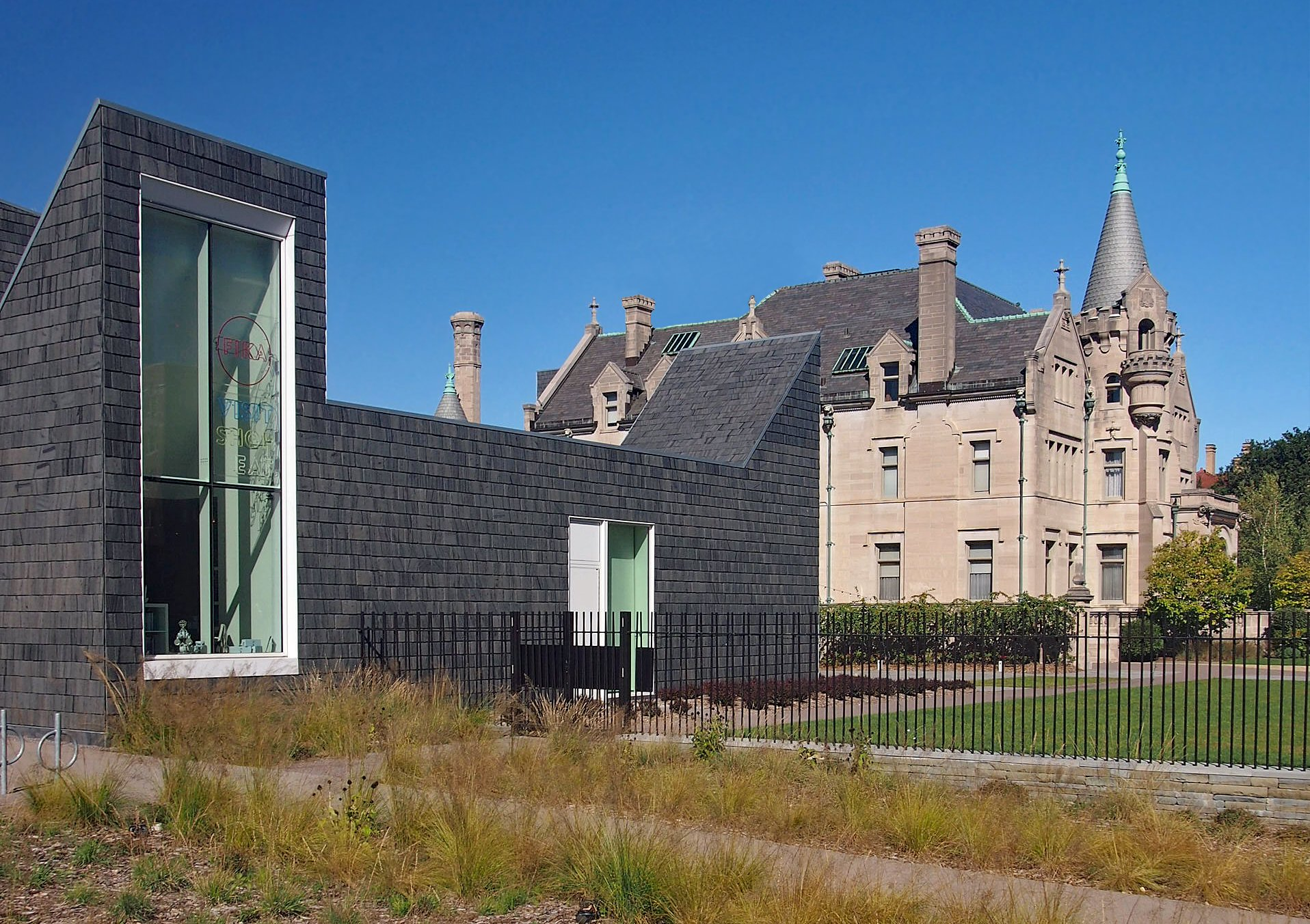
- The main buildings of the American Swedish Institute

- Location within Minnesota Location within the United States
- Former name: American Institute for Swedish Arts, Literature and Science
- Established: 1929
- Location: 2600 Park Avenue, Minneapolis, Minnesota
- Coordinates: 44°57′18″N 93°15′57″W
- Website: asimn.org
- Swan Turnblad House
- U.S. National Register of Historic Places
- Minneapolis Landmark
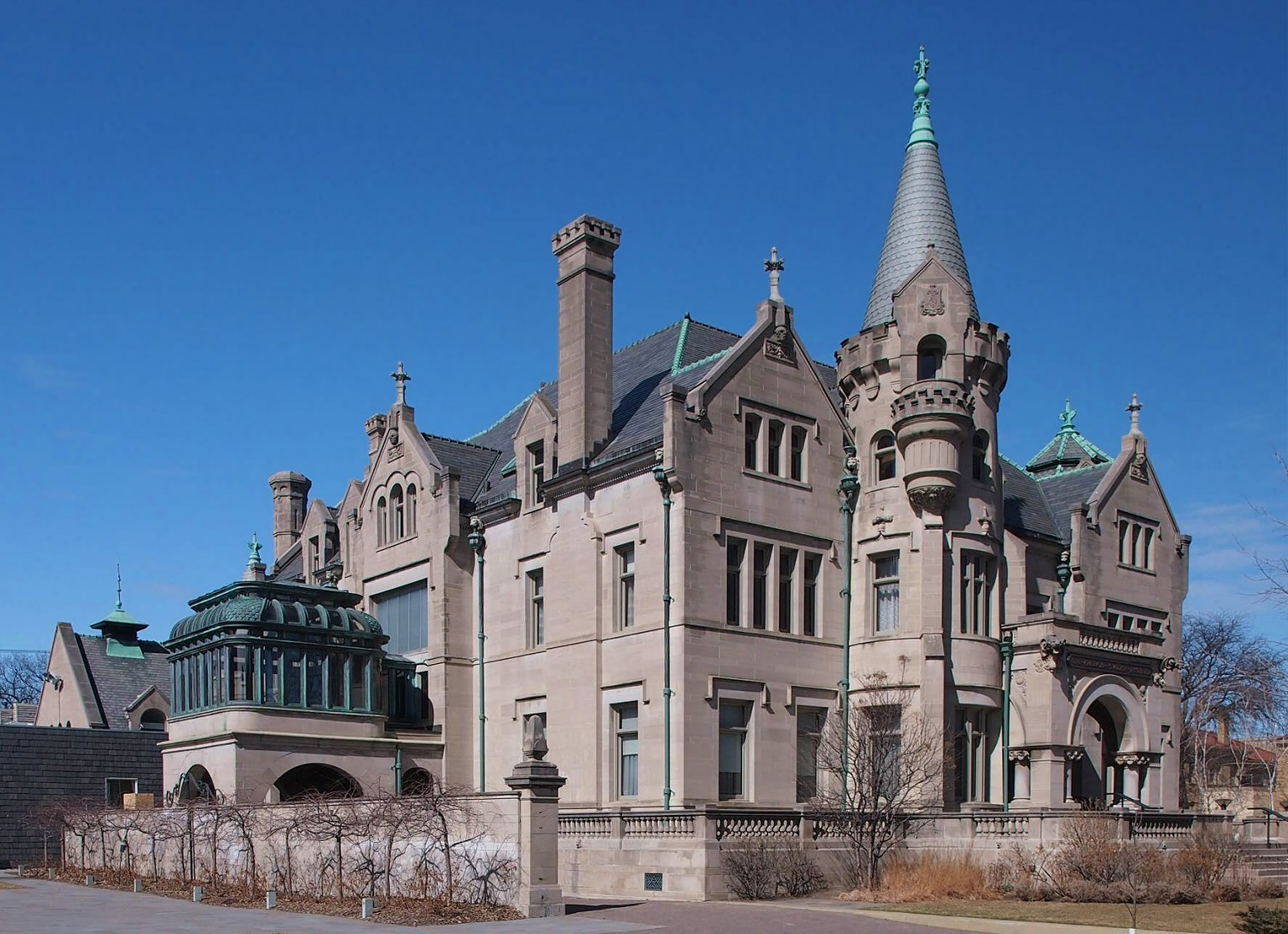
- The Swan Turnblad House viewed from the southeast
- Coordinates: 44°57′18.7″N 93°15′57″W
- Area: Less than one acre
- Built: 1903–10
- Architect: Boehme & Cordella
- Architectural style: Châteauesque
- NRHP reference No.: 71000436

Significant dates
- Added to NRHP: August 26, 1971
- Designated MPLSL: 1974

The American Swedish Institute (ASI) is a museum and cultural center in the Phillips West neighborhood of Minneapolis, Minnesota, United States. The organization is dedicated to the preservation and study of the historic role Sweden and Swedish Americans have played in US culture and history. The museum complex includes the Swan Turnblad Mansion, completed in 1908, and the adjoining Nelson Cultural Center, completed in 2012.

It has EIN 41-0711603 as a 501(c)(3) Public Charity; in 2023, it reported total revenue of $6,637,892 and total assets of $60,326,225.

Today, ASI serves as a gathering place for all people to share experiences around themes of culture, migration, the environment and the arts, informed by enduring links to Sweden. The museum offers exhibitions from Sweden and the Nordic region, programming for youth and family, and in recent years, has expanded its performing arts offerings. The museum's restaurant, FIKA, was named "Best Lunch In Minnesota" by the Star Tribune in 2013 for its New Nordic cuisine.

== History ==
The American Swedish Institute is housed in a turn-of-the-20th-century mansion that was built for Swedish immigrants Swan and Christina Turnblad. Swan Turnblad immigrated with his family to the United States in 1868 at the age of eight. His parents made the decision to leave their farm in the famine-ridden area of Småland, Sweden. The family settled in a Swedish community called Vasa in southern Minnesota where they joined relatives who had settled in the area earlier.

Swan Turnblad was not content to continue in the family farming tradition. In 1879, Turnblad left Vasa for Minneapolis where he lived the quintessential rags-to-riches American success story. After he moved to Minneapolis, Turnblad worked at several Swedish language newspapers as a typesetter. His interest in the printing industry eventually led to his success as publisher of the Swedish language newspaper Svenska Amerikanska Posten. Within ten years he was the sole owner. Under his management, circulation of the weekly paper soared to over 40,000, a substantial increase from the 1,400 it initially claimed. This publication was likely the principal source of Turnblad's wealth.

The success of the paper was a result of Turnblad's aggressive management style, as well as the large numbers of Swedish immigrants who supported it. He created a technically advanced newspaper by using the best printing equipment available. He was the first Swedish publisher in America to set his paper by Linotype machine. In 1903, Svenska Amerikanska Posten became the first Swedish language paper to use a duplex rotary color printing press, enabling the creation of color illustrations.

In Minneapolis, Swan met and married Christina Nilsson. She, like Turnblad, had come to America from Sweden with her family. Her family settled in Worthington, Minnesota, in 1876 when Christina was 15. Her first job in America paid no wages, but gave her work experience and English language training. Later she worked as a waitress for one year. In 1882, Christina moved to Minneapolis where she met the young newspaperman at a Good Templar meeting. They were married in 1883 and their only child, Lillian Zenobia, was born a year later.

In the early 20th century, the Turnblads started to plan the building of their palatial estate. Their many trips to Europe certainly influenced their decision on the stately chateau style of the mansion and the ornate designs of the interior. The property on Park Avenue was purchased in 1903 and plans were drawn up by the Minneapolis architectural firm of Christopher A. Boehme and Victor Cordella. The structure took nearly five years to build. The Turnblads did not take out a mortgage on this property during construction. Bills were paid as they came due and there are no records of construction costs. When the museum was founded in 1929, the Minneapolis Tribune reported, "the cost is believed to have been close to $1 million although this is a matter the builder does not discuss."

The transition from private residence to museum happened in 1929 when the family donated the house and the newspaper to establish the American Institute for Swedish Arts, Literature and Science (later changed to the American Swedish Institute). Turnblad stated that he had long planned for the home to be a Swedish-American institute. He was quoted as saying, "many persons may have wondered what a small family like ours, a family which had not great social ambitions, wanted with so big a house. Perhaps they can guess now." The mansion is on the National Register of Historic Places. It was listed for its local significance in architecture, art, and education.

The second floor of the mansion underwent restoration in 1995 to rebuild damaged plaster moldings, and restore their gold leaf and paint to match undamaged sections. The work received a Heritage Preservation Award.

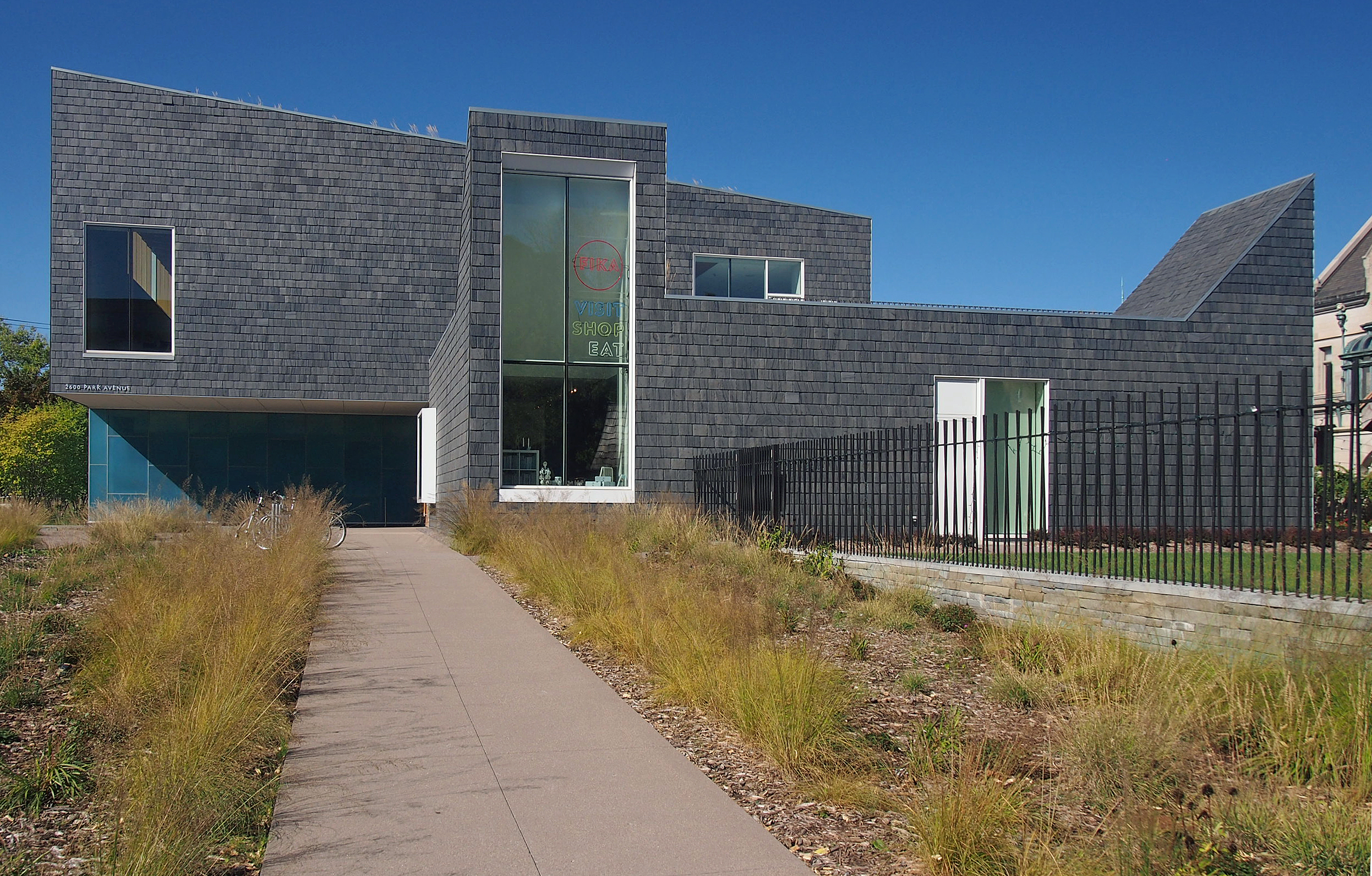
The Nelson Cultural Center

In 2012, ASI opened a 34,000-square-foot (3,200 m^{2}) addition designed by HGA Architects of Minneapolis. The addition includes new gallery space, craft workshop, glass-enclosed reception area, gift shop, restaurant (FIKA), and spaces for events such as concerts, lectures, and community gatherings. The addition was dedicated by King Carl XVI Gustaf and Queen Silvia of Sweden.

== Exhibits at ASI ==
Exhibits at ASI have included:

- The Watercolor Worlds of Lars Lerin – Lars Lerin is a contemporary Nordic artist whose work is described as "both impressionistic and highly detailed".
- Nordic: A Photographic Essay of Landscapes, Food and People – photography from the Michelin Star-winning chef, Magnus Nilsson.
- Eight Seasons in Sápmi, the Land of the Sámi People – the art and culture of the Sami people from the northernmost regions of Sweden, Norway, Finland, and Russia.
- Papercut! The Incredible Psaligraphy of Karen Bit Vejle – an exhibit of 54 paper creations.
- Nobel Creations – Couture designs from students of Beckmans College of Design, on loan from the Nobel Museum in Stockholm, Sweden.

=== Annual Christmas exhibit ===
In the 1950s, ASI began displays that showed how Christmas is celebrated in different Scandinavian countries. This has evolved into an annual display where each room in the mansion is decorated to represent a different country: Sweden, Norway, Finland, Iceland, and Denmark. Recently, the museum has added a "guest country" to the display with a Navidad room from Mexico in 2014 and a Russian Christmas room in 2015.

== See also ==
- National Register of Historic Places listings in Hennepin County, Minnesota
- Swedish Institute

== Other sources ==
- Gump, Gertrude (1976). The Story of Swan Johan Turnblad. Minneapolis, MN: American Swedish Institute. OCLC 26325897.
- Lewis, Anne Gillespie (1999). Turnblad's Castle. The American Swedish Institute. ISBN 9780967439907.
- Anderson, Philip J.; Blanck, Dag, eds. (2001). Swedes in the Twin Cities: Immigrant Life and Minnesota's Urban Frontier. Minnesota Historical Society Press. ISBN 9780873513999.
