= Lew Drill =

American baseball player (1877–1969)

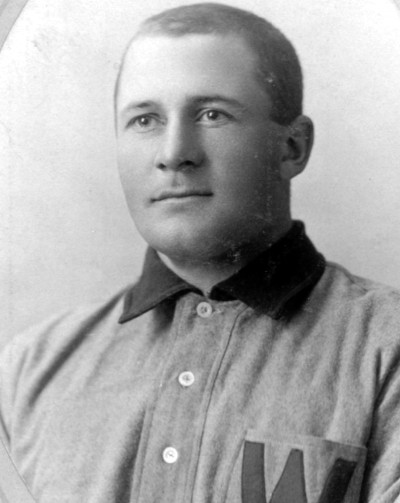
- Catcher
- Born: May 9, 1877; Browerville, Minnesota, U.S.
- Died: July 4, 1969 (aged 92); St. Paul, Minnesota, U.S.
- Batted: Right Threw: Right

MLB debut
- April 23, 1902, for the Washington Senators

Last MLB appearance
- October 3, 1905, for the Detroit Tigers

MLB statistics
- Batting average: .258
- Home runs: 2
- Runs batted in: 100
- Stats at Baseball Reference

Teams
- Baltimore Orioles (1902); Washington Senators (1902–1904); Detroit Tigers (1904–1905)

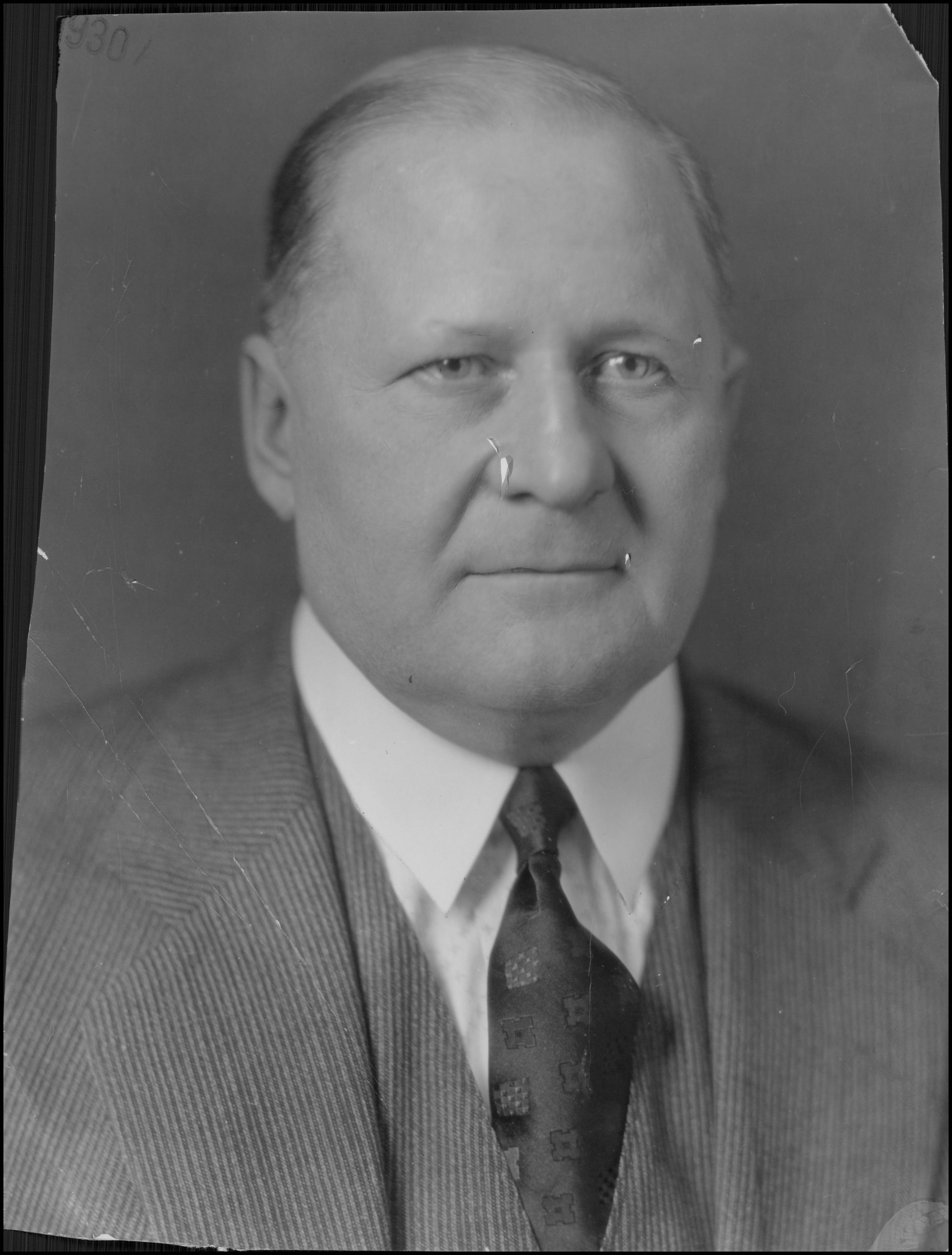
Drill as United States Attorney for the District of Minnesota

Lewis L. Drill (May 9, 1877 – July 4, 1969) was an American baseball player, baseball manager, and lawyer. He played professional baseball as a catcher for eight years from 1902 to 1909, including four years in Major League Baseball with the Washington Senators (1902–1904), Baltimore Orioles (1902) and Detroit Tigers (1904–1905). In 293 major league games, Drill compiled a .258 batting average and a .353 on-base percentage. He also served as the manager of the Terre Haute Hottentots in 1908. He later served as the United States Attorney for Minnesota from 1929 to 1931.

== Early years ==
Drill was born in Browerville, Minnesota, in 1877. He attended Georgetown University in Washington, D.C., and Hamline University in St. Paul, Minnesota. He was the catcher for the Georgetown baseball team.

== Professional baseball ==
Drill began his professional baseball career in 1902 as a catcher for the Washington Senators and Baltimore Orioles. He compiled a .262 batting average in 73 games during the 1902 season. He returned to the Senators in 1903 and 1904.

Drill joined the Detroit Tigers in July 1904. During the 1904 and 1905 seasons, he appeared in 123 games for the Tigers and compiled a .253 batting average and a .353 on-base percentage. According to a letter in the Detroit Tiger records in the Detroit public library Frank Navin, secretary and future owner of the Detroit Tigers, offered him a contract for the 1906 season. Drill, who was making more money as a lawyer turned down the offer.

In 293 major league games, Drill had a .258 batting average and .353 on-base percentage. His .359 on-base percentage in 1904 was the sixth highest in the American League.

Although his major league career ended in 1905, he continued playing in the minor leagues for another four years with the St. Paul Saints (1906), Pueblo Indians (1907), Terre Haute Hottentots (1908), and Superior Blues (1909). He also served as the manager of Terre Haute in 1908 and then for the Monmouth Browns (Illinois-Missouri League) in 1910.

== Later years ==
Drill was a lawyer. Even during his playing career, he was a member of the Drill, Downing and Drill Law Collectors firm in St. Paul, Minnesota, attending to business during the winter months. He later became district attorney from 1929 to 1931 and the United States Attorney for Minnesota. He died in 1969 in St. Paul at age 92.
