= Djalma =

Djalma is a Portuguese given name, may refer to:

- Djalma (footballer, 1918-1954), Djalma Bezerra dos Santos, Brazilian football forward
- Djalma Santos (1929–2013), Brazilian footballer
- Djalma Freitas (1938–2012), Brazilian footballer
- Djalma Dias (1939–1990), Brazilian footballer, full name Djalma Pereira Dias Júnior
    - Djalminha (born 1970), Brazilian footballer, son of Djalma Dias, full name Djalma Feitosa Dias
- Djalma Henrique da Silva, (born 1975), Brazilian footballer
- Djalma Santos Rodrigues Júnior, known as Djalma Santos (born 1976), Brazilian footballer
- Djalma Braume Manuel Abel Campos (born 1987), Angolan footballer

== See also ==
- Djalmir
- Hjalmar - Scandinavian variation
