= Per Helmer =

Norwegian businessperson (1897–1966)

Per Helmer (16 July 1897 – 9 June 1966) was a Norwegian businessperson.

He was born in Kristiania, as a son of barrister Jan Groos Helmer and Minna, née Heiberg. In January 1922 he married Rikke Krag (1900–1947), a daughter of wholesaler Hans Peter Fyhn Krag. This marriage produced two children, Rikke and Jan Groos, but was dissolved in 1940. In 1945 he married violinist Sigrid Due-Tønnessen, with whom he also had two children Siri and Anne.

Helmer finished his secondary education at Aars og Voss in 1916 and studied timber and trade in Sweden, Finland and England. He was employed in his father-in-law's company Krag & Co. from 1922 to 1929, when he became chief executive officer of Wilhelm Jordan. This industrial company had been founded in 1837, and took up toothbrush manufacturing in 1927, developing into an internationally recognized brand.

Helmer was a board member of Krag Maskin Fabrik from 1926, Wilhelm Jordan from 1929, Krag & Co. from 1931, Essvik from 1934, Granvik from 1934, and supervisory council member of Forsikringsselskapet Poseidon from 1930.
