= Helmer Jõgi =

Estonian politician (born 1952)

Helmer Jõgi (born 12 January 1952) is an Estonian politician. He was a member of X and XI Riigikogu.

Jõgi was born in Tartu and graduated from Tartu State University in 1975 with a degree in mathematics.
