= Joseph Kiselewski =

Polish-American sculptor 1901–1988

Joseph A. Kiselewski (February 16, 1901 – February 26, 1988) was a sculptor. He was born near Browerville, Minnesota, trained in Minneapolis, New York, Paris, and Rome, and had a New York City studio from 1929 to 1980. He continued to work in his Browerville studio until his death.

== Biography ==
Kiselewski was born to Polish immigrant farmers in Ward township just north of Browerville, Minnesota. Polish was his first language and he was the fourth of nine children. Young Joseph attended a one-room public country school, then a Polish school, and later graduated from the Minneapolis School of Art. A number of teachers and mentors, including Kiselewski's parish priest Fr. John Gudzeck, encouraged him to attend art school. Although his father discouraged him, Kiselewski moved to New York City, where he studied at the National Academy of Design and at the Beaux-Arts Institute of Design. From 1922 to 1926 he worked as an assistant to sculptor Lee Lawrie.

While employed in the studio of sculptor Lee Lawrie, Kiselewski won the Parisian Beaux Arts competition in 1925; received the Prix de Rome in 1926–1929, established a studio in New York in 1929, and was elected an Associate of the National Academy of Design, New York City, in 1936, and an Academician in 1944. He received the J. Sanford Saltus Medal in 1970 for excellence in the art of medallic sculpture. He designed numerous medals including some for the US Air Force and the US Army (including the Army Good Conduct Medal) in his lifetime, in addition to the American Defense Service Medal.

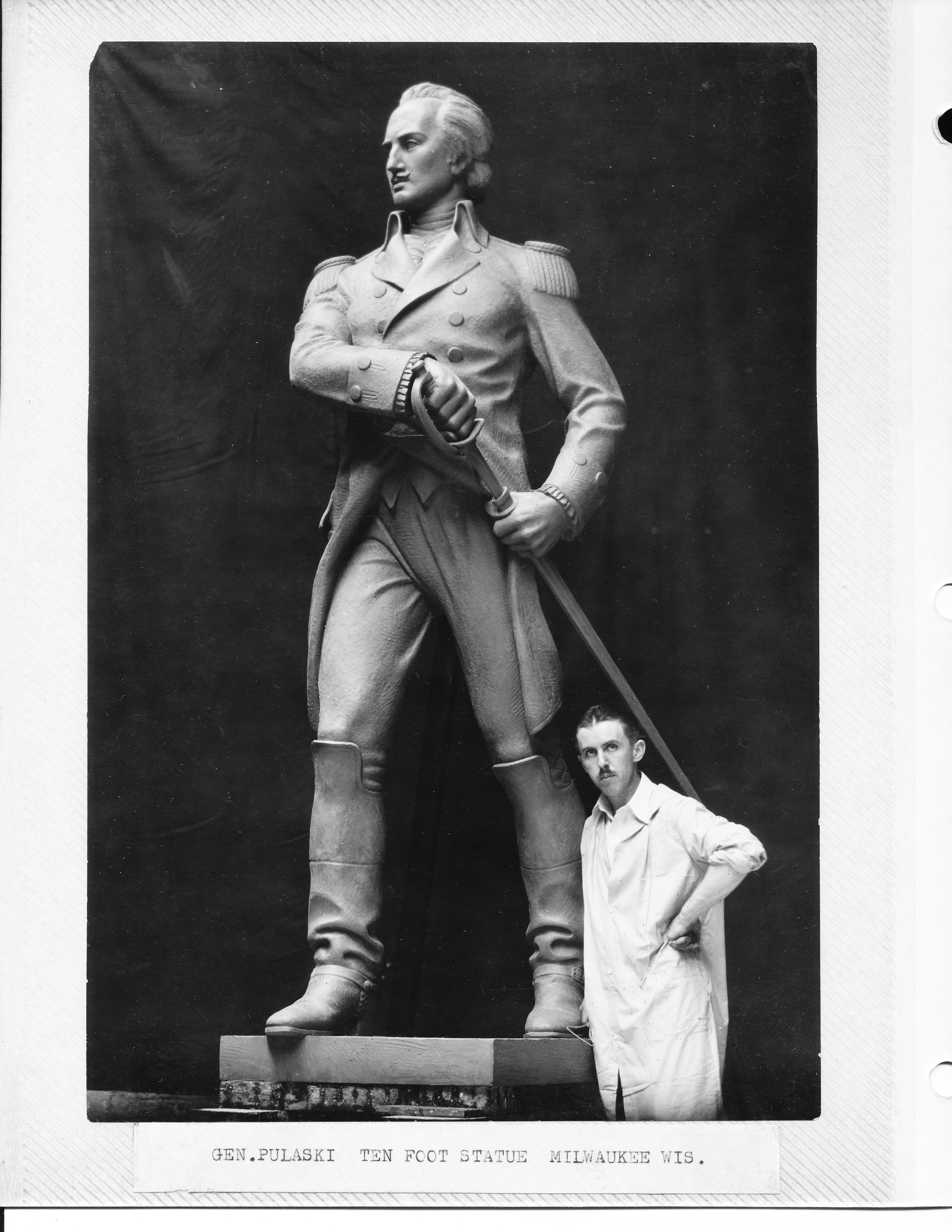
Joseph Kiselewski with his 1931 sculpture of American Revolutionary War General Kasimir Pulaski.

Four sculptures by Kiselewski are in the public art collection of the Bronx, in New York City. They include his involvement, in 1932, with several other art deco era sculptors in the creation of Eight Statuary Groups, each 100" x 121" x 70", sculpted from Georgia pink marble, sited at the Bronx County Courthouse, 161st Street & Grand Concourse. Kiselewski's three-feet high granite Frogs, are located at P.S. 18 and Patterson Houses, on Morris Avenue, between 145th and 146th Streets. His bronze bust of Sylvanus Thayer, 1966, is in the Hall of Fame for Great Americans, Bronx Community College/CUNY, on University Avenue and West 181st Street, as is his bronze bust of Oliver Wendell Holmes Jr., 1970.

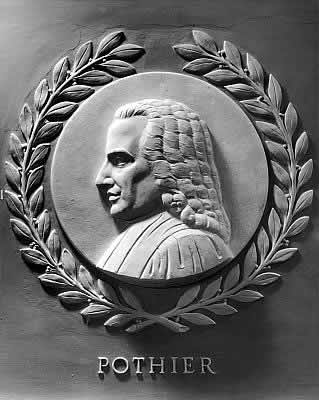
Robert Joseph Pothier, one of four marble reliefs sculpted by Kiselewski in 1950 and installed in the U.S. House of Representatives.

For the Netherlands American Cemetery in Margraten Kiselewski designed "Peace" or the "Mourning Woman" of a mother remembering her son. Kiselewski designed a statue of Harold Stirling Vanderbilt, which is located on the campus of Vanderbilt University in Nashville, Tennessee.

In 1977 and 1980, Kiselewski donated his papers, covering the period, 1923–1980, to the Archives of American Art, Smithsonian Institution, Washington, D.C. Included in the papers were biographical material; award and teaching certificates; files on sculpture commissions containing contracts, correspondence, financial records, sketches, printed material, notes and photographs; approximately three hundred photographs of the sculptor, his studio, and his work; 2 pencil drawings; and other items.

George Gurney, a Washington, D.C. curator and art historian interviewed twenty-one sculptors in 1977–1978, one of which was Joseph Kiselewski, for an exhibition, "Sculpture and the Federal Triangle," held at the National Museum of American Art, October 26, 1979 through January 6, 1980. While Gurney conducted most of the interviews on tape, there is only a questionnaire answered by Kiselewski, which is part of the Gurney material, also on file in the Archives of American Art, Smithsonian Institution, Washington, D.C.

Kiselewski designed this medal, among many others.

In 1980 Kiselewski retired to Browerville Minnesota, his birthplace. He opened a studio and created several busts including one of his boyhood parish priest, Fr. Gudzek. Gudzek. The Gudzek bust, along with a collection of photographs, busts, and small sculptures, are on display at the American Heritage Bank Browerville. Two of his large statuary sculptures are located in front of the Catholic church in Browerville. On March 26, 1987, Minnesota Governor Rudy Perpich visited Browerville and declared the day officially "Joe Kiselewski Day".

== See also ==
- List of Saltus Award winners
