= Mount Helmer =

Mountain in British Columbia, Canada

- Location within Alberta Location within British Columbia Location within Canada

Highest point
- Elevation: 3,030 m (9,940 ft)
- Prominence: 188 m (617 ft)
- Listing: Mountains of Alberta; Mountains of British Columbia
- Coordinates: 51°42′18″N 116°50′21″W

Geography
- Country: Canada
- Provinces: Alberta and British Columbia
- Protected area: Banff National Park
- Parent range: Park Ranges
- Topo map: NTS 82N10 Blaeberry River

Climbing
- First ascent: 1949 J. Bishop, D. Greenwell, E.R. LaChapelle, D.M. Woods

Mount Helmer is located on the border of Alberta and British Columbia, East of Waitabit Creek and North of Golden. It was named in 1924 after Brigadier-General Richard Alexis Helmer (1864-1920) and his son Alexis Helmer (1892-1915) were killed in battle and was part of the inspiration for In Flanders Fields through his friendship with John McCrae. It is the 194th highest mountain in Alberta and the 355th highest mountain in Canada.

== See also ==
- List of peaks on the British Columbia–Alberta border
