= John Helmer =

John Helmer may refer to:

- John Helmer (musician) (born 1956), British musician and writer
- John Helmer (footballer) (1938–1982), Australian rules footballer for Geelong
- John Helmer (journalist) (born 1946), Moscow based blogger and journalist
- John L. Helmer, American bobsledder
