= K. H. Gustavson =

Swedish chemist (1896–1973)

Karl Helmer Gustavson (Note: also spelled Gustafsson) (21 June 1896 – 11 February 1973) was a Swedish chemist. Gustavson was head of Swedish Tanning Research Institute (Garverinäringens forskningsinstitut) 1948–1966 and became professor in 1956. He is considered one of the founders of the modern leather chemistry, above all through his works on chromium tanning.

== Education ==
Gustavson was born in Lerbäck, Örebro County, Sweden. He studied at KTH Royal Institute of Technology and in Boston, Massachusetts, 1917–23.

He was a research chemist and technical director at the Leather Industries of America 1921–1933, and chief chemist at C J Lundbergs läderfabriks AB, Valdemarsvik 1934–1948. In 1943, he became member of Royal Swedish Academy of Engineering Sciences (IVA) and in 1956 member of the Royal Swedish Academy of Sciences; in 1949 awarded honorary doctor at KTH. Gustavson received in 1955 IVA's Great Gold Medal for "his works on the colloidal chemistry of the leather proteins".

During 1926–1930 Gustavson was section secretary and section president of the American Chemical Society, president of International Union of Leather Technologists and Chemists Society (IULTCS) 1952–55, honorary member of the Royal Society of Chemistry and a number of other international leather chemistry associations. He has written works on colloidal chemistry of fibre proteins, particularly regarding the chromium tanning chemistry. He has also collaborated in Swedish and international encyclopaedias and handbooks and has also been the author of monographs like The Chemistry and Reactivity of Collagen, 1955, and The Chemistry of Tanning Processes, 1956.

Gustavson died in Spånga, Stockholm. He was the father of the runologist Helmer Olof Gustavson.
