= Browerville, Minnesota =

City in Minnesota, United States

Browerville
- City
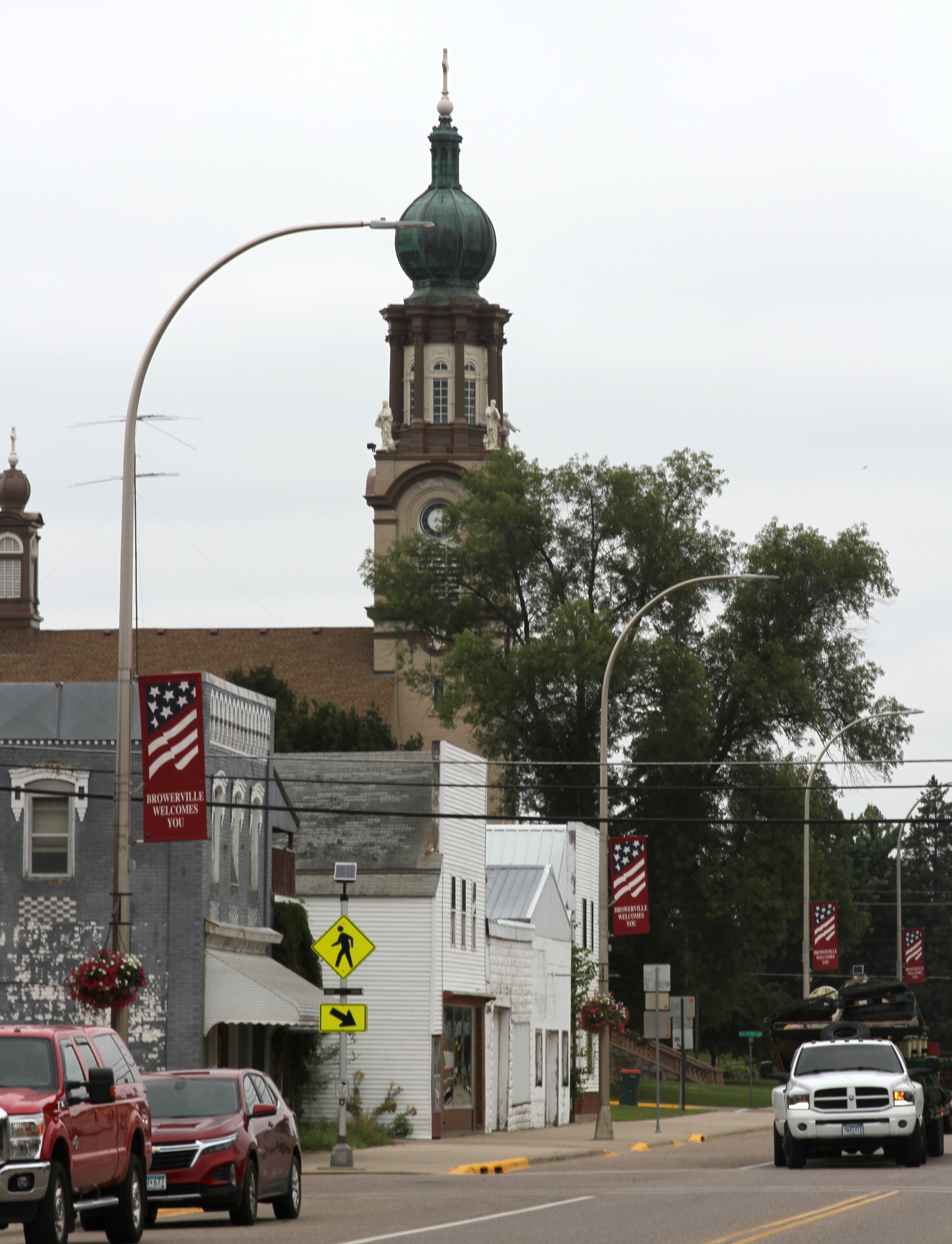
- Main Street looking towards Christ the King Catholic Church

- Location of Browerville, Minnesota
- Coordinates: 46°05′05″N 94°52′06″W
- Country: United States
- State: Minnesota
- County: Todd

Area
  - Total: 1.09 sq mi (2.82 km^{2})
  - Land: 1.09 sq mi (2.82 km^{2})
  - Water: 0 sq mi (0.00 km^{2})
- Elevation: 1,270 ft (390 m)

Population (2020)
  - Total: 839
  - Density: 771/sq mi (297.5/km^{2})
- Time zone: UTC-6 (Central (CST))
  - Summer (DST): UTC-5 (CDT)
- ZIP code: 56438
- Area code: 320
- FIPS code: 27-08110
- GNIS feature ID: 2393436
- Website: http://www.browerville.govoffice.com/

Browerville is a city in Todd County, Minnesota. The population was 790 at the time of the 2010 census. By the 2020 Decennial Census the population had increased to 839.

== History ==
Browerville was platted in 1882, and named after Jacob V. Brower (1844–1905), a noted conservationist, father of both Itasca State Park and the Minnesota State Park system, and former Todd County official. Browerville was incorporated in 1884. Two properties in town are on the National Register of Historic Places: the Kahlert Mercantile Store, built in 1883, and the Church of St. Joseph, completed in 1909.

Despite being a largely Irish-, German- and Polish-American area of the State, a Rusyn farming community was also formed during the early 20th century in Browerville, by recent immigrants who had migrated West from the industrial cities in Pennsylvania. The building of a Byzantine Catholic parish church was preceded by the founding of a chapter of the Greek Catholic Union of the USA.

In a 21 August 1912 open letter to the Amerikansky Russky Viestnik, the parishioners of Holy Trinity Greek Catholic Church in Browerville, known locally as "The Farmer's Church" and which was being served by visiting priests from St John the Baptist Byzantine Catholic Church in Minneapolis, announced that they had recently refused to surrender the parish and cemetery deeds to Pope Pius X's newly appointed Greek Catholic Bishop of the United States, Kyr Soter Ortynsky. This was because the Byzantine Rite farmers of Browerville were Rusyns from Transcarpathia and members of the Ruthenian Greek Catholic Church, and they accordingly viewed Bishop Soter, a member of the Ukrainian Greek Catholic Church from the Kingdom of Galicia and Lodomeria, as a foreigner. They intended instead to wait for a Rusyn Bishop to also be assigned in North America before surrendering the deed.

A regular pastor was never assigned, however. Tensions rose further in 1926, when the family of Michael Dorosh, inspired by Russophilia, converted to the Russian Orthodox Church and joined St. Mary's Russian Orthodox Church in Holdingford, Minnesota. For a time, the Russian Orthodox priest from Holdingford would visit Browerville, which led to both Orthodox and Greek Catholics using Holy Trinity Church at different times. Most parishioners of Holy Trinity Church, however, eventually switched to the Roman Rite and mainly joined St. Peter's Church, locally known as "the German church", instead of converting to Orthodoxy.

The last attempted use of the Church was for a Greek Catholic Funeral Liturgy, or Panikhida. The Greek Catholic priest from Northeast Minneapolis drove only as far as St. Cloud, Minnesota before further progress was stopped by the infamous 1940 Armistice Day Blizzard. To the outrage of the remaining Greek Catholics of Browerville, they were still required to pay the priest's bill. The Holy Trinity Church building then fell into disuse and has since been demolished.

In 1990, the Traditional Catholic Sisters of the Society of Saint Pius X purchased the former Browerville hospital, which has been in use ever since as their Novitiate.

== Geography ==
According to the United States Census Bureau, the city has a total area of 1.06 square miles (2.75 km^{2}), all land. The Long Prairie River, flows near the town's eastern boundary. Eagle and Harris Creeks join the river near town Browerville is along U.S. Highway 71, and County Roads 14 and 21.

== Demographics ==
Historical population
Census	Pop.	Note	%±
1890	86		—
1900	466		441.9%
1910	633		35.8%
1920	681		7.6%
1930	709		4.1%
1940	786		10.9%
1950	735		−6.5%
1960	744		1.2%
1970	665		−10.6%
1980	693		4.2%
1990	782		12.8%
2000	735		−6.0%
2010	790		7.5%
2020	839		6.2%
U.S. Decennial Census

=== 2010 census ===
As of the census of 2010, there were 790 people, 326 households, and 196 families living in the city. The population density was 745.3 inhabitants per square mile (287.8/km^{2}). There were 366 housing units at an average density of 345.3 per square mile (133.3/km^{2}). The racial makeup of the city was 95.3% White, 0.6% African American, 0.4% Native American, 0.5% Asian, 1.8% from other races, and 1.4% from two or more races. Hispanic or Latino of any race were 3.8% of the population.

There were 326 households, of which 31.6% had children under the age of 18 living with them, 40.2% were married couples living together, 16.3% had a female householder with no husband present, 3.7% had a male householder with no wife present, and 39.9% were non-families. 34.7% of all households were made up of individuals, and 18.1% had someone living alone who was 65 years of age or older. The average household size was 2.31 and the average family size was 2.95.

The median age in the city was 37.8 years. 26.8% of residents were under the age of 18; 6.9% were between the ages of 18 and 24; 24.3% were from 25 to 44; 24.8% were from 45 to 64; and 17.1% were 65 years of age or older. The gender makeup of the city was 48.1% male and 51.9% female.

=== 2000 census ===
As of the census of 2000, there were 735 people, 318 households, and 181 families living in the city. The population density was 1,052.5 inhabitants per square mile (406.4/km^{2}). There were 337 housing units at an average density of 482.6 per square mile (186.3/km^{2}). The racial makeup of the city was 98.23% White, 0.54% Native American, 0.54% Asian, 0.14% from other races, and 0.54% from two or more races. Hispanic or Latino of any race were 0.95% of the population.

There were 318 households, out of which 27.7% had children under the age of 18 living with them, 47.5% were married couples living together, 6.9% had a female householder with no husband present, and 42.8% were non-families. 41.5% of all households were made up of individuals, and 27.0% had someone living alone who was 65 years of age or older. The average household size was 2.24 and the average family size was 3.10.

In the city, the population was spread out, with 25.3% under the age of 18, 6.7% from 18 to 24, 23.1% from 25 to 44, 22.6% from 45 to 64, and 22.3% who were 65 years of age or older. The median age was 41 years. For every 100 females, there were 78.0 males. For every 100 females age 18 and over, there were 72.6 males.

The median income for a household in the city was $26,250, and the median income for a family was $48,393. Males had a median income of $35,208 versus $24,375 for females. The per capita income for the city was $15,493. About 10.9% of families and 15.2% of the population were below the poverty line, including 18.0% of those under age 18 and 17.3% of those age 65 or over.

== Government ==
As of 2023 the mayor is Hannah Wieshalla and the City Council members are Alan Fenner, Angela Johnson, Christopher Minor and Sue Wiersgalla.

== Education ==
=== Public schools ===
Browerville Public Schools are part of the Browerville Public School District. The elementary and high schools are attached, at 620 Park Avenue North. The average class size ranges between 40 and 55 students. Browerville sports teams use Tigers as their mascot. In fall, football and volleyball are offered. In winter, boys basketball, girls basketball, and wrestling are offered. In spring, softball, baseball, boys and girls golf, and boys and girls track are offered. Along with that, cheerleading is offered in fall and winter. The mascot used to be the Broncos when they were paired with differing school districts for sports, but now they stick with the tigers. Browerville school has an out door swimming pool and offers summer swimming programs.

=== Private schools ===
Christ the King Catholic Church runs a parochial K-6 school at 750 North Main Street. Christ the King resulted in the combination of the two historical Roman Catholic parishes in Browerville: St. Joseph (Polish) and St. Peter (German). The initiative to combine the parishes was taken by the Diocese of St. Cloud, rather than by the faithful of these two parishes.

== Art ==
Christ the King Catholic Church is home to the sculptures Christ Prays in Gethsemane and Comforting Angel. Both pieces, found in the yard in front of the church, were sculpted by Browerville born Joseph Kiselewski in 1932. A number of Kiselewski's small sculptures, along with a photo display, can be seen at American Heritage Bank in Browerville.

== Notable people ==
- Joseph Kiselewski, sculptor; born in Browerville in 1901 and retired here in 1980.
- LaVyrle Spencer, best-selling author of contemporary and historical romance novels; born in Browerville.
- Lew Drill, born in Browerville, was a Major League baseball player for the Washington Senators (1901–1960), a team that would one day move to the state and become the Minnesota Twins. Drill was also a lawyer, and became the United States Attorney for the state of Minnesota.

== Gallery ==
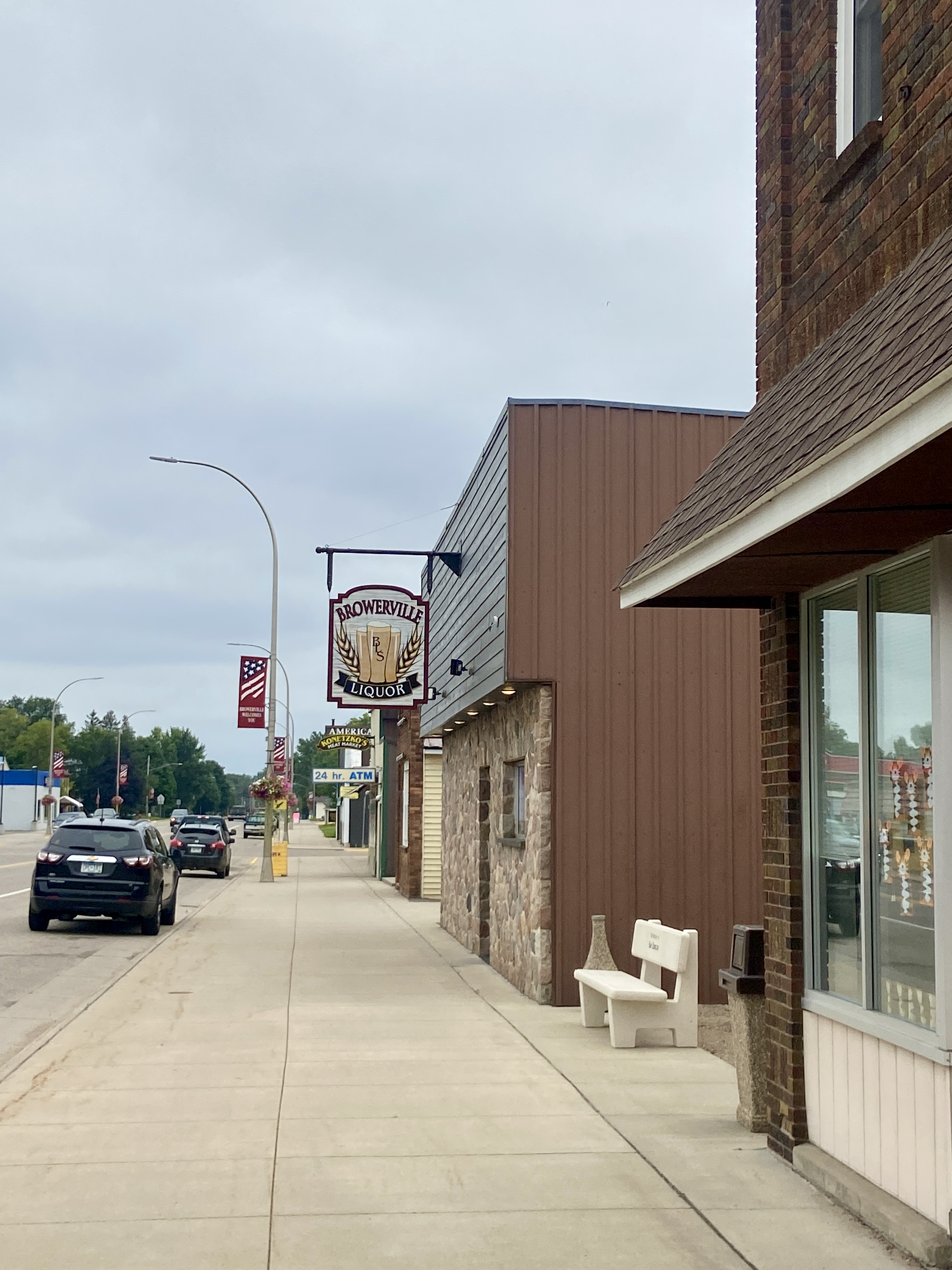
Browerville Municipal Liquor Store

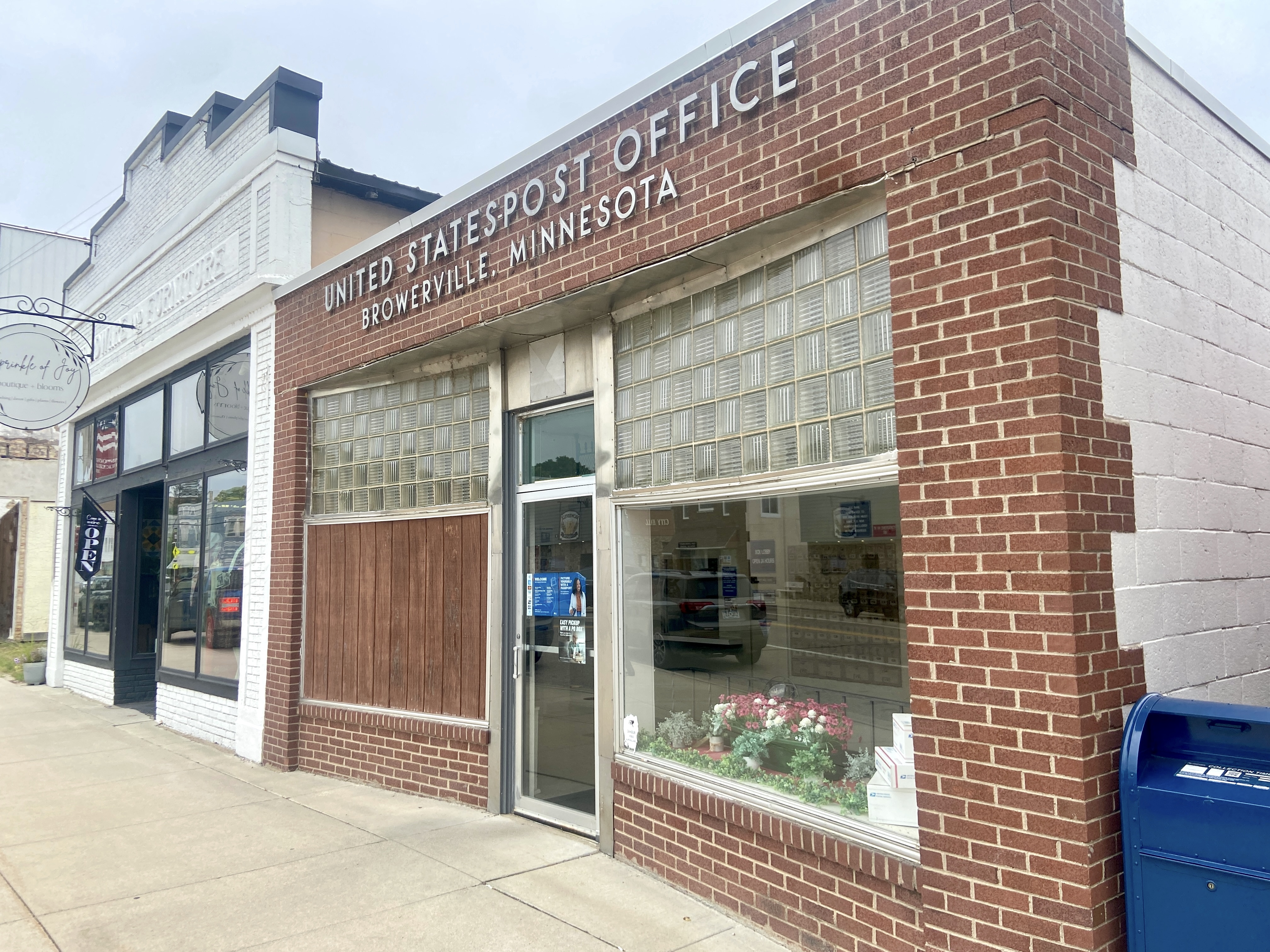
Post Office

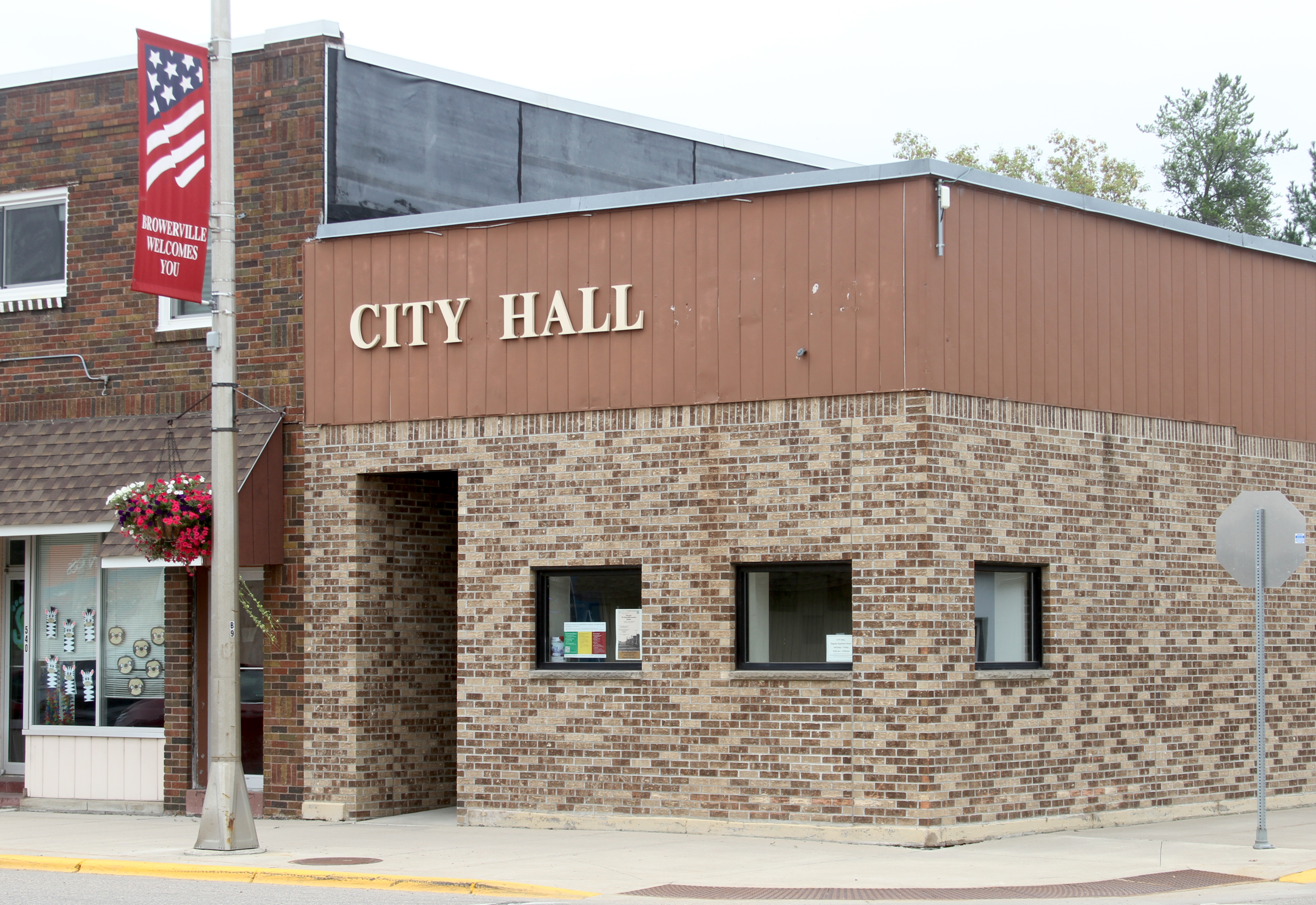
City Hall

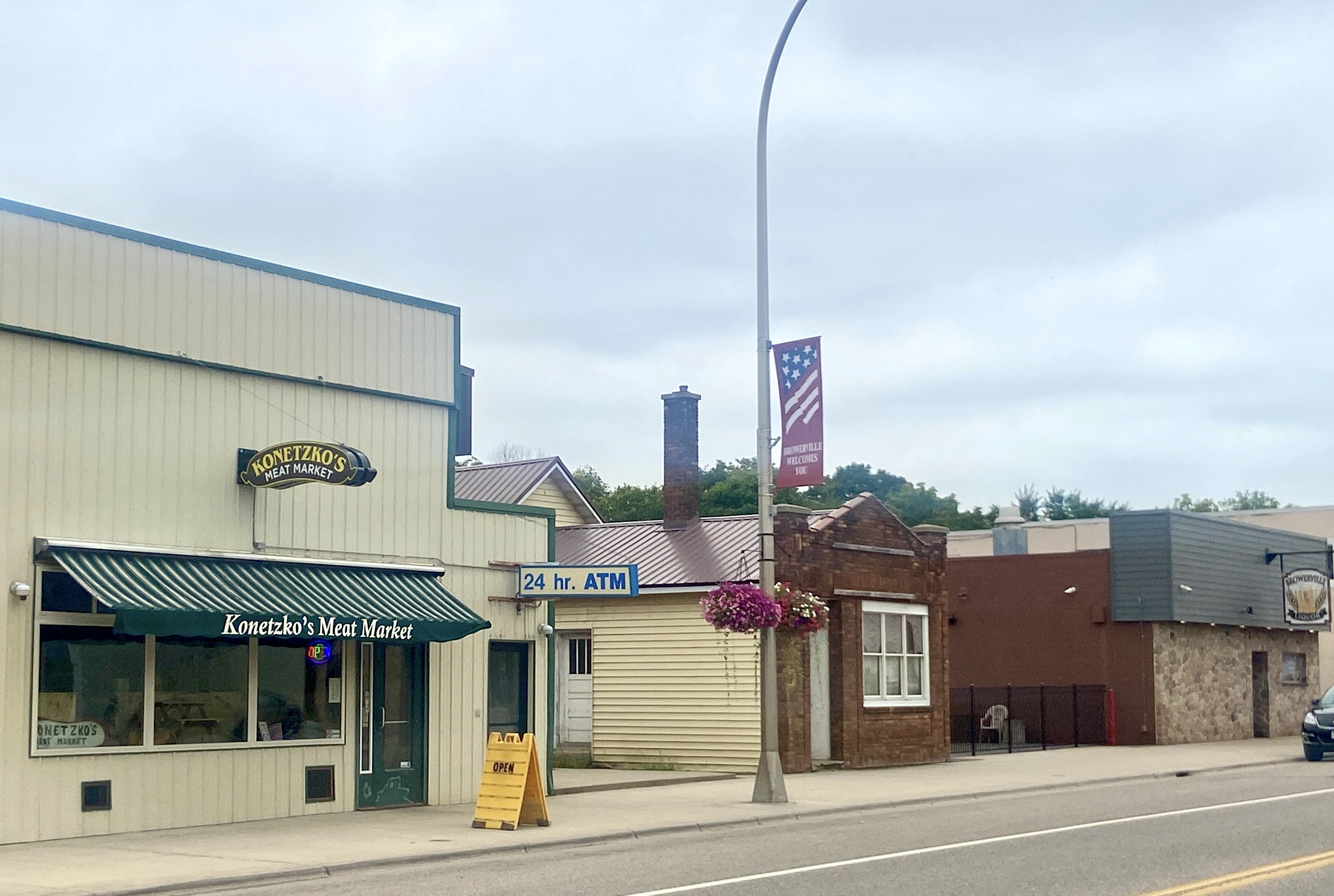
Main Street, looking west

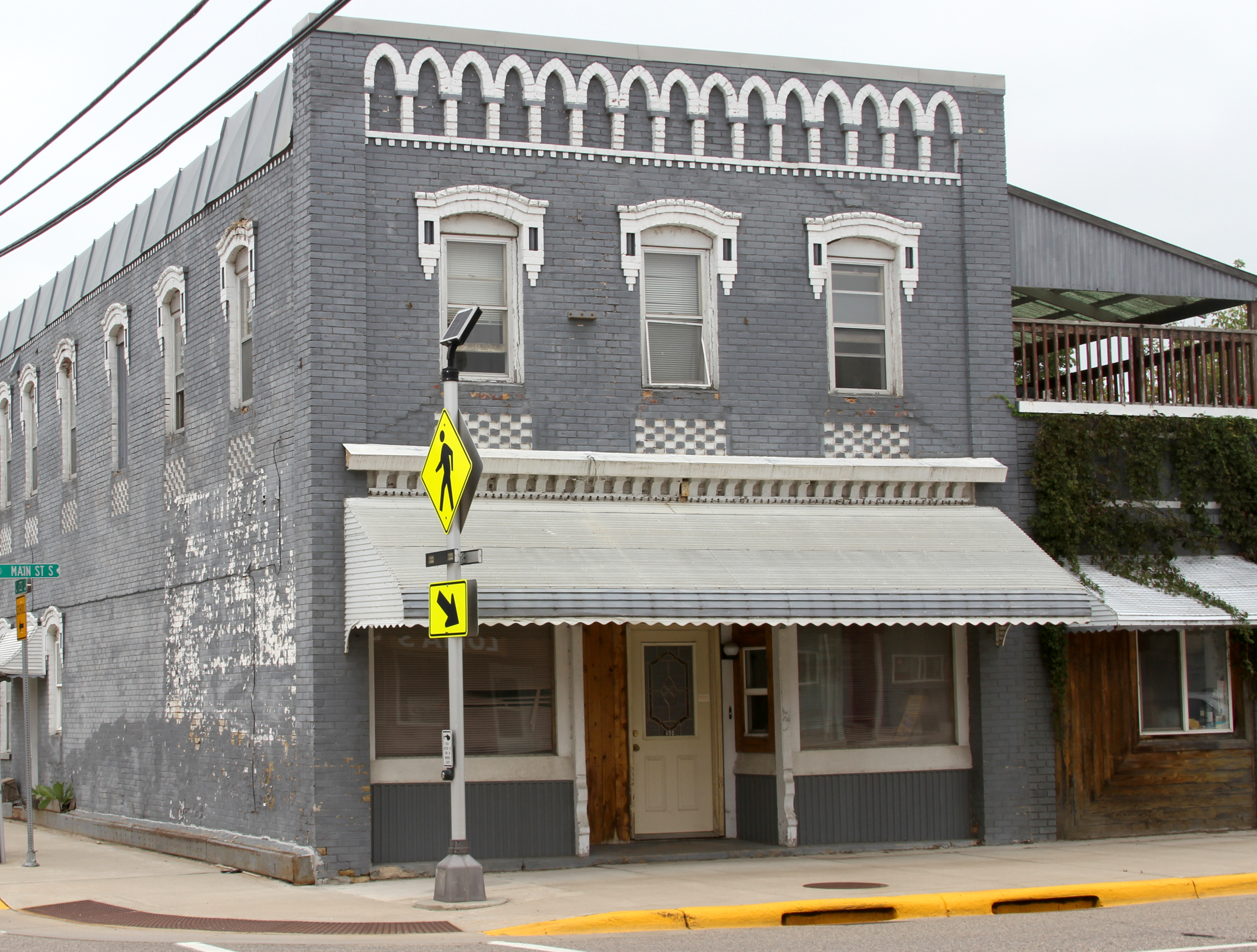
Building at Main and 6th Streets, looking northwest

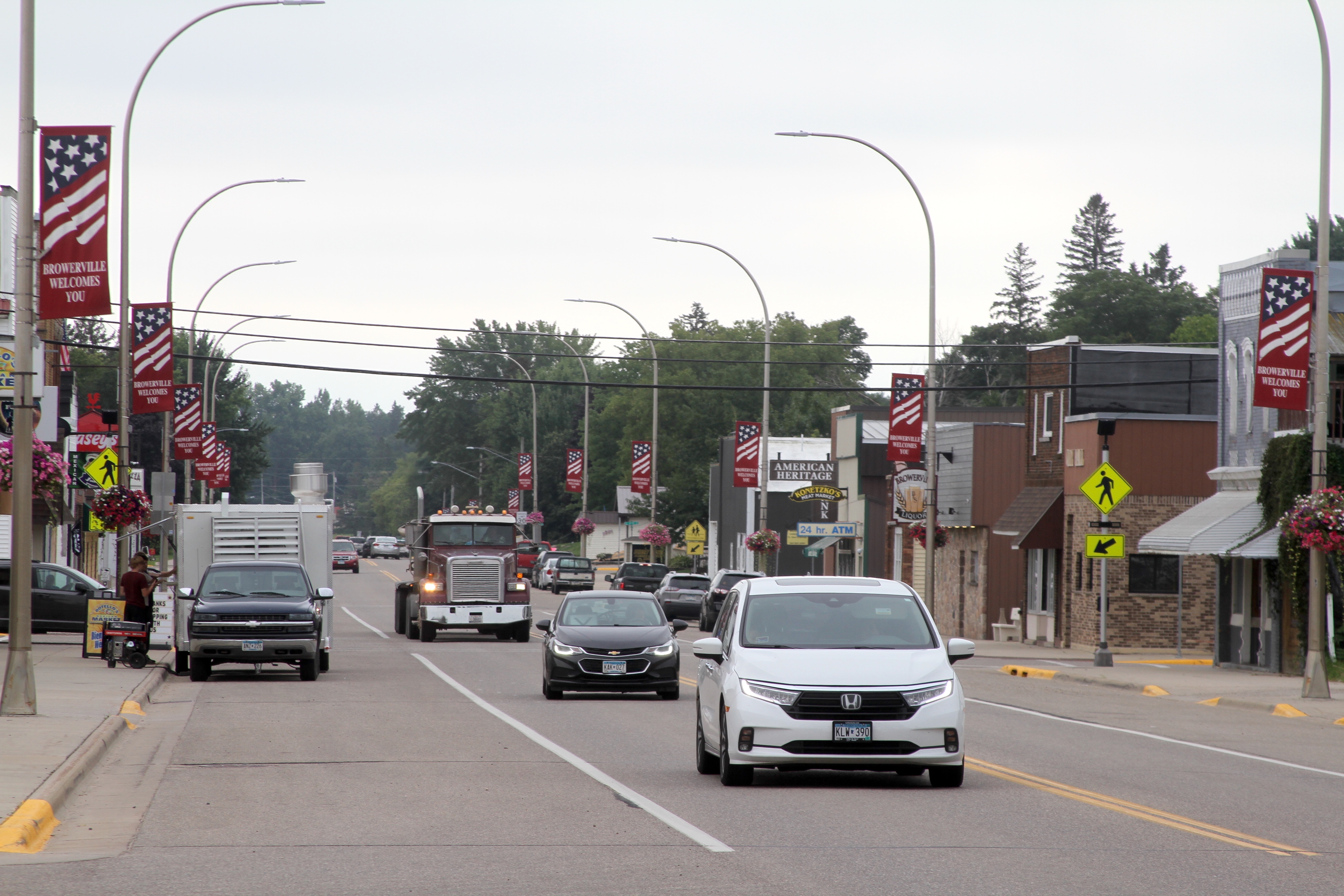
Main Street between 5th and 6th Streets, looking southwest

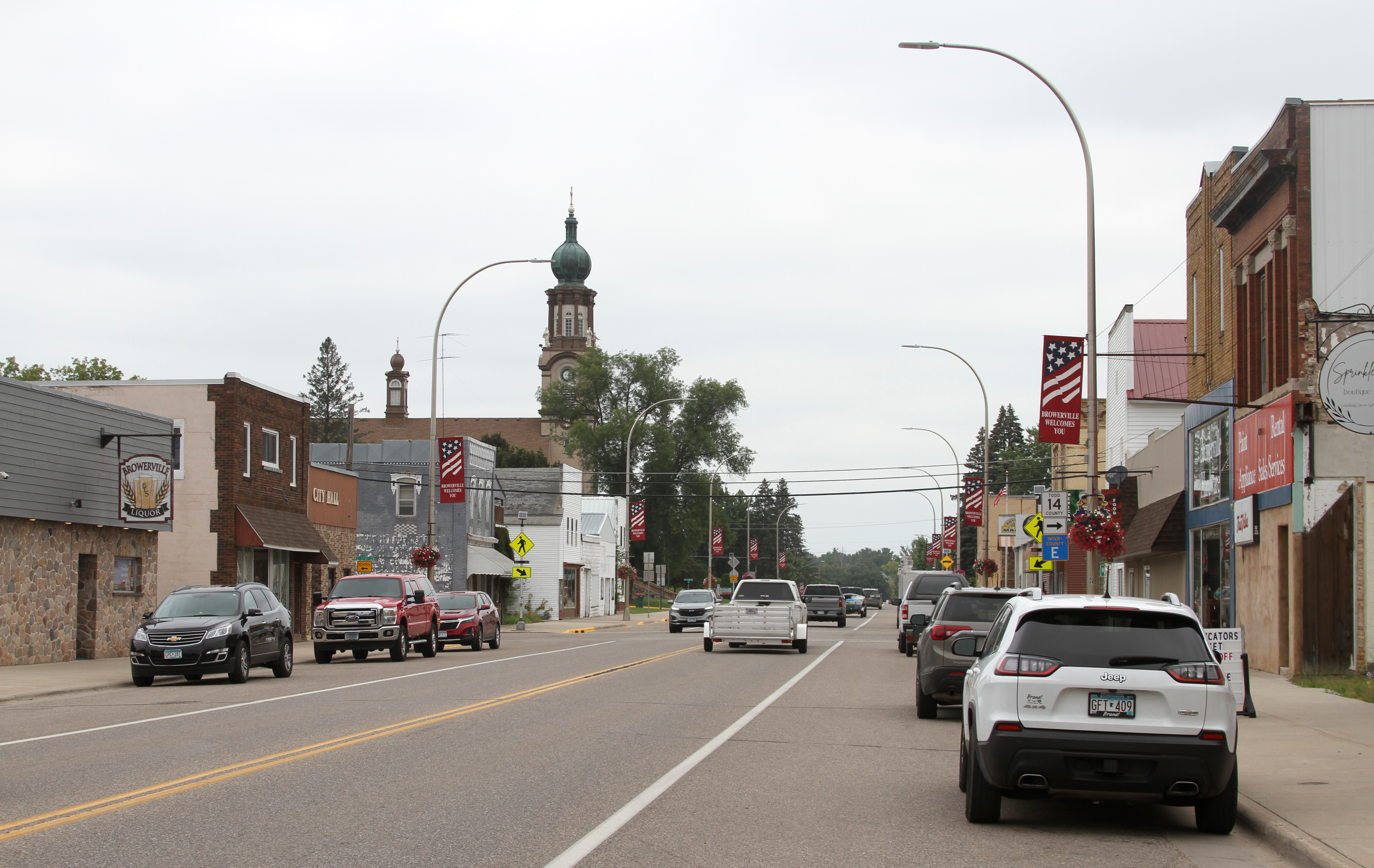
Main Street at 6th Street looking north

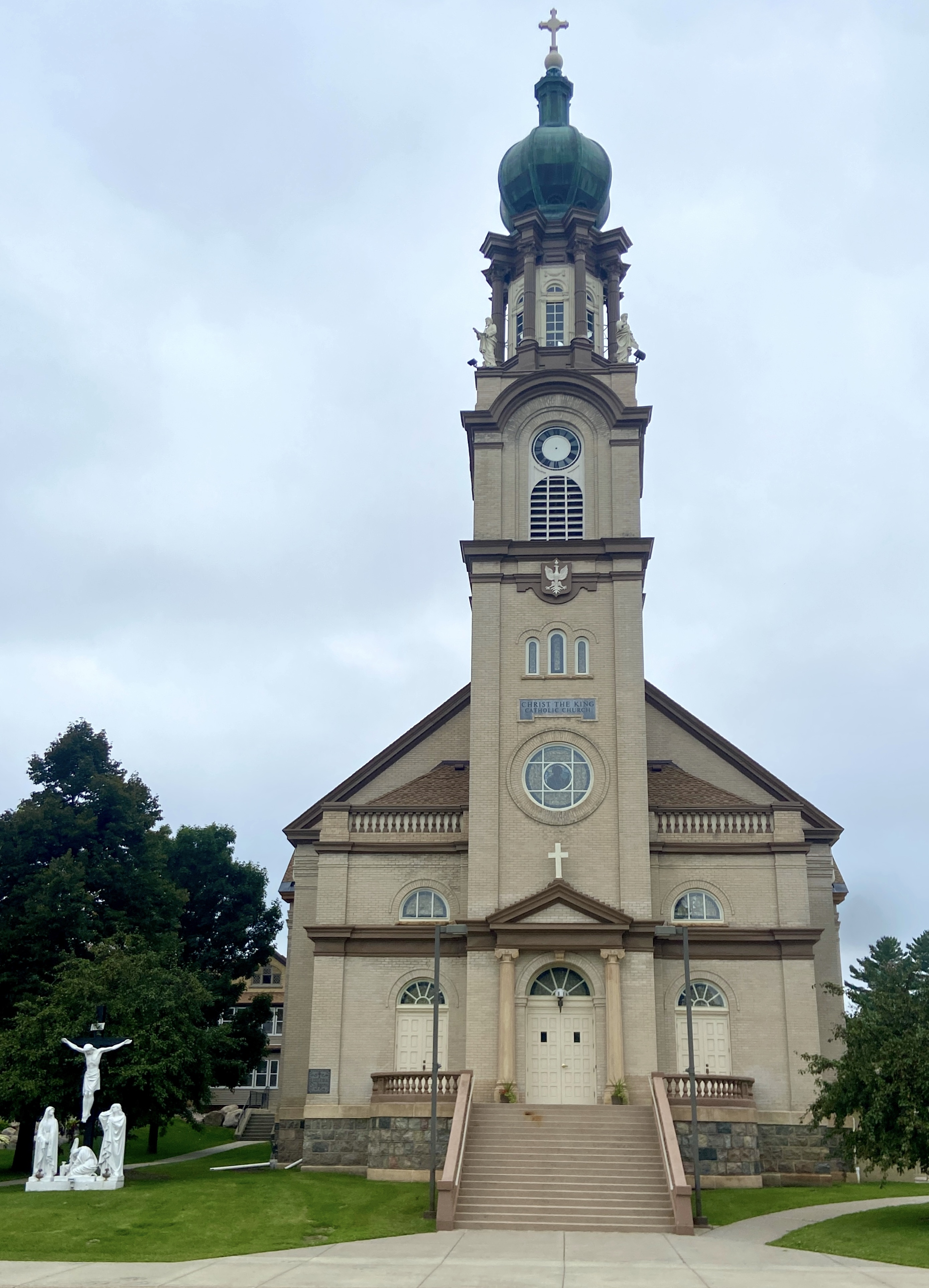
Christ the King Catholic Church
