= Vislanda =

- Location within Kronoberg Location within Sweden
- Coordinates: 56°47′N 14°27′E
- Country: Sweden
- Province: Småland
- County: Kronoberg County
- Municipality: Alvesta Municipality

Area
  - Total: 2.24 km^{2} (0.86 sq mi)

Population (31 December 2010)
  - Total: 1,769
  - Density: 790/km^{2} (2,000/sq mi)
- Time zone: UTC+1 (CET)
  - Summer (DST): UTC+2 (CEST)

Vislanda (Swedish: [ˈvɪ̂sːˌlanːda]) is a locality situated in Alvesta Municipality, Kronoberg County, Sweden with 1,769 inhabitants in 2010.
