= National Register of Historic Places listings in Douglas County, Minnesota =

Location of Douglas County in Minnesota

This is a list of the National Register of Historic Places listings in Douglas County, Minnesota. It is intended to be a complete list of the properties and districts on the National Register of Historic Places in Douglas County, Minnesota, United States. The locations of National Register properties and districts for which the latitude and longitude coordinates are included below, may be seen in an online map.

There are 14 properties and districts listed on the National Register in the county. A supplementary list includes one additional site that was formerly listed on the National Register.

This National Park Service list is complete through NPS recent listings posted April 24, 2026.

== Current listings ==
	Name on the Register	Image	Date listed	Location	City or town	Description
1	Alexandria Public Library	Alexandria Public Library	August 23, 1985 (#85001817)	7th Ave., W. and Fillmore St. 45°53′06″N 95°22′44″W	Alexandria	One of west-central Minnesota's largest Carnegie libraries, built in 1903 for a public institution established in the 1880s. Also noted for its Beaux-Arts architecture by Henry A. Foeller.
2	Alexandria Residential Historic District	Alexandria Residential Historic District	January 11, 1991 (#90002120)	Roughly bounded by Cedar and Douglas Sts. and Lincoln and 12th Aves. 45°52′57″N 95°22′59″W	Alexandria	Outstate Minnesota's largest and most intact late-19th/early-20th-century residential district, with 59 houses charting Alexandria's professional class and its architecture.
3	Basswood Shores Site	Basswood Shores Site	April 8, 1994 (#94000338)	Address restricted	Alexandria	Briefly occupied Late Woodland period campsite yielding Sandy Lake Ware ceramics, the southernmost documented examples of a style associated with possible ancestors of the Dakota people.
4	Brandon Auditorium and Fire Hall	Brandon Auditorium and Fire Hall	August 29, 1985 (#85001928)	105 Holmes Ave. 45°57′52″N 95°35′52″W	Brandon	Unique municipal hall built 1935–36, Minnesota's most creative WPA construction project and a symbol of its dual success in generating jobs and public buildings. Now the Brandon History Center.
5	Thomas F. Cowing House	Thomas F. Cowing House	August 23, 1985 (#85001821)	316 Jefferson St. 45°53′19″N 95°22′24″W	Alexandria	Regionally rare Gothic Revival cottage, one of Alexandria's oldest intact buildings, constructed c. 1875. Also associated with successive owners Thomas F. Cowing (1841–1916) and Gustave Kortsch (1850–1928), local merchants turned political and civic leaders.
6	Douglas County Courthouse	Douglas County Courthouse	August 23, 1985 (#85001816)	320 7th Ave., W. 45°53′03″N 95°22′54″W	Alexandria	1895 courthouse designed by Buechner & Jacobson; Douglas County's largest surviving Victorian building and long-serving seat of government.
7	Great Northern Passenger Depot	Great Northern Passenger Depot	August 15, 1985 (#85001760)	N. Broadway and Agnes Boulevard; 45°53′30″N 95°22′44″W	Alexandria	One of Minnesota's largest and most ornate stations on the Great Northern Railway, built in 1907. Also symbolic of the impact of the railroad on Alexandria and the local resort industry. Now a restaurant.
8	John B. Johnson House	John B. Johnson House	December 9, 1977 (#77000730)	U.S. Route 52; 45°52′02″N 95°08′59″W	Osakis	Unusual hexagonal house with plunging rooflines, built c. 1886 in hopes of withstanding high winds.
9	Lake Carlos State Park WPA/Rustic Style Group Camp	Lake Carlos State Park WPA/Rustic Style Group Camp	July 2, 1992 (#92000776)	Off Minnesota Highway 29 on the northeastern shore of Lake Carlos; 45°59′31″N 95°20′50″W	Carlos	Two park facilities built 1941–42, significant as examples of New Deal federal work relief, the development of Minnesota's state parks, and National Park Service rustic design.
10	Lake Carlos State Park WPA/Rustic Style Historic District	Lake Carlos State Park WPA/Rustic Style Historic District	July 2, 1992 (#89001654)	Off Minnesota Highway 29 on the northwestern shore of Lake Carlos; 45°59′43″N 95°20′41″W	Carlos	Three park facilities built 1938–1942, significant as examples of New Deal federal work relief, the development of Minnesota's state parks, and split stone National Park Service rustic design.
11	Knute Nelson House	Knute Nelson House	April 13, 1977 (#77000729)	1219 S. Nokomis St. 45°52′41″N 95°21′59″W	Alexandria	1872 house (remodeled in 1915) of pioneering Norwegian-American politician Knute Nelson (1843–1923), multiterm U.S. Representative, Governor of Minnesota, and U.S. Senator. Now houses the Douglas County Historical Society.
12	August Tonn Farmstead		September 25, 1985 (#85002485)	County Road 65; 45°59′39″N 95°17′09″W	Carlos	Rare, intact subsistence farm exhibiting pioneer log construction. Contains seven contributing properties built 1875–c. 1890.
13	U.S. Post Office-Alexandria	U.S. Post Office-Alexandria	April 16, 1979 (#79001238)	625 Broadway St. 45°53′06″N 95°22′38″W	Alexandria	1910 Renaissance Revival post office, an example of pre-World War I government architecture and the manifestation of Alexandria's importance in the communication infrastructure of west-central Minnesota.
14	Noah P. Ward House	Noah P. Ward House	August 23, 1985 (#85001822)	422 7th Ave., W. 45°53′04″N 95°23′00″W	Alexandria	One of Alexandria's largest and most sophisticated Victorian houses, built c. 1903 for early businessman and civic leader Noah P. Ward (1855–1927). Also a contributing property to the Alexandria Residential Historic District.

== Former listing ==
	Name on the Register	Image	Date listed	Date removed	Location	City or town	Description
1	Osakis Milling Company		July 2, 1986 (#86001407)	March 15, 1993	Lake Street and Central Avenue	Osakis	1887 flour mill. Demolished by the Minnesota Department of Natural Resources in 1990 to make a public access point to Lake Osakis.

== See also ==
- List of National Historic Landmarks in Minnesota
- National Register of Historic Places listings in Minnesota
