= Long Prairie River =

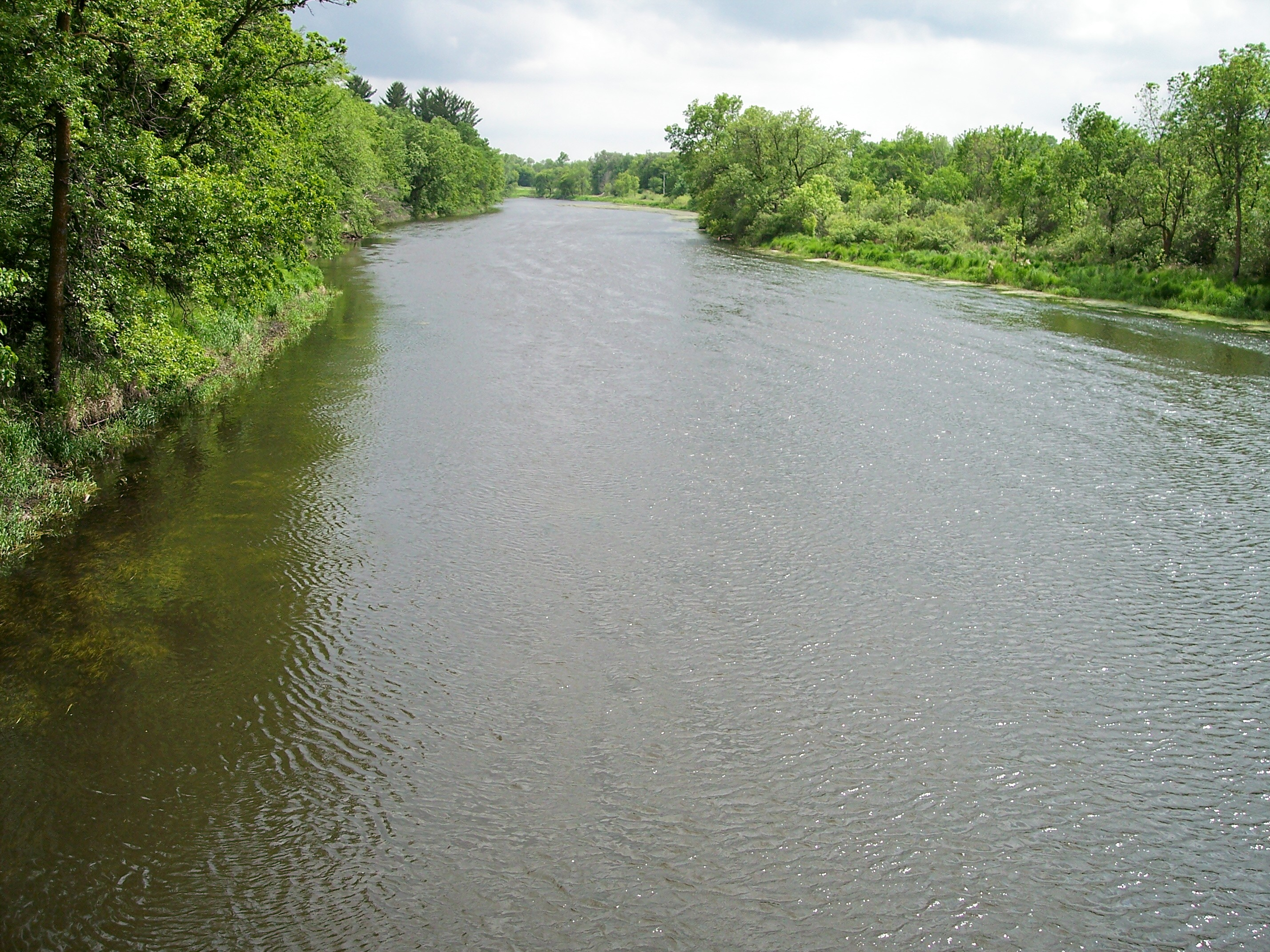
- The Long Prairie River in Moran Township in Todd County in 2007

- Location of mouth

Location
- Country: United States
- State: Minnesota
- County: Morrison, Cass, Todd, Douglas

Physical characteristics
- Source: Lake Carlos
  - location: Carlos Township, Douglas County
  - coordinates: 45°58′58″N 95°19′59″W
  - elevation: 1,353 ft (412 m)
- Mouth: Crow Wing River
  - location: Motley Township, Morrison County
  - coordinates: 46°19′27″N 94°36′46″W
  - elevation: 1,207 ft (368 m)
- Length: 96 mi (154 km)
- Basin size: 892 mi^{2} (2,310 km^{2})
- Discharge
  - location: Long Prairie
  - average: 166 cu ft/s (4.7 m^{3}/s)
  - minimum: 0.84 cu ft/s (0.024 m^{3}/s)
  - maximum: 3,270 cu ft/s (93 m^{3}/s)
- Discharge
  - location: Motley, MN
  - average: 255 cu/ft. per sec.

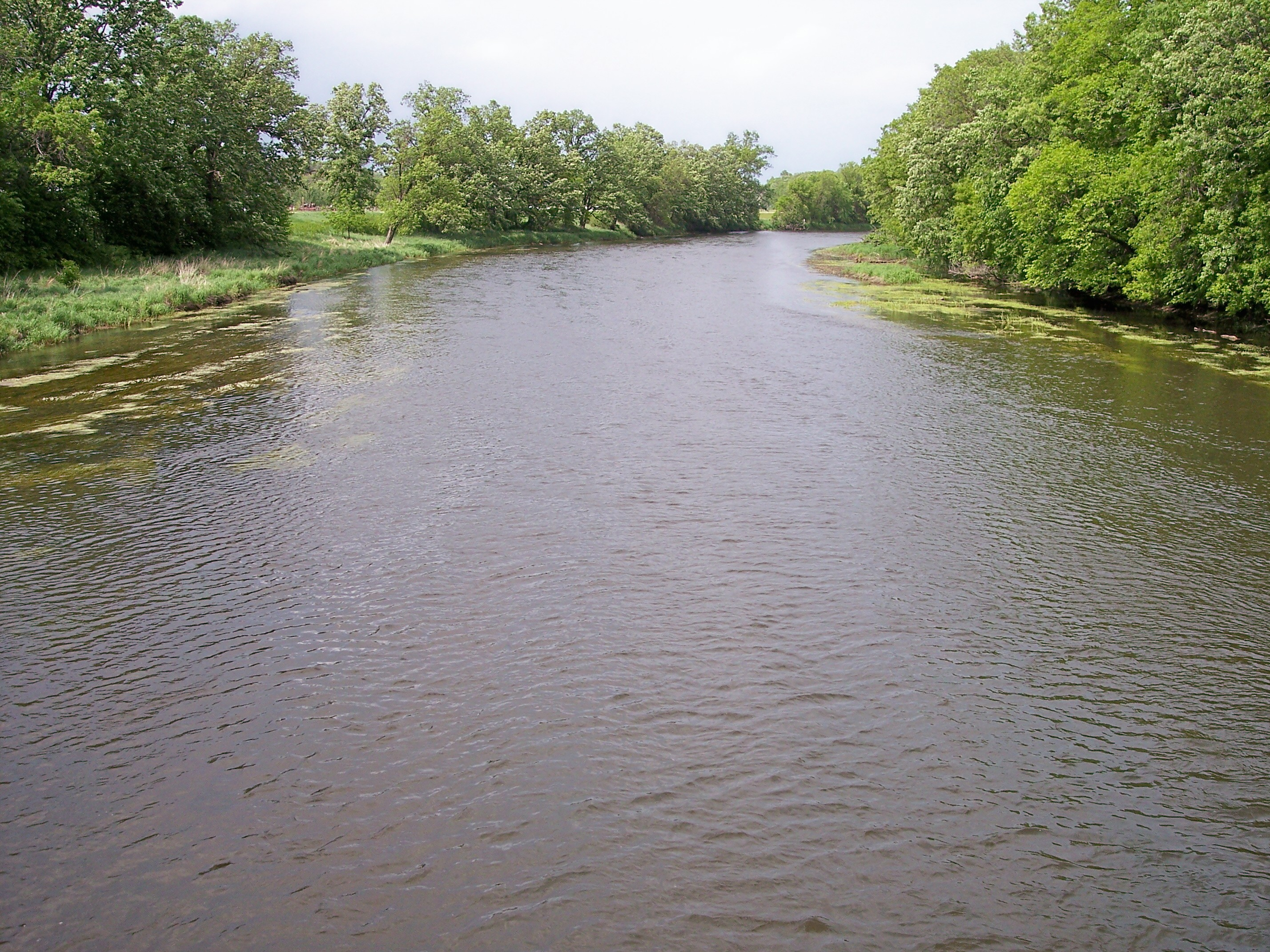
The Long Prairie River in Moran Township in 2007

The Long Prairie River is a tributary of the Crow Wing River, 96 miles (154 km) long, in central Minnesota in the United States. Via the Crow Wing River, it is part of the watershed of the Mississippi River, draining an area of 892 square miles (2,310 km^{2}) in a generally rural region.

== History ==
Prior to settlement by Europeans, the vicinity of the Long Prairie River was inhabited by the Dakota and Ojibwa. However, according to Schoolcraft, in 1832 the land about this river was uninhabited, being a boundary or war road between the Ojibwa and the Dakota. In the Chippewa treaties in 1847, the land on the west bank was ceded by the Pillager Chippewa as a homeland for the Menomini, and the land on the east bank was ceded by the Lake Superior Chippewa and the Mississippi Chippewa as a homeland for the Winnebagos, in anticipation of Indian removal out of Wisconsin upon statehood. By the treaty of 1846, the Winnebago tribe owned a vast wilderness area in central Minnesota Territory along the Long Prairie River, the Long Prairie Reservation. Due to ongoing skirmishes between the Pillager Chippewa and the Dakota Sioux, the Winnebagoes were in constant danger, so they requested relocation to southern Minnesota, near Mankato, and in 1855 ceded the land to the United States. Settlers had begun farming the region's prairies and clearing its timber by the 1860s.

The English name of the river, according to Gilfillan, is derived from the Ojibwa Ga-shagoshkodeia-zibi, transliterated "Long-narrow-Prairie river".

The Lonq Prairie River played a vital role in the early settlement pattern of Todd County. History describes the Long Prairie River valley as a hunting ground for the Dakota and Anishinaabe/Ojibwa, with the river itself providing a transportation link with the Crow Wing and Mississippi.

Starting as early as the 1840s the river and its grass-filled valley were where the settlers first established themselves. By the mid-1860s several settlements from the present site of Long Prairie to Motley were prospering, using flatboats, and for a very short time even a steamboat, for transportation and shipping. By 1877 the water level had fallen to a point that only very small watercraft could navigate the river on a regular basis. In late 1877 H.D. Orendorf cut a road down the west side of the river from Turtle Creek to Motley. For many years this was the only road down the river valley.

Some of the villages that grew up along the 100-mile (160 km) length of the Long Prairie have prospered, while some have disappeared completely. Hartford, on the east bank of the river, opposite the mouth of Eagle Creek, was settled in 1865 by John Bassett, who was attracted to the area by the open grasslands north of the river. The railroad brought about the demise of Hartford when it was built on the west side of the river, the Hartford community migrated to it and became what is now known as Browerville. Hartford is now a township in Todd County.

Long Prairie was never a river town like Hartford. In the 1840s it was settled as the administrative headquarters for carrying out the agreement between the U.S. government and the Winnebago (now Ho-Chunk) Indians. The settlement developed along Venewitz Creek and was said to be more populous than St. Paul at that time. In 1855 the Winnebago had been moved to a reservation in Blue Earth County in southern Minnesota, and the lands were sold to investors from Ohio. The settlement was abandoned during the 1862 Dakota uprising. The area was slowly repopulated by settlers passing through the area who stayed, in many cases, because of the availability of the already constructed buildings and homes.

At the end of the Civil War the communities west of Long Prairie were settled by Southern soldiers who had fought for the Union Army that were not very welcome in their home state of Kentucky. Once located at the present intersection of County Roads 38 and 11, Whiteville was settled by the three White sisters and their families. Clotho was settled where it is because, it seems, settlers couldn't go any further given that the forests and swamps to the west were impenetrable.

At the time of Todd County's original European settlement, the forested areas of the Long Prairie River watershed were substantial. The Marshner Pre-European Settlement Vegetation Map shows that 65.5% of the area was covered by a variety of hardwoods and pines. The first commercial logging began about 1866 and continued through the mid-1890s. Eagle, Moran, Fish Trap, and Turtle creeks were all large enough, at that time, to power mills and float logs to the Long Prairie River where they joined other log rafts on their way to the Crow Wing and to the Mississippi. As most of the trees were harvested, the sandy soils in these areas were left unprotected, increasing erosion, and gradually filling the streams with sediment. The result is the very much smaller streams we have today. The 1990s Land Use map shows only 21% of the area forested, much restored due to reforestation plantings, and over 60% of the area as cultivated, hay, pasture or grassland.

As the Long Prairie River watershed was settled, roads and railroads took over the job of transportation and shipping. Landowners used the river as a source of water for themselves, their livestock, and more recently, for irrigation. Industry located along the riverbanks and used the river as a source of water and as a discharge point for the waste materials generated by their companies. Few cities and villages used the river for drinking water, because the shallow sand aquifer along the river provided easy access to well water. Wastewater, however, was and still is discharged to the river and to Eagle Creek, one of the larger tributaries.

Early irrigation used mostly surface water sources, primarily the Long Prairie River. In the dry years of the late 1970s, many irrigation systems were shut down at critical times because of low surface water levels. This action prompted most irrigators to change over to wells. To this day, irrigation systems are flourishing in the deep water-rich sands of the Long Prairie River Valley, but by 1994, only 14 surface water permits still existed in Todd County.

== Geography ==
The headwaters of the Long Prairie River are in a region of numerous lakes north of Alexandria. It issues from Lake Carlos in Carlos Township in Douglas County, just south of Lake Carlos State Park and approximately 7 miles (11 km) north-northeast of Alexandria. Tributaries to Lake Carlos, which drain several lakes including Lake Darling, Lake Ida, Lake Miltona, and Geneva Lake, account for approximately a quarter of the Long Prairie River's watershed. The river initially flows eastwardly into Todd County . A judicial ditch starting in Section 22 of Leslie Township in Todd County connects the river to Lake Osakis, which is the source of the Sauk River, thereby joining the two rivers' watersheds during periods of high water. At the city of Long Prairie the river turns north-northeastwardly, flowing past Browerville and through the Long Prairie River Wildlife Management Area in Ward Township and then into northwestern Morrison County, where it enters the Crow Wing River from the south in Motley Township, about a mile (2 km) southeast of Motley. The Long Prairie River and its watershed were influenced and shaped by a Glacier that covered the region at various intervals during the late Pleistocene. Most of the river's watershed is within the North Central Hardwood Forest ecoregion, which is characterized by hardwood forests of maple and basswood mixed with conifers, on outwash plains and moraines amid flat glacial lakes.

According to the Minnesota Pollution Control Agency, 41% of the Long Prairie River's watershed below Lake Carlos is used for agriculture; the main crops are potatoes, corn, soybeans and alfalfa. 24% of the watershed is grassland including pasture; 21% is forested; 10% is water or wetland; and 3% is urban or developed. Because the river's floodplain is wide and flat, land immediately adjacent to the river is predominantly agricultural or wetland. Agricultural use is not dominant along the upper (eastward) course of the river, which was historically covered by aspen and oak forest, wetlands, and tallgrass prairie; downstream of Browerville, farmland and second-growth forest are interspersed.

The Minnesota Department of Natural Resources has identified the Long Prairie River as a route for canoeing. Fish species in the river include northern pike, walleye, smallmouth bass, and largemouth bass.

== Flow rate ==
At the United States Geological Survey's stream gauge in the city of Long Prairie, the annual mean flow of the river between 1972 and 2005 was 166 cubic feet per second (4.7 m^{3}/s). The highest recorded flow during the period was 3,270 cu ft/s (93 m^{3}/s) on July 22, 1972. The lowest recorded flow was 0.84 cu ft/s (0.024 m^{3}/s) on January 12, 1977.

== See also ==
- List of rivers of Minnesota
