= Sauk people =

Indigenous people from the Northeastern Woodlands, U.S.

Sauk
Thâkîwaki
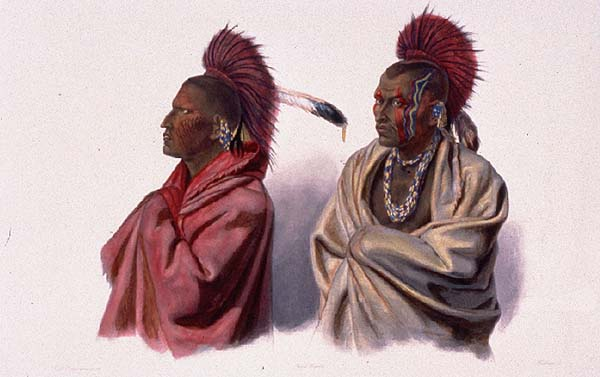
- Massika, a Sauk Indian, left, with Wakusasse (Meskwaki) at right. Aquatint of painting by Karl Bodmer, made at St. Louis in Spring 1833 when Massika pleaded for the release of war chief Black Hawk following the Black Hawk War

Total population
- 3,794

Regions with significant populations
- Formerly Michigan and Wisconsin, currently Iowa, Kansas, Nebraska, Oklahoma

Languages
- Sauk, English

Related ethnic groups
- Meskwaki, Kickapoo

The Sauk or Sac (Sauk: Thâkîwaki) are Native Americans and Indigenous peoples of the Northeastern Woodlands. Their historical territory was near Green Bay, Wisconsin. Today they have three tribes based in Iowa, Kansas, Nebraska, and Oklahoma. Their federally recognized tribes are:

- Sac and Fox Nation of Missouri in Kansas and Nebraska
- Sac and Fox Nation, Oklahoma
- Sac and Fox Tribe of the Mississippi in Iowa.

They are closely allied with the Meskwaki people. Their Sauk language is part of the Algonquian language family.

== Name ==
The Sauk or Sac called themselves Thâkîwaki, translating as "people coming forth [from the outlet]" or "[from the water]". Their autonym is written oθaakiiwaki in the current orthography. Ojibwe people called them Ozaagii(-wag). The latter name was transliterated into French and English by European colonists.

The neighboring Anishanabeg Ojibwe (Meskwaki: Ochipwêwa) and Odawa peoples referred to them by the exonym Ozaagii(-wag), meaning "those at the outlet". French colonists transliterated that as Sac and the English as "Sauk". The Sauk/Sac called themselves the autonym of Othâkîwa, Thâkîwa, Thâkîwaki or Asaki-waki/Oθaakiiwaki people of the yellow earth ("people coming forth [from the outlet]," i.e., "from the water"), which is often interpreted to mean "yellow-earth people" or "the Yellow-Earths", due to the yellow-clay soils found around Saginaw Bay. This interpretation possibly derived from the Sauk words Athâwethiwa or Athâw(i) ("yellow") and Neniwaki ("men, people"). This was later shortened to "Asaki-waki". In addition, the Meskwaki were generally known among neighboring tribes as the "people of the red earth". The Sauk and Meskwaki also used this term: Êshkwîha or Meshkwahkîha ("people of the red earth").

== History ==
=== Precontact to 17th century ===
The Sauk, an Algonquian people, are believed to have developed as a people along the St. Lawrence River, which is now northern New York. The precise time is unknown, but around the time of the year 1600, they were driven from the area of the St. Lawrence River. Some historians believe that the Sauk migrated to what is now eastern Michigan, where they settled around Saginaw Bay (Ojibwe: Zaagiinaad-wiikwed, lit. '"Of the Outlet Bay"'). For many years, the Sauk are believed to have prospered in the fertile valley of Saginaw thereafter. They had been driven west by pressure from other tribes, especially the powerful Haudenosaunee, which sought control over hunting grounds in the area.

Some Ojibwe oral histories also place the Sauk in the Saginaw Valley some time before the arrival of Europeans. Sauk traditions state that the tribe occupied the vicinity of Saginaw river. (In this tradition, the name 'Saginaw' comes from the Ojibwe "O-Sauk-e-non," meaning "land of the Sauks" or "where the Sauks were.") Approximately from the years 1638 to 1640, it is believed that a fierce battle ensued, nearly annihilating the entire Sauk Tribe. According to the legend, the Ojibwe inhabited the lands north of the Saginaw Bay, and the harsher northern climate caused more difficulty in prosperity compared to that of the Sauk occupying the area of Saginaw Valley. The Ojibwe allied with the Odawa, who resided south of the Sauk, and sprung a series of attacks on the Sauk, which practically decimated their people. One such attack, the Battle of Skull Island, occurred on a peninsula in the Saginaw River, which then was called Skull Island (its name came from the many skulls and bones supposedly found in mounds on that island over the years). In this battle, it is said that the Sauk had used their boats to cross part of the river, escape to the island, and were temporarily free from their attackers. But when morning came, ice had solidified the river enough for the Ojibwe to cross. They killed every member of the Sauk tribe who had fled to that island besides 12 women whom they later sent west of the Mississippi River.

Later Europeans may have mistakenly recorded the Sauk as once dwelling at this location near Lake Huron. There is little archaeological evidence that the Sauk lived in the Saginaw area. In the early 17th century, when natives told French explorer Samuel de Champlain that the Sauk nation was located on the west shore of Lake Michigan, Champlain mistakenly placed them on the western shore of Lake Huron. This mistake was copied on subsequent maps, and future references identified this as the place of the Sauk. Champlain never visited what is now Michigan.

Anishinaabe expansion and the Wendat (Wendat) attempting to gain regional stability drove the Sac out of their territory. The Wendat were armed with guns supplied by their French trading partners. The Sauk moved south to territory in parts of what are now northern Illinois and Wisconsin. In the 17th century the Sauk also maintained close relations with the Potawatomi (Pehkînenîha or Shîshîpêhinenîha). This relation has been found by borrowings of Sauk vocabulary that appear in the Potawatomi language.

In a loose coalition of tribes – including Dakota (Ashâha), Ho-Chunk, Ojibwe, Odawa, Potawatomi, Kickapoo (Kîkâpôwa), Meskwaki (Fox), and Sauk, along with the Shawnee (Shâwanôwa), Cherokee (Shanahkîha), and Choctaw (Châkitâha) from the Southeast – they attacked the tribes of the Illinois Confederation (Mashkotêwa) and tried to invade their tribal areas. The Illinois (Inoca) became their worst common enemies. The coalition warred for years until they destroyed the Illinois Confederation.

Later they moved out on the prairie (Mashkotêwi) along the Mississippi and adopted the semi-sedentary lifestyle of Plains Indians (Mashkotêwineniwa). In addition to hunting American bison, they lived in villages, raised crops, and actively traded with other tribes. The Sauk and allied eastern tribes had to compete with tribes who already occupied this territory. Disputes and clashes arose with the Dakota, Pawnee (Pânîha) and, most of all, the powerful Osage (Washâsha).

=== 18th century ===
The Sauk had good relations with the English (Thâkanâsha) through trading. At first, the Sauk had good relations with New France too, until their alliance with the Meskwaki (Fox) made them short-term enemies of the French (Mêmehtekôshîha, Wêmehtekôshîha).

A closely allied tribe, the Meskwaki, were noted for resisting French encroachment, having fought two wars against them in the early 18th century. After a devastating battle of September 9, 1730, in Illinois, in which hundreds of warriors were killed and many women and children taken captive by French allies, Fox refugees took shelter with the Sac. This made the Sauk subject to French attack in turn. The Fox and the Sauk had interests in lead mines which were secondary to the fur trade in their country. However, the Sauk continued moving west to Iowa and Kansas. Keokuk and Black Hawk were two important leaders who arose among the Sauk. At first, Keokuk accepted the loss of land as inevitable in the face of the vast numbers of white soldiers and settlers coming west. He tried to preserve tribal land and his people, and to keep the peace.

=== 19th century ===
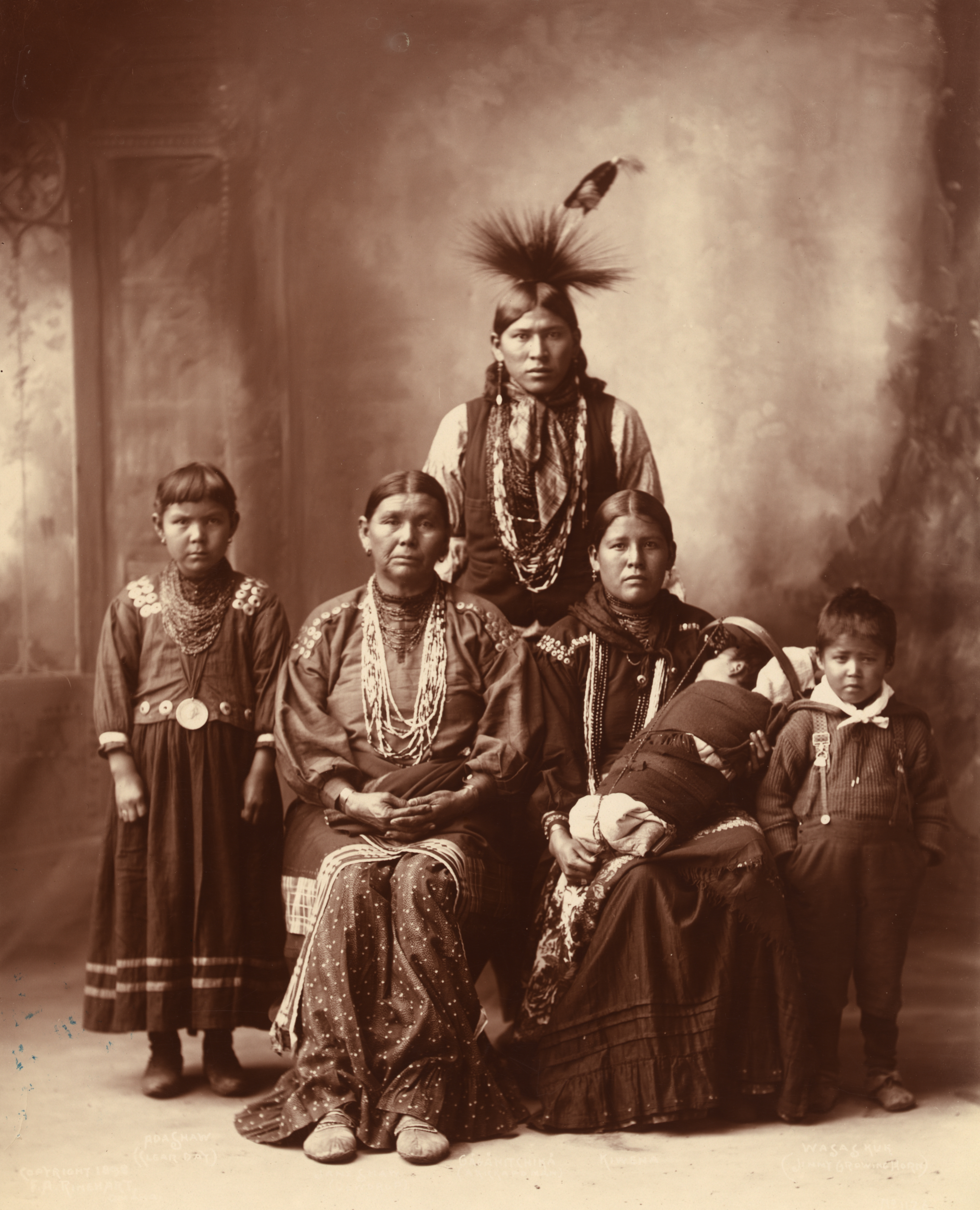
Sauk Indian family photographed by Frank Rinehart in 1899

Having failed to receive expected supplies from the Americans on credit, Black Hawk wanted to fight, saying his people were "forced into war by being deceived". Led by Black Hawk in 1832, the mainly Sac band resisted the continued loss of lands (in western Illinois, this time.) Their warfare with United States forces resulted in defeat at the hands of General Edmund P. Gaines in the Black Hawk War.

From 1832 to 1837, debt and poverty were tools used to coerce the Sauk and Meskwaki to relocate three times following successive cessions of territory. The population of the two tribes living in Iowa was halved in the twelve years from 1833 to 1845.

=== Oklahoma history ===
About this time, one group of Sac moved into Missouri, and later to Kansas and Nebraska. In 1869, after the Civil War, the United States forced the larger group of Sac to move into a reservation in Indian Territory (now the state of Oklahoma). They formed the federally recognized Sac and Fox Nation, which is misnamed and is primarily Sauk. The United States had been making treaties with the two tribes together since their residency in the Midwest. A number of Meskwaki returned to the Midwest from Oklahoma or resisted leaving. They joined the Meskwaki at the Meskwaki Settlement in Tama County, Iowa.

The land currently occupied by the Sauk is only a section of what used to be the Sac and Fox Reservation from 1867 to 1891. This reservation was established by the U.S. and spanned 480,000 acres. In 1887, however, the Dawes Act purposely broke collective tribal lands into small allotments designated for individual households. The remainder of land not allotted to the Sac and Fox was then sold to non-Native settlers in an attempt to gain Oklahoma statehood and the full assimilation of its Native American population.

By 1889, 519 members of the tribe were located in Indian Territory, what is now central Oklahoma. On June 10, 1890, they ceded these Indian Territory lands to the federal government.

=== Treaties with the United States ===
Many of the latter treaties listed have little to no information regarding their details, besides the date. The Sauk signed a total of 22 treaties from 1789 to 1891.

- Treaty of Fort Harmar
- Treaty of Greenville
- Treaty of Greenville (1814)
- Treaty of St. Louis (1804)
- Treaty of Portage des Sioux
- Treaty of St. Louis (1816)
- Treaty of St. Louis (1822)
- Treaty of Washington
- First Treaty of Prairie du Chien
- Fourth Treaty of Prairie du Chien
- 1832 Treaty
- September 27, 1836 Treaty
- September 28, 1836 Treaty
- September 28, 1836 Treaty
- 1837 Treaty
- 1837 Treaty
- 1842 Treaty
- 1854 Treaty (Missouri Sac and Fox)
- 1859 Treaty
- 1861 Treaty (Iowa Sac and Fox)
- Feb 18th, 1867
- June 10, 1872 "Act of Congress" (Missouri Sac and Fox)
- Feb 13th, 1891 "Act of Congress"

== Clan system ==
The Sauk and Fox peoples were divided into two moieties or "divisions", which in turn were subdivided into patri-lineages and clans as local subgroups (segments).

The moieties were known as the Kishko/Ki-sko-ha/Kîshkôha (male: Kîshkôha female: Kîshkôhkwêha) ("the long-haired") and as the Oskush/Askasa/Shkasha (male: Shkasha/Oshkashîwiwa, female: Shkashîhkwêwa/Oshkashîhkwêwiwa) ("the brave"). The two moieties were each symbolized by two colors: The Askasa/Shkasha painted their faces and partly their bodies with charcoal in mahkatêwâwi (black) and the Ki-sko-ha/Kîshkôha painted their bodies with white clay in wâpeshkyâwi (white). This duality was also celebrated by the two moieties in Lacrosse, which was often played extremely brutally to toughen young warriors for combat, for recreation, as part of festivals, and used as preparation for imminent wars or raids.

This division has survived to the present day, but is now more related to the political system of the United States: the supporters of the Democratic Party are associated with the Kîshkôha/Kîshkôhkwêha, while the supporters of the Republican Party are associated with the Shkasha/Shkashîhkwêwa.

Originally, the Sauk had a patrilineal and exogamous clan system, in which descent and inheritance was traced through the father. Clans or Mîthonî distinguished and named on the basis of totem animals, which are: Mahkwithowa (Bear Clan), Amehkwithowa (Beaver Clan), Peshekethiwithowa (Deer Clan), Ketiwithowa / Mekethiwithowa (Eagle Clan), Nemêthithowa (Fish Clan), Wâkoshêhithowa (Fox Clan), Kehchikamîwithowa (Ocean/Sea/Great Lake Clan), Keshêhokimâwithowa (Peace Clan), Ahpenîthowa (Potato Clan), Akônithowa (Snow Clan), Nenemehkiwithowa (Thunder Clan), Manethenôkimâwithowa (Warrior Clan), and Mahwêwithowa (Wolf Clan).

Saukenuk or Saukietown (today: Black Hawk State Historic Site) near the mouth of the Rock River (Sinnissippi – "rocky waters") into the Mississippi (Mäse'sibowi – "great river"), the most important Sauk settlement in the 18th and 19th centuries with about 4,000 inhabitants, was divided into 12 districts, which were assigned to the respective clans.

The tribe was governed by a council of sacred clan chiefs, a war chief, the head of families, and the warriors. Chiefs were recognized in three categories: civil, war, and ceremonial. Only the civil chiefs were hereditary. The other two chiefs were recognized by bands after they demonstrated their ability or spiritual power.

This traditional manner of selecting historic clan chiefs and governance was replaced in the 19th century by the United States appointing leaders through their agents at the Sac and Fox Agency, or reservation in Indian Territory (now Oklahoma). In the 20th century, the tribe adopted a constitutional government patterned after the United States form. They elect their chiefs.

== Federally recognized tribes ==
Today, the federally recognized Sac and Fox tribes include:

- Sac and Fox Nation (Meskwaki: Othâkîwaki, meaning: "People of the yellow earth"), headquartered in Stroud, Oklahoma;
- Sac and Fox Tribe of the Mississippi in Iowa (Meskwaki: Meshkwahkîhaki, meaning: "People of the red earth"), headquartered in Tama, Iowa; and
- Sac and Fox Nation of Missouri in Kansas and Nebraska (Meskwaki: Nîmahâhaki), headquartered in Reserve, Kansas.

== Geographical names ==
Lake Osakis in west-central Minnesota, the Sauk River, which flows from Lake Osakis, and the towns of Osakis, Sauk Centre, and Sauk Rapids all were named for association historically with a small party of Sac who made camp on the shores of Lake Osakis. They had been banished from their tribe for murder. According to Anishinaabe oral tradition, these five Sac were killed by local Dakota in the late 18th century.

Place names with "Sauk" references include:

- Iowa: Sac City, Sac County, and Sac Township.
- Illinois: Sauk Village; Sauk Valley: the cities of Dixon, Sterling, Rock Falls and the surrounding area; Sauk Trail, a winding road south of Chicago, said to follow an old Indian trail; Johnson-Sauk Trail State Recreation Area; and Black Hawk College [Moline and Kewanee, IL].
- Michigan: The name of Saginaw is believed to mean "where the Sauk were" in Ojibwe; and the Saginaw Trail is said to follow an ancient Native American trail. US Route 12 in Michigan is said to follow the Sauk Native American trail.
- Minnesota: City of Sauk Centre, Le Sauk and Little Sauk townships, Lake Osakis, Sauk River, Sauk Rapids.
- Missouri: Sac Township, Sac River and Little Sac River of southwest Missouri
- North Dakota: Sauk Prairie and Sauk Valley Township
- Wisconsin: Prairie du Sac, Sauk City, Saukville, Sauk County and Ozaukee County

== Notable people ==
- Black Hawk
- Checokalako
- Keokuk
- Do-Hum-Me
- Quashquame
- Jim Thorpe

== See also ==
- Native American tribes
- Native American tribes in Nebraska
- Saginaw Trail
- Sauk Trail

== Notes ==
1. The name of the Sauk River in Washington State, however, comes from the Sah-kee-ma-hu (Sauk-Suiattle tribe), a group related to the Skagit tribes, not from the Sac tribe of the Midwestern U.S.
