= John B. Johnson House =

- U.S. National Register of Historic Places
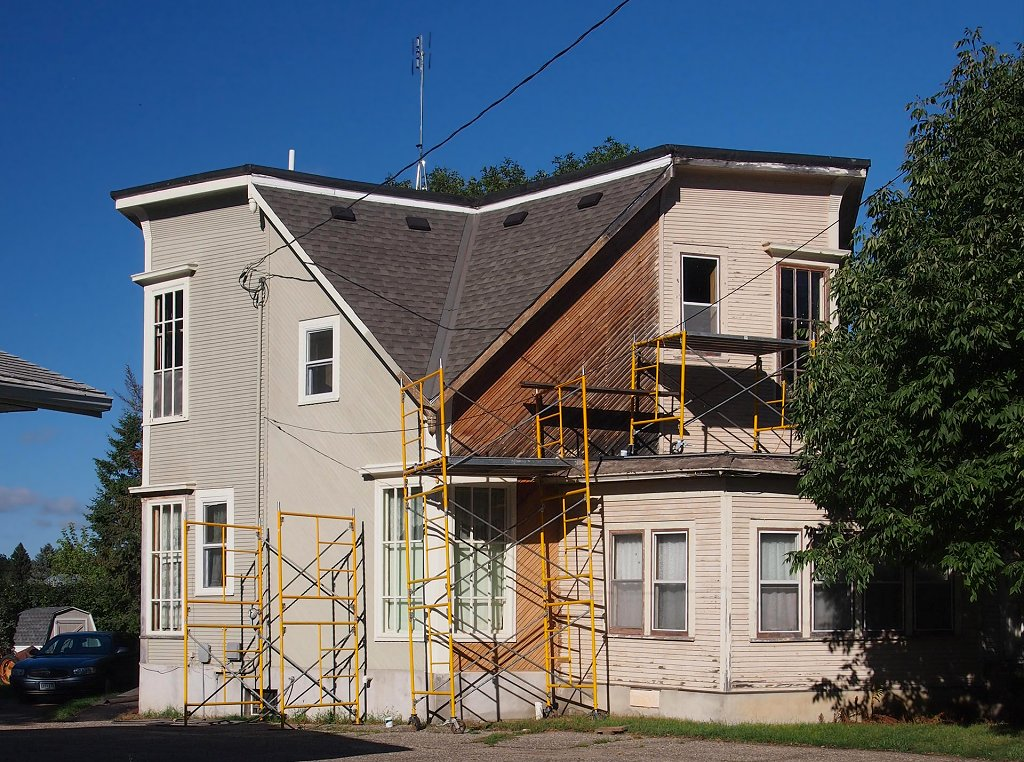
- House in renovation, 2013

- Location within Minnesota Location within the United States
- Location: U.S. Route 52, Osakis, Minnesota
- Coordinates: 45°52′02″N 95°08′59″W
- Built: 1886
- Architect: Great Northern Railway; Evenson, Earle & Aiton
- NRHP reference No.: 77000730
- Added to NRHP: December 9, 1977

The John B. Johnson House is a historic house located on East Nokomis Street in Osakis, Minnesota and registered in the National Register of Historic Places (NRHP).

== History and description ==
In 1876 John B. Johnson, one of the early pioneers of the Minnesota village of Osakis, moved with his wife into a new house, the most expensive house in the village. Johnson paid Theodore Halstad, originally from Maine, to build the two-storey, six-sided house. The house, now relocated, was originally sited on large grounds (now the location of the present Osakis High School). The original grounds were the size of a full city block and was enclosed by a big white fence.

In addition to its hexagonal shape, another striking feature of the two-storey house is an unusual roofline which plunges down to the first storey. The roofline has three rounded corners, lacking sharp angles, that appear to droop downward to the first storey. Other notable features are diagonal siding and pairs of matching windows that are eight feet tall. The house has cornice treatment and millwork in the Italianate style. The house has front and rear entry doors, both of which are double in arrangement. The front double-door is at the hexagon's front corner, the back double-door is at the hexagon's back corner, and the double-doors connect to the central hall which divides the floor plan of the first storey. The house's first floor consists of four rooms. The rooms open into a central hall, which bisects the floor plan from the house's front to rear. Each of the four rooms has five walls. On one side of the central hall is a double parlor, and on the hall's other side there are a dining room and a kitchen. The second floor is accessible only through a stairway in the rear vestibule of the central hall and has four bedrooms and a bathroom. All of the house's walls, except in the kitchen, have decorations with simple geometric stenciling.

Although many inhabitants of Osakis called the Johnson House, the "Cyclone House" based upon the belief that house was built to resist high winds, according to Clyde W. Long, John B. Johnson's nephew, the house was built with a hexagonal shape because of his uncle's admiration for honey bees and their geometric honeycombs. John B. Johnson always had an apiary in his yard and enjoyed studying the habits of honey bees.

For many years, the Johnson home was a showplace for Osakis. John B. Johnson and his wife, Rebecca "Nellie," gave large parties and bought beautiful, expensive furnishings for their house. In 1912, the Osakis School District purchased the John B. Johnson house and land for $7,000. While a new school was constructed, the house was used as a temporary building for the youngest elementary school students. In July 1915, the Osakis School District offered the house for sale with the option of taking the house without its lot. In 1916 Andrew B. Anderson bought the house without its lot and moved the structure to its present location. Anderson hired Verne Frey, a locator decorator, who worked for three months painting ad stenciling the house's interior. In 1976 the house, in a deteriorating condition, was sold at auction to Thomas J. G. Dunn, who in 1977 was successful in having the house placed on the National Register of Historic Places (NRHS).

In 1982 Roger and Nancy Daniels bought the house, opened a real estate office in the house's front porch, and began refurbishing the house for themselves and their children. The house in 1982 leaked badly during rain, had only five electrical outlets, and needed strengthening of its floors and ceilings. Roger and Nancy Daniels restored the original hardwood floor consisting of birdseye hard maple and maintained a consistent effort to restore the house to its original condition rather than make fundamentally new changes.

On February 25, 2005, the John B. Johnson House, as restored by Roger and Nancy Daniels, was featured in one of the segments on the program If Walls Could Talk, broadcast by HGTV (Home & Garden Television).

According to the polymath Roger G. Kennedy,

This a house which can be readily scorned by those whose interest runs toward pure derivations from accredited styles. It is no thing of beauty. But it manifests fertility of invention and freedom of expression, virtues which have validity quite apart from the things they produce. Like the octagon houses, it is a social document worthy of respect.

== John and Rebecca Johnson ==
John B. Johnson was born in 1841 in Woodstock, Ohio and in boyhood moved to Illinois with his family. After serving in the Union Army during the American Civil War, he moved in 1866 to Sauk Centre, Minnesota. In 1868 he and one of his cousins settled in Osakis and opened a trading post and general store. In 1872 John Johnson married Rebecca Fannehall. The first house of John and Rachel Johnson was destroyed by a tornado. She founded the first bank in Osakis and acted as the bank's manager and cashier. He operated a post office located inside the general store and invested in the grain business. He became the owner of the first grain elevator in Osakis.

The second house of John and Rebecca Johnson, now called the "John B. Johnson House", was a source of pride for the couple. A photograph of the house, in its pristine condition, was reproduced on the Bank of Osakis checks. In their home, the wealthy, influential couple entertained many friends. According to a local historian in Osakis, John and Rebecca Johnson, even in old age, rode a bicycle built for two. He died in 1937 and she died in 1940. Both are buried in a local cemetery.

== See also ==
- National Register of Historic Places listings in Douglas County, Minnesota
- Hexagon House
- Shay Hexagon House
