= Sauk River (Minnesota) =

River in Minnesota, United States

Coordinates: 45°35′30″N 94°10′36″W

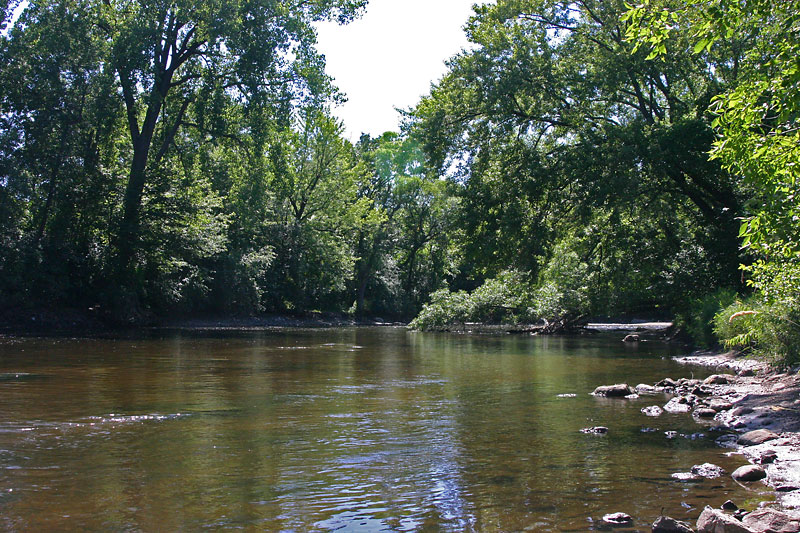
The Sauk River as it passes through St. Cloud, Minnesota

The Sauk River is a 122-mile-long (196 km) tributary of the Mississippi River in central Minnesota in the United States. It drains small lakes in Stearns County. In the Ojibwe language it is called Ozaagi-ziibi, meaning "River of the Sauks".

It issues from Lake Osakis on the Todd County / Stearns County line. During times of low water in Lake Osakis, water can be diverted into the lake across the divide from the Long Prairie River, joining the watershed of the Sauk River with that of the Crow Wing River. The Sauk River then flows east through Guernsey Lake, Little Sauk Lake and Juergens Lake, then south through Sauk Lake and past the city of Sauk Centre. The river continues southeast past Melrose and Richmond, then northeast through Cedar Island Lake and Zumwalde Lake, past Cold Spring and Waite Park, and discharges in to the Mississippi River 2 miles (3 km) north of St. Cloud.

At St. Cloud, MN, the river has a mean annual discharge of 342 cubic feet per second (9.7 m^{3}/s).

The rapids that occur south of the river's mouth on the Mississippi River lent their name to the nearby city of Sauk Rapids.

== History ==
In 1847, the Mississippi Chippewa ceded their lands about the Sauk River to the United States for the purpose of establishing a homeland for the Winnebagoes, who at the time were being removed out of Wisconsin. However, due to continued skirmishes between the Ojibwe (Chippewa) and the Dakota, the Winnebagoes were placed in constant danger. By their request, the United States relocated the Winnebagoes to south-central Minnesota, then to South Dakota and finally Nebraska. Some of the Winnebagoes, however, returned to Wisconsin despite their removal.

The river is named after the Sauk tribe, also called the Sac or Meskwaki, some of whom had come to the area (mostly settled by Sioux or Chippewa) after the Black Hawk War; this tribe now has concentrations in Iowa, Kansas, and Oklahoma. The wars between the Sioux and the Chippewa, spurred on by the French fur traders who often sided with the Chippewa, resulted in the establishment of a common hunting grounds to divert conflict between the tribes. This somewhat unsuccessful "neutral" area was bordered by the Crow River on the south and the Sauk on the north. Early interventions by the white man marked the ensuing decline of Indian populations in this area.

The fur traders were the first Europeans into this area, representatives of both the Hudson's Bay Company and French interests, pursuing the fur trade as early as the late 18th century. Abundant beaver and other fur types were paramount to these fur traders. The development of the Red River Valley and points in between Minneapolis – St. Paul and Winnipeg provided the first push for settlement in the area. By the late 1850s numerous settlements started to develop along the Sauk River and adjacent areas. The Red River Trails required various fording points across the river, and some of these sites are still visible today upon close inspection. Waite's Crossing near the Knights of Columbus Park in St. Cloud is marked by a commemorative stone explaining the existence of an important crossing at this point.

As increased settlement took place, fur trading took a backseat to agriculture and the logging industry that were becoming more important for the region. Logging of the hardwood forests soon became a vital interest, and the Sauk River provided a corridor for the passage of wood from western and central Stearns County to the rapidly developing St Cloud area. The granite industry likewise flourished with this growth, and the numerous granite outcrops along the river as well as many other sites in the county were obvious targets for exploitation of this resource. Prominent evidences of this industry still exist today along the Sauk as well as in the "Granite City" of St. Cloud.

Throughout this time, the development of a substantial agricultural economy provided for the development of mills along the Sauk. The river provided another resource to the area in this manner. With the advancement of railroads to the area, the small mills along the river declined in usefulness; however, evidence of these sites exist today along the river, with a large mill still operating where the Sauk enters the Mississippi.

In 1939, the Long Prairie River Diversion was completed between the watersheds of the Crow Wing and Sauk Rivers.

== Water characteristics ==
The Sauk enters the Mississippi River on the north end of St. Cloud, just above the Sauk Rapids of the Mississippi. Numerous waterfowl can be seen in state-managed wildlife areas as the river winds along this section. The river then begins to broaden its banks and deepen its valleys as its course continues. Midway along its path, near Richmond, the river forms a "Chain of Lakes" where more than 80 miles of continuous shoreline are encountered over a river length of less than 8 miles. As the river continues, a variety of granite outcrops and small hills provide a scenic landscape along the shores. Near St Cloud, the river gradient increases and a series of rapids occur until the river joins with the Mississippi.

== Vegetation ==
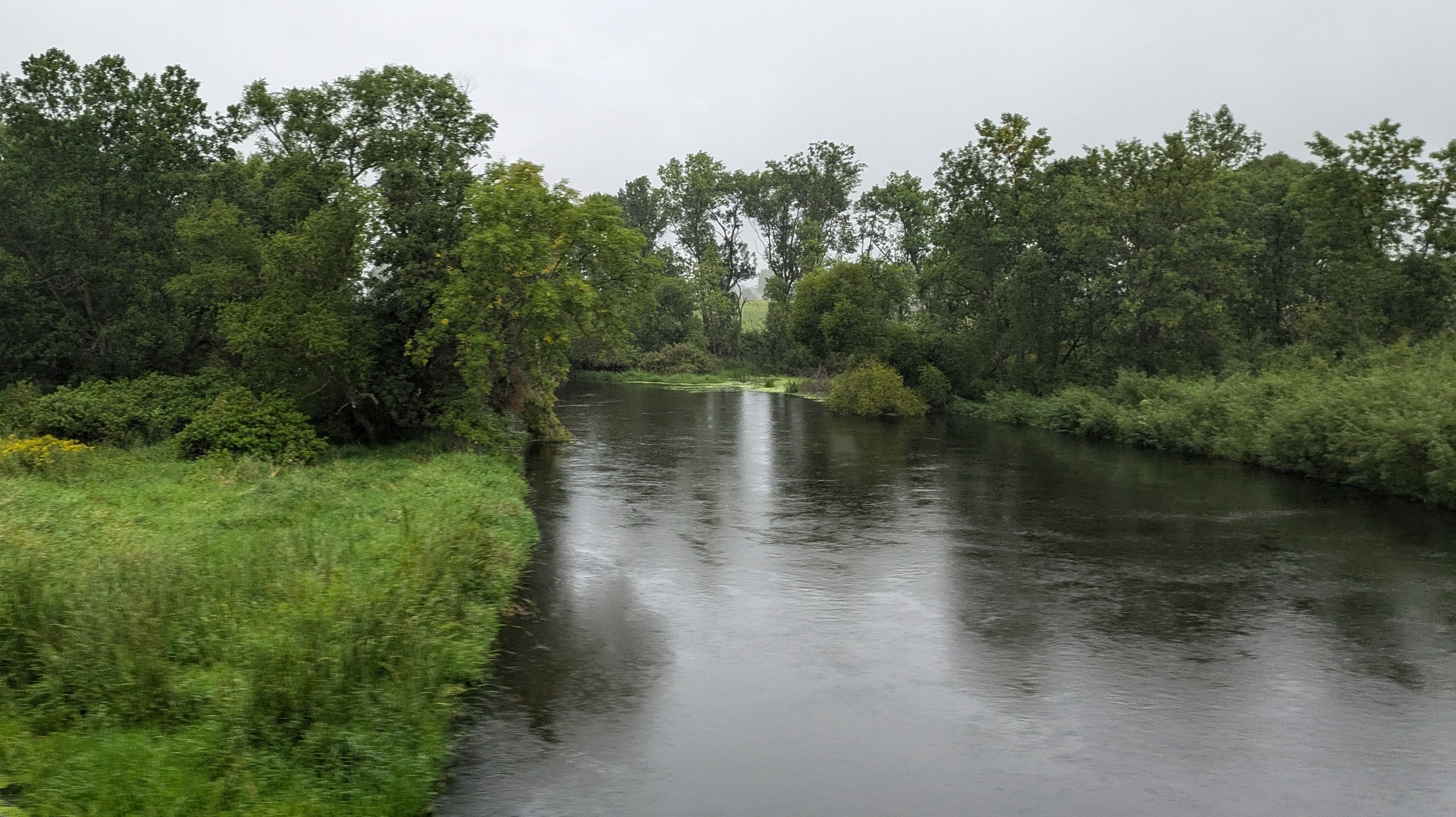
The Sauk River

A variety of plant life is found along the Sauk River, ranging from naturally restored prairie grasslands to thick hardwood forests. The river starts in flat swamp vegetation with flora common to most Minnesota wetlands. Prairie-type grasses and flowers are then encountered on the banks and fields above the river. Near the Spring Hill County Park, a naturally restored prairie field is preserved. Oaks, elms, silver maples and willows are the most common trees through most of the valley. One of the most interesting sights along the Sauk is an elevated tamarack bog on the north bank of the river near Rockville, providing beautiful golden scenery in the fall.

== Wildlife ==
Abundant waterfowl are found in and around two state managed wildlife areas south of Sauk Centre. The marshy swampland that borders the river is prime habitat for a variety of waterfowl. Early in the morning, it is possible to see deer feeding along the river in some wooded areas. Gray fox, red squirrels, and chipmunks are common in the wooded sections, along with an occasional woodchuck, muskrat, or beaver. There have been sightings of such less common animals as otter and mink.

A variety of birdlife in the Sauk Valley makes for very interesting bird watching. The forests and grasslands are home to most of the birds native to central Minnesota. Cardinals, woodpeckers and many songbirds are common. Grouse, pheasant and partridge are some of the more popular gamebirds found near the Sauk. Birds of prey such as various hawks, owls and an occasional bald eagle can also be seen when canoeing the river. Along most of the river it is common to see great blue herons.

== Fish ==
Because of the shallow depth of the river and the somewhat poor water quality, game fish are not abundant in the Sauk River. Redhorse and sucker are found in most parts of the river. However, in the "Chain of Lakes" area, fishing is very popular with a variety of fish being caught. Panfish, walleye and northern are the most common to anglers in this area. Walleye and northern can also be found where the river enters the Mississippi. The world record Greater redhorse was caught in the Sauk in 2005.

== Expeditions ==
In June, 2011 Todd Foster and Scott Miller paddled the entire length of the Sauk River. The trip was made to chronicle fences along the river, as well as to highlight the Friends of the Sauk River canoe library, and to promote getting outside and paddling the river. Their trip was chronicled at http://paddlethesauk.weebly.com

== See also ==
- List of rivers of Minnesota
