= Motley, Minnesota =

City in Minnesota, United States

- City
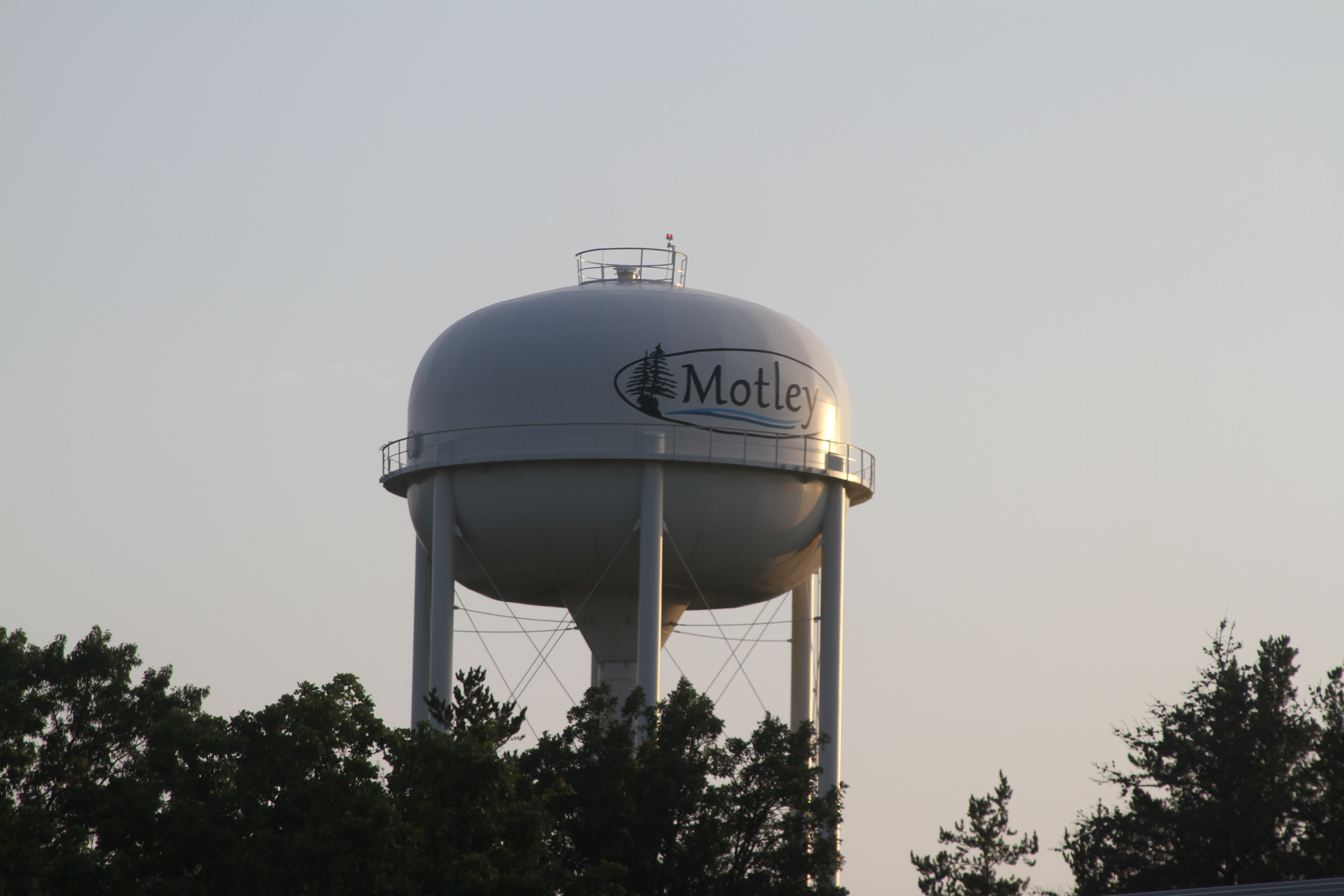
- Water tower

- Location in Morrison County and the state of Minnesota
- Coordinates: 46°20′06″N 94°38′33″W
- Country: United States
- State: Minnesota
- Counties: Morrison, Cass

Government
  - Mayor: Pat O'Regan

Area
  - Total: 1.45 sq mi (3.75 km^{2})
  - Land: 1.39 sq mi (3.60 km^{2})
  - Water: 0.062 sq mi (0.16 km^{2})
- Elevation: 1,227 ft (374 m)

Population (2020)
  - Total: 680
  - Density: 490/sq mi (189.1/km^{2})
- Time zone: UTC-6 (Central (CST))
  - Summer (DST): UTC-5 (CDT)
- ZIP code: 56466
- Area code: 218
- FIPS code: 27-44422
- GNIS feature ID: 2395418
- Website: www.cityofmotley.com

Motley is a city in Morrison and Cass Counties in the U.S. state of Minnesota. The population was 680 at the 2020 census. Most of Motley is in Morrison County, with a small part extending into Cass County.

The Cass County portion of Motley is part of the Brainerd Micropolitan Statistical Area.

== History ==
Motley was laid out in 1874. A post office has been in operation at Motley since 1873.

In 1881, the Northern Pacific Railway built a 20-by-40-foot (6.1 by 12.2 m) passenger station on the east side of 2nd Street (between Front Street and Main Street) and a 24-by-60-foot (7.3 by 18.3 m) freight depot on the west side of 2nd Street. A spur line ran south from the mainline along 4th Avenue to a planing mill on the bank of the Long Prairie River (just south of Cemetery Road). The spur line was removed by 1920.

== Geography ==
Motley is in the northwest corner of Morrison County, with a small portion extending east into Cass County. The city is bordered to the south by Motley Township in Morrison County, to the east and north by May Township in Cass County, and to the west by Villard Township in Todd County.

U.S. Highway 10 and Minnesota State Highways 64 and 210 are three of the main routes in the city. US 10 leads southeast 30 miles (48 km) to Little Falls, the Morrison county seat, and west-northwest 25 miles (40 km) to Wadena. Highway 210 leads east 22 miles (35 km) to Brainerd; it departs westward from the city with US 10, but splits off to lead west 22 miles (35 km) to Hewitt. Highway 64 leads north from Motley 49 miles (79 km) to Akeley.

According to the U.S. Census Bureau, Motley has an area of 1.45 square miles (3.76 km^{2}), of which 1.39 square miles (3.60 km^{2}) is land and 0.06 square miles (0.16 km^{2}), or 4.21%, is water. The Crow Wing River, which forms the Morrison–Cass County line, passes through Motley north and east of the city center, flowing easterly to join the Mississippi River southwest of Brainerd. The Long Prairie River, an east-flowing tributary of the Crow Wing, forms part of the southwest border of the city.

== Demographics ==
Historical population
Census	Pop.	Note	%±
1880	199		—
1890	525		163.8%
1900	404		−23.0%
1910	428		5.9%
1920	396		−7.5%
1930	397		0.3%
1940	368		−7.3%
1950	435		18.2%
1960	430		−1.1%
1970	351		−18.4%
1980	444		26.5%
1990	441		−0.7%
2000	585		32.7%
2010	671		14.7%
2020	680		1.3%
U.S. Decennial Census

=== 2010 census ===
As of the census of 2010, there were 671 people, 305 households, and 167 families living in the city. The population density was 504.5 inhabitants per square mile (194.8/km^{2}). There were 338 housing units at an average density of 254.1 per square mile (98.1/km^{2}). The racial makeup of the city was 94.5% White, 0.1% African American, 0.4% Native American, 1.6% from other races, and 3.3% from two or more races. Hispanic or Latino of any race were 4.3% of the population.

There were 305 households, of which 26.9% had children under the age of 18 living with them, 36.7% were married couples living together, 14.8% had a female householder with no husband present, 3.3% had a male householder with no wife present, and 45.2% were non-families. 38.7% of all households were made up of individuals, and 17.1% had someone living alone who was 65 years of age or older. The average household size was 2.20 and the average family size was 2.90.

The median age in the city was 41.1 years. 23.5% of residents were under the age of 18; 10.1% were between the ages of 18 and 24; 19.7% were from 25 to 44; 25.1% were from 45 to 64; and 21.6% were 65 years of age or older. The gender makeup of the city was 48.6% male and 51.4% female.

=== 2000 census ===
As of the census of 2000, there were 585 people, 258 households, and 167 families living in the city. The population density was 442.7 inhabitants per square mile (170.9/km^{2}). There were 270 housing units at an average density of 204.3 per square mile (78.9/km^{2}). The racial makeup of the city was 97.95% White, 0.17% African American, 0.17% Native American, 0.34% Asian, 0.17% from other races, and 1.20% from two or more races. Hispanic or Latino of any race were 2.05% of the population.

There were 258 households, out of which 31.8% had children under the age of 18 living with them, 40.7% were married couples living together, 19.0% had a female householder with no husband present, and 34.9% were non-families. 31.0% of all households were made up of individuals, and 16.3% had someone living alone who was 65 years of age or older. The average household size was 2.25 and the average family size was 2.73.

In the city, the population was spread out, with 27.7% under the age of 18, 10.8% from 18 to 24, 24.8% from 25 to 44, 18.6% from 45 to 64, and 18.1% who were 65 years of age or older. The median age was 33 years. For every 100 females, there were 82.2 males. For every 100 females age 18 and over, there were 75.5 males.

The median income for a household in the city was $23,438, and the median income for a family was $29,659. Males had a median income of $24,063 versus $18,824 for females. The per capita income was $12,220. About 19.2% of families and 18.9% of the population were below the poverty line, including 31.9% of those under age 18 and 17.1% of those age 65 or over.

== Gallery ==
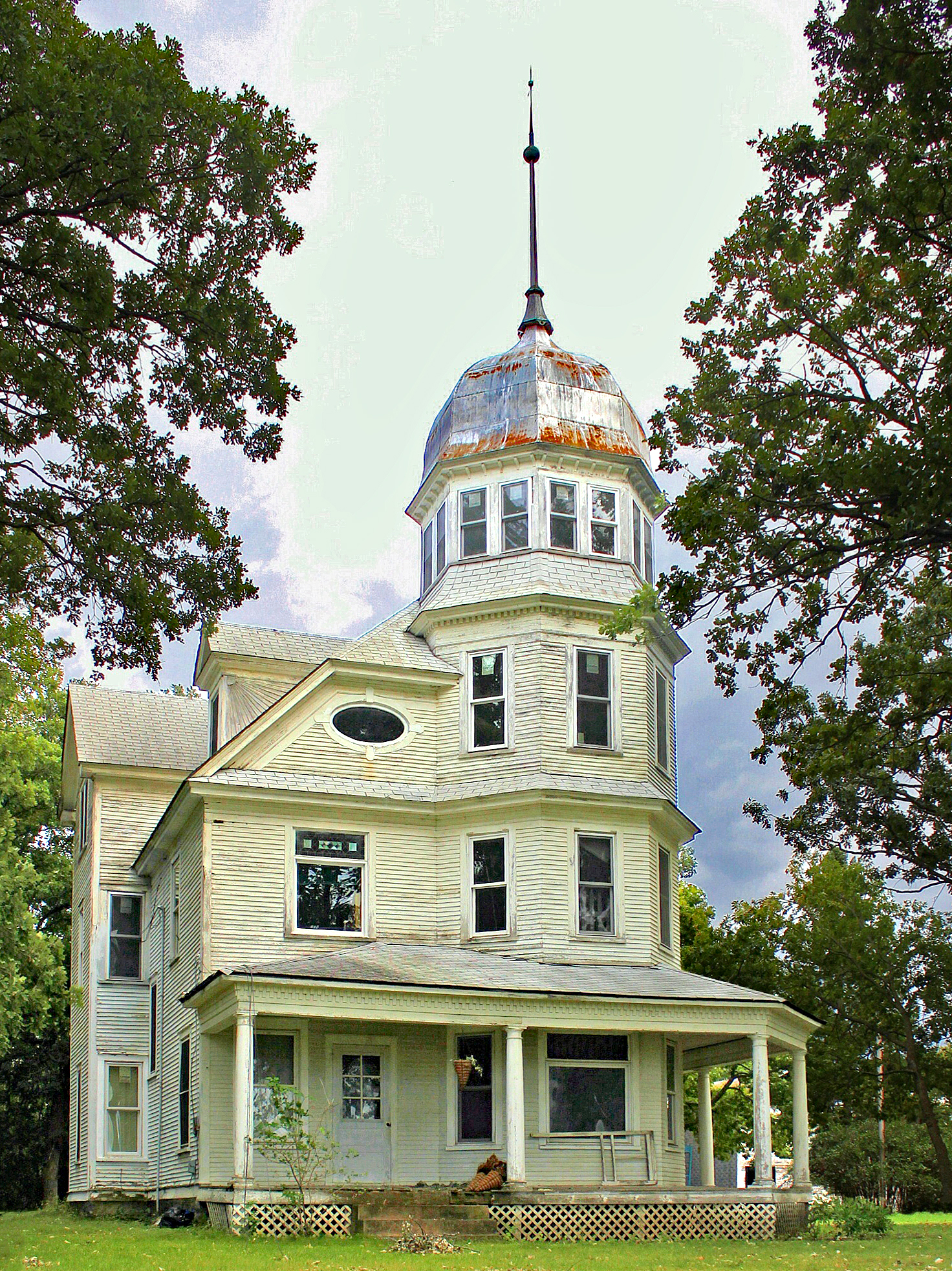
Almond A. White House

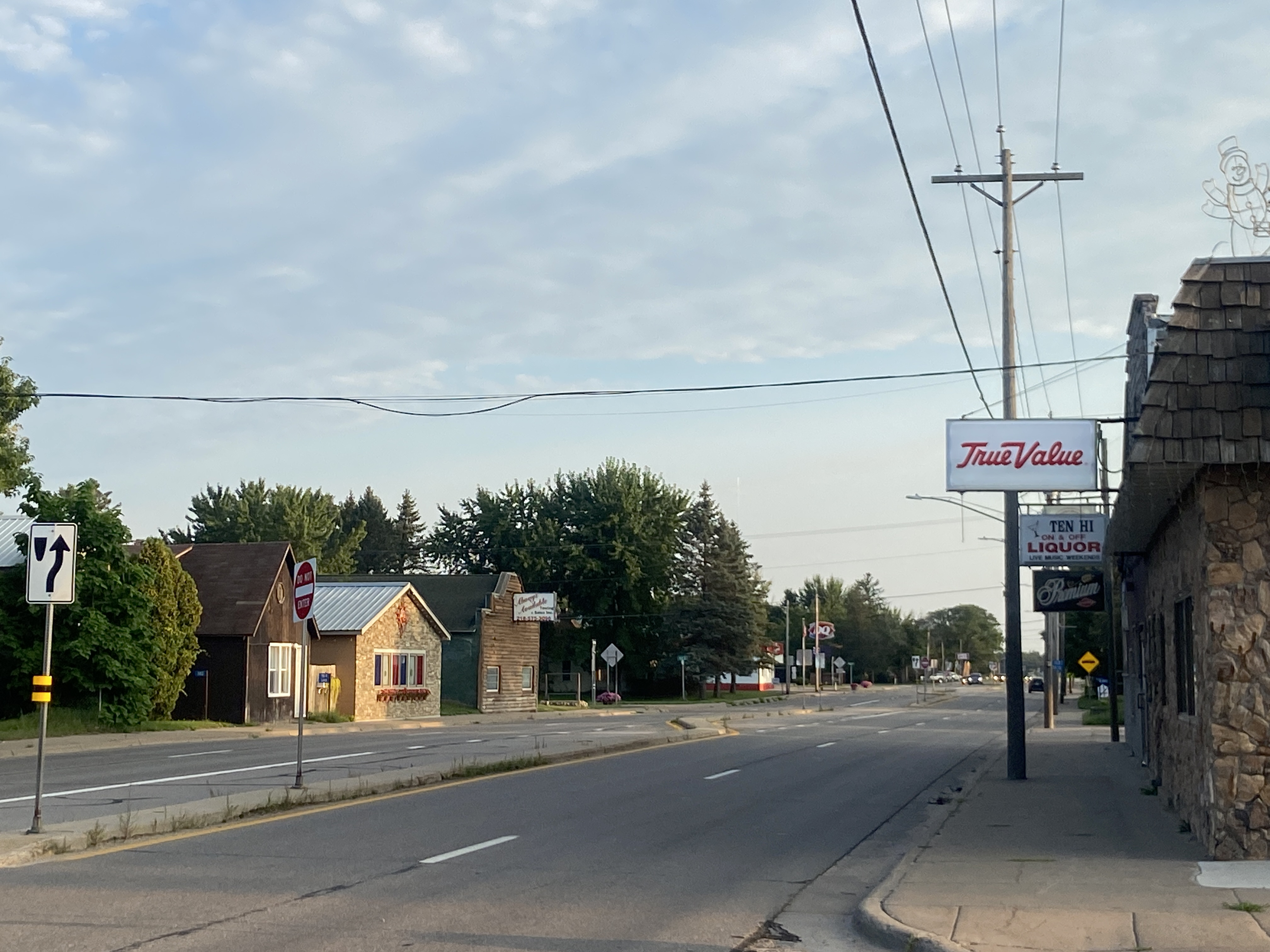
Hwy 10 at Beaulieu Street, looking south

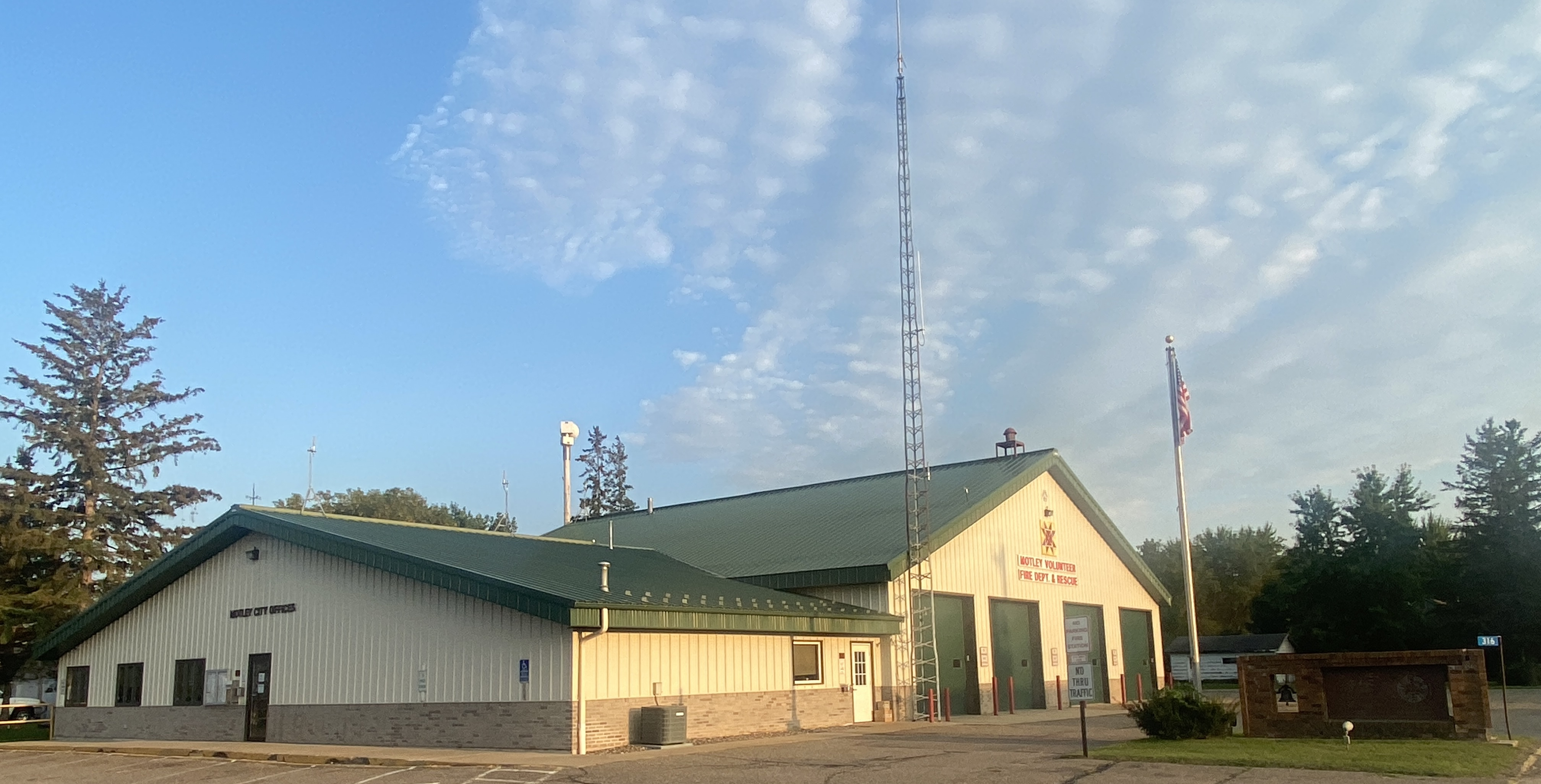
Fire Department

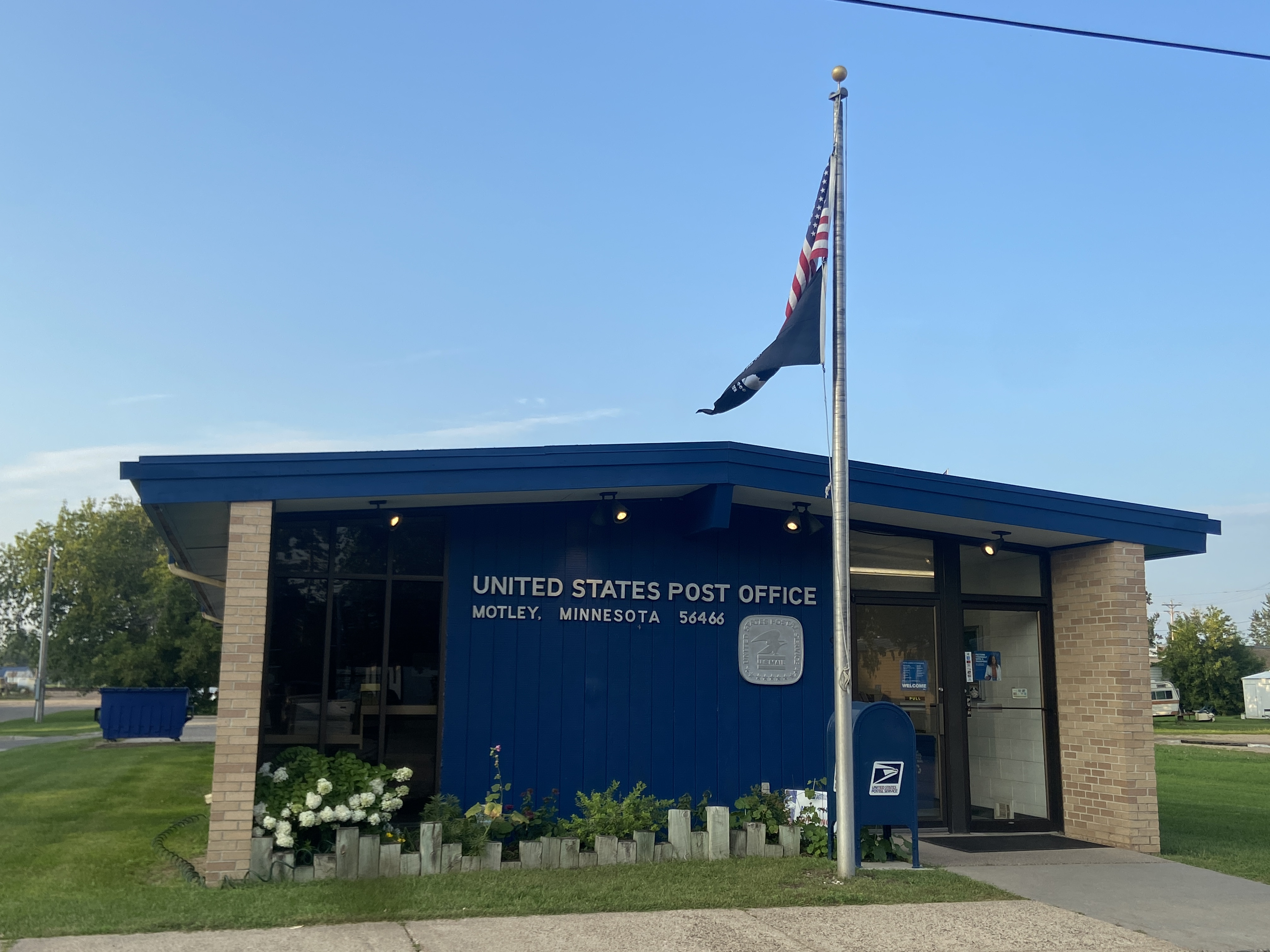
Post Office
