= Almond A. White House =

- U.S. National Register of Historic Places
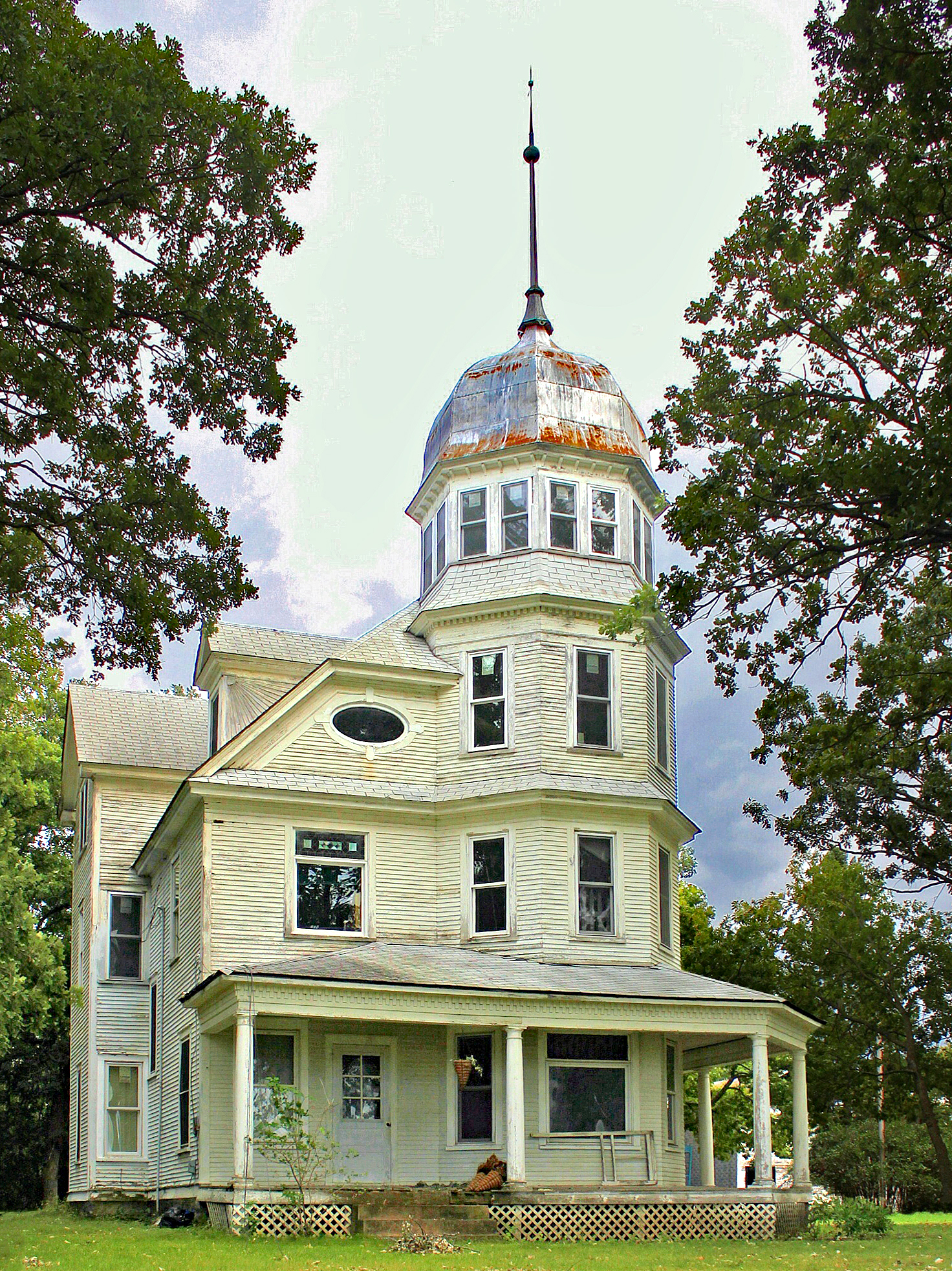
- Front of the house

- Location within Minnesota Location within the United States
- Interactive map showing the location of Almond A. White House
- Location: Cleveland and Beaulieu Sts., Motley, Minnesota
- Coordinates: 46°20′11″N 94°38′27″W
- Area: 2.7 acres (1.1 ha)
- Built: 1902
- Architectural style: Queen Anne
- NRHP reference No.: 86000330
- Added to NRHP: March 13, 1986

The Almond A. White House is a historic house in Motley, Minnesota. Built in 1902, the Queen Anne architecture is unique compared to other buildings in the town, and locally, it is referred to as the Motley Castle. Believed to be built as a rural retreat for Mr. A.A. White, a lumber businessman, the house remains a showplace in Motley, and was added to the National Register of Historic Places on March 13, 1986.

== Description ==
From the official nomination form:

The A. A. White House is located at the edge of a residential area on the east side of Motley, Minnesota. The house faces west at the front of a wooded site. A garage, storage shed, and a barn are located east of the house, and are reached by a driveway passing along the south side of the house. The house is Queen Anne in style. It contains two stories and a large attic, and is rectangular in plan, measuring about twenty by forty feet. A prominent octagonal bellcast-roofed tower is placed at the southwest corner. A porch wraps from the front of the house to the projecting dining room bay on the south side. Clapboard siding is the primary exterior material. The octagonal corner tower is the most visually prominent feature of the house. It rises four stories, and has a sunroom on its top floor. The bellcast roof is clad with metal. Crowning the tower is an iron finial, or lightning rod, which rises approximately ten feet above the tower's roof. The open porch is another prominent feature, and has Tuscan columns, a dentilled cornice, and pediments to signify the main entry at the northwest corner of the house and a side entry on the south side. Bays that project out from the north and south sides break the rectangular plan. These bays extend up to the attic level, where they are covered by gabled roof sections. The first floor contains a parlor, library, dining room, and the kitchen. A summer kitchen is located in a hip roofed extension on the rear of the house. Bedrooms are located on the second floor. The attic is also divided into rooms, which are lit by windows in the ends of the gables, the tower, and several dormers on the north slope of the roof. A keyed oval window is placed in the front facing gable end. Most windows in the house have double hung sash. Major rooms have larger, fixed sash windows, which have upper lights of colored glass. The foundation is of cut fieldstone. Centered at the top course of the foundation stone on the dining room bay is a block inscribed with the initials "A. W." and the date "1902". The house has been well-maintained. The replacement of the original wood shingles by asphalt shingles appears to have been the only exterior alteration.
