= Motley Township, Morrison County, Minnesota =

Motley Township, Minnesota
- Township
- Location within the state of Minnesota Motley Township, Minnesota (the United States)
- Coordinates: 46°18′22″N 94°35′29″W
- Country: United States
- State: Minnesota
- County: Morrison

Government
  - Mayor: Jayde Jordahl

Area
  - Total: 15.9 sq mi (41.2 km^{2})
  - Land: 15.3 sq mi (39.6 km^{2})
  - Water: 0.58 sq mi (1.5 km^{2})
- Elevation: 1,227 ft (374 m)

Population (2000)
  - Total: 205
  - Density: 13/sq mi (5.2/km^{2})
- Time zone: UTC-6 (Central (CST))
  - Summer (DST): UTC-5 (CDT)
- ZIP code: 56466
- Area code: 218
- FIPS code: 27-44440
- GNIS feature ID: 0665047
- Website: https://www.motleytownship.com/

Motley Township is a township in Morrison County, Minnesota, United States. The population was 205 at the 2000 census.

Motley Township was organized in 1879, and named after Motley, Minnesota.

== Geography ==
According to the United States Census Bureau, the township has a total area of 15.9 square miles (41.2 km^{2}), of which 15.3 square miles (39.7 km^{2}) is land and 0.6 square mile (1.5 km^{2}) (3.65%) is water. The northern boundary of the township is defined by the Crow Wing River; the Long Prairie River, a tributary of the Crow Wing, flows through the northwestern part of the township.

== Demographics ==
As of the census of 2000, there were 205 people, 79 households, and 59 families residing in the township. The population density was 13.4 people per square mile (5.2/km^{2}). There were 98 housing units at an average density of 6.4/sq mi (2.5/km^{2}). The racial makeup of the township was 100.00% White.

There were 79 households, out of which 30.4% had children under the age of 18 living with them, 63.3% were married couples living together, 6.3% had a female householder with no husband present, and 24.1% were non-families. 19.0% of all households were made up of individuals, and 10.1% had someone living alone who was 65 years of age or older. The average household size was 2.48 and the average family size was 2.75.

In the township the population was spread out, with 22.4% under the age of 18, 6.3% from 18 to 24, 23.9% from 25 to 44, 27.8% from 45 to 64, and 19.5% who were 65 years of age or older. The median age was 44 years. For every 100 females, there were 86.4 males. For every 100 females age 18 and over, there were 87.1 males.

The median income for a household in the township was $39,000, and the median income for a family was $38,333. Males had a median income of $35,000 versus $17,500 for females. The per capita income for the township was $15,873. About 13.0% of families and 18.4% of the population were below the poverty line, including 31.6% of those under the age of eighteen and 25.0% of those 65 or over.
