= Lake Osakis =

Lake in the state of Minnesota, United States

- Location within Minnesota Location within the United States
- Location: Todd / Douglas counties, Minnesota, United States
- Coordinates: 45.8967°N 95.1222°W
- Type: prairie lake
- Primary inflows: Bull Creek, numerous unnamed streams and wetlands
- Primary outflows: Sauk River
- Basin countries: United States
- Surface area: 6,270 acres (25.4 km^{2})
- Max. depth: 73 ft (22 m)
- Settlements: Osakis, Minnesota

Lake Osakis is a lake in Todd and Douglas counties in west-central Minnesota. The town of Osakis is situated on the southwest shore of the lake.

== Name ==
The lake received its English name by translation from the Ojibwe Ozaagi-zaaga'igan, meaning "the Sauk's Lake. The lake is supposed to have received its name due to a historical association with a small group of Sauks who, having been banished from their tribe for murder, made camp on the shores of Lake Osakis. According to Ojibwa oral tradition, these five Sauks were massacred by local Dakota Indians in the late 18th century.

== Description ==
Osakis is a large prairie lake, with a surface area of 6,270 acres (25.4 km^{2}) and a maximum depth of 73 feet (22 m). It is 11 miles long and 3.5 miles across at its widest, with 26.8 miles of shoreline and is located in Todd and Douglas counties. It is the 35th largest lake in Minnesota.

Osakis is the headwaters of the Sauk River watershed, having a naturally occurring but now human-controlled outflow on the east side of the lake. During times of low water in Lake Osakis, or high water in the Long Prairie River, water can be diverted from the Long Prairie into Lake Osakis by a canal between the two watersheds.

Gamefish present in the lake include black crappie, bluegill, largemouth bass, northern pike, pumpkinseed, smallmouth bass, walleye, and yellow perch. Osakis is an exceptional walleye lake; it has long been known as the "Mother Lake" because the Minnesota Department of Natural Resources uses a fishtrap on Bull Creek to obtain milt and eggs from walleyes for use in breeding and stocking programs. In addition to the above-mentioned gamefish, Lake Osakis has large populations of black bullhead, dogfish, brown bullhead, and tullibee, also known as "cisco." Some common carp are also present in the lake, however carp are an exotic species and their presence in the lake is not desirable. Lake Osakis produced the current Minnesota state records for Bluegill sunfish (1 lb, 13 oz) and Yellow Bullhead (3 lbs, 10 oz).

Highlighting its popularity as a destination and its importance to the tourist industry, Osakis has four public boat launches, three of which are improved, at the north, east, northwest, and south shores.
