= Leif Enger =

American author

Leif Enger is an American author who wrote the novel Peace Like a River.

== Early life ==
Enger was born in 1961 and was raised in Osakis, Minnesota. His parents were teachers. He attended Minnesota State University Moorhead, majoring in English and mass communication.

== Career ==
Enger worked as a reporter and producer for Minnesota Public Radio from 1984 until the sale of Peace Like a River, which won awards including the Alex Award from the American Library Association. In the early 1990s, he and his older brother, Lin, writing under the pen name L.L. Enger, produced a series of mystery novels featuring a retired baseball player.

His second solo novel, So Brave, Young, and Handsome appeared in May 2008.

In October 2018, his third novel, Virgil Wander, was published by Grove Press.

His fourth novel, I Cheerfully Refuse, published April 2024, also by Grove Press.

== Personal life ==
Enger met his wife Robin at Moorhead State. They moved to a rural farm outside Aitkin, Minnesota to raise their two sons. When his children were grown, he and his wife moved to Duluth in 2018.
