= Bell roof =

A bell roof (bell-shaped roof, ogee roof, Philibert de l'Orme roof) is a roof form resembling the shape of a bell.

== Shapes ==
Bell roofs may be round, multi-sided or square. A similar-sounding feature added to other roof forms at the eaves or walls is bell-cast, sprocketed or flared eaves, the roof flairs upward resembling the common shape of the bottom of a bell.

== Gallery ==
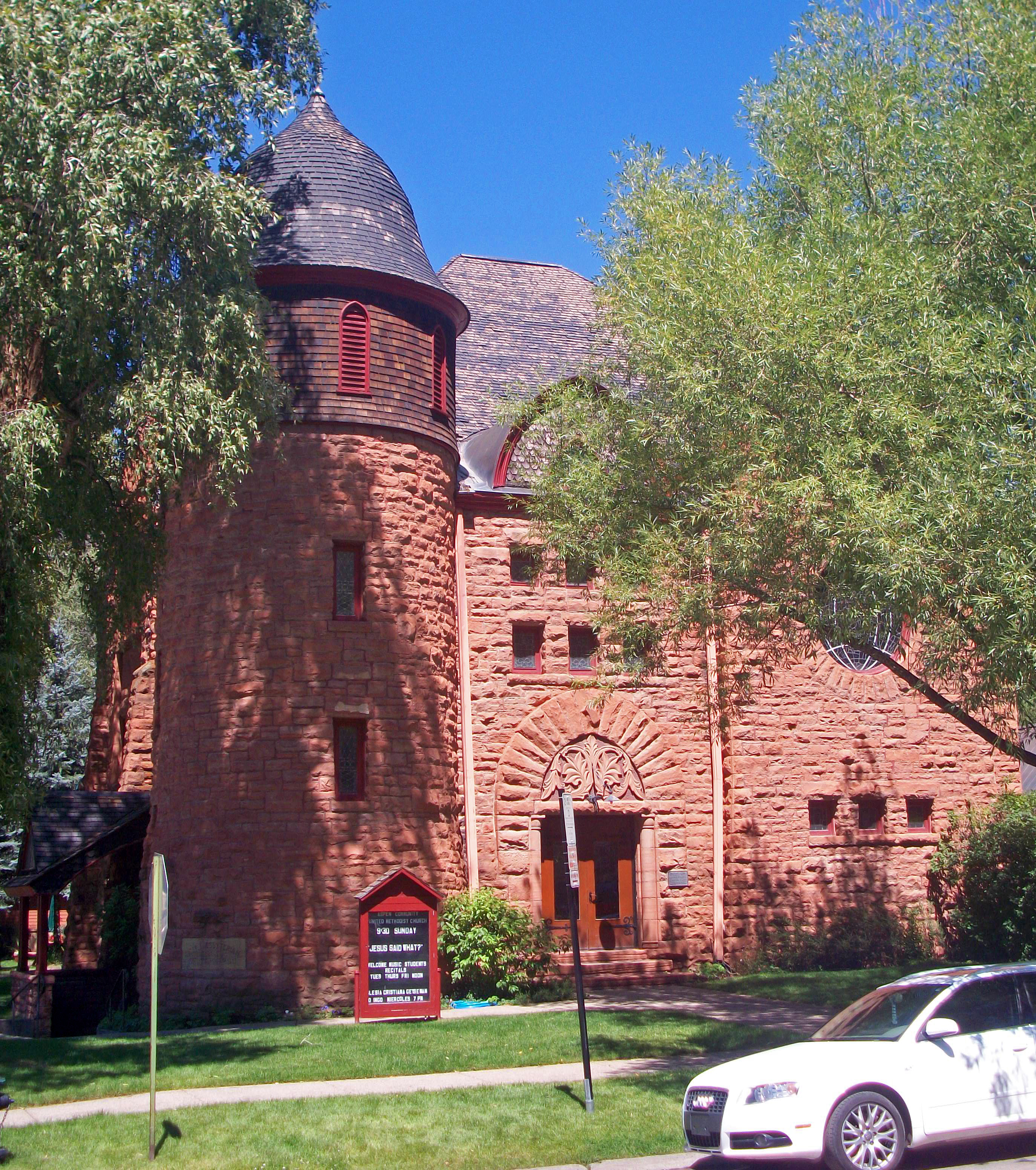
A classic, round bell roof on the round tower of Aspen Community Church in the USA

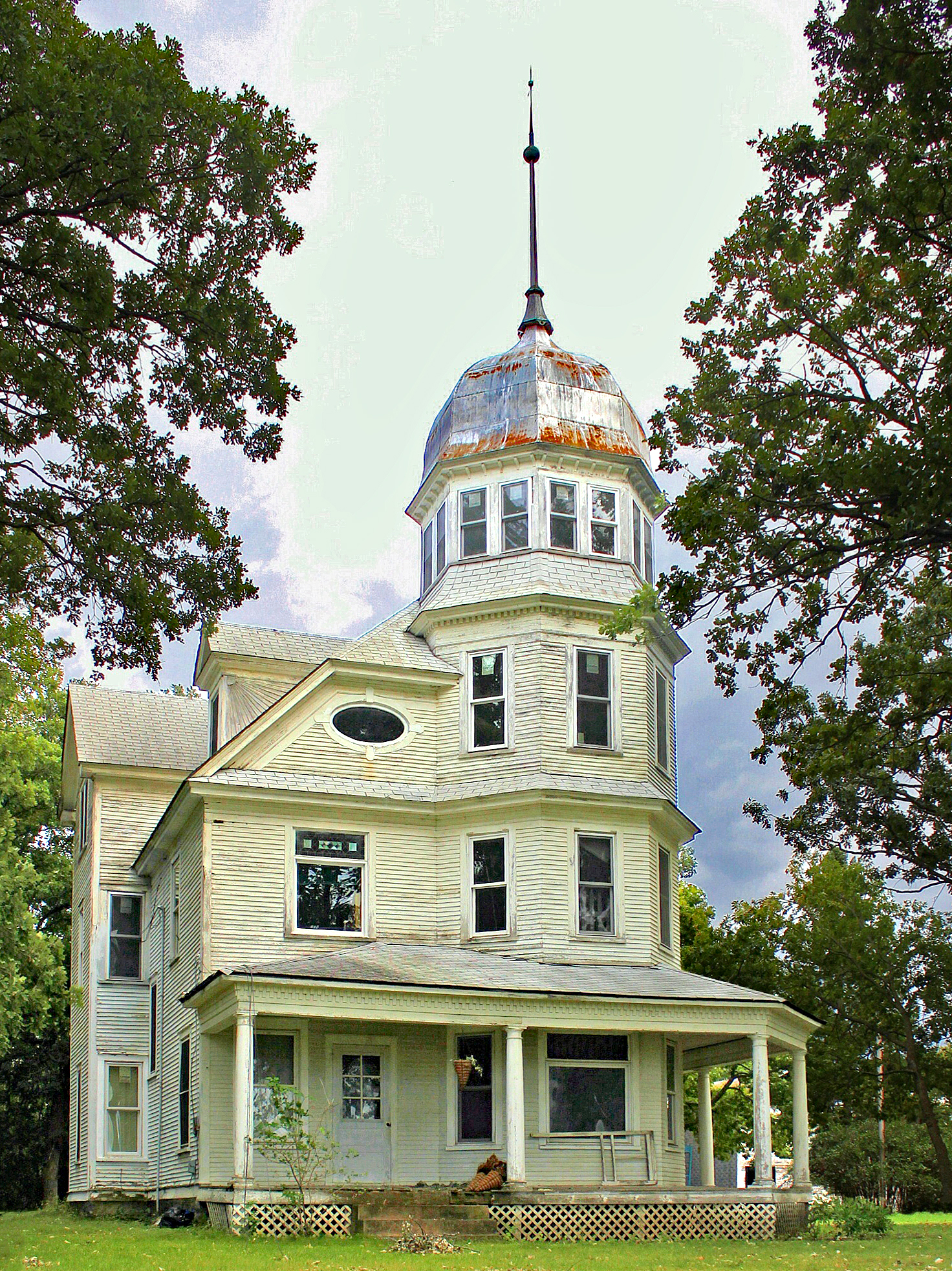
A metal bell roof on the Almond A. White House in the United States

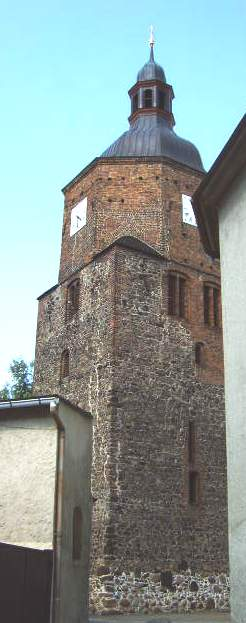
A multi-sided bell roof on the tower of the Wendish-German double church in Germany

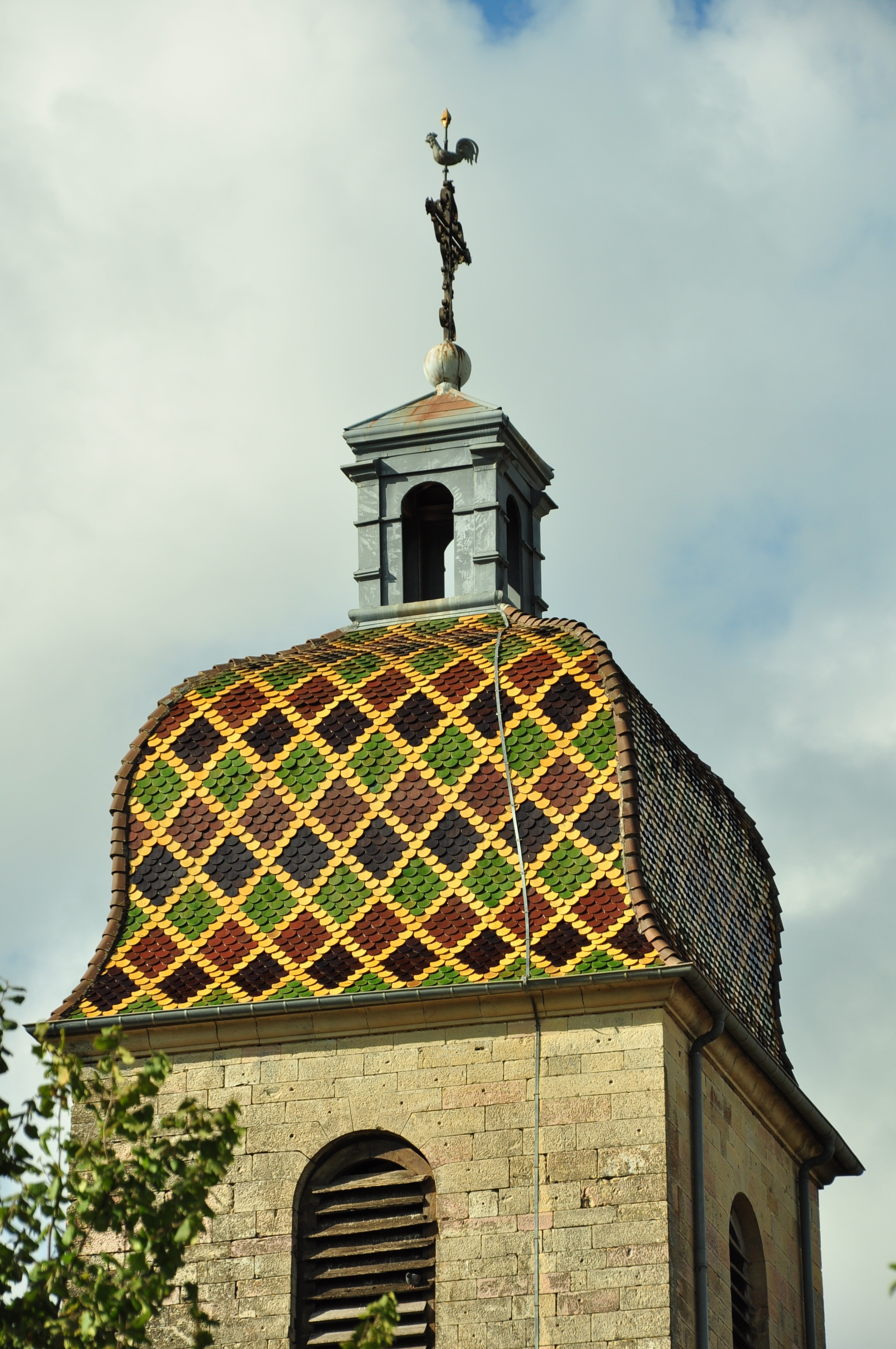
A square bell roof in France

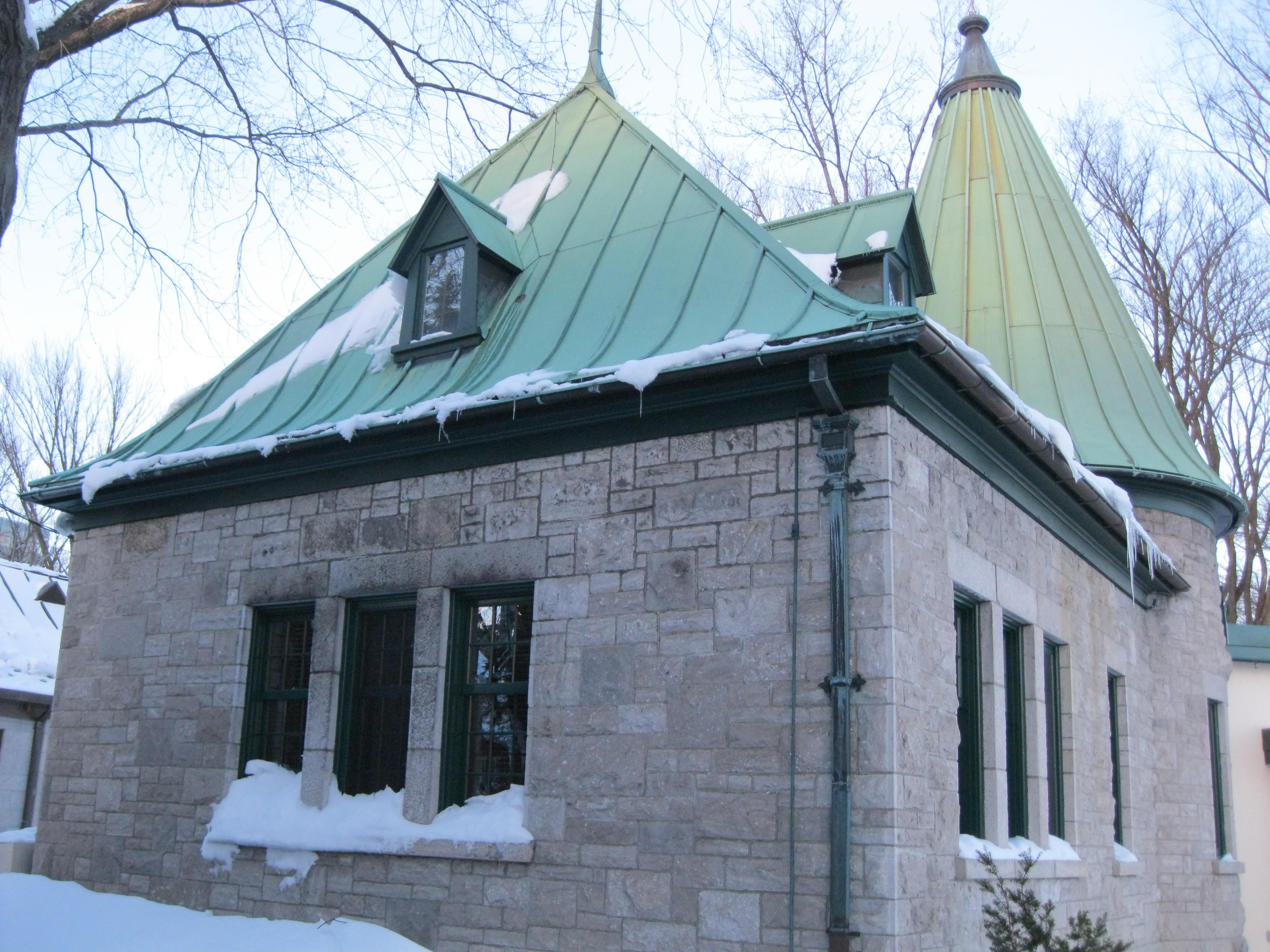
Not bell roofs but roofs with bell-cast eaves.

== See also ==
- Roof pitch
- Bochka roof
