= Carlos, Minnesota =

City in Minnesota, United States

Carlos
- City
- Location of Carlos, Minnesota
- Coordinates: 45°58′25″N 95°17′32″W
- Country: United States
- State: Minnesota
- County: Douglas

Area
  - Total: 0.45 sq mi (1.16 km^{2})
  - Land: 0.45 sq mi (1.16 km^{2})
  - Water: 0 sq mi (0.00 km^{2})
- Elevation: 1,368 ft (417 m)

Population (2020)
  - Total: 497
  - Density: 1,112.9/sq mi (429.68/km^{2})
- Time zone: UTC-6 (Central (CST))
  - Summer (DST): UTC-5 (CDT)
- ZIP code: 56319
- Area code: 320
- FIPS code: 27-09964
- GNIS feature ID: 2393746
- Website: cityofcarlos.com

Carlos is a city in Douglas County, Minnesota, United States. The population was 497 at the 2020 census.

== History ==
The city of Carlos was incorporated in 1904. Carlos Township, which predates the city, was named after Lake Carlos.

== Geography ==
According to the United States Census Bureau, the city has a total area of 0.45 square miles (1.17 km^{2}), all land.

Minnesota State Highway 29 and County Highway 13 are two of the main routes in the community.

== Demographics ==
Historical population
Census	Pop.	Note	%±
1910	167		—
1920	208		24.6%
1930	178		−14.4%
1940	187		5.1%
1950	233		24.6%
1960	262		12.4%
1970	278		6.1%
1980	364		30.9%
1990	361		−0.8%
2000	329		−8.9%
2010	502		52.6%
2020	497		−1.0%
U.S. Decennial Census; 2020 Census

=== 2010 census ===
As of the census of 2010, there were 502 people, 198 households, and 137 families residing in the city. The population density was 1,115.6 inhabitants per square mile (430.7/km^{2}). There were 215 housing units at an average density of 477.8 per square mile (184.5/km^{2}). The racial makeup of the city was 99.0% White, 0.8% African American, and 0.2% from two or more races. Hispanic or Latino of any race were 0.4% of the population.

There were 198 households, of which 41.4% had children under the age of 18 living with them, 49.0% were married couples living together, 12.1% had a female householder with no husband present, 8.1% had a male householder with no wife present, and 30.8% were non-families. 25.8% of all households were made up of individuals, and 9.1% had someone living alone who was 65 years of age or older. The average household size was 2.53 and the average family size was 3.00.

The median age in the city was 32.3 years. 28.3% of residents were under the age of 18; 8.9% were between the ages of 18 and 24; 32.4% were from 25 to 44; 20.6% were from 45 to 64; and 10.2% were 65 years of age or older. The gender makeup of the city was 51.2% male and 48.8% female.

=== 2000 census ===
As of the census of 2000, there were 329 people, 140 households, and 89 families residing in the city. The population density was 702.3 inhabitants per square mile (271.2/km^{2}). There were 153 housing units at an average density of 326.6 per square mile (126.1/km^{2}). The racial makeup of the city was 99.09% White, 0.61% African American and 0.30% Asian.

There were 140 households, out of which 29.3% had children under the age of 18 living with them, 53.6% were married couples living together, 7.9% had a female householder with no husband present, and 36.4% were non-families. 29.3% of all households were made up of individuals, and 13.6% had someone living alone who was 65 years of age or older. The average household size was 2.32 and the average family size was 2.88.

In the city, the population was spread out, with 22.2% under the age of 18, 12.5% from 18 to 24, 26.7% from 25 to 44, 21.6% from 45 to 64, and 17.0% who were 65 years of age or older. The median age was 37 years. For every 100 females, there were 109.6 males. For every 100 females age 18 and over, there were 101.6 males.

The median income for a household in the city was $38,125, and the median income for a family was $44,250. Males had a median income of $22,283 versus $19,250 for females. The per capita income for the city was $21,495. None of the families and 4.4% of the population were living below the poverty line, including no under eighteens and 5.3% of those over 64.
