= Osakis, Minnesota =

City in Minnesota, United States

Osakis
- City
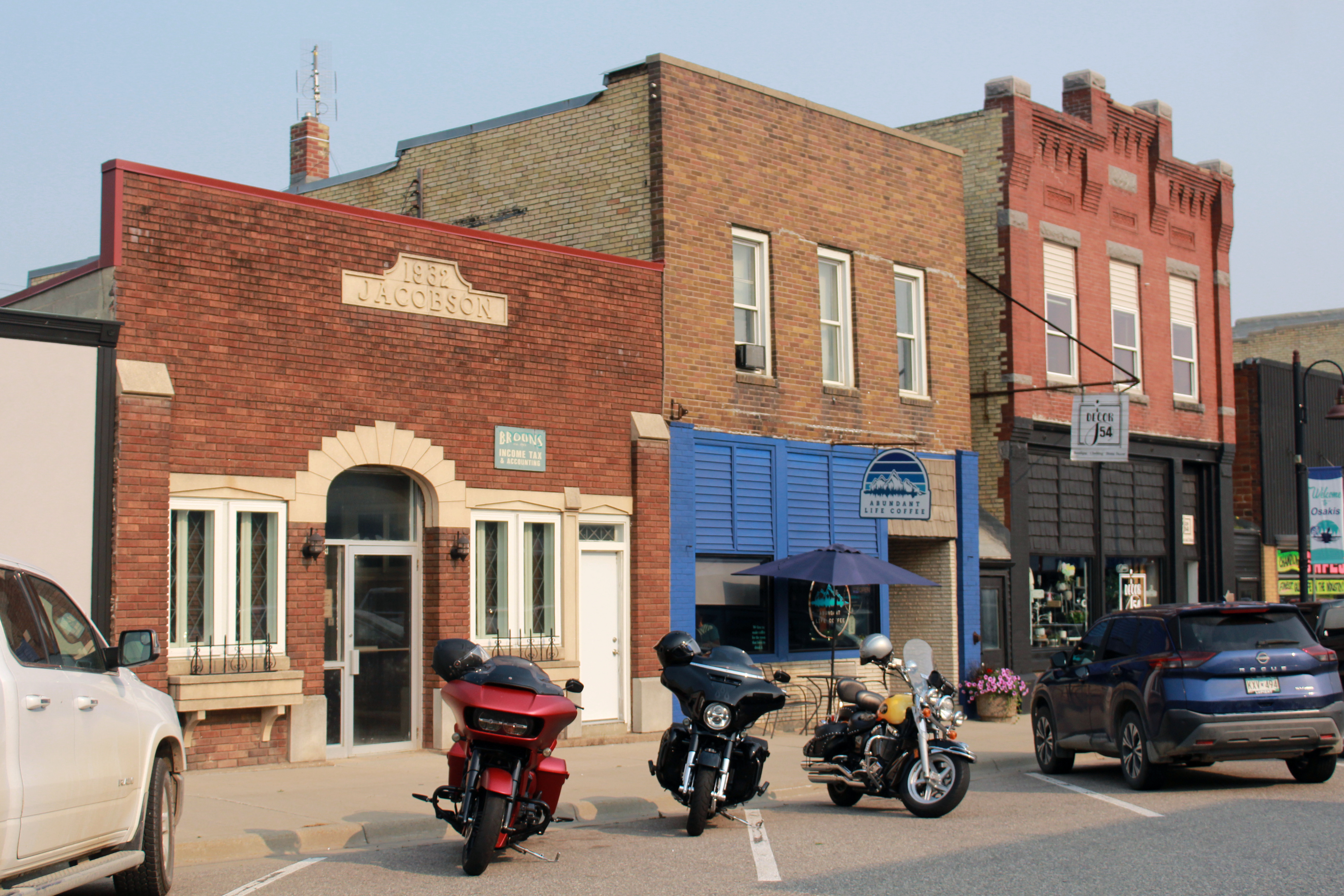
- Businesses on Central Avenue

- Location of Osakis, Minnesota
- Coordinates: 45°51′53″N 95°09′09″W
- Country: United States
- State: Minnesota
- Counties: Douglas, Todd
- Founded: 1866

Area
  - Total: 1.97 sq mi (5.11 km^{2})
  - Land: 1.92 sq mi (4.98 km^{2})
  - Water: 0.054 sq mi (0.14 km^{2})
- Elevation: 1,355 ft (413 m)

Population (2020)
  - Total: 1,771
  - Density: 921.8/sq mi (355.91/km^{2})
- Time zone: UTC-6 (Central (CST))
  - Summer (DST): UTC-5 (CDT)
- ZIP code: 56360
- Area code: 320
- FIPS code: 27-48796
- GNIS feature ID: 2396090
- Website: cityofosakis.com

Osakis (/oʊˈseɪkɪs/ oh-SAY-kis) is a city in Douglas and Todd counties in the U.S. state of Minnesota. The population was 1,771 at the 2020 census.

== History ==
The city took its name from nearby Lake Osakis.

The John B. Johnson House is located in Osakis and is listed in the National Register of Historic Places (NRHP).

== Geography ==
According to the United States Census Bureau, the city has a total area of 2.07 square miles (5.36 km^{2}); 1.95 square miles (5.05 km^{2}) is land and 0.12 square miles (0.31 km^{2}) is water. The ice-out records for Lake Osakis go back to 1870; this is the longest time series of any lake in Minnesota.

The main part of Osakis is in Douglas County; only a small part of the city extends into Todd County. Osakis is situated on the southwest shore of Lake Osakis, on Minnesota State Highway 27. Osakis is approximately one mile (1.6 km) from exit 114 of Interstate 94/U.S. Highway 52.

== Demographics ==
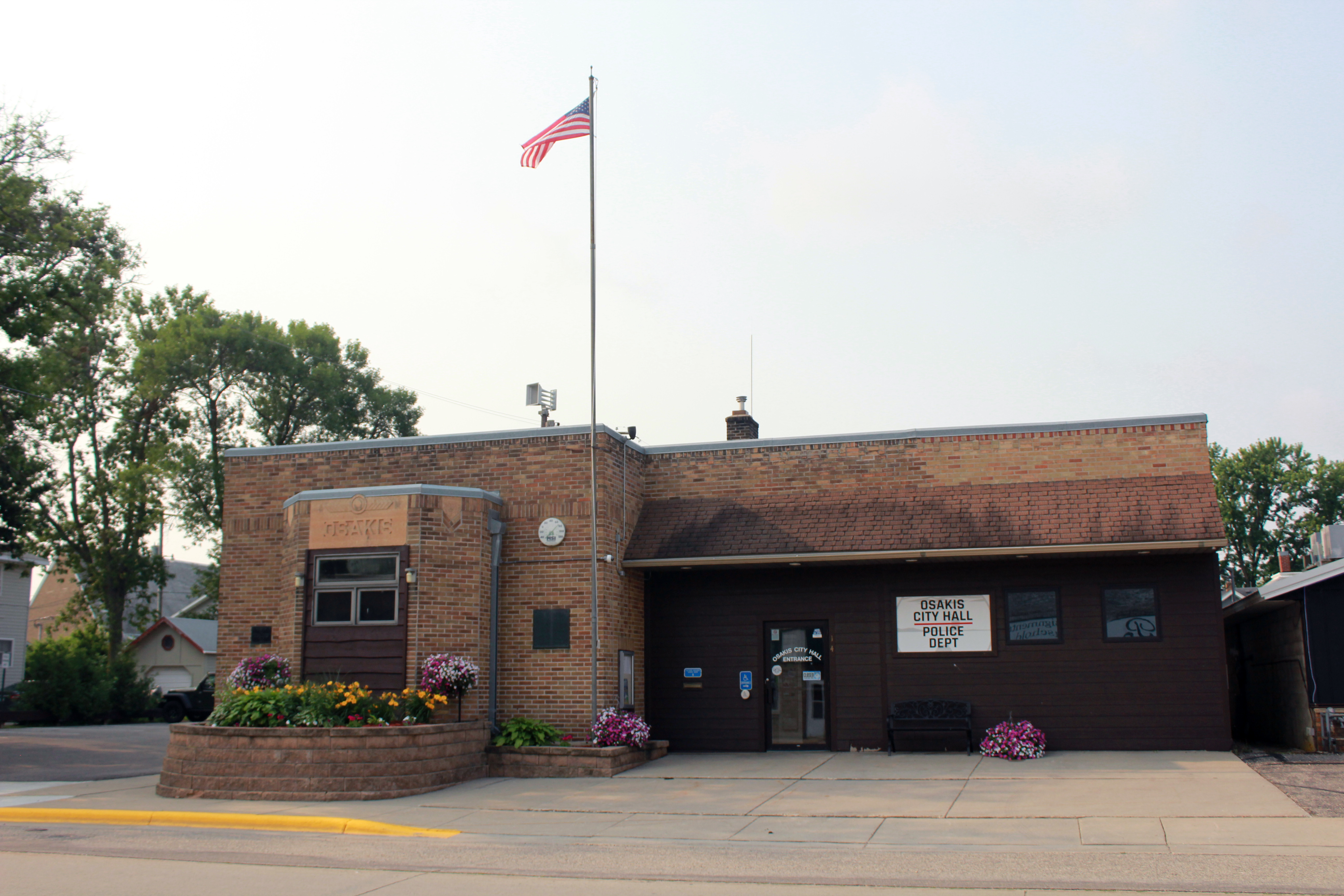
City Hall & Police Station

Historical population
Census	Pop.	Note	%±
1880	252		—
1890	472		87.3%
1900	918		94.5%
1910	1,013		10.3%
1920	1,480		46.1%
1930	1,155		−22.0%
1940	1,483		28.4%
1950	1,488		0.3%
1960	1,396		−6.2%
1970	1,306		−6.4%
1980	1,355		3.8%
1990	1,256		−7.3%
2000	1,567		24.8%
2010	1,740		11.0%
2020	1,771		1.8%
U.S. Decennial Census; 2020 Census

=== 2020 census ===
As of the 2020 census, Osakis had a population of 1,771. The median age was 40.8 years. 24.4% of residents were under the age of 18 and 23.8% of residents were 65 years of age or older. For every 100 females there were 90.2 males, and for every 100 females age 18 and over there were 90.3 males age 18 and over.

0.0% of residents lived in urban areas, while 100.0% lived in rural areas.

There were 732 households in Osakis, of which 28.8% had children under the age of 18 living in them. Of all households, 43.4% were married-couple households, 21.2% were households with a male householder and no spouse or partner present, and 29.6% were households with a female householder and no spouse or partner present. About 34.9% of all households were made up of individuals and 17.3% had someone living alone who was 65 years of age or older.

There were 977 housing units, of which 25.1% were vacant. The homeowner vacancy rate was 2.3% and the rental vacancy rate was 10.1%.

Racial composition as of the 2020 census
Race	Number	Percent
White	1,651	93.2%
Black or African American	19	1.1%
American Indian and Alaska Native	7	0.4%
Asian	2	0.1%
Native Hawaiian and Other Pacific Islander	1	0.1%
Some other race	28	1.6%
Two or more races	63	3.6%
Hispanic or Latino (of any race)	44	2.5%

=== 2010 census ===
As of the census of 2010, there were 1,740 people, 743 households, and 440 families living in the city. The population density was 892.3 inhabitants per square mile (344.5/km^{2}). There were 942 housing units at an average density of 483.1 per square mile (186.5/km^{2}). The racial makeup of the city was 98.3% White, 0.3% African American, 0.2% Native American, 0.3% Asian, 0.1% from other races, and 0.7% from two or more races. Hispanic or Latino of any race were 0.7% of the population.

There were 743 households, of which 28.4% had children under the age of 18 living with them, 45.6% were married couples living together, 10.0% had a female householder with no husband present, 3.6% had a male householder with no wife present, and 40.8% were non-families. 35.4% of all households were made up of individuals, and 19.7% had someone living alone who was 65 years of age or older. The average household size was 2.25 and the average family size was 2.90.

The median age in the city was 42.2 years. 24.5% of residents were under the age of 18; 6% were between the ages of 18 and 24; 22.7% were from 25 to 44; 21.3% were from 45 to 64; and 25.6% were 65 years of age or older. The gender makeup of the city was 47.3% male and 52.7% female.

=== 2000 census ===
As of the census of 2000, there were 1,567 people, 661 households, and 405 families living in the city. The population density was 779.4 inhabitants per square mile (300.9/km^{2}). There were 760 housing units at an average density of 378.0 per square mile (145.9/km^{2}). The racial makeup of the city was 98.15% White, 0.13% African American, 0.38% Native American, 0.70% Asian, and 0.64% from two or more races. Hispanic or Latino of any race were 0.64% of the population.

There were 661 households, out of which 26.2% had children under the age of 18 living with them, 50.2% were married couples living together, 7.4% had a female householder with no husband present, and 38.7% were non-families. 34.8% of all households were made up of individuals, and 22.4% had someone living alone who was 65 years of age or older. The average household size was 2.23 and the average family size was 2.84.

In the city, the population was spread out, with 22.0% under the age of 18, 6.8% from 18 to 24, 21.4% from 25 to 44, 20.2% from 45 to 64, and 29.7% who were 65 years of age or older. The median age was 45 years. For every 100 females, there were 90.2 males. For every 100 females age 18 and over, there were 85.0 males.

The median income for a household in the city was $29,833, and the median income for a family was $38,864. Males had a median income of $28,819 versus $20,000 for females. The per capita income for the city was $15,212. About 5.6% of families and 9.1% of the population were below the poverty line, including 8.1% of those under age 18 and 13.7% of those age 65 or over.

== Notable natives ==
- Leif Enger, author of the novel Peace Like a River, was born and raised in Osakis.
- Tommy Gibbons and his brother Mike Gibbons, members of the International Boxing Hall of Fame, had a summer home on Osakis Lake.
- Gar Wood, inventor of the hydraulic-lift dump truck, boat designer, boat racer, and world water speed record holder was raised in Osakis.
