= Peace Like a River =

Novel by Leif Enger

- Author: Leif Enger
- Language: English
- Genre: Novel, drama
- Publisher: Atlantic Monthly Press
- Publication date: September 11, 2001
- Publication place: United States
- Media type: Print (hardback & paperback)
- Pages: 320 pp
- ISBN: 978-0-8021-3925-2

Peace Like a River (2001) is the debut novel by Leif Enger, who took the title from the lyrics of the hymn "It Is Well with My Soul", which was performed at his wedding. Enger wrote the novel to amuse his family, taking story suggestions from his children and giving the lead character asthma to encourage one of his sons, who also has asthma.

== Synopsis ==
The novel opens in 1951 when Reuben Land is born with faulty lungs; it is his father, Jeremiah, who miraculously and heroically saves his life. Reuben, the eleven-year-old narrator, goes on to explain that his father performed several true miracles in his lifetime, the first of which was the aforementioned bringing Reuben to life. Jeremiah is an extremely religious single father to three children: Davy, the oldest, Reuben, the middle child, and the youngest and only daughter, Swede.

The Lands lead a calm life in the small town of Roofing until Jeremiah, who is also the school janitor, prevents the town's bullies, Israel Finch and Tommy Basca, from attacking Davy's girlfriend in the school locker room. After this, the Lands go on a hunting trip at Jeremiah's old friend August's house, at which Davy avoids his father and Reuben attempts to shoot a gun. When they return home, they find that their front door has been tarred, presumably by Basca and Finch.

One evening Jeremiah takes Reuben to the new church he has been attending, but Reuben skips out of most of the ceremony to spend time with his crush, Bethany Orchard. When he returns to the main chapel, he finds several people including his father speaking in foreign tongues and writhing on the ground, and when the two return from church, they find that the visibly-shaken Swede has just returned from being briefly kidnapped by Basca and Finch. They celebrate her 9th birthday the next day and try to distract her with Western-themed gifts, which she adores and happily accepts, as well as a nicer-than-usual dinner. However, Lurvy, a travelling salesman and friend of Jeremiah’s, interrupts their dinner, greedily eating a lot of Jeremiah's specialty soup. Surprisingly, however, they never run out.

Sometime after Swede's birthday, Reuben wakes up in the middle of the night to two people breaking into their house. Davy, who also happens to be awake with a gun clutched in his hands, warns Reuben to remain quiet. When Finch and Basca appear at the bedroom door, Davy commands them to turn on the lights before shooting both of them dead.

Life for the Lands quickly deteriorates; Davy goes to jail, and Jeremiah is fired from his job. For the trial, the Lands stay with their lawyer, Mr. DeCuellar, as well as his wife. At the trial, Reuben testifies and realizes that, partly due to his own faults during his testimony, Davy is not going to win. Because of this, Swede and Reuben later concoct a plan to break Davy out of jail, but they fall asleep while waiting, and when they wake, the siblings find out that Davy has already escaped on his own.

The Lands wait to hear about Davy. (He had first stolen a horse before hitchhiking his way to August's, then borrowing a car and leaving for some unknown destination.) Meanwhile, the police and a federal investigator named Andreeson press the Lands for information and encourage them to turn Davy in if he makes contact, but Jeremiah refuses to cooperate. Furthermore, Jeremiah, based entirely on faith that he will find his son, decides to leave the house in Roofing and pursue Davy in a new Airstream trailer that he inherited from the now dead Lurvy.

Jeremiah, Reuben, and Swede pack up all of their things and head West for August's house. They learn that Andreeson has been by and he is likely following them, but still no one knows where Davy is headed. While they are resting in a small town in North Dakota, Andreeson approaches them from his nearby car, but Jeremiah rebukes everything the "fed" has to say. Meanwhile, Swede secretly sabotages Andreeson's car, meaning that the Lands can now escape. Subsequently, the Lands travel for hours without stopping at a gas station because Andreeson had placed police officers all along their route to look for them. Miraculously, they do not run out of fuel, though, and they are never spotted, despite the distinctive Airstream trailer.

Finally, they stop into a gas station in the Badlands. A woman named Roxanna Cawley runs it, and she invites them to stay in her home and wait out the incoming snowstorm. The Lands resume a somewhat normal life at Roxanna's: Jeremiah recovers from pneumonia that he had contracted back in Roofing and begins to court Roxanna. Even still, Andreeson appears from time to time, and eventually, Jeremiah gives in to the officer's requests for help looking for Davy, as it appears that Andreeson just wants to get Davy back.

One day while he is near the barn, Reuben sees a figure on a horse atop a hill and instantly recognizes it as Davy. Despite his troubled lungs, Reuben decides to hike up the snowy hill and reunite with his brother. After some convincing, Davy reluctantly agrees to show Reuben where he is living. A man by the name of Jape Waltzer owns—even this is put into question—the small cabin where Davy is living and also has a young girl named Sara that Mr. Waltzer intends to marry once she is old enough. He has taken Davy in, which was kind, but he is a cruel man and the antithesis of Jeremiah. After he sees this, Reuben is conflicted about telling anyone about Davy's whereabouts, but Davy makes him promise to keep it a secret.

Andreeson, hot on the case, goes missing during a snowstorm, and Reuben theorizes that Waltzer lured the federal agent away from the nearby town to kill him. Because of this, Reuben tells Jeremiah. As a result, a search party attempts to find Waltzer and Davy, but nothing comes of it. The Lands and Roxanna eventually move back home and rent a farm; soon after, Jeremiah and Roxanna are married. Life returns to normal until Davy shows up one night with Sara in a car he stole from Waltzer. The family reconnects that night, knowing that Davy will have to leave the following day.

As Davy prepares to leave the next morning, Waltzer shoots from where he had been waiting, hitting both Jeremiah and Reuben. As the commotion continues, Reuben describes a beautiful meadow where he and Jeremiah meet, presumably heaven, with his dad laughing and then drifting away in a river. Reuben wakes up to find himself alive, Jeremiah dead, Davy gone, and Waltzer never to be seen again. The narrative jumps forward in time, explaining that Roxanna continued to raise them and Sara stayed on the farm. Swede, with her flair for drama and love of literature, became a famous writer, Davy escaped to Canada, and Reuben happily married Sara.

== Awards and nominations ==
- Winner, ALA Alex Awards; best adult novel for teens.
- Winner, Independent Publisher Book Award
- Book Sense book of the Year (selected by the Independent Booksellers of America)
