= Lake Carlos State Park =

- Lake Carlos State Park WPA/Rustic Style Historic District
- U.S. National Register of Historic Places
- U.S. Historic district
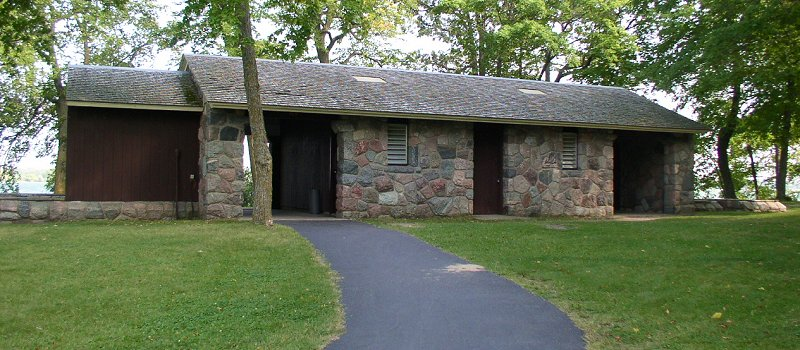
- The Lake Carlos State Park bath house.

- Location within Minnesota Location within the United States
- Location: Douglas County, Minnesota, Off MN 29 at NW end of Lake Carlos
- Nearest city: Carlos, Minnesota
- Coordinates: 45°59′43″N 95°20′41″W
- MPS: Minnesota State Park CCC/WPA/Rustic Style MPS
- NRHP reference No.: 89001654
- Added to NRHP: July 2, 1992

- Lake Carlos State Park WPA/Rustic Style Group Camp
- U.S. National Register of Historic Places
- Location: Off MN 29 on NE shore of Lake Carlos, Carlos Township
- Nearest city: Carlos, Minnesota
- Coordinates: 45°59′31″N 95°20′50″W
- MPS: Minnesota State Park CCC/WPA/Rustic Style MPS
- NRHP reference No.: 92000776
- Added to NRHP: July 2, 1992

Lake Carlos State Park is a state park about 10 miles north of Alexandria, Minnesota, USA. The park was established in 1937 to provide a public recreational facility in one of Minnesota's summer resort centers, and attracts tourists from Minnesota and bordering states.

Visitors often view fauna such as beaver, deer, loons, grebes, various ducks and herons.

Lake Carlos itself covers an area of 2,605.12 acres including 12.83 miles of shoreline. The lake has a maximum depth of 163 feet with an average depth of 50 feet. Fish in Lake Carlos include black bullhead, black crappie, bluegill, bowfin (dogfish),brown bullhead, common carp, greater redhorse, green sunfish, hybrid sunfish, largemouth bass, northern pike, pumpkinseed, rock bass, shorthead redhorse, smallmouth bass, sunfish, tullibee (cisco), walleye, white sucker, yellow bullhead, and yellow perch.

Five buildings in the park, constructed by the Works Progress Administration in the Rustic Style, are included within the National Register of Historic Places. These include the Mess Hall and Crafts Building within the group camp area, as well as the water tower, sanitation building, and bath house within the public use area.

The namesake lake, Lake Carlos, was named for the friend of an early settler.
