= Zehrer =

Zehrer is a surname. Notable people with the surname include:

- Hans Zehrer (1899–1966), German journalist
- Joseph Zehrer (born 1954), German artist
- Paul Zehrer (born 1963), American film and television director, writer, producer, and editor
- Terrence "Lee" Zehrer (born 1947), American businessman
- Andreas Zehrer (born 1966), Austrian equestrian
