= Lebanon, New Hampshire =

- City
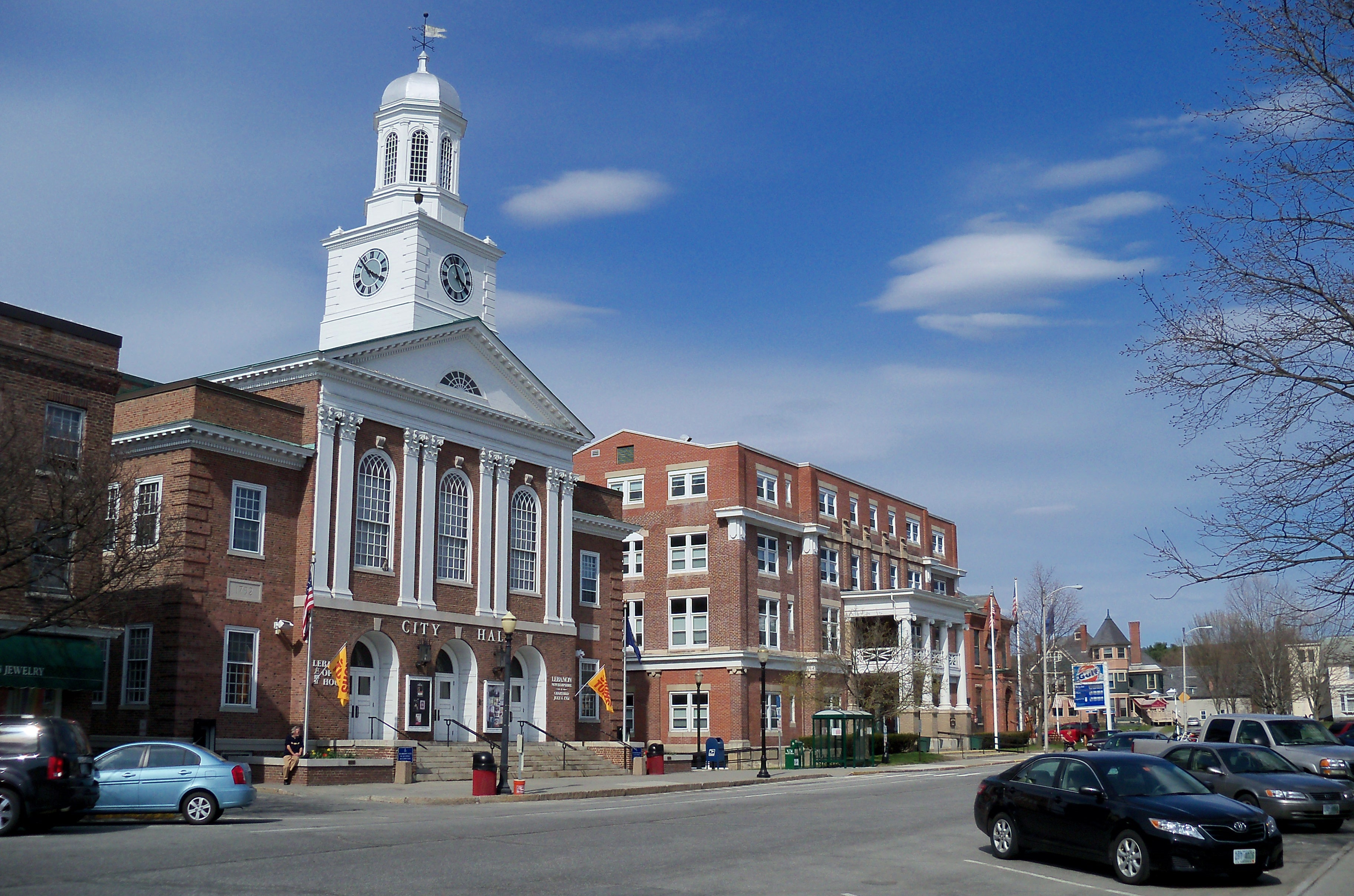
- Buildings along Park Street in downtown Lebanon

- Seal

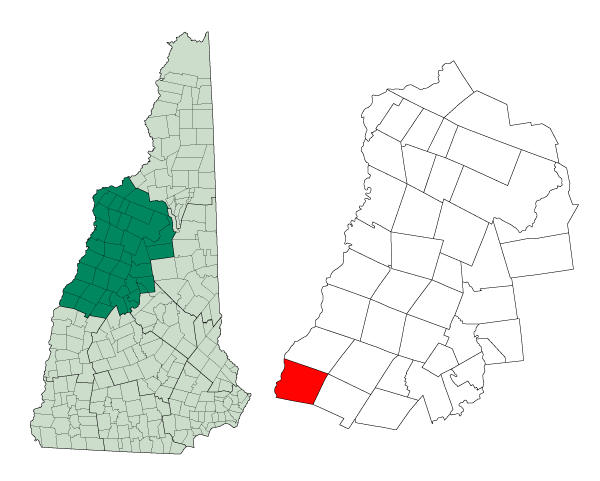
- Location in Grafton County, New Hampshire
- Coordinates: 43°38′07″N 72°15′11″W
- Country: United States
- State: New Hampshire
- County: Grafton
- Incorporated: 1761
- City: 1958
- Population centers: Lebanon; East Wilder; Mascoma; West Lebanon

Government
  - Mayor: Doug Whittlesey
  - Assistant Mayor: Devin R. Wilkie
  - City Council: Members: Timothy J. McNamara; Nicole Ford Burley; Laurel Stavis; Kellen Appleton; Eric Cole; Andrew Faunce; Lori Key
  - City Manager: Andrew Hosmer

Area
  - Total: 41.27 sq mi (106.90 km^{2})
  - Land: 40.31 sq mi (104.39 km^{2})
  - Water: 0.97 sq mi (2.51 km^{2}) 2.35%
- Elevation: 607 ft (185 m)

Population (2020)
  - Total: 14,282
  - Density: 354.3/sq mi (136.81/km^{2})
  - μSA: 223,471
- Time zone: UTC−5 (Eastern)
  - Summer (DST): UTC−4 (Eastern)
- ZIP Codes: 03756, 03766 (Lebanon); 03784 (West Lebanon)
- Area code: 603
- FIPS code: 33-41300
- GNIS feature ID: 873643
- Website: lebanonnh.gov

Lebanon (/ˈlɛbənən/ LEB-ən-ən) is the only city in Grafton County, New Hampshire, United States. The population was 14,282 at the 2020 census, up from 13,151 at the 2010 census. Lebanon is in western New Hampshire, south of Hanover, near the Connecticut River. It is the home to Dartmouth–Hitchcock Medical Center and Dartmouth College's Geisel School of Medicine, together comprising the largest medical facility between Boston, Massachusetts, and Burlington, Vermont.

Lebanon is a core city of the Lebanon–Claremont micropolitan area, comprising four counties in the upper Connecticut River valley, two in New Hampshire and two in Vermont.

== History ==
Lebanon was chartered as a town by colonial governor Benning Wentworth on July 4, 1761, one of 16 along the Connecticut River. It was named for Lebanon, Connecticut, from where many early settlers had come or would come, including the Reverend Eleazar Wheelock, who arrived in 1770 and founded Dartmouth College. Lebanon, Connecticut, was the original home of Moor's Charity School, the antecedent of Dartmouth College.

Early settlement concentrated along the Connecticut River in what is now West Lebanon, and in the Mascoma Lake region near Enfield. In the mid-19th century, a mill district developed at falls on the Mascoma River. Industries included, at various times, furniture mills, a tannery, several machine shops, a woolen textile mill, and a clothing factory. In the mid-19th century, this district attracted many French workers from Canada's Quebec province. This became the center of town, although West Lebanon grew into a railroad hub with a separate identity after lines entered from Boston. This rail center would become known as "Westboro" after two trains collided when West Lebanon was mistaken for Lebanon.

The mill district, like the railroad, declined into the 1950s and 1960s. The town suffered two major fires; the second, in 1964, destroyed a large portion of the old mill district. Reconstruction resulted in a controversial urban renewal project featuring a closed-off district, called The Mall, built to replace the destroyed Hanover Street area. Partly in defiance of economic decline, and partly to counter a movement by West Lebanon to declare itself an independent town, Lebanon re-incorporated as a city in 1958.

The routing of Interstates 89 and 91 through Lebanon and nearby White River Junction, Vermont, in addition to the growth of Dartmouth College, led to the area's economic revival. The former mill town now has a mixed economy based on education, medical services, high-technology and retail. Just south of the village of West Lebanon, a major shopping district has sprung up at the intersection of Route 12A and I-89. Lebanon has undertaken improvements to its recreational facilities, including miles of hiking trails, a municipal ski area, a swimming pool and several sports fields.

In 1991, the Dartmouth–Hitchcock Medical Center, along with most departments of Dartmouth Medical School, moved from Hanover to a new campus just south of the Lebanon-Hanover town line. A number of medical and high-tech firms have located facilities near the medical center campus. TomTom, a leading worldwide developer of mapping databases, has its North American headquarters in Lebanon. Novo and Microsoft also have major facilities here.

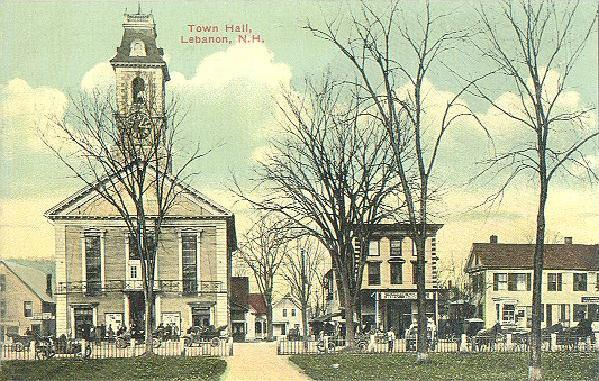
Old Town Hall in 1918

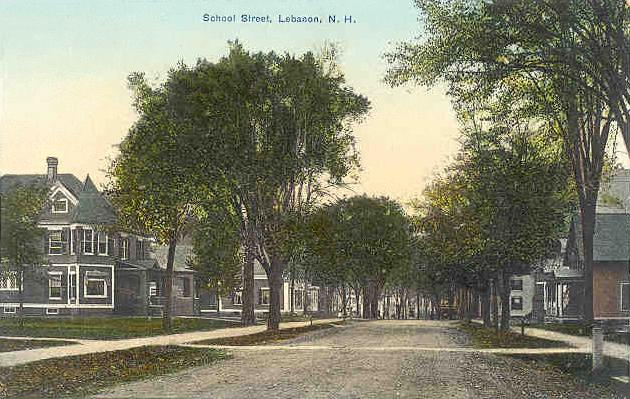
School Street c. 1910

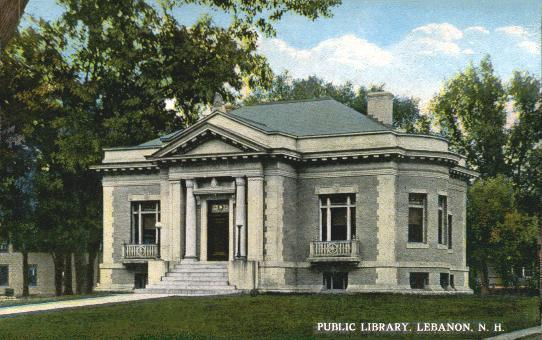
Public Library c. 1910

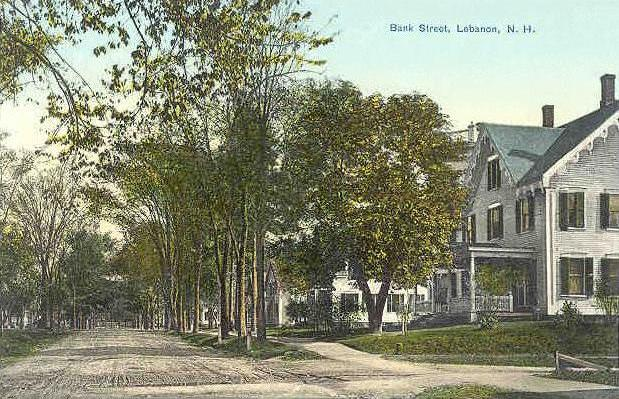
Bank Street c. 1910

== Geography ==
According to the United States Census Bureau, the city has a total area of 41.3 square miles (106.9 km^{2}), of which 40.3 square miles (104.4 km^{2}) are land and 0.97 square miles (2.5 km^{2}) are water, comprising 2.35% of the city. The western boundary of Lebanon is the Connecticut River, which is also the state boundary with Vermont. The village of West Lebanon occupies the western part of the city, along the Connecticut River. Downtown Lebanon is 3 miles (5 km) to the east, along the Mascoma River, a tributary of the Connecticut. The city is fully within the Connecticut River watershed. The southern end of Moose Mountain is in the northeast. The highest point in Lebanon is the northern end of Shaker Mountain, at 1,657 feet (505 m) above sea level, on the eastern border of the city.

=== Climate ===
According to the Köppen Climate Classification system, Lebanon has a warm-summer humid continental climate, abbreviated "Dfb" on climate maps. The hottest temperature recorded in Lebanon was 100 °F (37.8 °C) on June 24, 2025, while the coldest temperature recorded was −34 °F (−36.7 °C) on January 14, 1957.

Climate data for Lebanon, New Hampshire, 1991–2020 normals, extremes 1948–present
Month	Jan	Feb	Mar	Apr	May	Jun	Jul	Aug	Sep	Oct	Nov	Dec	Year
Record high °F (°C)	67 (19)	68 (20)	85 (29)	91 (33)	96 (36)	100 (38)	99 (37)	98 (37)	95 (35)	87 (31)	80 (27)	69 (21)	100 (38)
Mean maximum °F (°C)	50.9 (10.5)	52.0 (11.1)	62.7 (17.1)	80.5 (26.9)	88.3 (31.3)	91.8 (33.2)	92.9 (33.8)	90.8 (32.7)	88.0 (31.1)	77.4 (25.2)	65.8 (18.8)	55.2 (12.9)	94.7 (34.8)
Mean daily maximum °F (°C)	30.3 (−0.9)	33.9 (1.1)	43.0 (6.1)	56.6 (13.7)	69.7 (20.9)	77.9 (25.5)	82.7 (28.2)	81.1 (27.3)	72.9 (22.7)	59.8 (15.4)	46.8 (8.2)	35.5 (1.9)	57.5 (14.2)
Daily mean °F (°C)	19.8 (−6.8)	22.4 (−5.3)	31.9 (−0.1)	44.3 (6.8)	56.7 (13.7)	65.1 (18.4)	70.3 (21.3)	68.6 (20.3)	60.7 (15.9)	48.6 (9.2)	37.2 (2.9)	26.8 (−2.9)	46.0 (7.8)
Mean daily minimum °F (°C)	9.3 (−12.6)	11.0 (−11.7)	20.7 (−6.3)	31.9 (−0.1)	43.7 (6.5)	52.4 (11.3)	57.8 (14.3)	56.2 (13.4)	48.6 (9.2)	37.4 (3.0)	27.7 (−2.4)	18.1 (−7.7)	34.6 (1.4)
Mean minimum °F (°C)	−15.5 (−26.4)	−12.4 (−24.7)	−2.7 (−19.3)	18.4 (−7.6)	28.5 (−1.9)	38.4 (3.6)	46.9 (8.3)	44.4 (6.9)	34.4 (1.3)	22.5 (−5.3)	13.0 (−10.6)	−5.6 (−20.9)	−19.4 (−28.6)
Record low °F (°C)	−34 (−37)	−30 (−34)	−26 (−32)	2 (−17)	20 (−7)	30 (−1)	38 (3)	30 (−1)	20 (−7)	13 (−11)	−10 (−23)	−27 (−33)	−34 (−37)
Average precipitation inches (mm)	2.29 (58)	2.10 (53)	2.70 (69)	2.99 (76)	3.32 (84)	3.80 (97)	3.99 (101)	3.62 (92)	3.44 (87)	4.00 (102)	2.98 (76)	2.84 (72)	38.07 (967)
Average snowfall inches (cm)	19.0 (48)	17.1 (43)	11.5 (29)	3.4 (8.6)	0.1 (0.25)	0.0 (0.0)	0.0 (0.0)	0.0 (0.0)	0.0 (0.0)	0.2 (0.51)	4.4 (11)	16.4 (42)	72.1 (182.36)
Average extreme snow depth inches (cm)	14.8 (38)	17.7 (45)	13.2 (34)	3.5 (8.9)	0.1 (0.25)	0.0 (0.0)	0.0 (0.0)	0.0 (0.0)	0.0 (0.0)	0.2 (0.51)	3.2 (8.1)	9.7 (25)	19.0 (48)
Average precipitation days (≥ 0.01 in)	10.5	10.3	10.9	12.1	13.9	14.7	14.5	13.6	12.5	13.5	11.4	12.4	150.3
Average snowy days (≥ 0.1 in)	7.5	5.9	4.8	1.4	0.0	0.0	0.0	0.0	0.0	0.1	2.4	6.8	28.9
Source 1: NOAA
Source 2: National Weather Service

== Demographics ==
Historical population
Census	Pop.	Note	%±
1790	1,180		—
1800	1,574		33.4%
1810	1,808		14.9%
1820	1,710		−5.4%
1830	1,868		9.2%
1840	1,754		−6.1%
1850	2,127		21.3%
1860	2,322		9.2%
1870	3,094		33.2%
1880	3,354		8.4%
1890	3,703		10.4%
1900	4,965		34.1%
1910	5,718		15.2%
1920	6,162		7.8%
1930	7,073		14.8%
1940	7,590		7.3%
1950	8,495		11.9%
1960	9,299		9.5%
1970	9,725		4.6%
1980	11,134		14.5%
1990	12,183		9.4%
2000	12,568		3.2%
2010	13,151		4.6%
2020	14,282		8.6%
2021 (est.)	15,005		5.1%
U.S. Decennial Census

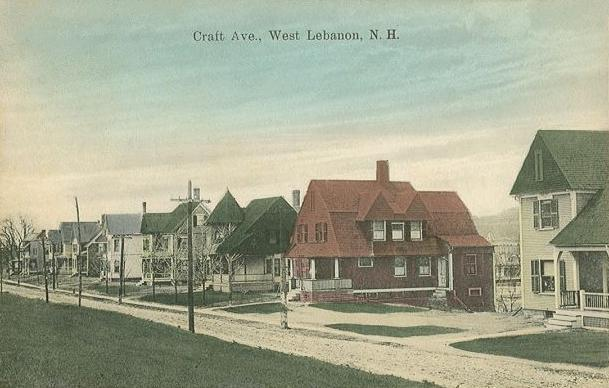
Crafts Avenue in 1912

=== 2020 census ===
As of the 2020 census, Lebanon had a population of 14,282. The median age was 38.7 years. 15.7% of residents were under the age of 18 and 20.4% of residents were 65 years of age or older. For every 100 females there were 89.0 males, and for every 100 females age 18 and over there were 88.0 males age 18 and over.

84.9% of residents lived in urban areas, while 15.1% lived in rural areas.

There were 6,805 households in Lebanon, of which 19.5% had children under the age of 18 living in them. Of all households, 37.9% were married-couple households, 20.7% were households with a male householder and no spouse or partner present, and 32.8% were households with a female householder and no spouse or partner present. About 38.7% of all households were made up of individuals and 14.9% had someone living alone who was 65 years of age or older.

There were 7,201 housing units, of which 5.5% were vacant. The homeowner vacancy rate was 1.3% and the rental vacancy rate was 3.9%.

Racial composition as of the 2020 census
Race	Number	Percent
White	11,626	81.4%
Black or African American	290	2.0%
American Indian and Alaska Native	36	0.3%
Asian	1,176	8.2%
Native Hawaiian and Other Pacific Islander	4	0.0%
Some other race	207	1.4%
Two or more races	943	6.6%
Hispanic or Latino (of any race)	570	4.0%

=== 2010 census ===
As of the census of 2010, there were 13,151 people, 6,186 households, and 3,269 families residing in the city. The population density was 326.2 inhabitants per square mile (125.9/km^{2}). There were 6,649 housing units at an average density of 164.9 per square mile (63.7/km^{2}). The racial makeup of the city was 88.4% White, 1.6% African American, 0.30% Native American, 6.8% Asian, 0.00% Pacific Islander, 0.80% some other race, and 2.10% from two or more races. Hispanic or Latino of any race were 2.9% of the population.

There were 6,186 households, out of which 24.2% had children under the age of 18 living with them, 40.5% were married couples living together, 8.9% had a female householder with no husband present, 3.4% had a male householder with no wife present, and 47.2% were non-families. Of all households, 36.8% were made up of individuals, and 12.4% were someone living alone who was 65 years of age or older. The average household size was 2.10, and the average family size was 2.76.

In the city, the population was spread out, with 20.5% from age 0-19, 6.3% from 20 to 24, 30.3% from 25 to 44, 27.6% from 45 to 64, and 15.3% who were 65 years of age or older. The median age was 39.4 years. The male population was 47.4% of the total, while the female population was 52.6%.

=== Income and poverty ===
For the period 2011–2015, the estimated median annual income for a household in the city was $53,004, and the median income for a family was $75,511. Male full-time workers had a median income of $51,735 versus $48,836 for females. The per capita income for the city was $36,370. About 8.7% of families and 12.3% of the entire population were below the poverty line, including 22.6% of those under 18 and 5.0% of those age 65 and over.

== Government and politics ==
The city government consists of a council–manager system. The city council consists of nine members elected to two-year terms. Six members are elected from three wards, each electing two members, and the other three are elected at large.

Politically the city is strongly Democratic. Joe Biden received 74% of the vote to Donald Trump's 25% in the 2020 United States presidential election.

== Education ==
Lebanon has its own elementary schools, middle school, and high school. Students from neighboring towns (Grantham and Plainfield) attend high school in Lebanon. On October 15, 2010, the city broke ground on a new middle school for grades 5–8 to replace an aging junior high facility and overcrowded elementary school facilities. Lebanon Middle School was completed in 2012.

Located on the downtown pedestrian mall is the Lebanon campus of Claremont-based River Valley Community College. Also downtown, the Alliance for the Visual Arts (AVA) offers classes in arts and crafts in a LEED-certified former factory building, which houses a ground floor gallery space. Many departments of Dartmouth College's Geisel School of Medicine are additionally located just north of downtown at Dartmouth–Hitchcock Medical Center.

== Transportation ==
=== Roads and highways ===
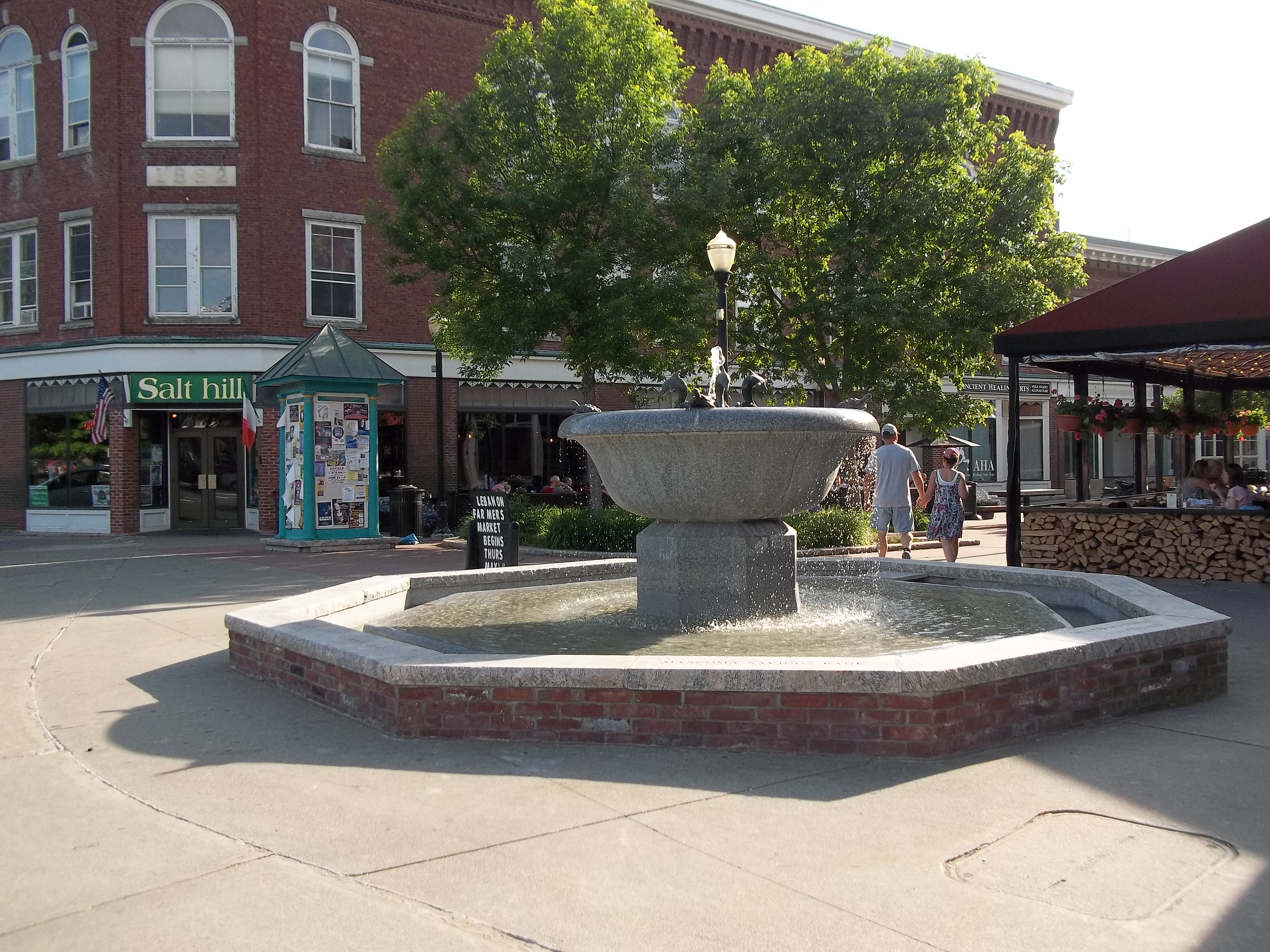
Fountain in downtown Lebanon, New Hampshire

Lebanon is served by Interstate 89, which meets Interstate 91 just across the Connecticut River in White River Junction. It is 58 miles (93 km) southeast along I-89 to Concord, the state capital, and 60 miles (97 km) northwest along I-89 to Montpelier, the capital of Vermont. U.S. Route 4 passes east–west through the centers of Lebanon and West Lebanon, leading east to Enfield and eventually Concord, and west towards Rutland, Vermont. New Hampshire Route 10 leads south from Lebanon along Interstate 89, eventually diverging to go to Newport. Route 10 leads north from West Lebanon into Hanover and points north along the Connecticut River. New Hampshire Route 120 passes north–south through downtown Lebanon, leading north into Hanover and south to Claremont. New Hampshire Route 12A begins in West Lebanon and heads south along the Connecticut River to Claremont. Near the eastern border of the city, New Hampshire Route 4A leaves US 4 to travel southeast towards Wilmot and central New Hampshire.

=== Public transportation ===
Lebanon Airport, adjacent to West Lebanon, has passenger service to Boston and New York City provided by Cape Air. Free public bus service for the major towns in the area including Lebanon is provided by Advance Transit, with weekday service to destinations such as Dartmouth–Hitchcock Medical Center, shopping plazas in West Lebanon, the villages of Lebanon and West Lebanon, as well as Hanover and White River Junction. Southeast Vermont Transit also provides a peak direction commuter bus route between DHMC to Bellows Falls, Vermont that also runs on weekdays.

The closest Greyhound bus terminal and Amtrak train station are both located in White River Junction, Vermont. Dartmouth Coach offers daily express bus service to Boston's Logan Airport and to New York City.

== Culture ==
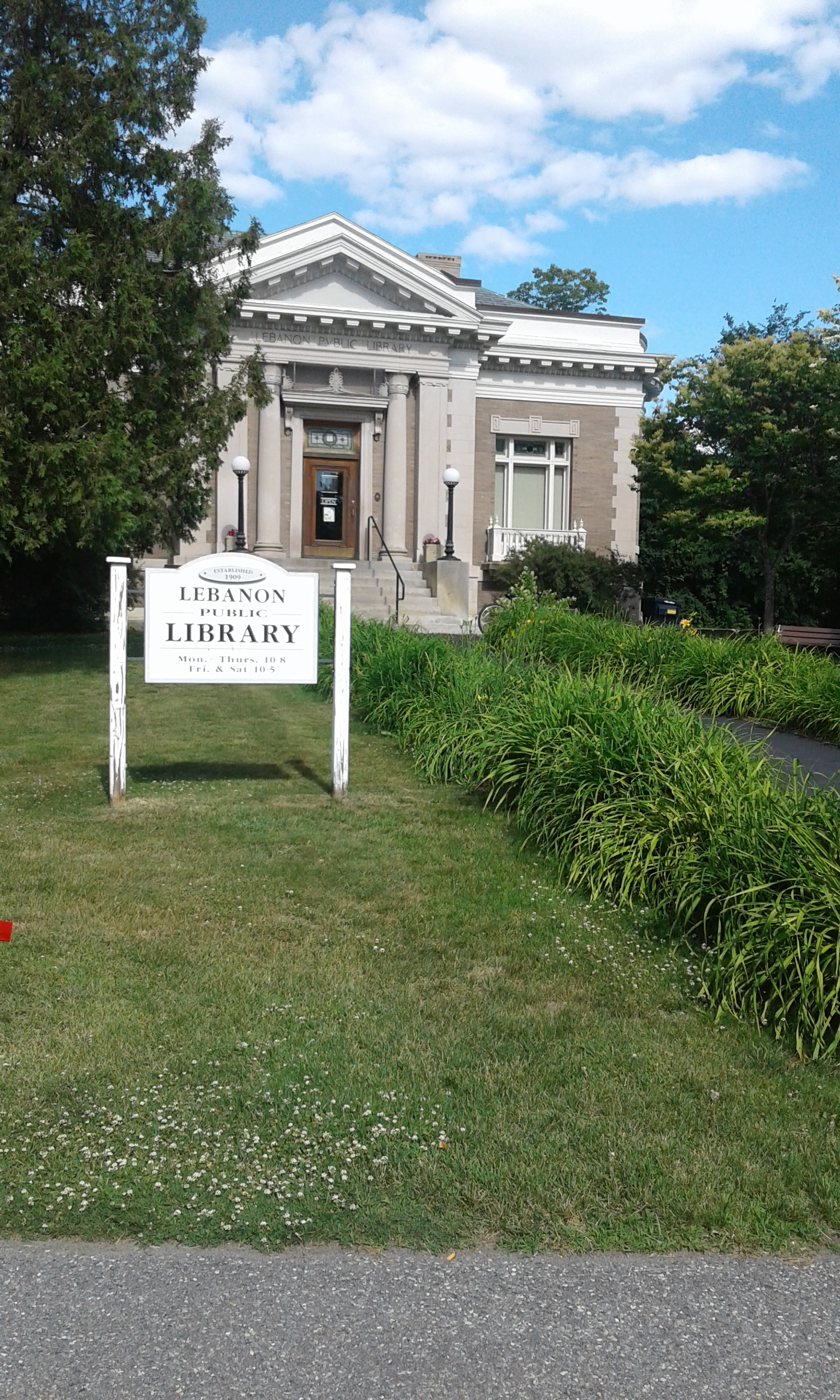
Lebanon Public Library, one of many Carnegie libraries in New Hampshire

Downtown Lebanon is a cultural hub with attractions such as the Lebanon Opera House (in City Hall), the AVA Gallery, seasonal Farmers' Market and summer concerts on the green. Opera North, based in the city, is the region's oldest professional opera company.

Lebanon Public Library, located downtown on East Park Street, is the primary library in the city, and the Kilton Public Library branch serves West Lebanon. Kilton was the first library in the U.S. to host a node of the Tor anonymity network.

The Carter Community Building Association (CCBA) operates an after-school activity center for primary school children and a fitness center for teens and adults. Salt Hill Pub frequently features live musical performances.

== Colburn Park ==
The Colburn Park Historic District is at the heart of Lebanon, consisting of Colburn Park and buildings around it—and many 19th-century buildings immediately adjacent to these. The district was listed on the National Register of Historic Places in 1986. The land that later developed into the park was donated in 1792 by Robert Colburn as the site for the community's meeting house, serving the purposes of church and town hall. Arterial roads were built to the area, and it began to develop as a commercial and civic center in the early 19th century. A weekly farmers' market is held there between June and September along with many community activities throughout the year.

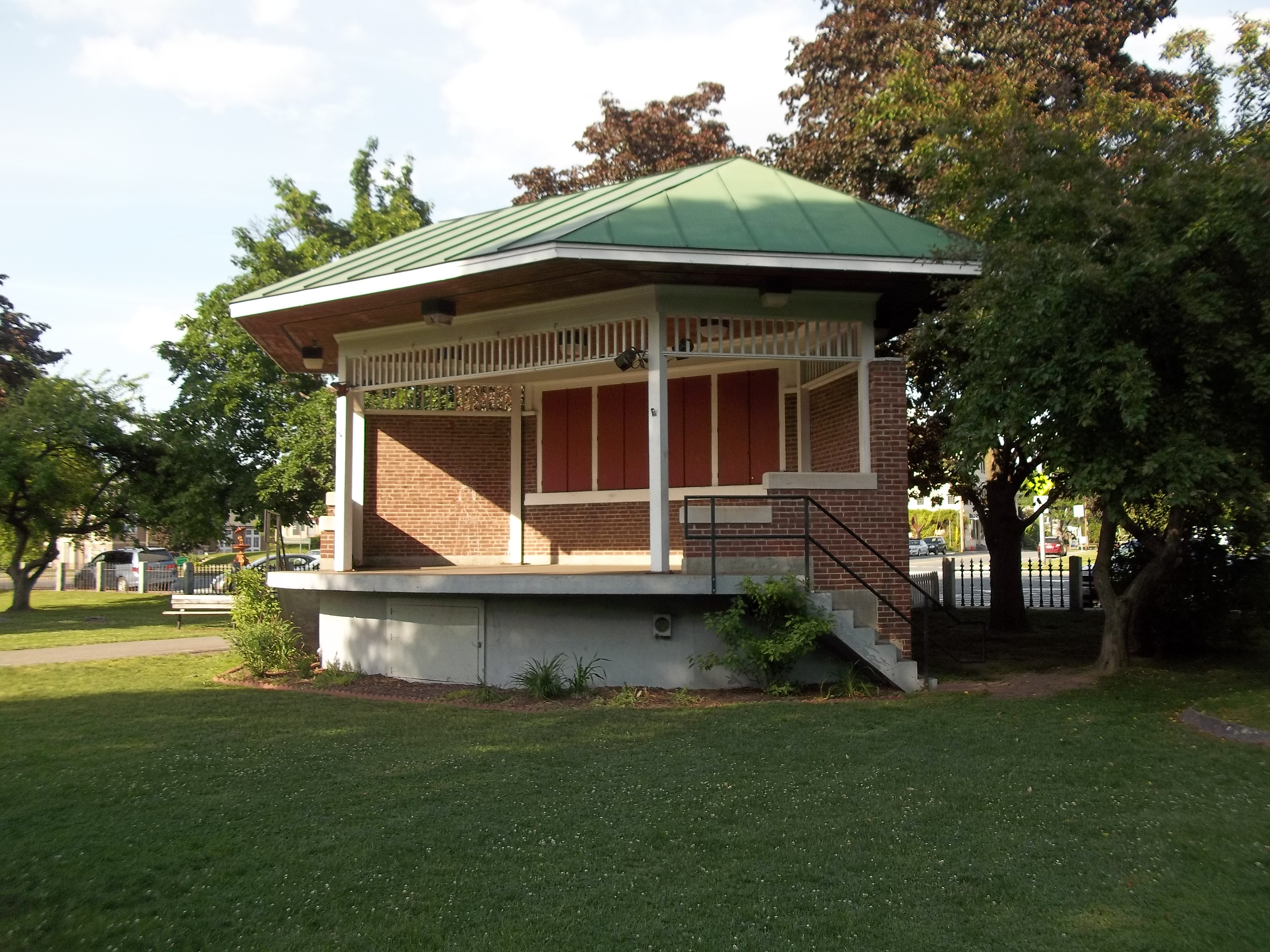
Stage

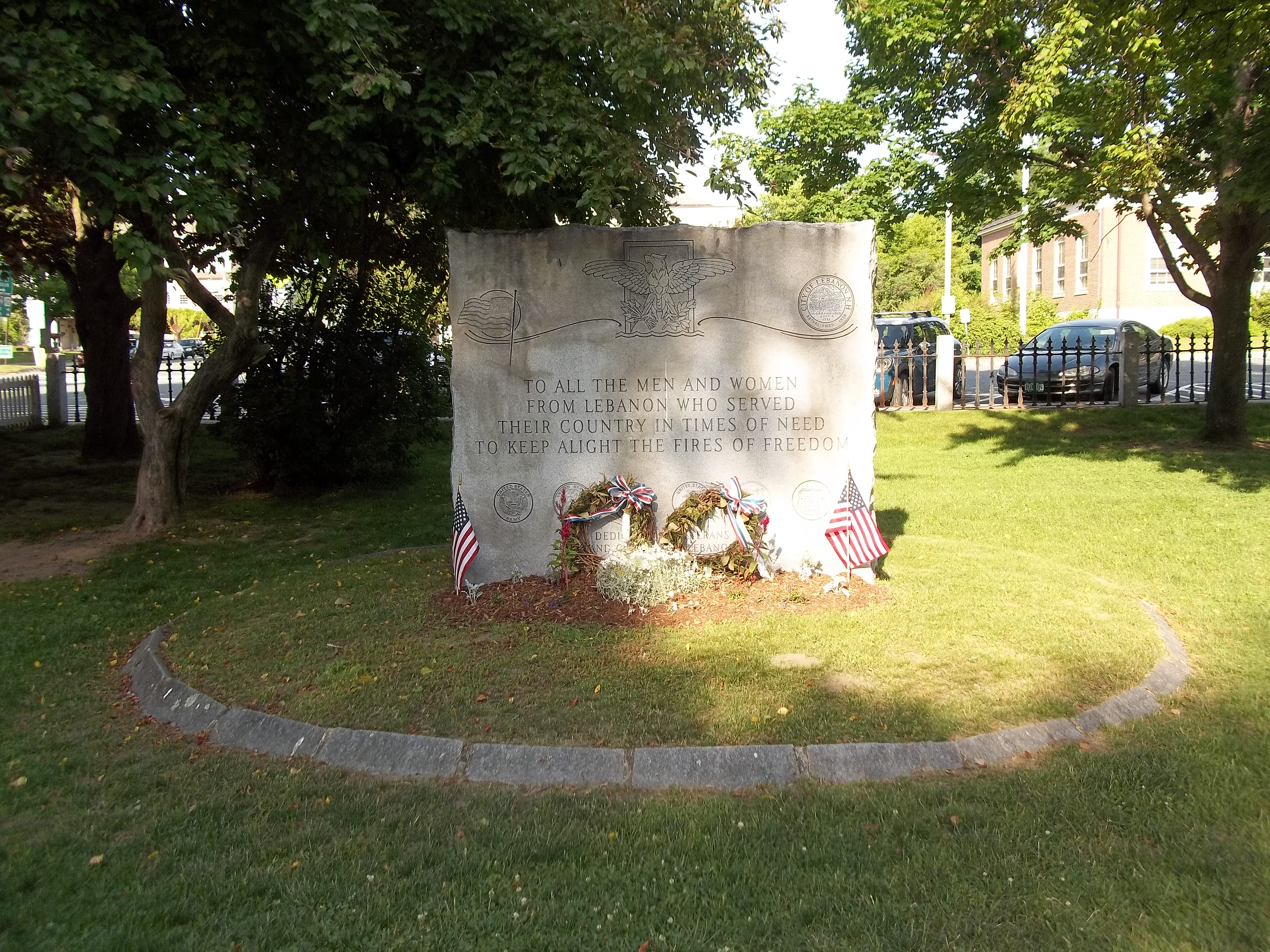
War memorial

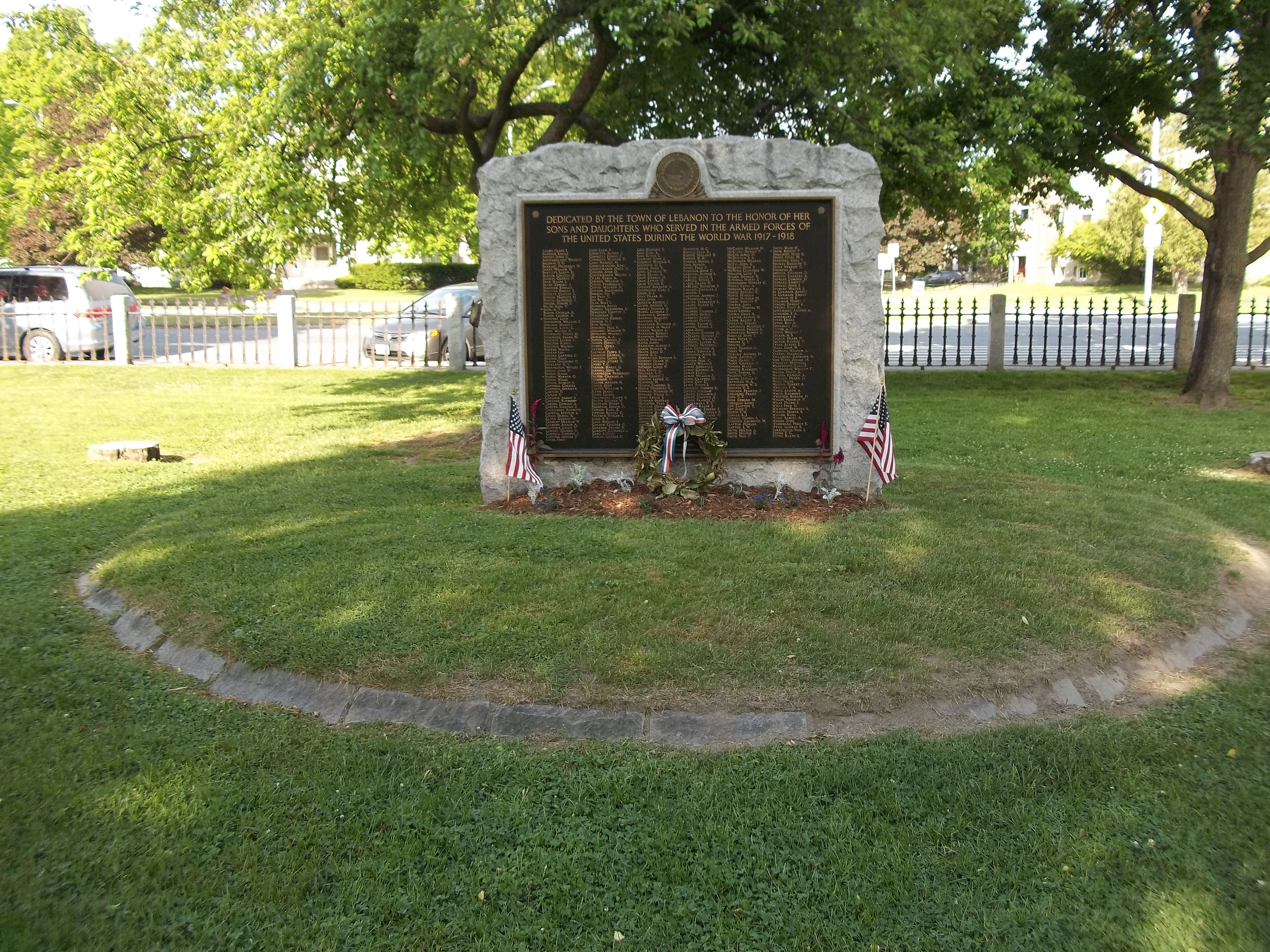
War memorial

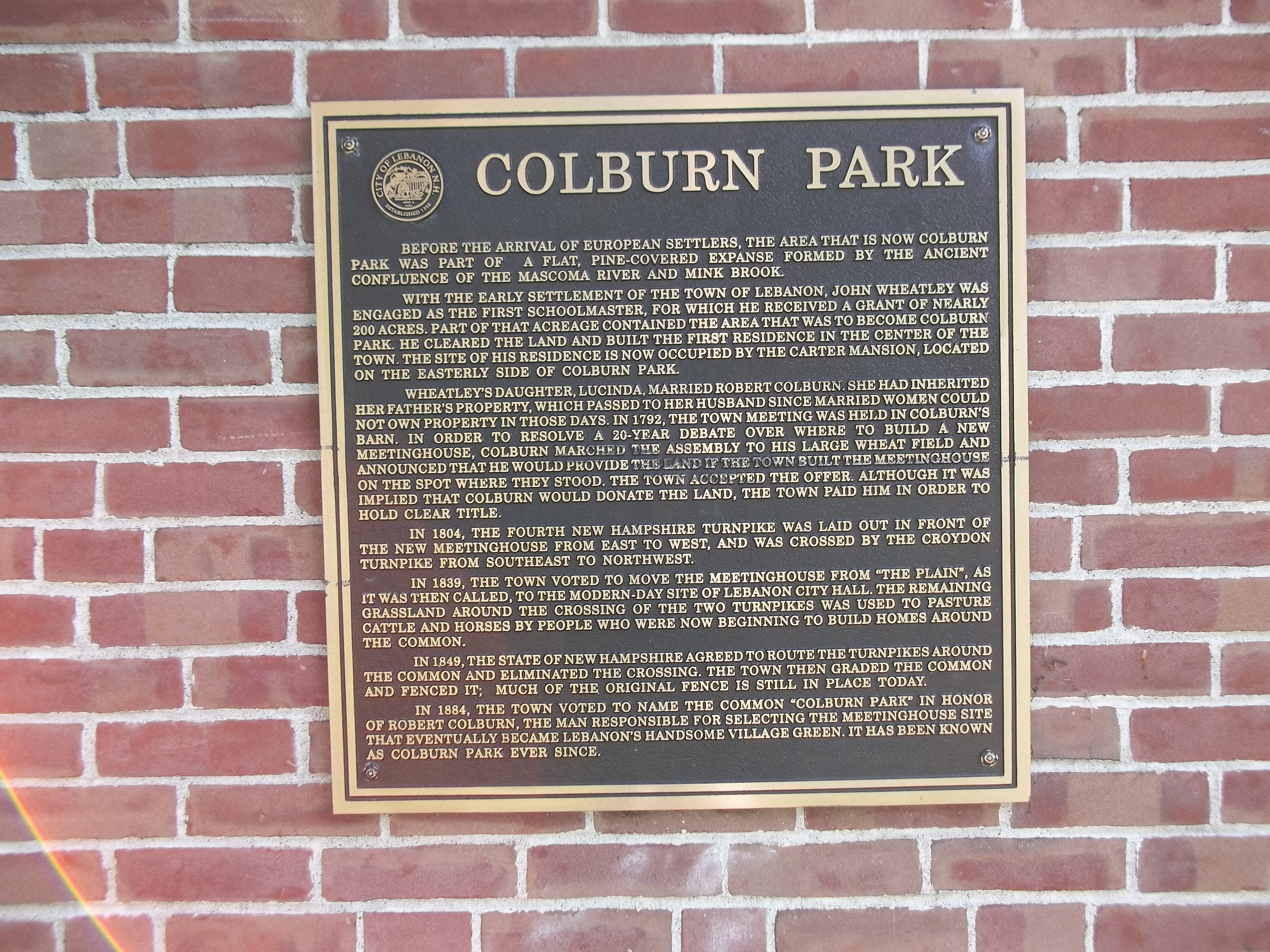
Plaque

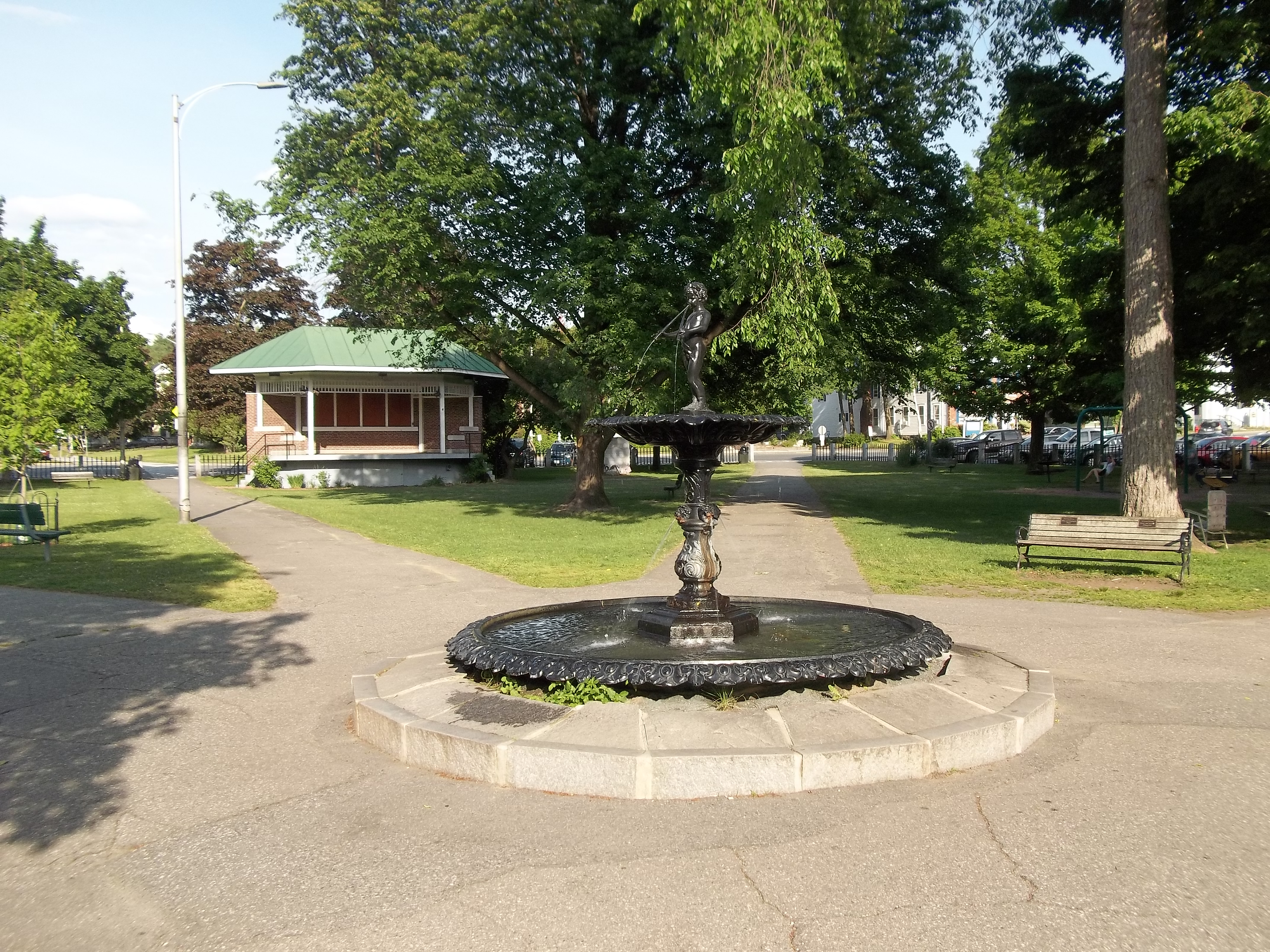
Fountain

== Notable people ==
- Carl S. Adams (1917–2019), politician
- Frederick C. Aldrich (1924–2018), politician
- Nick Alexander (born 1988), 2010 and 2014 US Olympic Team ski jumper
- Aaron Baddeley (born 1981), golfer with the PGA Tour; born in Lebanon
- Minnie Willis Baines Miller (1845–1923), author
- William Wallace Smith Bliss (1815–1853), army officer and mathematician
- Duane R. Bushey (born 1944), naval officer
- Thomas C. Chalmers (1917–1995), physician, researcher
- Benjamin Champney (1817–1907), landscape painter
- Harry Morrison Cheney (1860–1937), Speaker of New Hampshire House of Representatives
- Buff Cobb (1927–2010), actress and talk-show host
- Norris Cotton (1900–1989), US senator
- Aaron H. Cragin (1821–1898), politician
- Lane Dwinell (1906–1997), manufacturer
- Experience Estabrook (1813–1894), lawyer, politician
- Jeff Friedman (born 1950), poet
- Phineas Gage (1823–1860), railroad foreman, massive brain-injury survivor
- Arlie Latham (1860–1952), professional baseball player
- Jedediah Hyde Lathrop (1806–1889), merchant
- Charley Parkhurst (1812–1879), stagecoach driver
- Elisha Payne (1731–1807), businessman and politician
- George Halsey Perley (1857–1938), politician, diplomat
- Phineas Quimby (1802–1866), philosopher
- Colleen Randall (born 1952), artist
- Hezekiah Bradley Smith (1816–1887), inventor
- Joseph Smith (1805–1844), religious leader, founder of the Latter Day Saint movement
- George Storrs (1796–1879), writer who influenced many Christian denominations
- Sarah Strohmeyer (born 1962), author
- William Ticknor (1810–1864), publisher
- Mia Tyler (born 1978), model, actress
- Rob Woodward (born 1962), pitcher with the Boston Red Sox, radio host
- Ammi B. Young (1798–1874), architect
