= Ody =

Ody may refer to:

- Ody, a kind of magical amulets in Madagascar
- Ody Abbott (1888–1933), American baseball player
- Ody Alfa (born 1999), Nigerian footballer
- Ody J. Fish (1925–2007), American politician
- Ody Koopman (1902–1949), Dutch tennis player
- Ody vam Bruok (Gregor Köhne; born 1960), German writer

== See also ==
- Odi (disambiguation)
- Odie (disambiguation)
