= Dewey H. Reed =

American politician (1897–1966)

1957 portrait of Reed

Dewey H. Reed (July 21, 1897 – February 23, 1966) was an American educator and politician.

Reed was born in Raymond Township, Stearns County, Minnesota. He graduated from Sauk Centre High School in Sauk Centre, Minnesota, in 1916. Reed received his bachelor's degree from St. Cloud State University and taught in several high schools in Fairhaven, Minnesota, Bigfork, Minnesota, and Bovey, Minnesota. He then taught social studies in St. Cloud, Minnesota. Reed lived in St. Cloud, Minnesota with his wife and family. Reed served in the Minnesota House of Representatives from 1949 to 1960. Reed died at the St. Cloud Hospital, in St. Cloud, Minnesota on February 23, 1966 after suffering from a fall at his home on February 21, 1966. The funeral and burial was in St. Cloud, Minnesota.
