= Benjamin F. DuBois =

American politician (1915-2013)

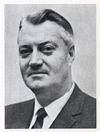
- DuBois, 63rd Minnesota Legislative Manual

Member of the Minnesota House of Representatives from the House 1963-66 (District 26); House 1967-68 (District 26B) district
- In office 1963-1969

Personal details
- Born: November 2, 1915 Sauk Centre, Minnesota, U.S.
- Died: January 7, 2013 (aged 97) Sauk Centre, Minnesota, U.S.
- Party: Nonpartisan Election-Liberal Caucus
- Spouse: Janet
- Children: 2
- Education: University of Harvard, School of Business Administration; College Graduate; Bank Seminar Course
- Occupation: banker

Benjamin Faville DuBois, Jr. (November 2, 1915 – January 7, 2013) was an American banker and politician.

Born in Sauk Centre, Minnesota, DuBois served in the United States Army and United States Navy. DuBois was a banker and worked at the First State Bank of Sauk Centre. He also worked for the Minnesota Banking Department. From 1941 to 1946, DuBois was the postmaster of Sauk Centre. From 1963 to 1969, he served in the Minnesota House of Representatives and was a Democrat. DuBois died in his native Sauk Centre, Minnesota, aged 97, and was survived by two daughters.
