= Terrence "Lee" Zehrer =

American businessman

Terrence "Lee" Zehrer, (born June 3, 1947, in Sauk Centre, Minnesota) is an American entrepreneur and internet pioneer. He is best known as the founder of the first picture personal online dating service, Kiss.com.

== Biography ==
Lee was raised on a dairy farm in rural Minnesota before entering the Navy and serving a tour of active duty in the Vietnam War. Upon returning to the states, he enrolled in St. Cloud State University and received a B.S. in Business Finance. Lee is a brother of Emmy nominated American film director, Paul Zehrer, Star Valley Flowers owner John Zehrer, and the uncle of former Kansas City Royals pitcher Zach Peterson. He currently resides in Las Vegas, Nevada.

== Kiss.com/Udate/Match.com ==
Lee registered and founded Kiss.com in 1994. Kiss became the first picture personals sites to reach a million registered members and saw 400 percent revenue growth in 1999. In 2001, Kiss.com merged with UK dating company, Udate.com, in a deal worth approximately $18 million in common stock and cash. After the acquisition, Lee sat on the board of directors as the majority stock holder for the conglomerate until in 2003, when IAC/InterActiveCorp acquired Udate/Kiss and merged to form what is now Match.com in a deal worth approximately $150 million. Kiss.com has since dissolved as a part of IAC's personals business which includes Match.com and Chemistry.com.

== Philanthropy ==
Lee is now a philanthropist, investor, and business advisor. He is a large donor/contributor to the Libertarian Party, Allen Institute for Brain Science, the Freedom From Religion Foundation, and the Methuselah Foundation.
