= Ben Mazer =

American poet and editor (born 1964)

Ben Mazer (born 1964 in New York City) is an American poet and editor.

== Life ==
Mazer was born in New York City and raised in the Cambridge, Massachusetts area. He studied under Seamus Heaney and William Alfred at Harvard University. Following graduation, he entered the Editorial Institute at Boston University to focus on textual scholarship.

Mazer is the editor of the Battersea Review. He lives in Cambridge.

== Publications ==
As poet:

- White Cities (Barbara Matteau Editions, 1995)
- Johanna Poems (Cy Gist Press, 2007)
- The Foundations of Poetry Mathematics (Cannibal Books, 2008; 2009)
- Poems (Pen & Anvil Press, 2010)
- January 2008 (Dark Sky Books, 2010)
- A City of Angels: A Verse Play in Three Acts (Cy Gist Press, 2011)
- Tales of the Buckman Tavern (Poetrywala, 2012)
- New Poems (Pen & Anvil Press, 2013)
- The Glass Piano (MadHat Press, 2015)
- December Poems (Pen & Anvil Press, 2016)
- February Poems (Ilora Press, 2017)
- Selected Poems (MadHat Press, 2017)
- Te conozco? (Universidad Nacional Autónoma de México, 2018). Bilingual edition with translations into Spanish by Mario Murgia.
- The Hierarchy of the Pavilions (MadHat Press, 2020)
- The Ruined Millionaire: New Selected Poems: 2002-2022 (MadHat Press, 2023)
- The Ruined Millionaire: New Selected Poems: 2002-2022 (Poetrywala, 2023)

As editor:

- Landis Everson’s Everything Preserved: Poems 1955–2005 (Graywolf Press, 2006), winner of the Poetry Foundation's first Emily Dickinson Award.
- Selected Poems of Frederick Goddard Tuckerman (Harvard University Press, 2010)
- Hart Crane. The Bridge: The Uncollected Version, from Periodicals and Anthologies, 1927-1930 (MadHat Press, 2015)
- The Collected Poems of John Crowe Ransom (Un-Gyve Press, 2015)
- The Uncollected Delmore Schwartz (Arrowsmith Press, 2019)
- Harry Crosby. Selected Poems (MadHat Press, 2020)
- Thomas Sayers Ellis, Mexico: Photographs (Art and Letters, 2021)
- Ruth Lepson, on the way: new and selected poems (MadHat Press, 2021)
- The Collected Poems of Delmore Schwartz (Farrar, Straus and Giroux, 2024)
- With Blake Campbell. An Anthology of the Berkeley Renaissance. (MadHat Press, 2026)

Books About:

- Thomas Graves. Ben Mazer and the New Romanticism (Spuyten Duyvil, 2021)
