= Jeff Friedman =

American poet and professor

- Born: 1950 (age 75–76); Chicago, Illinois, U.S.
- Education: University of Missouri; Macalester College; University of Iowa
- Spouse: Colleen Randall
- Writing career
- Genres: Verse and prose poetry, flash fiction, translation
- Notable awards: National Endowment for the Arts, New Hampshire State Arts Council, Milton Dorfman Poetry Prize
- Website: Jeff Friedman

Jeff Friedman (born 1950) is an American poet and educator. He is known for his lyrical narrative verse rooted in autobiographical experience and for his later fabulist prose poetry and flash fiction which interweave the fantastical and the ordinary. In a review of Friedman's collection Floating Tales (2017), poet and critic Walter Bargen wrote that the author "assembles fantastic tales only to disassemble them, then reassemble them into even more impossible worlds, and yet the reader will find her-or himself believing in their possibilities and often laughing along the way." Friedman is the author of nine collections of poetry and prose, which include Black Threads (2007), Working in Flour (2011), Pretenders (2014), The Marksman (2020), and the microfiction collection, The House of Grana Padano (2022), co-written with Meg Pokrass. He lives in West Lebanon, New Hampshire with his wife, painter Colleen Randall.

== Early life and career ==
Friedman was born in 1950 in Chicago, Illinois, the youngest of three children, and grew up in St. Louis, Missouri. His father was a traveling salesman in the garment industry and his mother the owner of a dress shop in downtown St. Louis. Throughout the 1970s, Friedman wrote short stories and poems. He studied with poet Howard Schwartz in 1971 at the University of Missouri before earning a BA degree in English from Macalester College in Minnesota in 1975. After graduating, he applied and was accepted to the creative writing program at the University of Missouri-Columbia (MA, 1978), where he studied poetry writing with the poet Larry Levis. In 1978, he was awarded a Teaching-Writing Fellowship at the Iowa Writers' Workshop at the University of Iowa. He earned an MFA in Poetry Writing in 1980.

Friedman's poetry began to be published in the late 1970s and early 1980s in literary journals such as Poetry, The Missouri Review and Ironwood. His poems, mini-stories and translations have since appeared in American Poetry Review, Fiction International, Poetry, Flash Fiction Funny, Hotel Amerika, New England Review, North American Review, Plume, Poetry, Poetry International and The New Republic, among others, and in anthologies including Best Microfiction 2021, Best Microfiction 2022, Cast-Iron Aeroplanes That Can Actually Fly: Commentaries from 80 American Poets on their Prose Poetry (2019), and Dreaming Awake: New Contemporary Prose Poetry from the United States, Australia, and the United Kingdom (2023). His first book of poetry, The Record-Breaking Heat Wave, was published in 1986, followed by the collections Scattering the Ashes (1998) and Taking Down the Angel (2003). In addition to his six later books (including most recently The Marksman and Floating Tales), he has published two books of translations: Memorials by Polish poet Mieczysław Jastrun (with Dzvinia Orlowsky) and Two Gardens: Modern Hebrew Poems of the Bible (with Nati Zohar).

Friedman taught creative writing at Keene State College in New Hampshire from 1994 to 2021, and poetry at New England College from 2002 to 2009.

== Work and reception ==
Friedman's verse poetry focused on timeless themes and images grounded in experience: the failures of the family and the American dream, human fallibility, working life, romantic relationships, beauty and loss, and the potency of memory. Critics noted in these poems a strong sense of place and character, a "rueful lyricism," and a language and tone described as straightforward and accessible, compassionate, honest, unsentimental, and often penetrating. Friedman's later prose poetry and micro-fiction center on tragicomic parables involving surreal dialogues, actions and situations rooted in imagination, which often displace contemporary psychological, political and existential questions in order to comment on them more fully or obliquely. Reviewers distinguish this work by its comedic hyperbole and pacing, metamorphic quality, irony and social critique. Throughout both periods of his career, Friedman has written midrashic poems that reinterpret biblical stories in order to contextualize his personal and social themes in a larger world of myth and Judaic heritage.

=== Verse ===
Critics have suggested that the primary subject of Friedman's early poetry collections, Scattering the Ashes (1998), Taking Down the Angel (2003) and Black Threads (2007), was a bildungsroman-like exploration of self-development through early schooling and work experience, sexual awakening, and apprehension of the humanity of his parents. The latter two books mixed secular and religious impulses displaying both political consciousness and scorching humor (e.g., "The Golem in the Suburbs," "Night of the Rabbi"), as well as more difficult themes involving death, loss, family conflict and bitterness. Taking Down the Angel was noted for its vivid, dynamic sense of lyric, self-propelled narratives, and use of biblical and literary references; the two poems bookending the collection recalled Death of a Salesman in their portrayals of Friedman's father as an icon of the American work ethic and its disappointments. Critic William Doreski described the poetic idiom of Black Threads as "shaped by the stern notes of the Torah and the casualness of the quotidian … a model of secular redemption from the burdens of family, self and religion through appreciation of the finely textured material and social world."

With Working in Flour (2011), Friedman took on a more surrealist mode that would continue into his later work, introducing vigorous, earthy imagery involving animals and flowers, food and appetites, as well as lovers and family figures. Reviewers described Friedman's poems as celebratory comic parables embracing hope amid the vicissitudes of life with an often rebellious, iconoclastic or unrepentant attitude (e.g., "I Did It" and "Cashing In").

=== Prose poetry and micro-fiction ===
In 2009, Friedman began producing prose poems rooted more in imagination and magical realism than experience. They were first collected in Pretenders (2014), a book that gave witness to a fractured and corrupt postmodern world through an absurdist outlook that both skewered and accepted the world’s foibles. The metamorphic transformations of its fables and mini-tales—across human, animal and inanimate-object realms (e.g., "Bear Fight," "Pill")—twisted logic and convention beyond resolution toward larger, unexpected contexts of meaning and interpretation, often sardonic commentaries on sex, human frailty and capitalism ("Money," "Brokers"). Poetry International compared the stories to the fables of Kafka, Miłosz, Aesop and La Fontaine, noting a "gentle balancing between light and dark, serious and playful" through which Friedman delved into human isolation, desire, inadequacy and guilt.

In Floating Tales (2017), Friedman offered prose mini-stories and comic sketches similarly influenced by Kafka, fabulists and biblical writers, as well as Zbigniew Herbert, which interwove absurd, mundane and oneiric worlds. These stories often rendered the figurative literal, taking the results to logical, if surreal, conclusions that—no matter how strange—were believable due to the work's plain, rational language, keenly observed detail and physical grounding. Walter Bargen characterized Friedman's vision as one of a "nonlinear, non-logical, out-of-balanced world, a world without a center of gravity," that liberated readers "through yet to be discovered possibilities," absurd truths and a celebration of the imagination. Daniel Lawless described the book as "a 'trip' sans pharmaceuticals whose only side-effects will be a permanently if subtly skewed sense of the possibilities of the world."

Friedman's microfiction collaboration with Meg Pokrass, The House of Grana Padano (2022), continued to draw on the tropes and approaches of his previous two works. Critic Celia Bland called the collection an "entertainingly believable" mix of hysterical concepts and farfetched actions with "the death-defying concision of a highwire act."

== Recognition ==
Friedman has won a National Endowment for the Arts fellowship for translation (with Dzvinia Orlowsky, 2016), fellowships from the New Hampshire State Arts Council (2003, 1993), a Milton Dorfman Poetry Prize (1998), and an editor's prize from The Missouri Review (1993). He has had residencies at MacDowell Colony, the Vermont Studio Center, Virginia Center for the Creative Arts, the University of Missouri-St. Louis, and Yaddo.

== Bibliography ==
=== Poetry ===
- The House of Grana Padano, with Meg Pokrass, (Pelekinesis, 2022)
- The Marksman (Carnegie Mellon University Press, 2020)
- Floating Tales (Plume Editions/MadHat Press, 2017)
- Pretenders (Carnegie Mellon University Press, 2014)
- Working in Flour (Carnegie Mellon University Press, 2011)
- Black Threads (Carnegie Mellon University Press, 2007)
- Taking Down the Angel (Carnegie Mellon University Press, 2003)
- Scattering the Ashes (Carnegie Mellon University Press, 1998)
- The Record-Breaking Heat Wave (BkMk Press, 1986)

=== Translations ===
- Two Gardens: Hebrew Poems of the Bible, trans. with Nati Zohar (Singing Bone Press 2016)
- Mieczyslaw Jastrun, Memorials: A Selection, trans. with Dzvinia Orlowsky (Dialogos/Lavender Ink 2014)
