= Sally Connolly =

British writer and academic (born 1976)

- Born: May 20, 1976; St. Albans, England
- Died: September 25, 2025 (aged 49); Market Harborough, Leicestershire, U.K.
- Other name: Saidhbhe Ní Conghalaigh
- Occupations: Academic, literary critic
- Awards: Kennedy Scholarship

Academic background
- Education: University College London; Harvard University
- Alma mater: University College London (BA, MA, PhD)

Academic work
- Discipline: Literary Criticism
- Sub-discipline: Poetry
- Institutions: University of Houston
- Main interests: Elegy, Prosody and Metre (poetry), Literary Representations of Disaster, Modernist Epic poetry, New Formalism, Poetic Influence.

Sally Connolly (Irish, Saidhbhe Ní Conghalaigh, 20 May 1976–25 September 2025), was a writer and academic.

== Life ==
Sally Connolly attended St Albans School, Hertfordshire, where her teachers included the poet John Mole, and University College London and Harvard University, where she was a Kennedy Scholar. She studied for her doctorate under the supervision of the poet Mark Ford and at Harvard with Helen Vendler and Seamus Heaney. She published widely on twentieth- and twenty-first century British, Irish and American Poetry and was a practitioner of the school of close, attentive reading espoused by critics such as Vendler, Peter Sacks, and Christopher Ricks.

She was Martha Gano Houstoun Research Professor of English Literature at The University of Houston. Her 2016 book Grief and Meter is the first in the field of elegy studies to consider elegies for poets as a significant elegiac subgenre for which she coins the term "genealogical elegies." The British critic John Sutherland (author) describes Grief and Meter as "unusually thought provoking" and praises her "refreshingly sharp close readings". Matthew Creasy writes in a review in This Year's Work in English Studies (Oxford) that Grief and Meter is an "eloquent and finely observed study of the elegy for a poet as a genre, a mode and, above all, a form. Her introduction begins with Auden, and Connolly devotes a chapter to reading ‘In Memory of W.B Yeats’ as ‘the touchstone genealogical elegy of the twentieth century and beyond’. Subsequent chapters explore the working out of Auden’s influence in poetry by Joseph Brodsky, John Berryman, Robert Lowell, and Seamus Heaney. This choice of poets reveals Connolly’s opening image of Auden on the steamship to America in January 1939 as a kind of conceptual pun for her interest in transatlantic poetics. As well as a lively account of elegiac form that draws on well-established work in this area by Peter Sacks, Connolly also offers her deft close readings as a corrective to the ‘distant reading’ of genres and forms offered by Franco Moretti and others."

In relation to her second book Ranches of Isolation, Stephanie Burt writes that Connolly "has a sharp ear for how poetry sounds, for where it originates and where it ends up, and she’s in a good position to say, not just thanks to her knowledge of things Irish and Irish English and British English and American, but thanks to her knowledge about the guts of poems: past and present, early-career and deeply canonical, out-there and close to the heart, outspoken and close to the vest, get attention in Connolly’s personal, thoughtful, pellucid language. The Anglophone world needs more poetry critics so careful, so thoughtful, so able to speak their minds."

Connolly was a contributor to the Times Literary Supplement, Poetry (magazine) and The London Evening Standard.

== Selected works ==
- "Ranches of Isolation: Transatlantic Poetry", (MadHat Press, 2018)
- "Transatlantic Poetics: An Autobiography", Plume Poetry, 2017
- "Two Genealogical Elegies for Seamus Heaney", Literary Imagination (Oxford University Press, 2017)
- "Grief and Meter: Elegies for Poets after Auden", (University of Virginia Press, 2016)
- "Breaking Bread With the Dead: W. H. Auden, Seamus Heaney and Yeats's Influence", Yeats Annual 17, Palgrave MacMillan
