= MadHat Press =

MadHat Press is an American and international book-publishing company located in Cambridge, Massachusetts.

== History ==
MadHat was founded in 2010 by poets Carol Novack and Marc Vincenz as a platform for new American and international writing. At first, MadHat published a poetry magazine, MadHatters' Review that has later grown into a poetry press. Writing about MadHatters' Review in PiF Magazine, poet Kristina Marie Darling noted that it "provides a unique forum for writers to experiment with form, narrative, and the relationship between text and other mediums."

After Carol Novack's death that occurred in December 2011, Marc Vincenz has become editor-in-chief.

In an interview with American Book Review, he outlined the magazine's editorial policy:

MadHat publishes work that stretches imaginative and structural boundaries. We lean toward passionate, lyrical and explosive work, well-crafted and somewhat cerebral

The press had an imprint, Plume Editions edited by the poet Daniel Lawless. This imprint is now defunct. More recently, the press has also started publishing fiction and criticism.

== Notable writers published by the press ==
- Michael Anania
- Robert Archambeau
- Tom Bradley
- Maxine Chernoff
- Sally Connolly
- David Dephy
- Jeff Friedman
- Tess Gallagher
- DeWitt Henry
- Paul Hoover
- Andrew Joron
- John Kinsella
- Anatoly Kudryavitsky
- Ben Mazer
- Albert Mobilio
- Michael Rothenberg
- Larissa Shmailo
- John Warner Smith
- John Yau
