= Colleen Randall =

American painter

- Born: 1952; Sauk Centre, Minnesota, U.S.
- Education: Queens College, University of Iowa, Macalester College
- Known for: Painting, works on paper
- Spouse: Jeff Friedman

Colleen Randall, Splendid Matter, oil on canvas, 72" x 65", 2018.

Colleen Randall (born 1952) is an American abstract painter and art educator. Her work is rooted in the abstract expressionist and sublime traditions and the relationship between nature and human consciousness. Art historian Sarah G. Powers has written, "Like seasonal and climatic shifts, Randall's work responds to nature and weather patterns through materiality and form. As meditations on the impact of sublime natural forces, her paintings transport us from the material fact of painted marks on a surface to a rich and rewarding imaginative experience." Randall has exhibited at the National Academy of Design and The Painting Center in New York, the Hood Museum of Art, and Delaware Art Museum, among other venues. She lives and works in West Lebanon, New Hampshire with her husband, poet and professor Jeff Friedman, and teaches at Dartmouth College.

== Education and career ==
Randall was born in 1952 in Sauk Centre, Minnesota and was raised in suburban Minneapolis, the eldest of six children of two teachers. During childhood, the rugged natural beauty and dramatic seasonal changes of the nearby St. Croix River Valley made a strong impact on her that has remained an influence on her art. After receiving a BA in art history from Macalester College in 1975, she moved with Friedman to study painting at the University of Iowa, where she earned a BFA (1980) and was influenced by the work of abstract expressionists Jackson Pollock, Willem and Elaine de Kooning and Franz Kline.

In the early 1980s, they moved to New York City, where Randall studied a wide range of approaches at Queens College (MFA, 1983) under the painters Rosemarie Beck, Louis Finkelstein, Clinton Hill and Harry Kramer. After graduating, Randall began exhibiting professionally, appearing in group shows at the Albrecht-Kemper Museum of Art, Springfield Art Museum, and Vermont Studio Center, and featured exhibitions at Kenkeleba Gallery (1987) and the Hood Museum of Art (1989), among others. That same year, she started teaching at Dartmouth College, where she served as an art professor for over thirty years and as chair of studio art at various points.

In her later career, Randall has had solo exhibitions at The Painting Center (New York), Spheris Gallery (New York and New Hampshire), Elliot Smith Contemporary Art (St. Louis), Dartmouth, and the Hood Museum of Art, among other venues.

== Work and reception ==
Colleen Randall, Mercurial, oil on canvas, 82" x 75", 1999.

Critics have described Randall's work as deeply Romantic and connected it to the sublime tradition of abstract artists such as Mark Rothko, Clyfford Still and Helen Frankenthaler, and earlier landscape painters like J. M. W. Turner and Frederic Church. Her approach combines abstract expressionist color-field and gestural techniques within a meticulous, additive process that mimics the sedimentary layering of material in nature. She lets each day's work dry, allowing the layers to build in a language of rhythm and repetition that has been described as "an archiving of temporality" in paint. The resulting, highly textured surfaces vary from thick impastos to sculptural brushstrokes to thin veils of color. In an Artcritical review, Nicholas Lamia wrote that in spite of the dramatic weight and volume of paint, her "massive pigment load and heavy textures often become atmospheric" and impart "a feeling of spirituality despite their connections to earthly, geological activity."

=== Early work ===
Randall's early work explored connections between memories of landscape and abstraction. It was characterized by her use of dark, luminous colors (redolent of the materials of pigment), large tonal masses, and textures often enhanced by mixing sawdust and marble dust into the oil paint. In a 1992 Philadelphia Inquirer review, Victoria Donohoe wrote, "Randall's paintings are besotted with light [and] the vicissitudes of stroke and counterstroke," with surfaces that mixed buoyant transparency and buttery density, gestural drips, and thick lunges of paint recalling the work of Hans Hofmann. According to Art New England, the work in Randall's "The Freedom to Create" exhibition (New Hampshire Institute of Art, 1996) gained emotional strength through its dialogue of opposites: warm versus cool; dark versus light; smooth versus rough; swirling gesture against subtly modulated fields; and complementary hues.

=== Later work ===
At Dartmouth College in 2001, Randall presented paintings employing a limited palette described in a review as "musty khaki, creamed coffee and tree bark," with hints beneath of prussian blue, earthy greens, coppery blues, and greens. Robert Garlitz wrote that the rich mix of thick paint, layers of glazing, splatters, drips, and interwoven filaments suggested the tangle of bare woods in November, as well as moss, rock outcroppings, and granite; of the exhibition, he observed that the work initially appeared flat, but in concert, "created an interior light, screens or 'chambers' of dusky meditative light within the 'white cube' of the gallery ... transforming the space into a chapel or meditative space (sacred)." In a 2005 review of Randall's Painting Center show, Artcritical likened a similar play of textures and color eruptions to "liquid tectonic quilts" with new layers threatening to bubble forth.

Colleen Randall, Inflorescence#32, oil on canvas, 44" x 58", 2007.

Her later work has been described as more ethereal and focused on expressing states of being and the interplay of light through paint. Works exhibited at Dartmouth ("Livia's Walls", 2009) and The Painting Center (2012) were inspired by garden paintings from the ancient Roman Villa of Livia, which she studied during a Whiting Foundation travel fellowship. Her "Intimations" and "Immanence" series (2012–6) investigated space and light, particularly a sense of inner, radiant light. Boston Globe critic Cate McQuaid described Immanence 4 as "a rocky impasto, earthbound save for its crepuscular colors, tangerine and periwinkle ... [its] paint growing thready, dissolving like spun cotton candy.

Randall's 2020 exhibition, "In the Midst of Something Splendid" (Hood Museum of Art), included "Immanence" works, paintings inspired by the abundance and fertility of Colorado landscapes, and the black-and-white, acrylic "Syncope" series; the latter was named after a Catherine Clément philosophical book, which related states of rapture caused by temporary loss of consciousness (e.g., fainting) to similar effects caused by the arts. Reviews described the show's oil paintings as awash in gold, blue, and crimson color fields, with shifting textures, shades, and light that created a mesmerizing sense of motion, ranging from meditative to roiling.

== Recognition ==
Randall has received awards from the National Academy of Design, Andrew W. Mellon Foundation, and Marion and Jasper Whiting Foundation. She has been awarded artist residencies by Yaddo, MacDowell, Millay Colony for the Arts, Virginia Center for the Creative Arts and Landfall Trust (Newfoundland), among others.
