= Sauk Centre, Minnesota =

City in Minnesota, United States

Sauk Centre
- City
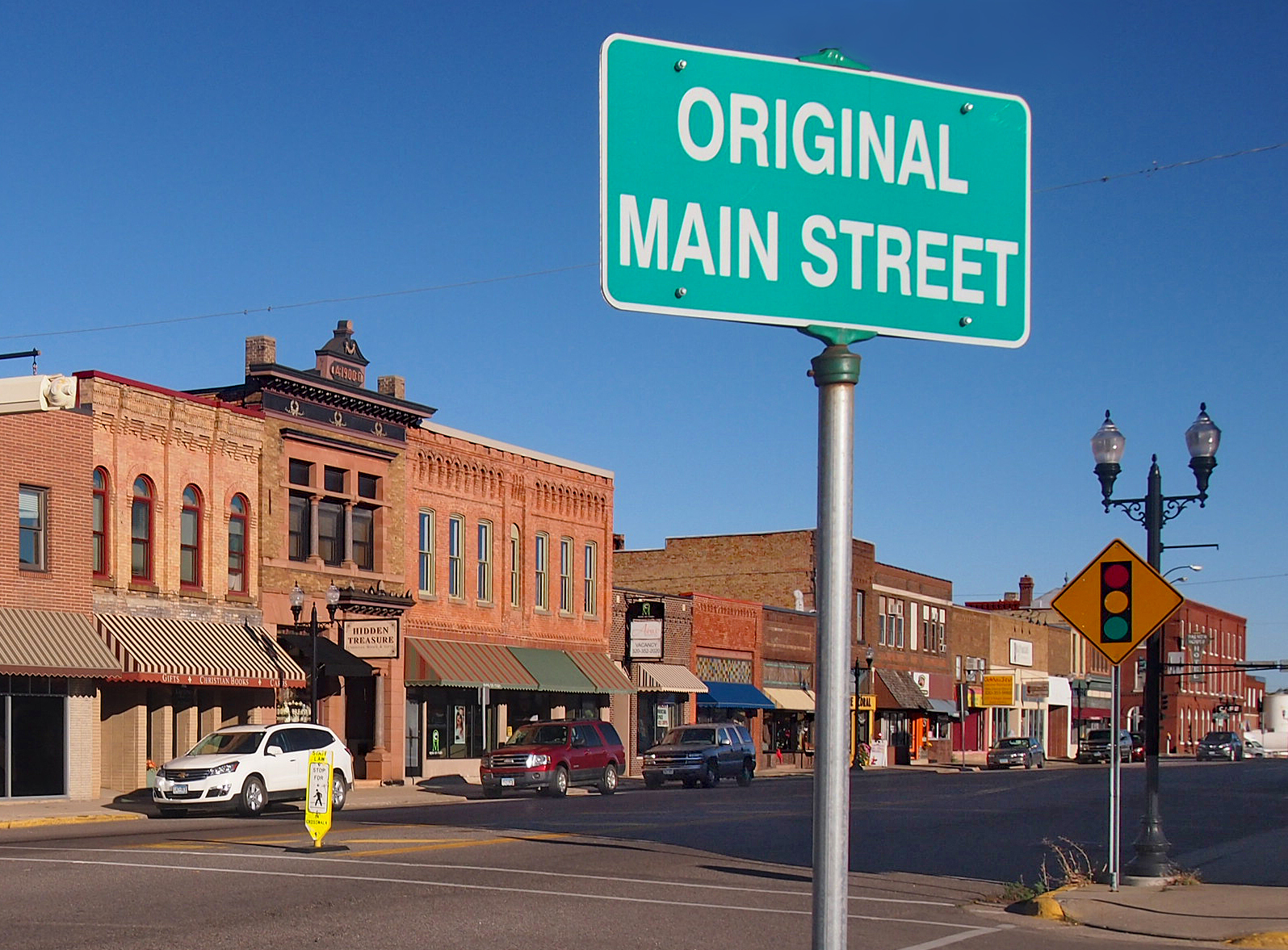
- The "Original Main Street" in downtown Sauk Centre

- Location of Sauk Centre within Stearns County, Minnesota
- Coordinates: 45°44′09″N 94°57′08″W
- Country: United States
- State: Minnesota
- County: Stearns
- Settled: 1856
- Founded: 1863
- Incorporated (village): 1876
- Incorporated (city): 1889

Government
  - Mayor: Warren Stone

Area
  - Total: 4.08 sq mi (10.58 km^{2})
  - Land: 4.08 sq mi (10.57 km^{2})
  - Water: 0.0039 sq mi (0.01 km^{2})
- Elevation: 1,250 ft (380 m)

Population (2020)
  - Total: 4,555
  - Estimate (2021): 4,599
  - Density: 1,116.1/sq mi (430.91/km^{2})
- Time zone: UTC-6 (CST)
  - Summer (DST): UTC-5 (CDT)
- ZIP code: 56378
- Area code: 320
- FIPS code: 27-58648
- GNIS feature ID: 2396541
- Website: saukcentremn.gov

Sauk Centre (/sɔːk/ SAWK) is a city in Stearns County, Minnesota, United States. The population was 4,555 at the 2020 census. Sauk Centre is part of the St. Cloud metropolitan area.

Sauk Centre is the birthplace of Sinclair Lewis, a novelist and winner of the Nobel Prize in Literature. It inspired his fictional Gopher Prairie, the setting of Lewis's 1920 novel Main Street. There are two sculptures of Lewis in Sauk Centre, one life size sculpture just outside the public library named after him, and a bust, sculpted by Joseph Kiselewski, inside the library.

== History ==
The town was originally named by a lottery. The eight original town shareholders submitted suggestions for a name, and Sauk Centre was selected. The name was submitted by Alexander Moore, who originally bought and platted the town. Sauk refers to the many place names associated with the Sauk tribe (Sauk River, Sauk Rapids, Little Sauk, Osakis, etc). Centre (the British spelling of "center") refers to the town's central location between Sauk Rapids and Lake Osakis. When the Sauk Centre post office was established, it used the spelling "Sauk Center", until 1936 when the city won its fight to spell the name as Moore suggested. Local lore has it that five refugees from the Sauk tribe had been killed by settlers in an ambush on the shores of Lake Osakis 17 miles (27 km) away.

== Attractions ==
Sauk Centre contains the Sinclair Lewis Boyhood Home, a National Historic Landmark. Two other properties and a historic district are listed on the National Register of Historic Places: The Palmer House built in 1901 and expanded in 1916, the Minnesota Home School for Girls built 1911–1935, and the Original Main Street Historic District built 1920–1947. Viking Altar Rock is a local landmark.

== Annual Events ==
- Snofest in January
- Farm Toy Show
- Spring Out
- Concerts in the Park
- Sinclair Lewis Days
- Stearns County Fair, August
- Nest Fest, August
- Time Travelers Trek, September
- Sauk Centre Festival of the Arts, September

== Geography ==
According to the United States Census Bureau, the city has a total area of 4.25 square miles (11.01 km^{2}); 3.99 square miles (10.33 km^{2}) is land and 0.26 square miles (0.67 km^{2}) is water.

Sauk Centre is located along Interstate 94/U.S. Highway 52, U.S. Highway 71, and Minnesota State Highway 28. It is approximately 100 miles (160 km) northwest of the Minneapolis/Saint Paul metropolitan area.

The city is considered to be in the middle of the state. Sauk Lake and Sauk River are the most notable water features of the area. Fairy Lake and Lily Lake are located just outside of the city limits.

== Demographics ==
Historical population
Census	Pop.	Note	%±
1880	1,201		—
1890	1,695		41.1%
1900	2,220		31.0%
1910	2,154		−3.0%
1920	2,699		25.3%
1930	2,716		0.6%
1940	3,016		11.0%
1950	3,140		4.1%
1960	3,573		13.8%
1970	3,750		5.0%
1980	3,709		−1.1%
1990	3,581		−3.5%
2000	3,930		9.7%
2010	4,317		9.8%
2020	4,555		5.5%
2021 (est.)	4,599		1.0%
U.S. Decennial Census; 2020 Census

=== 2020 census ===
As of the 2020 census, Sauk Centre had a population of 4,555. The median age was 41.2 years. 22.6% of residents were under the age of 18 and 24.2% of residents were 65 years of age or older. For every 100 females there were 98.2 males, and for every 100 females age 18 and over there were 96.1 males age 18 and over.

99.8% of residents lived in urban areas, while 0.2% lived in rural areas.

There were 1,887 households in Sauk Centre, of which 27.7% had children under the age of 18 living in them. Of all households, 46.1% were married-couple households, 17.7% were households with a male householder and no spouse or partner present, and 29.2% were households with a female householder and no spouse or partner present. About 33.8% of all households were made up of individuals and 18.7% had someone living alone who was 65 years of age or older.

There were 2,025 housing units, of which 6.8% were vacant. The homeowner vacancy rate was 1.7% and the rental vacancy rate was 8.4%.

Racial composition as of the 2020 census
Race	Number	Percent
White	4,042	88.7%
Black or African American	37	0.8%
American Indian and Alaska Native	16	0.4%
Asian	17	0.4%
Native Hawaiian and Other Pacific Islander	1	0.0%
Some other race	190	4.2%
Two or more races	252	5.5%
Hispanic or Latino (of any race)	402	8.8%

=== 2010 census ===
As of the census of 2010, there were 4,317 people, 1,851 households, and 1,174 families living in the city. The population density was 1,082.0 inhabitants per square mile (417.8/km^{2}). There were 1,994 housing units at an average density of 499.7 per square mile (192.9/km^{2}). The racial makeup of the city was 95.6% White, 0.8% African American, 0.1% Native American, 0.3% Asian, 2.2% from other races, and 0.9% from two or more races. Hispanic or Latino of any race were 4.4% of the population.

There were 1,851 households, of which 28.4% had children under the age of 18 living with them, 50.5% were married couples living together, 9.4% had a female householder with no husband present, 3.6% had a male householder with no wife present, and 36.6% were non-families. 32.1% of all households were made up of individuals, and 18% had someone living alone who was 65 years of age or older. The average household size was 2.28 and the average family size was 2.86.

The median age in the city was 41.4 years. 22.9% of residents were under the age of 18; 8.2% were between the ages of 18 and 24; 22.8% were from 25 to 44; 24.3% were from 45 to 64; and 21.6% were 65 years of age or older. The gender makeup of the city was 47.4% male and 52.6% female.

=== 2000 census ===
As of the census of 2000, there were 3,930 people, 1,616 households, and 1,042 families living in the city. The population density was 1,057.2 inhabitants per square mile (408.2/km^{2}). There were 1,709 housing units at an average density of 459.7 per square mile (177.5/km^{2}). The racial makeup of the city was 98.68% White, 0.31% African American, 0.13% Native American, 0.25% Asian, 0.25% from other races, and 0.38% from two or more races. Hispanic or Latino of any kind were 0.53% of the population.

There were 1,616 households, out of which 30.4% had children under the age of 18 living with them, 53.0% were married couples living together, 8.5% had a female householder with no husband present, and 35.5% were non-families. 31.4% of all households were made up of individuals, and 17.8% had someone living alone who was 65 years of age or older. The average household size was 2.38 and the average family size was 3.01.

In the city, the population was spread out, with 25.6% under the age of 18, 8.2% from 18 to 24, 25.1% from 25 to 44, 18.6% from 45 to 64, and 22.5% who were 65 years of age or older. The median age was 39 years. For every 100 females, there were 89.4 males. For every 100 females age 18 and over, there were 85.4 males.

The median income for a household in the city was $37,644, and the median income for a family was $47,623. Males had a median income of $33,382 versus $20,399 for females. The per capita income for the city was $18,390. About 2.3% of families and 5.2% of the population were below the poverty line, including 2.9% of those under age 18 and 8.0% of those age 65 or over.

== Churches ==
- Center for Christ
- Church of the Good Samaritan
- Faith Baptist Church
- First Lutheran ELCA
- Kingdom Hall of Jehovah's Witnesses
- Our Lady of the Angels, Irish Catholic Church
- River of Life Church
- Saint Paul's German Catholic Church (home of the first U.S. shrine dedicated to the Divine Mercy of Jesus, dedicated 1982)
- Tierra Prometida - Assemble of God Church
- United Methodist Church
- Zion Lutheran Church LCMS

== Notable people ==
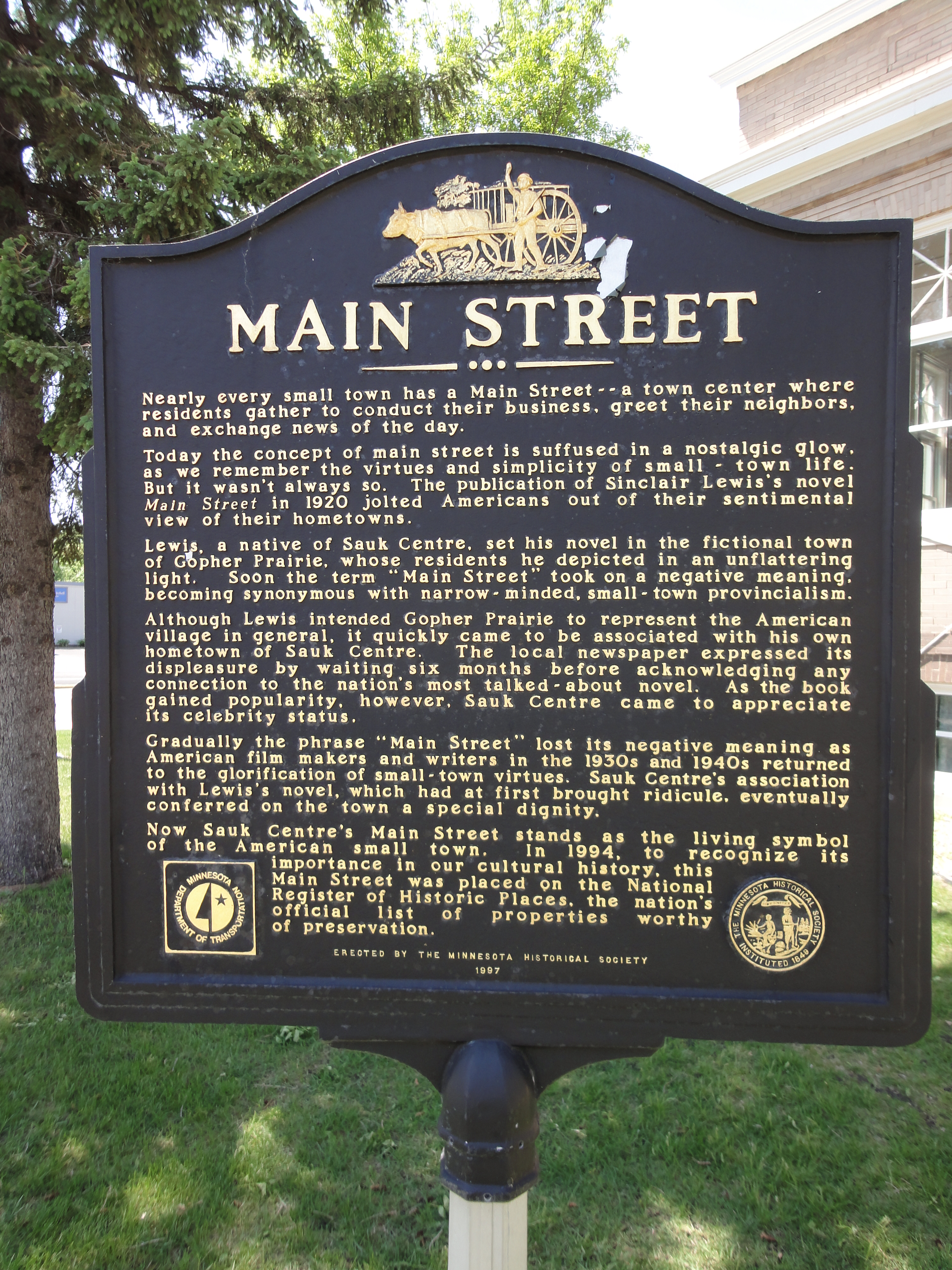
A sign in front of the library discusses Sinclair Lewis's Main Street

- Alphonso Barto — Minnesota legislator and seventh Lieutenant Governor of Minnesota
- Joshua Harrison Bruce — farmer and Minnesota legislator
- Benjamin F. DuBois — banker and Minnesota legislator
- Frank Eddy — US representative
- Rachael Ellering — professional wrestler
- Ody J. Fish — Chairman of the Republican Party of Wisconsin
- Mark Gleason — State representative
- James Hendryx — author of Western fiction
- Larry Herke — colonel in National Guard, MDVA commissioner
- Harold Palmer Howard, U.S. Army brigadier general
- Vi June — Mayor and state representative in Colorado
- Sinclair Lewis — novelist and playwright, 1930 Nobel Prize winner in Literature
- Joseph T. Niehaus, Sr. — farmer, businessman, beekeeper, and Minnesota legislator
- Mark Pavelich — professional hockey player
- Colleen Randall — abstract painter and art educator
- Dewey H. Reed — educator and Minnesota representative
- Christine Reitsma — Princess Kay of the Milky Way
- Cory Undlin — NFL Coach
- Sylvester Uphus — farmer and Minnesota legislator
- Harry C. Van Norman — businessman and Illinois legislator
- Paul Zehrer — film and TV director, writer, producer, and editor
- Terrence "Lee" Zehrer — entrepreneur and internet pioneer

== Education ==
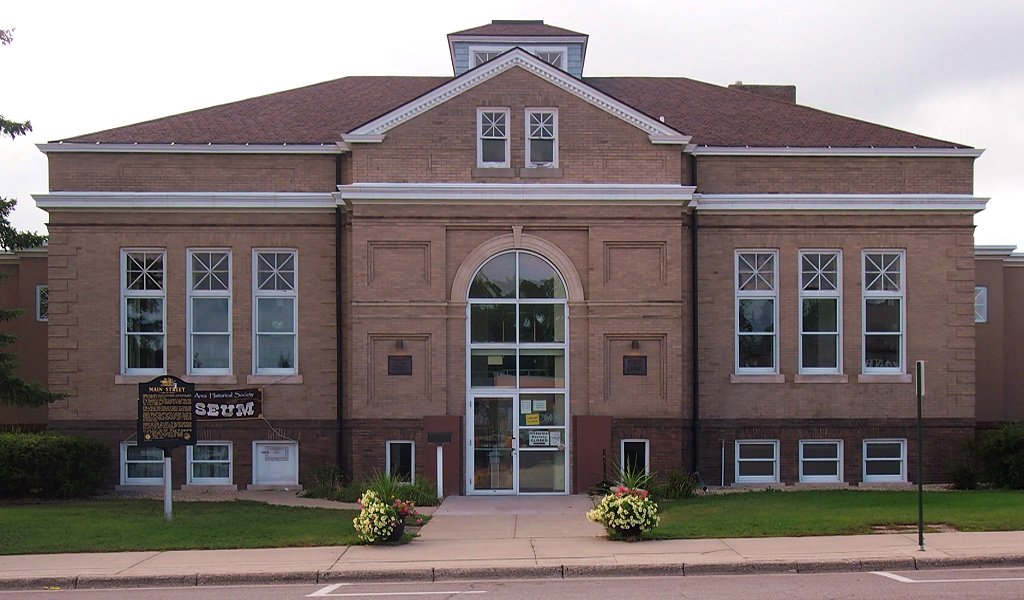
Originally a Carnegie Library, now the Sauk Centre Area History Museum and Research Center.

There are two schools in the town: Holy Family and Sauk Centre Public School. Holy Family is a Catholic private school; it enrolls students from kindergarten to 6th grade. Sauk Centre Public School has two departments: elementary (kindergarten to 4th grade) and secondary school (5th to 12th grade). The mascot of Sauk Centre Public Schools is the Mainstreeters, in honor of Sinclair Lewis' novel.

== Other ==
A violent local incident in 1996, where the elderly Paul Crawford shot and killed four members of the neighboring Schloegl family over a property dispute, was featured in the episode "Lake of Madness" on the Investigation Discovery series Fear Thy Neighbor. The episode aired on April 20, 2015.
