= Vi June =

Colorado politician (1932–2020)

Viola "Vi" June (July 20, 1932 - August 15, 2020) was a city councilor, mayor, state representative, and newspaper columnist in Colorado. She won a seat on the Westminster, Colorado city council in 1965. In 1975, she was elected mayor and became the first woman to hold the office, and served until 1981. She later ran for Colorado House, and served eight years from 1991 to 1998. She was a Democrat and served as the minority whip in 1994.

Viola Helen Beste was born in Sauk Centre, Minnesota. She studied at St. Cloud State University for one year before moving to Denver for a job at Gates Rubber. She began a career in journalism in 1963, and continued writing a column for the local papers until 2016. She was married for 60 years and had six children. She died on August 15, 2020 (aged 88).
