= John Warner Smith =

American poet and educator (born 1952)

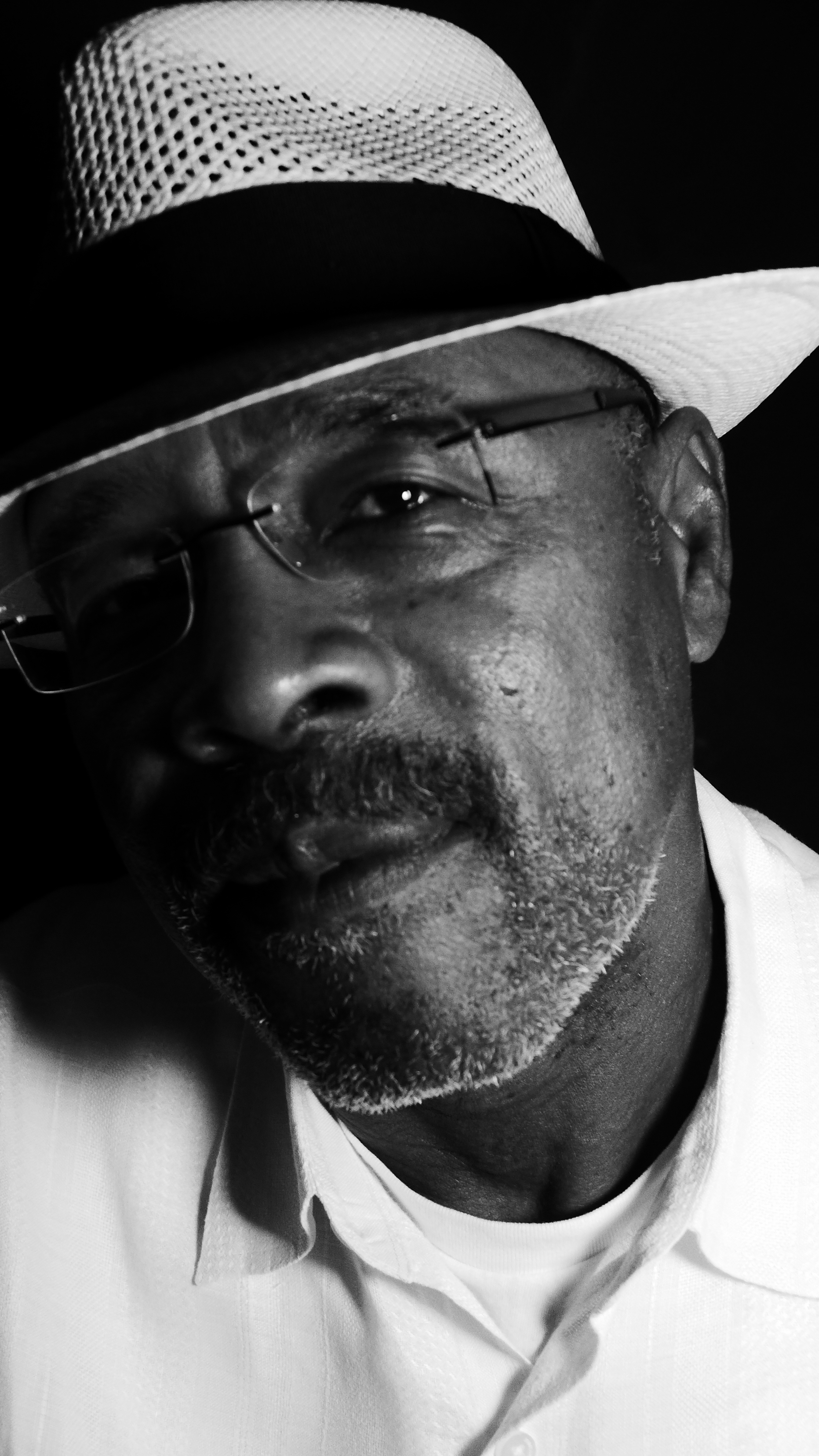
- Born: December 22, 1952 (age 73); Morgan City, Louisiana, U.S.
- Occupations: Poet, educator
- Known for: Louisiana Poet Laureate

John Warner Smith (born December 22, 1952) is an American poet and educator. He formerly held the position as the Louisiana Poet Laureate. His poems have appeared in numerous published works.

== Life, education, and career ==
Smith is a native of Morgan City, Louisiana. He grew up in Lake Charles, Louisiana, and received his M.F.A. in creative writing from the University of New Orleans. He holds a Master of Business Administration from the University of Louisiana at Lafayette, a B.S. in accounting and a B.S. in psychology from McNeese State University.

Smith teaches English at Southern University in Baton Rouge, where he resides. He studied with instructors and poets Terrance Hayes and Tracy K. Smith. He is also the chief executive officer of Education's Next Horizon, a statewide nonprofit organization dedicated to PreK-12 education reform in Louisiana. Prior to joining Education's Next Horizon, Smith worked as a banker for Chase. He also served as Secretary of Labor in the administration of Louisiana Governor Kathleen Blanco and as Chief Administrative Officer for Lafayette City-Parish consolidated government.

== Literary works ==
Smith's poems have appeared in literary journals across the country, including Ploughshares, Antioch Review, Callaloo, Transition, River Styx, and Quiddity. Smith's poems have been nominated for the Pushcart Prize and the Sundress Best of the Net Anthology. His poem Parted has been featured in the magazine Fjords Review.

About A Mandala of Hands, Terrance Hayes, a winner of the National Book Award for Poetry, has written: "John Warner Smith’s terrific debut collection pays homage to histories near and far, familial and mythic. Neighbors become ancestors, ancestors become neighbors offering the “songs we never heard,” the songs we have yet to sing in these rich poems. Smith writes with an anthropologist's precision and a griot's reverence as he revives, recovers and reimagines the voices that unite us. A Mandala of Hands is a mature and magical new book."

About Soul Be A Witness, Thomas Sayers Ellis, winner of the 2005 Whiting Award, wrote: "This is how you upright Richard Wright. Redressed as courageous and urgent contemporary command, Soul Be A Witness carefully balances and re-injects the nutrient-like echoes of the Black Literary Tradition into our current state of soft, staged, formal phony literary legacy––as Heroic savior text and Neo Blue Print for New Black Fighting. For every stone history has cast at us, Soul Be A Witness casts three back in pure “Don’t Get It Twisted” fashion."

== Poet Laureate of Louisiana ==
Smith was appointed by the Louisiana Endowment for the Humanities and governor John Bel Edwards to serve as the State's Poet Laureate. He held that position from 2019 to 2020. The poet laureate is the literary ambassador for the state and makes appearances to encourage the state's residents to explore and engage with poetry. In November 2019, Smith memorialized a violent racial incident in the state's history by appearing at a historical symposium and debuting a new poem about the events.

Smith is the first African-American male to serve in the position.

== Published collections ==
- A Mandala of Hands, Aldrich Press / Kelsay Books, 2015 ISBN 9780692415313
- Soul Be A Witness, MadHat Press, 2016, ISBN 9781941196267
- Spirits of the Gods, ULL Press, 2017, ISBN 9781946160010
- Muhammad’s Mountain, Lavender Ink, 2019, ISBN 1-944-88443-2
- Our Shut Eyes, MadHat Press, 2021, ISBN 1952335116
