= Ody J. Fish =

Ody J. Fish (June 16, 1925 – February 6, 2007) was Chairman of the Republican Party of Wisconsin.

== Biography ==
Fish was born Odilon Fish in Sauk Centre, Minnesota in 1925. He married Mary Ellen Koebke and had two children. In 2007, he died of esophageal cancer at his home in Pewaukee, Wisconsin.

== Career ==
Fish was Chairman of the Republican Party of Wisconsin from 1965 to 1970. Previously, he had chaired and vice chaired the Waukesha County, Wisconsin Republican Party and managed the 1964 gubernatorial campaign of Warren P. Knowles. From 1971 to 1984, Fish was a Republican National Committeeman. He also managed the 1976 Republican National Convention.
