= Joseph Zehrer =

German visual artist

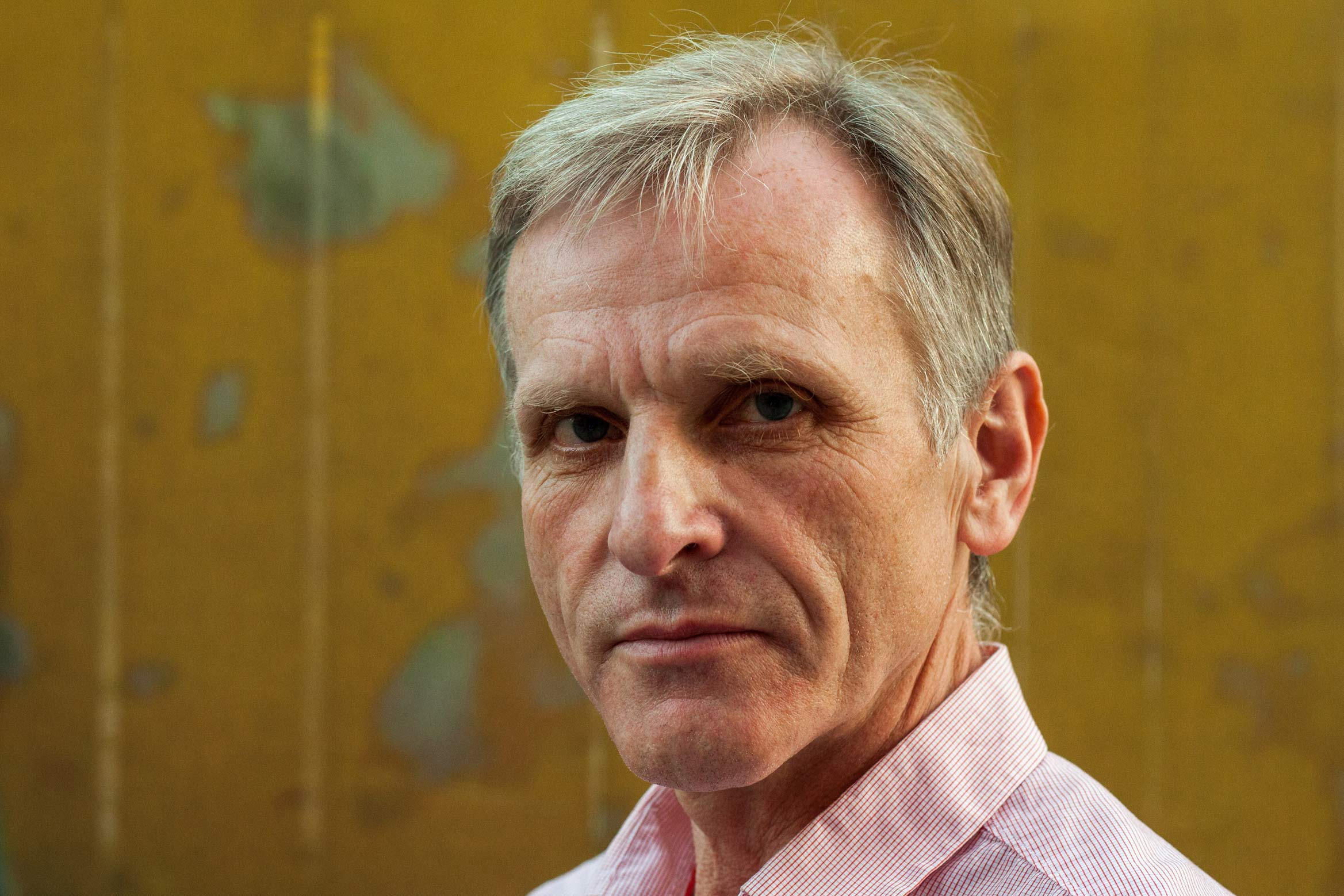
Joseph Zehrer, 2012

Joseph Zehrer (born May 16, 1954, in Perbing, West Germany) is a German visual artist. His works, exhibited in Europe and America, cover the spectrum from acrylic glass paintings to electric installations involving light and sound.

== Life ==
Joseph Zehrer studied arts from 1982 to 1988 at the Academy of Fine Arts, Munich. His teachers there were, among others, Eduardo Paolozzi (sculpting) and Hans Baschang (drawing and painting). From 1992 until 1994, together with the music journalist Karl Bruckmaier, Zehrer initiated a series of single topic film events (such as "Beatnik") in Munich. In 1993 he received the award for visual arts by the city of Munich (category "New Media"). His works are sculptures, installations, paintings and drawings, und light installations, bearing titles such as "Kunst sieht fern" (Art is watching TV), "Vorhänge - Eingeklemmtes - Melancholiker - Pistolen" (Curtains - Pinched Things - Melancholic - Pistols) and „per plexi“.

The director of the State Gallery Baden-Baden, Karola Grässlin, called Zehrer "not explicitly a painter, since you also create sculptures, drawings, room installations. But if you are a painter, then one who works conceptually and minimalistically. Is your aim to pose a radical challenge to the traditional understanding of painting and sculpture?" Zehrer answered: "It’s possible that I invent these techniques in order not to have to paint on canvas. Even though these Plexiglas pictures are all glued on canvas so they can be hung on a wall."

Joseph Zehrer lives in Cologne, Germany.

== Exhibitions (excerpt) ==
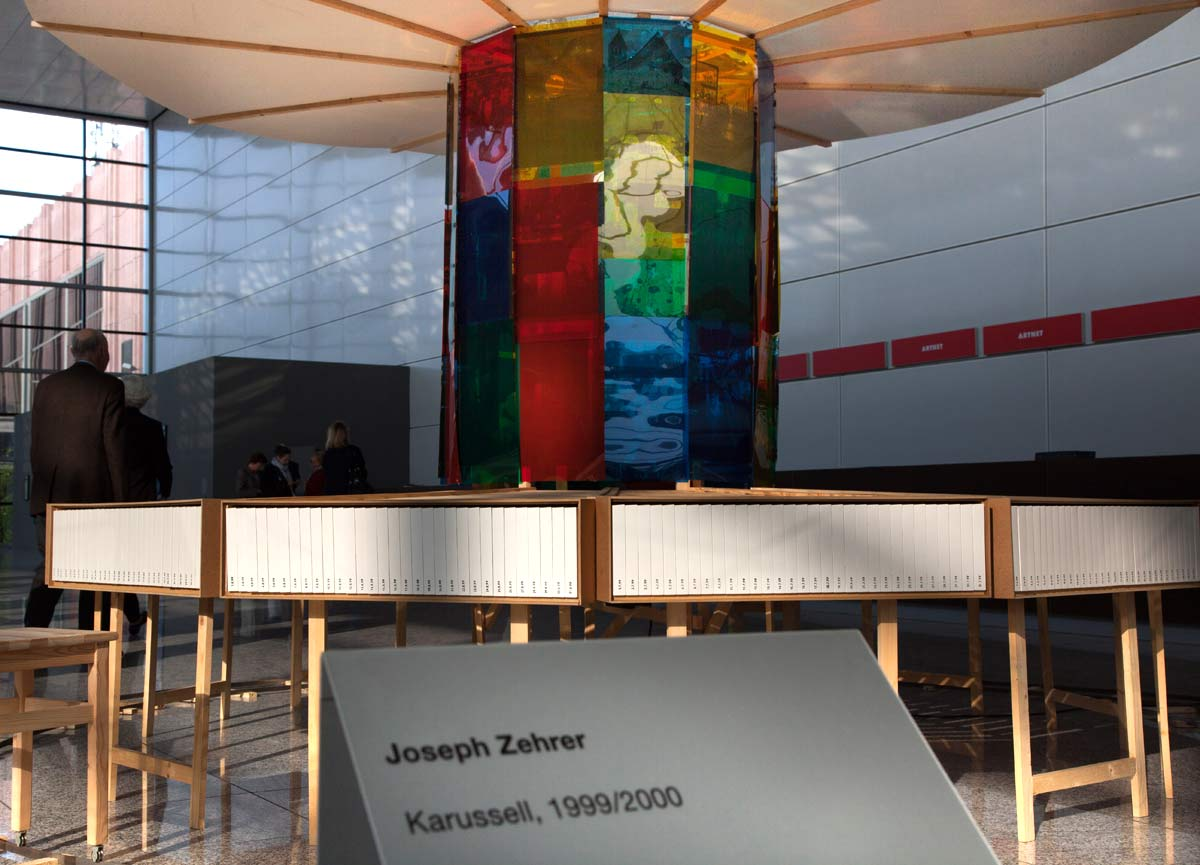
Installation Karussell, Art Cologne 2010

- 2012: Strom (“Current”), Gallery Christian Nagel, Cologne
- 2011: Light installation in the Mumok-Museum, Vienna
- 2008: Ernst (“Serious”), Stux Gallery, New York
- 2006: Worp, Kunstverein Heilbronn
- 2005: Lichtkunst aus Kunstlicht (Light Art from Art Light), ZKM Karlsruhe
- 2004: Skulpturenprojekt, Braunschweig

== Literature ==
- Matthia Löbke: Worp, Kunstverein Heilbronn, 2006
- Karl Bruckmaier, Catalogue: J. Zehrer, K-Raum Daxer, Munich, 1992
