= Odie (given name) =

Odie is a masculine given name and nickname which may refer to:

- Odie Armstrong (born 1981), American football player
- Odie Blackmon (active 21st c.), Grammy-nominated songwriter, see Category:Songs written by Odie Blackmon
- Odie Cleghorn (1891–1956), Canadian ice hockey player, coach, linesman and referee
- Odie Davis (born 1955), American baseball player
- Odie Harris (born 1966), American former National Football League player
- Odie Leigh, American musician
- Odie Payne (1926–1989), American Chicago blues drummer
- Odie Porter (1877–1903), American Major League Baseball pitcher
- Odie Spears (1924–1985), American National Basketball Association player

Odie is also a rarer feminine given name and nickname, short for Odell (given name), Odele, or Odette (given name).

Odie is also a pet name which may refer to Garfield fictional dog Odie or real dog Zeltim Odie Peterson.
