= Paul Zehrer =

American film director

Paul Conrad Zehrer (born October 10, 1963, in Sauk Centre, Minnesota) is an American film and television director, writer, producer, and editor. He was raised on a dairy farm and worked as a beekeeper before studying Philosophy at Vassar College. He later moved to New York City, where he began his filmmaking career.

Zehrer's directorial debut, Blessing, which captures the rhythms and rituals of Midwestern farm life, received an Independent Spirit Award nomination for Best First Screenplay.

He also directed the Emmy-nominated Blue's Clues (Nickelodeon), was an editor for Frontline (PBS), and has edited a number of feature documentaries, including "Listen Up: The Lives of Quincy Jones" and PBS' "Picasso Paints Picasso".

== Awards and nominations ==
- Independent Spirit Award, Best First Screenplay - Blessing (nomination)
- Emmy Award, Best Director - Blue's Clues (nomination)
- Sundance Grand Jury Prize - Blessing (nomination)
- Heart of America Award, Best Feature - Blessing
- Gold Jury Award, Houston International Film Festival - Blessing
- Critic's Award, Deauville Film Festival - Blessing (nomination)
