= West Lebanon, New Hampshire =

Unincorporated community in New Hampshire, United States

- Unincorporated community
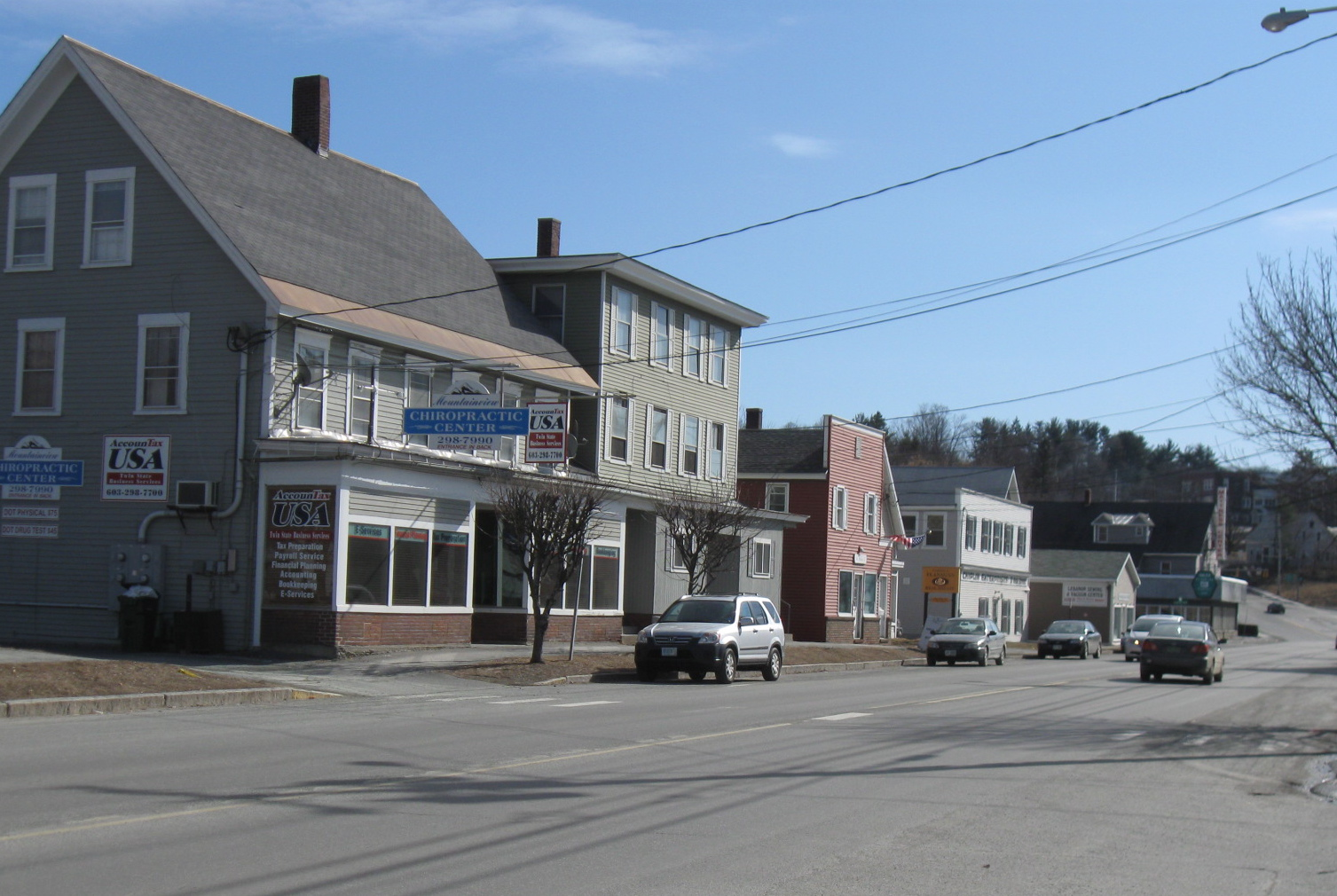
- Main Street, West Lebanon, in 2012

- Location within New Hampshire Location within the United States
- Coordinates: 43°38′57″N 72°18′37″W
- Country: United States
- State: New Hampshire
- County: Grafton
- City: Lebanon
- Elevation: 397 ft (121 m)
- Time zone: UTC-5 (Eastern (EST))
  - Summer (DST): UTC-4 (EDT)
- ZIP code: 03784
- Area code: 603
- GNIS feature ID: 870780

West Lebanon is an area within the city of Lebanon in Grafton County, New Hampshire, United States, along the Connecticut River. The ZIP Code area for the community had a population of 4,444 at the 2020 census, out of 14,282 in the entire city. West Lebanon contains a major commercial strip along New Hampshire Route 12A, serving the Upper Valley communities along Interstates 89 and 91. It also hosts the Lebanon Municipal Airport, a number of small software and tech businesses, and a regional daily newspaper, the Valley News. The village serves as a bedroom community for nearby Dartmouth College.

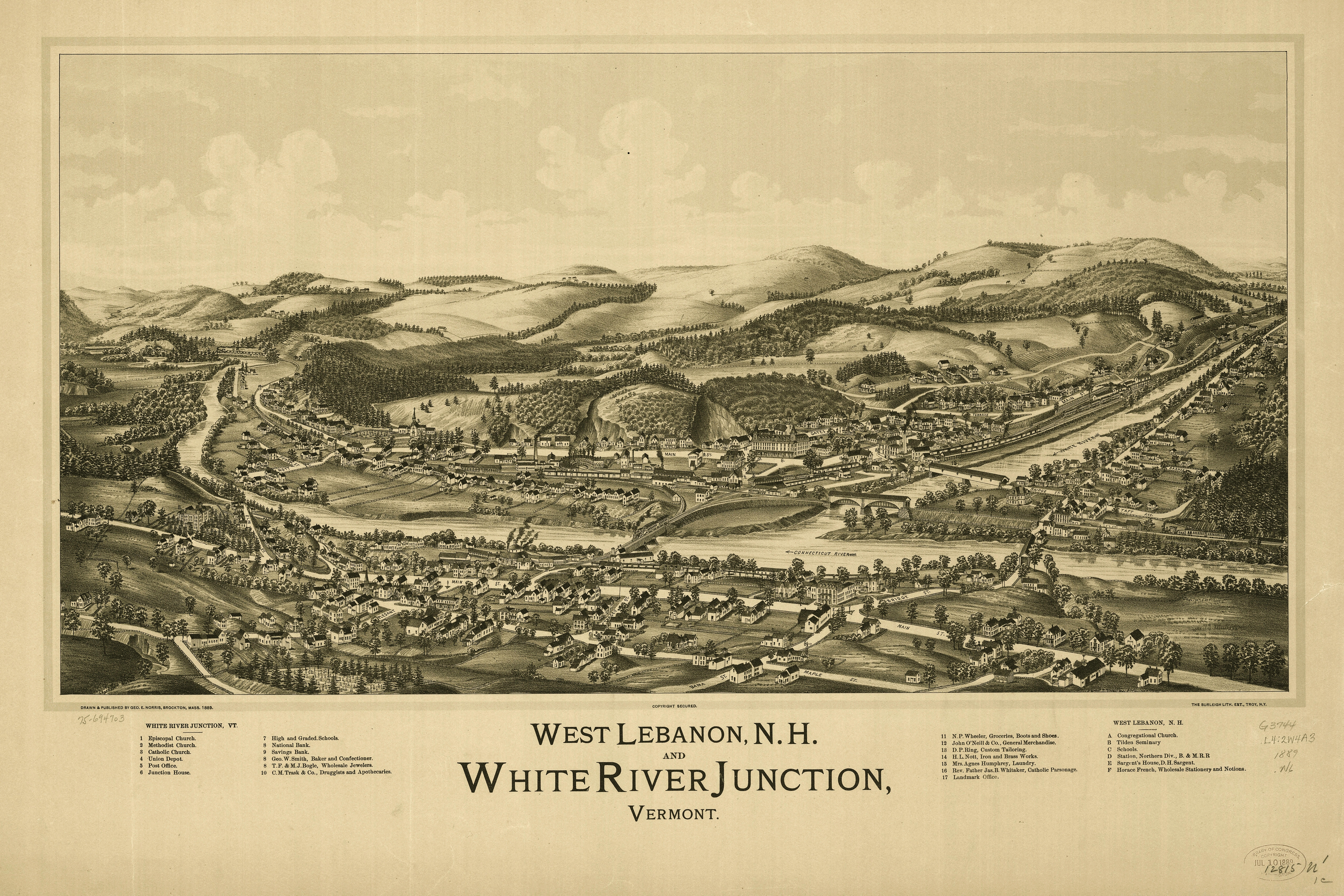
West Lebanon in 1889

West Lebanon was the site of Lebanon's first settlement in 1761. The village later developed into a regional hub for rail transport, although at that time it was better known to travelers as Westboro. By the 1950s, however, the rail industry had shrunk significantly. The rail service through West Lebanon was eventually terminated, and the village of White River Junction, Vermont, across the Connecticut River, took over most of the remaining services.

Today commerce has replaced transportation as the basis of the economy, and West Lebanon serves as the commercial hub for a U.S. micropolitan area (the Lebanon–Claremont micropolitan area) of over 220,000 people.
