= National Register of Historic Places listings in Morrison County, Minnesota =

Location of Morrison County in Minnesota

This is a list of the National Register of Historic Places listings in Morrison County, Minnesota. It is intended to be a complete list of the properties and districts on the National Register of Historic Places in Morrison County, Minnesota, United States. The locations of National Register properties and districts for which the latitude and longitude coordinates are included below, may be seen in an online map.

There are 25 properties and districts listed on the National Register in the county, including one National Historic Landmark. A supplementary list includes two additional sites that were formerly on the National Register.

This National Park Service list is complete through NPS recent listings posted March 27, 2026.

== Current listings ==
	Name on the Register	Image	Date listed	Location	City or town	Description
1	Ayer Mission Site	Ayer Mission Site	June 18, 1973 (#73000984)	Address restricted	Belle Prairie Township	Homestead site occupied 1849–1865 by frontier missionary Frederick Ayer (1803–1867), where he established a parochial school for Ojibwe, mixed-blood, and white children.
2	Belle Prairie Village Site	Belle Prairie Village Site	August 14, 1973 (#73000985)	Address restricted	Belle Prairie Township	Precontact Native American habitation site at a strategic riverbend, indicative of long use and good integrity.
3	Bridge No. 4969	Bridge No. 4969	January 21, 2015 (#14001175)	MN 115 & BNSF Railway over Mississippi River; 46°04′28″N 94°20′06″W	Camp Ripley vicinity	Minnesota's only unified road–rail bridge, built in 1930 as the key transportation connection for Camp Ripley, the state's first and most significant Minnesota National Guard reservation. Better known as the Camp Ripley Bridge.
4	Burton-Rosenmeier House	Burton-Rosenmeier House	March 13, 1986 (#86000328)	606 1st St. SE; 45°58′15″N 94°21′53″W	Little Falls	Little Falls' leading example of Neoclassical architecture, built c. 1900 and owned successively by notable local merchant Barney Burton and attorney/politician Christian Rosenmeier. Now houses the Little Falls Convention and Visitors Bureau.
5	Church of Our Savior-Episcopal	Church of Our Savior-Episcopal	July 17, 1980 (#80002090)	113 4th St. NE; 45°58′36″N 94°21′29″W	Little Falls	1903 Tudor Revival church significant as a leading example of Minnesota's second generation of Episcopal churches.
6	Crow Wing State Park	Crow Wing State Park	July 28, 1970 (#70000288)	Off Minnesota Highway 371; 46°16′39″N 94°20′40″W	Brainerd vicinity	Long-used site at a key travel junction associated with the Dakota/Ojibwe territorial conflict and the early town of Old Crow Wing, whose abandonment in the 1880s uniquely preserves the succession of the Native American, fur trade, and logging eras. Extends into Cass and Crow Wing Counties.
7	Fort Duquesne (21-MO-20)	Fort Duquesne (21-MO-20)	November 15, 1984 (#84000452)	Address restricted 46°00′46″N 94°21′30″W	Little Falls vicinity	Remains of a temporary winter fort established in 1752 by French trader Joseph Marin de la Malgue; a key source of information on early European colonialism and exploration in the northwest.
8	Fort Ripley	Fort Ripley	September 10, 1971 (#71000439)	Off Minnesota Highway 115; 46°10′32″N 94°22′23″W	Camp Ripley Military Reservation	Site of Minnesota's second military post, occupied 1849–1877 to keep the peace among the Dakota, Ojibwe, and Ho-Chunk and enable white settlement.
9	Charles A. Lindbergh House and Park	Charles A. Lindbergh House and Park	November 20, 1970 (#70000303)	1620 Lindbergh Dr. S. 45°57′29″N 94°23′16″W	Little Falls vicinity	1907 house and farm of Congressman Charles August Lindbergh and his son, aviator Charles Lindbergh. Now a state park and Minnesota Historical Society site.
10	Charles A. Lindbergh State Park WPA/Rustic Style Historic Resources	Charles A. Lindbergh State Park WPA/Rustic Style Historic Resources	October 25, 1989 (#89001655)	Off County Highway 52, south of Little Falls; 45°57′27″N 94°23′25″W	Little Falls vicinity	Park facilities significant as examples of New Deal federal work relief, state park development, and National Park Service rustic design, with six contributing properties built 1938–39.
11	Little Falls Carnegie Library	Little Falls Carnegie Library	November 3, 1980 (#80002091)	108 3rd St. NE; 45°58′36″N 94°21′31″W	Little Falls	1905 Carnegie library noted for its high state of preservation and atypical American Craftsman architecture.
12	Little Falls Commercial Historic District	Little Falls Commercial Historic District	July 22, 1994 (#94000740)	Roughly 1st St. SE from 1st Ave SE to 1st Ave. NE; 45°58′35″N 94°21′45″W	Little Falls	Downtown commercial district reflecting Little Falls' abrupt evolution from an agricultural trade center to a lumber and industrial powerhouse, with 32 contributing properties built 1887–1936.
13	Morrison County Courthouse	Morrison County Courthouse	December 5, 1978 (#78001552)	107 2nd St. SE; 45°58′32″N 94°21′38″W	Little Falls	County courthouse built 1890–91, noted for its impressive Richardsonian Romanesque architecture of local brick and granite.
14	Northern Pacific Railway Depot	Northern Pacific Railway Depot	September 5, 1985 (#85001987)	200 1st St. NW; 45°58′42″N 94°22′11″W	Little Falls	Shingle Style railway station built 1899–1900, one of architect Cass Gilbert's last projects while in Minnesota and a symbol of the highly influential Northern Pacific Railway.
15	Our Lady of the Angels Academy	Our Lady of the Angels Academy	December 28, 2005 (#05001474)	18801 Riverwood Dr. 46°02′05″N 94°20′18″W	Belle Prairie Township	1911 parochial elementary school building enlarged in 1931, a local example of the nationally influential Catholic school system and anchor of the Belle Prairie community.
16	Pelkey Lake Site	Pelkey Lake Site	October 2, 1973 (#73000986)	Address restricted	Belle Prairie Township	Lakeside mound site that has yielded artifacts spanning from Paleo-Indians through the Archaic and Woodland periods to early-contact-era Ojibwe.
17	Zebulon Pike's 1805-1806 Wintering Quarters	Zebulon Pike's 1805-1806 Wintering Quarters	July 11, 1988 (#88000538)	Address restricted	Little Falls vicinity	Remains of a fort built by Zebulon Pike's first expedition, well preserved under a river impoundment; the only U.S. military post associated with the initial government exploration of northern Louisiana Territory.
18	Pine Tree Lumber Company Office Building	Pine Tree Lumber Company Office Building	September 5, 1985 (#85001991)	735 1st St. NE; 45°59′04″N 94°21′39″W	Little Falls	1891 office building, the only intact surviving structure of Frederick Weyerhaeuser's Minnesota lumber company (active 1890–1919), one of the state's largest and the major employer in Little Falls.
19	Rice Lake Prehistoric District	Rice Lake Prehistoric District	October 2, 1973 (#73000987)	Address restricted	Little Falls vicinity	1000 BCE–1700 CE habitation and mound site.
20	St. Joseph's Church-Catholic	St. Joseph's Church-Catholic	September 5, 1985 (#85001998)	68 Main St. 45°58′48″N 94°06′12″W	Pierz	Gothic Revival church built 1886–88 for a German Catholic community attracted by Father Francis Xavier Pierz in the late 1860s.
21	Stanchfield Logging Camp	Stanchfield Logging Camp	February 12, 1999 (#99000190)	Address restricted	Camp Ripley Military Reservation	Site of an early commercial logging camp, active over the winter of 1847–48.
22	Swan River Village Site	Swan River Village Site	October 2, 1973 (#73000988)	Address restricted	Little Falls vicinity	Site of an Ojibwe village on the Mississippi River, recorded by Joseph Nicollet in 1836.
23	William Warren Two Rivers House Site and Peter McDougall Farmstead	William Warren Two Rivers House Site and Peter McDougall Farmstead	December 7, 1974 (#74001031)	5815 Hilton Rd. 45°50′37″N 94°20′46″W	Royalton vicinity	Site of the 1847 house and trading post of William Whipple Warren (1825–1853) where he composed a seminal history of the Ojibwe, plus a homestead-era farm with an 1874 barn, encapsulating two periods of Minnesota frontier history.
24	Charles A. Weyerhaeuser and Musser Houses	Charles A. Weyerhaeuser and Musser Houses	September 5, 1985 (#85001990)	608 Highland Ave. 45°58′15″N 94°21′59″W	Little Falls	Adjoining 1898 houses of second-generation lumber magnates, symbolizing the Minnesota lumber industry and its domination by a few powerful individuals. Now Linden Hill Historic Estate.
25	Almond A. White House	Almond A. White House	March 13, 1986 (#86000330)	Cleveland and Beaulieu Sts. 46°20′10″N 94°38′28″W	Motley	1902 house with a four-story tower, noted for its prominent and locally unusual Queen Anne architecture.

== Former listings ==
	Name on the Register	Image	Date listed	Date removed	Location	City or town	Description
1	O. A. Churchill Store		September 5, 1985 (#85001988)	May 7, 1990	55 Bay St.	Little Falls	Long the oldest commercial building in Central Minnesota, built in 1855. Demolished in 1988.
2	Clough Township Hall		September 8, 1985 (#85001985)	September 29, 2004	CR 206	Randall vicinity	1922 Classical Revival meeting hall sided with sheet metal embossed to look like stone. Moved in 2001.

== See also ==
- List of National Historic Landmarks in Minnesota
- National Register of Historic Places listings in Minnesota
