= Gordon Rosenmeier =

American lawyer and politician (1907–1989)

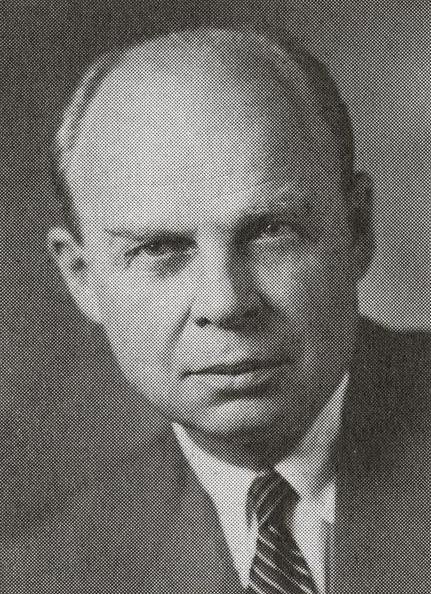

Member of the Minnesota Senate from the 53rd district
- In office January 7, 1941 – January 4, 1971
- Preceded by: Frederick Joseph Miller
- Succeeded by: Win Borden

Personal details
- Born: July 1, 1907 Royalton, Minnesota, US
- Died: January 17, 1989 (aged 81) St. Cloud, Minnesota, US
- Parent: Christian Rosenmeier (father)
- Education: University of Minnesota (B.S.); Stanford Law School
- Profession: Lawyer

Military service
- Allegiance: United States
- Branch/service: United States Navy
- Battles/wars: World War II (Asiatic-Pacific Theater)

Gordon Arthur Christian Rosenmeier (July 1, 1907 – January 17, 1989) was an American lawyer and politician who served in the Minnesota Senate from 1941 until 1971. He represented the 53rd district, which at the time consisted of Morrison and Crow Wing counties.

Rosenmeier's legislation was responsible for the creation of the Minnesota State Planning Agency and the Minnesota Pollution Control Agency. He was also influential in the founding of the Metropolitan Council. At 10,995 service days in the Senate, he is tied for twelfth in terms of all-time service length by a Minnesota state senator.

During his tenure, he was considered a leading figure of the Conservative caucus (Note: At the time, the Minnesota Legislature was nonpartisan, though members often were a part of either the Liberal or Conservative Caucus. See Minnesota Legislature § The non-partisan era) in the legislature, with some members saying he was the most able and influential senator in the body's history.

Outside of the Senate, Rosenmeier was a prominent lawyer who led his firm from 1932 until his death in 1989.

== Early life ==
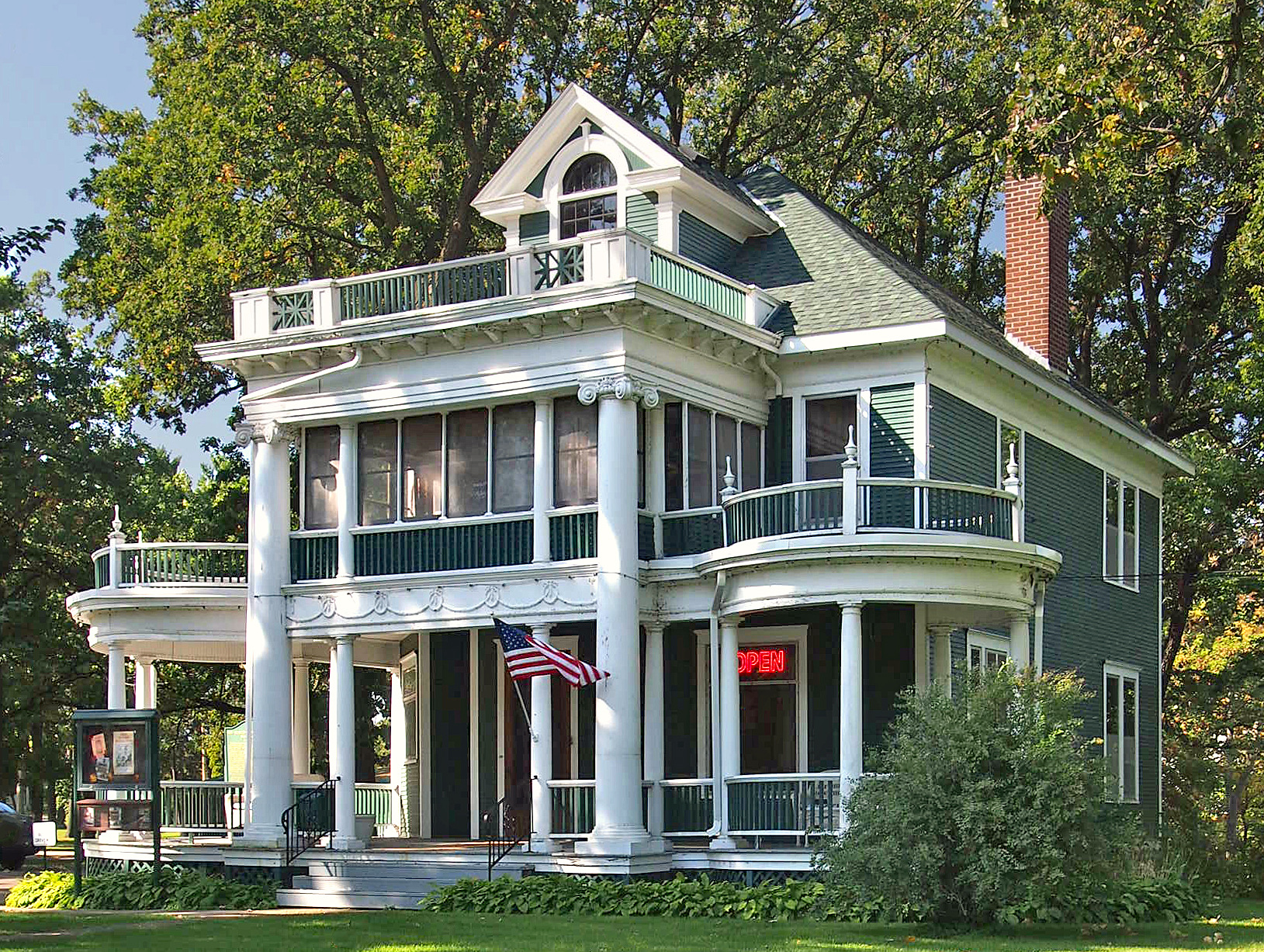
The Burton-Rosenmeier House, where Rosenmeier grew up and lived for the majority of his life

Gordon Rosenmeier was born on July 1, 1907, in Royalton, Minnesota. At the time, his father, Christian, was working as a lawyer and his mother, Linda (née Bakken), was a primary school teacher. In 1909, his sister, Margaret, was born. The family moved to neighboring Little Falls upon Christian's 1914 appointment as the Morrison county attorney and a year later, Rosenmeier's brother, Donald, was born. Rosenmeier cited his father's practice as playing a major role in shaping his interest in law, saying that he had never thought of being anything other than a lawyer. Christian resigned his post in 1920 to become vice president of the American Savings Trust Company of Little Falls. The following year, the Rosenmeiers purchased the Burton-Rosenmeier House from prominent local businessman Barney Burton. Later that year, Christian was elected to the Minnesota State Senate.

Rosenmeier attended and graduated from Little Falls Community High School. He then attended the University of Minnesota and graduated with a Bachelor of Science degree in 1928. Afterwards, he earned a law degree from Stanford Law School, passing the California Bar exam. Following this, he began to practice law at the University of Chicago Law School but he returned home to work at his father's law practice. Not long after, Christian fell ill with heart, kidney, and blood conditions, later succumbing to them. Gordon would assume control over his father's practice following his death.

== Early law career and first Senate campaign ==
Rosenmeier joined his law practice before his father's death, and took control afterwards. He was also persuaded by family friends to run for his father's Senate seat for the 53rd district, representing Crow Wing and Morrison counties. One of his opponents filed a lawsuit against him during his campaign, falsely arguing that Rosenmeier was not a citizen of Minnesota because he recently took the California Bar exam. Rosenmeier was defeated by Franklin E. Ebner, a Brainerd attorney, in the special election. He had received 8,123 votes compared to Ebner's 8,566, a margin of nearly 2.65%.

Following his loss, Rosenmeier resumed his law practice. This period of time was marked by the Great Depression and businesses like his were struggling to survive. Rosenmeier later remarked:

"Oh, those were grim days... We got $1 for making a deed, $5 for defending a man in Justice Court and, at the outside, $25 for District Court. I would only charge $5 for an abstract. So you had to work like hell to get enough money to pay the rent.”

== Senate career ==
=== Early legislation ===
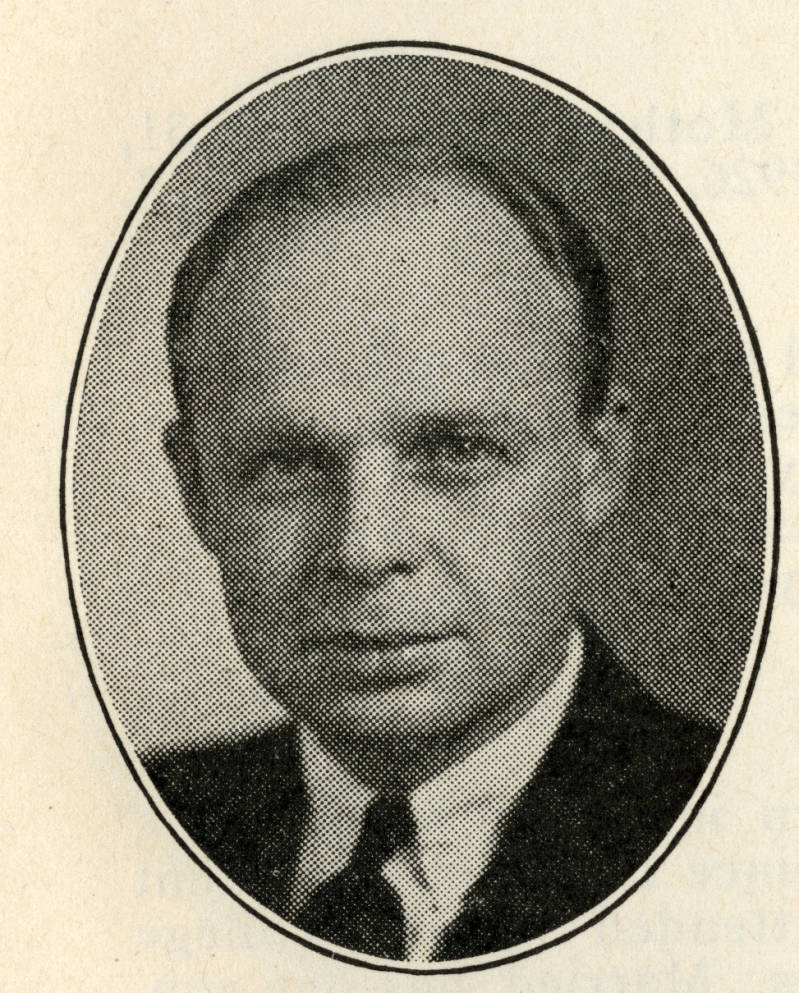
Official portrait of Rosenmeier for the 1941–42 legislative session

Rosenmeier ran in another special election in 1940, this time following the death of Frederick Joseph Miller. His opponent was Brainerd city council member Vic Quanstrom. Rosenmeier received 14,031 votes to Quanstrom's 7,231, winning by nearly a two-to-one margin.

Rosenmeier served in the United States Navy during World War II, and won the 1942 general election in absentia, running unopposed. He served in the Asiatic-Pacific Theater until at least 1944. Rosenmeier was named chairman of the military affairs committee upon the start of the 54th Senate session, though once again, his military service interfered with his role in the Senate and an acting chairman was called upon to fill his spot.

Rosenmeier cosponsored Luther Youngdahl's fair employment practices bill, which aimed to eliminate workplace discrimination based on race, religion, or national origin. Measures like these were frequently introduced in state legislatures throughout the union at the time. Youngdahl's proposal was especially noteworthy, however, as it would establish an interracial council for educational purposes to help eliminate workplace discrimination, with $5,000 being allotted for the annual payment of a councilmember. The bill was hotly debated in the Senate, but failed by a vote of 34–29. Six years later, the measure passed with Rosenmeier's support.

Rosenmeier also sponsored legislation that would establish a state mental hospital in Brainerd. Minnesota had seen a shortage of adequate mental hospital facilities, with a waiting list present for patients and crowded conditions in the ones that were available. The hospital opened in June 1958 and continued to expand, becoming one of the three state facilities for the mentally disabled and epileptic in 1967.

Camp Ripley, a Minnesota National Guard facility that Rosenmeier's father helped create, expanded northward, thanks to legislation sponsored by Rosenmeier. The last of these expansions occurred in 1961, with the base measuring at 53,000 acres.

=== Rise to power ===
Rosenmeier had become one of the leading figures in the Senate, in large part to his position as the chairman of the Senate judiciary committee. He was widely considered the leader of the Conservatives.

When the Mississippi River oil spill occurred in 1962 and 1963, Rosenmeier introduced legislation that gave the state's Water Pollution Control Commission power to enforce rules to prevent the contamination of groundwater. It gave the commission the ability to order the abatement of sewage and industrial wastes, and if a municipality refused to comply, the state would take over the municipality's sewage treatment function. It would design facilities, levy taxes and assessments, acquire land, and supervise the construction of adequate sewage treatment facilities. This legislation, called the Rosenmeier Act, became law on May 22, 1963. An amendment was later added to prohibit storing waste where it could enter state waters. The Rosenmeier Act sparked additional legislation for environmental protection in the state. It also led to the formation of the Minnesota Pollution Control Agency in 1967. Rosenmeier found that the commission was inefficient in enforcing the rules set forth in his legislation, and had decided to create the agency to better keep the laws enforced. With the creation of the agency, it became the first state agency to consider pollution an ethical concern.

The state planning agency was created in 1965, with Rosenmeier sponsoring legislation for its creation. The agency was responsible for allocating state resources and coordinated activities between governmental bodies. The agency existed in this form until 1991, becoming the Office of Strategic and Long Range Planning, which was abolished in 2003.

Rosenmeier was also a key figure in the establishment of the Metropolitan Council. When the idea was first proposed following a 1967 Citizens League report, Rosenmeier questioned the need for such a body. He later changed his stance, saying he supported the creation of the council, though he argued for a less powerful body than did some others. Bill Frenzel and Harmon Ogdahl proposed an elected council with a broad range of authority. Rosenmeier and Howard Albertson countered their proposal with a planning and coordinating body whose members were appointed by the governor and whose authority was limited to select regional services. The Rosenmeier-Albertson proposal prevailed in both houses.

In 1969, Rosenmeier was instrumental in securing funding to develop the Lindbergh House and Museum. The site would later be transferred to the Minnesota Historical Society. It is likely that soon after, the house received the state historic site designation.

=== Later legislation and defeat ===
In 1969—four years before the U.S. Supreme Court's upheld the constitutional right to have an abortion in Roe v. Wade—Rosenmeier, as chair of the judiciary committee, granted a hearing on Kelly Gage's bill to relax the state's ban on abortion. Rosenmeier voted for the bill in the committee, though he claimed that it was so it could reach the Senate floor so it could be debated further. The bill was later passed, permitting abortions performed for medical reasons.

In the 1970 general election, Rosenmeier had a serious opponent for only the second time in his career. The first saw Rosenmeier defeat future House representative Howard E. Smith by a relatively wide margin. Rosenmeier's opponent, 26-year-old Win Borden, had planned on running against him for years. He used Rosenmeier's vote on the abortion bill against him, and employed modern strategies like canvassing, the printing of brochures, and other forms of advertising. Rosenmeier was noted as not performing well in the debates and his campaign could not compete with Borden's. Borden later said of Rosenmeier:

"He was just not used to being challenged, he was a fine legislator—did many wonderful things. But the political thicket in the street wasn’t something he was used to.”

The resulting election saw Borden win by a 14-point margin, which was considered by many as an upset. Borden, an attorney from Brainerd, would win reelections in 1972 and 1976 before resigning to take a leadership position with a forerunner of the Minnesota Chamber of Commerce.

Upon his defeat, Rosenmeier ranked seventh in terms of all state Senators in terms of service length. As of January 2021, he was tied for twelfth all-time.

== Later life and death ==
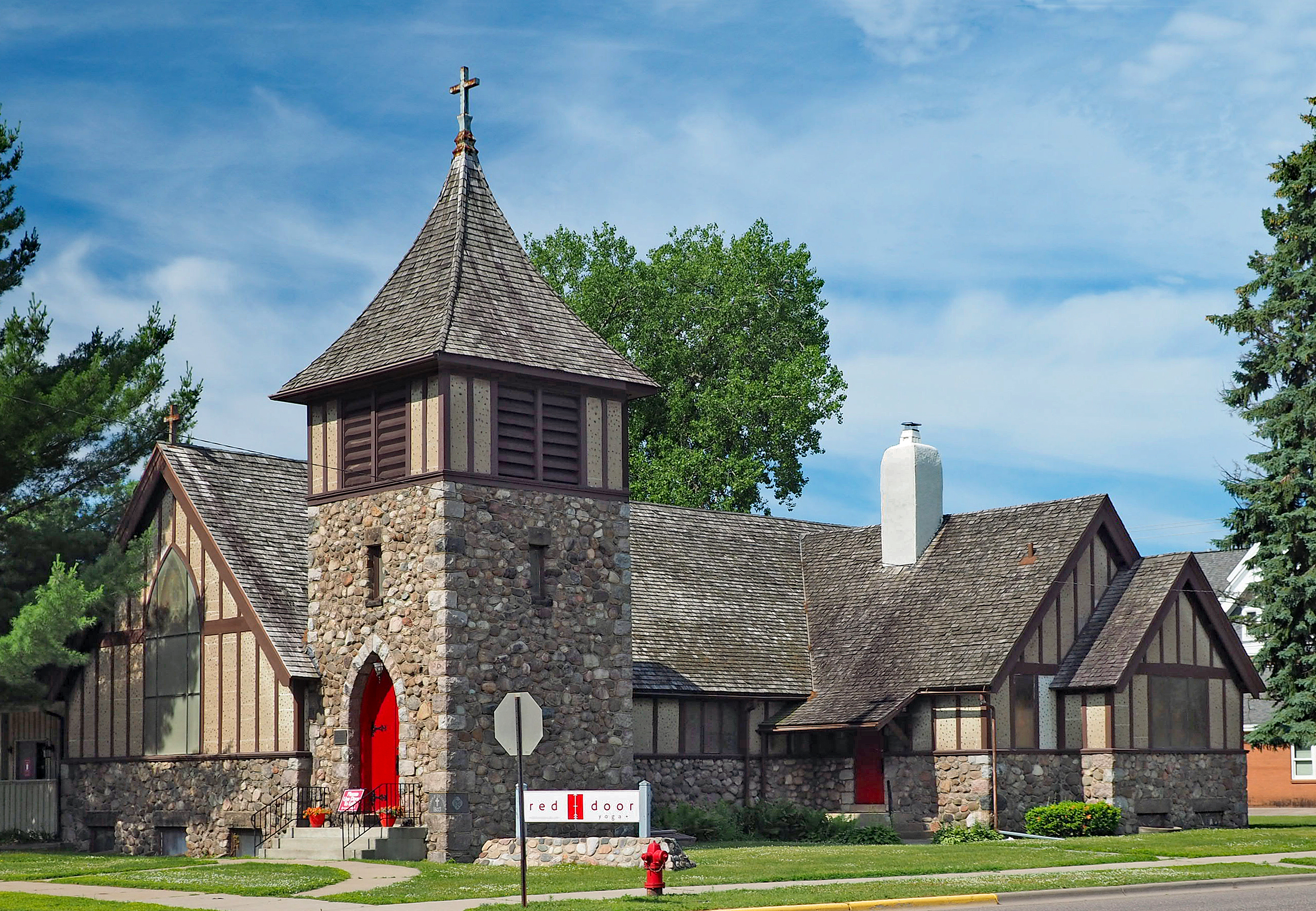
Church of Our Savior, where Rosenmeier's funeral was held

Rosenmeier continued to work at his law firm after his defeat. John E. Simonett, a future Minnesota Supreme Court justice, joined the firm after graduating from the University of Minnesota Law School in 1951. The two would remain partners until Simonett's appointment to the Supreme Court in 1980. Douglas Anderson, a district court judge in Minnesota, wrote that the pair were perhaps the most talented firm in all of Outstate Minnesota.

Rosenmeier was a public member of the Minnesota News Council when it was founded in 1971. Among other notable members were Malcolm Moos, Warren Spannaus, and James L. Hetland Jr. He was also a board member for the Minnesota Historical Society and the Minnesota Zoological Garden Foundation and was listed as a "friend" of The Hastings Center.

While he still lived there, on March 13, 1986, the Burton-Rosenmeier House was added to the National Register of Historic Places. Both he and his sister, Margaret, were listed as owners of the property.

Rosenmeier died on January 17, 1989, following a heart attack. He was in a St. Cloud hospital with pneumonia at the time. His funeral took place at the historic Church of Our Savior in Little Falls, while a public memorial service took place at the auditorium of the Little Falls Community High School.

== Legacy ==
References to Rosenmeier exist throughout Minnesota. In 1989, Central Lakes College established a building called the Rosenmeier Center for State and Local Government on campus, recognizing Rosenmeier's service as a legislator. The Charles A. Weyerhauser Memorial Museum in Little Falls has a research room named after Rosenmeier. The Minnesota Capitol building contains two portraits of Rosenmeier. He was one of only five non-Governors to have a portrait in the Capitol, and the only non-Governor to have more than one portrait.

For decades following his defeat, Rosenmeier was widely regarded within state legislative circles as the most able and influential state Senator in history. He earned the nickname "Little Giant from Little Falls," perhaps due to the large impact he had and because of his reputation of being an intimidating figure in the Senate. In addition, Governor Harold LeVander once said, in jest, that, "I happen to be one of eight governors who served under him."
