= Christian Rosenmeier =

Danish-American lawyer and Minnesota State Senator

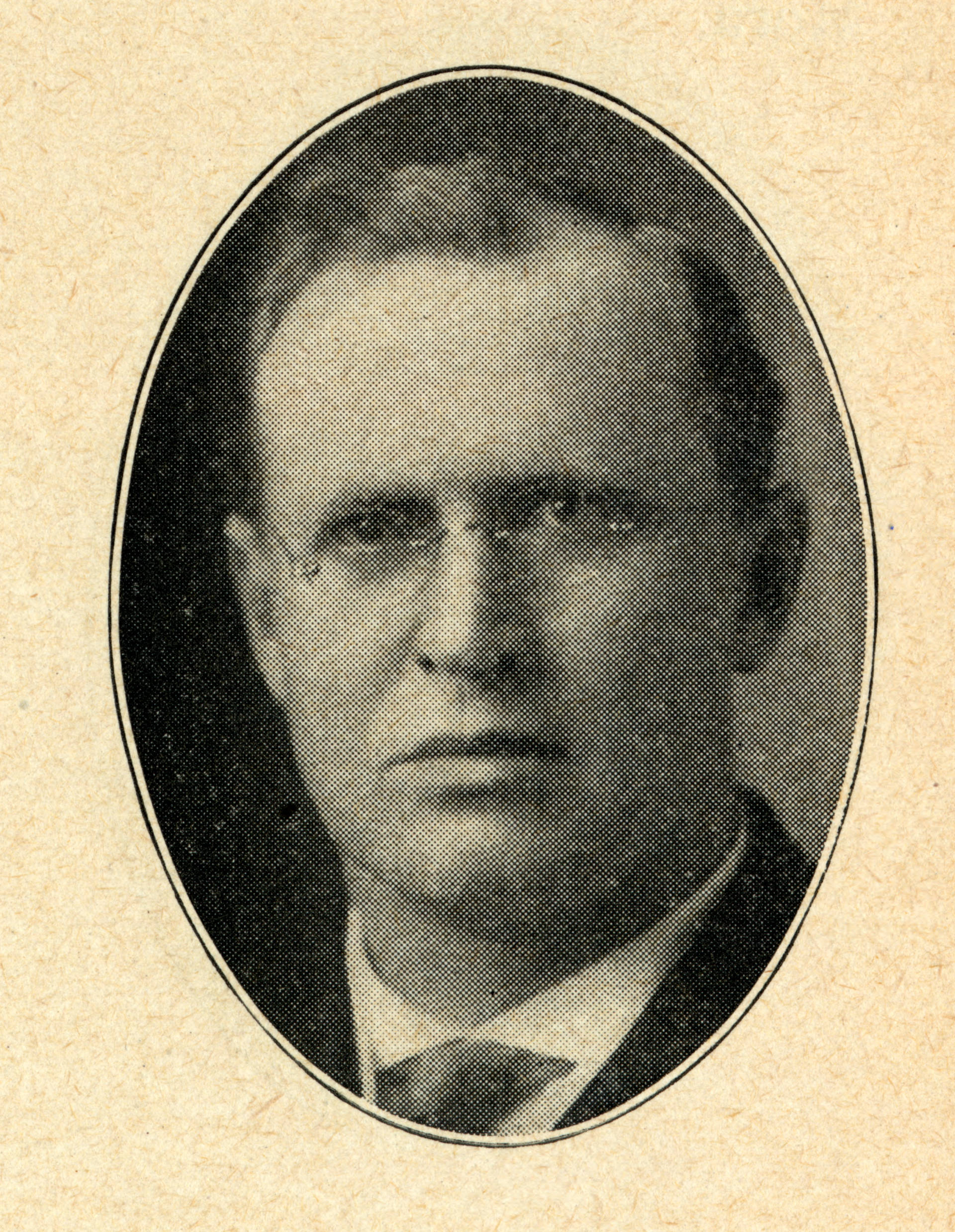
- Rosenmeier in 1923

Member of the Minnesota Senate from the 53rd district
- In office January 2, 1923 – June 3, 1932
- Preceded by: Hilding Alfred Swanson
- Succeeded by: Franklin E. Ebner

Personal details
- Born: 1874 Denmark
- Died: June 3, 1932 (aged 57–58)
- Party: Nonpartisan
- Spouse: Linda Bakken (m. 1906)
- Children: 3 (including Gordon)
- Education: Mankato Normal School; University of Minnesota Law School
- Occupation: Lawyer

Christian "C." Rosenmeier (1874–June 3, 1932) was a Danish-American lawyer and Minnesota State Senator from 1923 until his death in 1932. He was responsible for legislation that created Charles A. Lindbergh State Park and Camp Ripley.

== Early life and career ==
Rosenmeier was born in Denmark sometime in 1874. When he was 14, he emigrated to the United States with his father. They settled in Kandiyohi County, Minnesota. He worked on the family farm until he was 21, helping to earn enough money to bring his mother and sister over from Denmark. During the winter months, he attended Willmar Academy. He passed the county school teacher exam in 1895, and subsequently taught in various rural schools for several years. He graduated from Mankato Normal School in 1901 and became principal of the school in Dundee.

Rosenmeier made a decision to switch from a teaching career to a legal career and graduated from University of Minnesota Law School in 1906, as class president. Following his graduation, he moved to Royalton to practice law and founded the Rosenmeier Law Office in 1911. He relocated to Little Falls around 1914 following his election as Morrison County Attorney, a role he served for six years before he was elected to the Minnesota Senate for the 53rd district (encompassing Morrison and Crow Wing counties). The same year of his election, 1923, he was listed as president, trust officer, and director of the American Savings Trust Company of Little Falls. During his time as senator, he served as chairman of the Rules Committee and became majority leader of the Conservative caucus, a title he avoided using. He served in the Senate until his death.

== Personal life ==
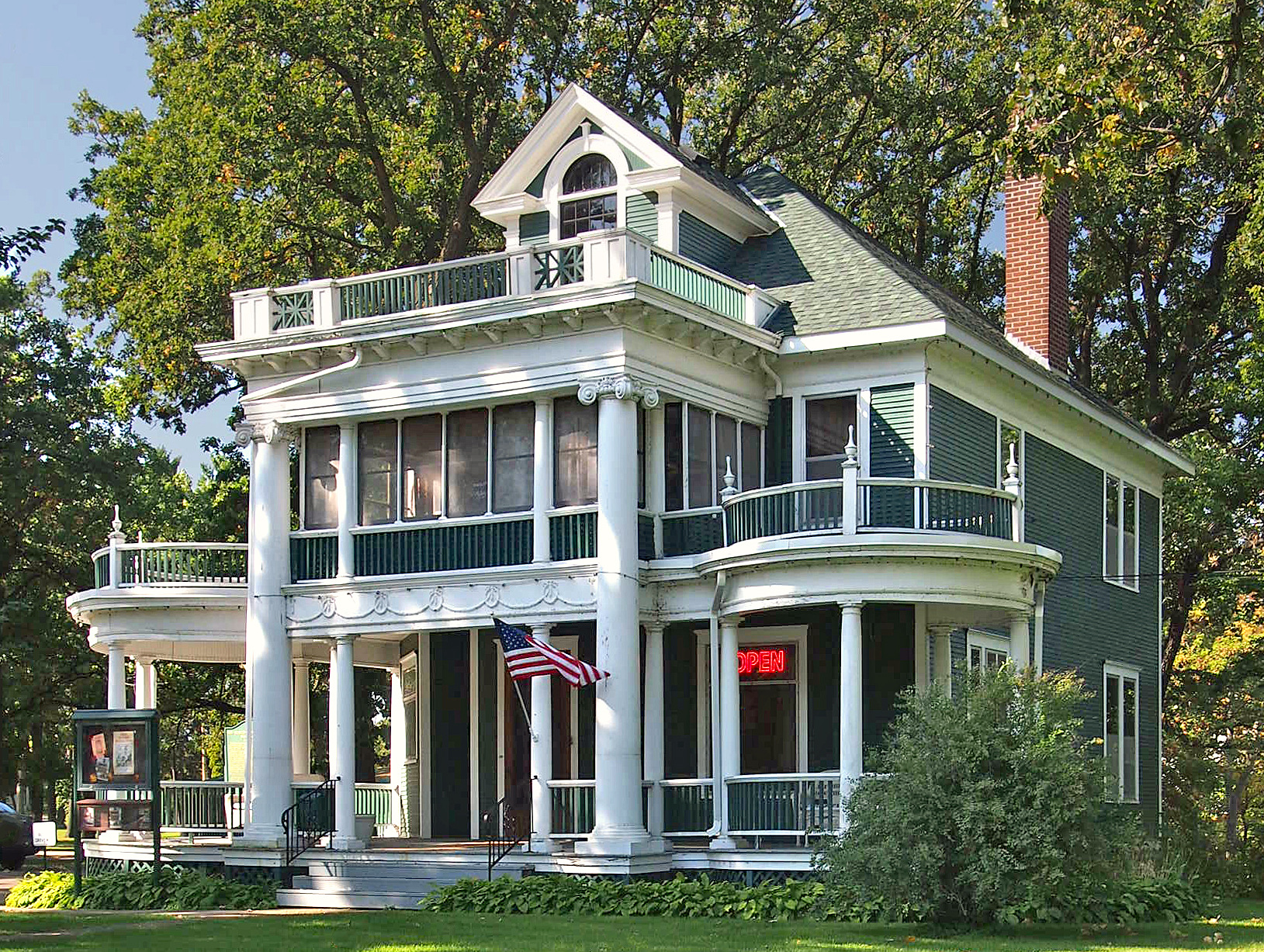
The Burton-Rosenmeier House

Rosenmeier married primary school teacher Linda Bakken in August 1906. They had three children: Gordon, Margaret, and Donald. Gordon would go on to be a lawyer and would serve in his father's Senate seat. The family lived in the historic Burton-Rosenmeier House in Little Falls after purchasing the house from lumberman Barney Burton in 1921. Rosenmeier was an Episcopalian and was also active in the Shriners and the Elks.

=== Death ===
Rosenmeier died on June 3, 1932, following months of heart, kidney, and blood illness. His wife and children were at his side when he passed. His funeral was held two days later at Church of Our Savior in Little Falls.
