= Rosenmeier (surname) =

Rosenmeier is a German surname. It is derived from the words rosen (rose) and meier (farmer, cutter, tender). It is also found in Denmark.

Notable people with the surname include:

- Christian Rosenmeier, Danish-American politician
- Erik Rosenmeier, American football player for the Buffalo Bills
- Gordon Rosenmeier, American politician and son of Christian
- Peter Rosenmeier, Danish table tennis player, Paralympic gold medalist
