= Fort Duquesne (disambiguation) =

Fort Duquesne was a fort established by the French in what in now Pittsburgh, Pennsylvania, in 1754 and destroyed in 1758.

Fort Duquesne may also refer to:

- Battle of Fort Duquesne (1758), an unsuccessful British assault on the fort in the French and Indian Wars
- Fort Duquesne Bridge, spanning the Allegheny River in Pittsburgh
- RFA Fort Duquesne (A229), an air stores ship of the British Royal Fleet Auxiliary
- USS Cowanesque (AO-79), a US Navy fleet oiler of World War II originally launched as the SS Fort Duquesne
- Fort Duquesne (Minnesota), a former French fur trade post listed on the National Register of Historic Places

== See also ==
- Fort Duchesne, Utah
