= Burton-Rosenmeier House =

Historic house in Minnesota, United States

- U.S. National Register of Historic Places
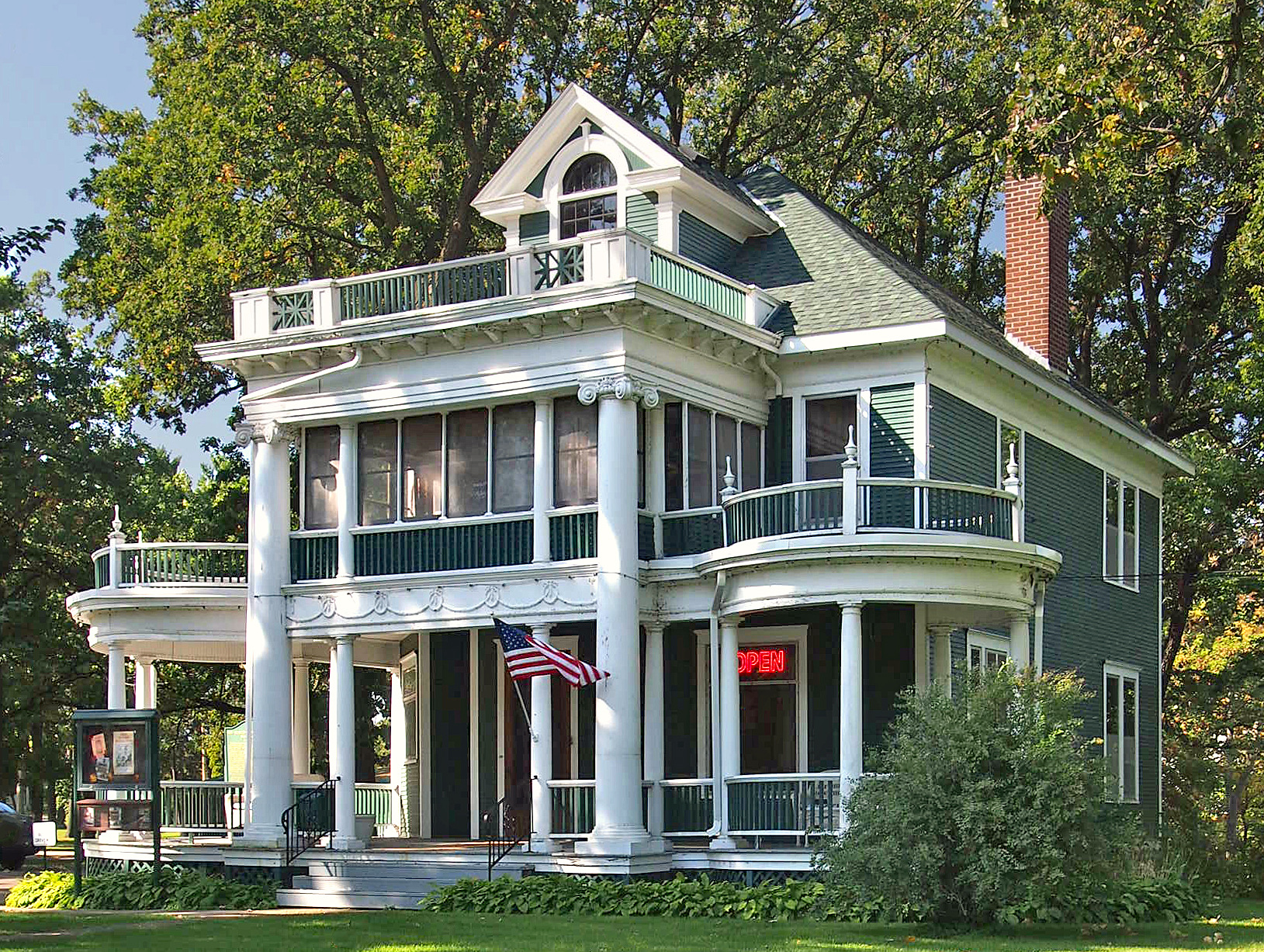
- Exterior of the house

- Location within Minnesota Location within the United States
- Interactive map of Burton-Rosenmeier House
- Location: 606 1st St. SE, Little Falls, Minnesota
- Coordinates: 45.970872°N 94.364747°W
- Area: less than one acre
- Built: 1903
- Architectural style: Neoclassical
- NRHP reference No.: 86000328
- Added to NRHP: March 13, 1986

The Burton-Rosenmeier House is a historic house in Little Falls, Minnesota. Built in 1903 by businessman Barney Burton, the house was added to the National Register of Historic Places on March 13, 1986, for both its architectural and historical significance.

The house is currently part of Maple Island Park.

== Description ==
The house is located along Little Falls' First Street Southeast, south of the Little Falls Commercial Historic District and northeast of the Charles A. Weyerhaeuser and Musser Houses. The house faces east and features a ravine and an oxbow lake in the back, as well as a carriage house. It is of the Classical Revival style and contains two stories, an attic, and a basement. The frame of the house is constructed of wood with foundation walls of stone. The exterior is covered with clapboard siding. The house's rectangular main body is covered with a hipped roof, with sections of gable roof over a bay window at the front of the house and an extension in the back of the house. The windows' frames are corniced. Most of the windows are double-hung sash windows, though an oval window is on the south facade, near the front entryway. The front facade of the house is where the most dominant visual feature is. The front porch extends the whole length of the facade with circular pavilions at both ends. Tuscan columns on either way of the front stairs support a flat balcony protruding from the main body. The balcony has a balustraded rail and doubles as a roof, covering a screened porch on the second story of the house. Protruding from this porch are the roofs of the circular pavilion, which are connected by Ionic columns. Yet another porch can be found in the southwest corner of the house, by the kitchen. This porch is glass-enclosed.

== History ==
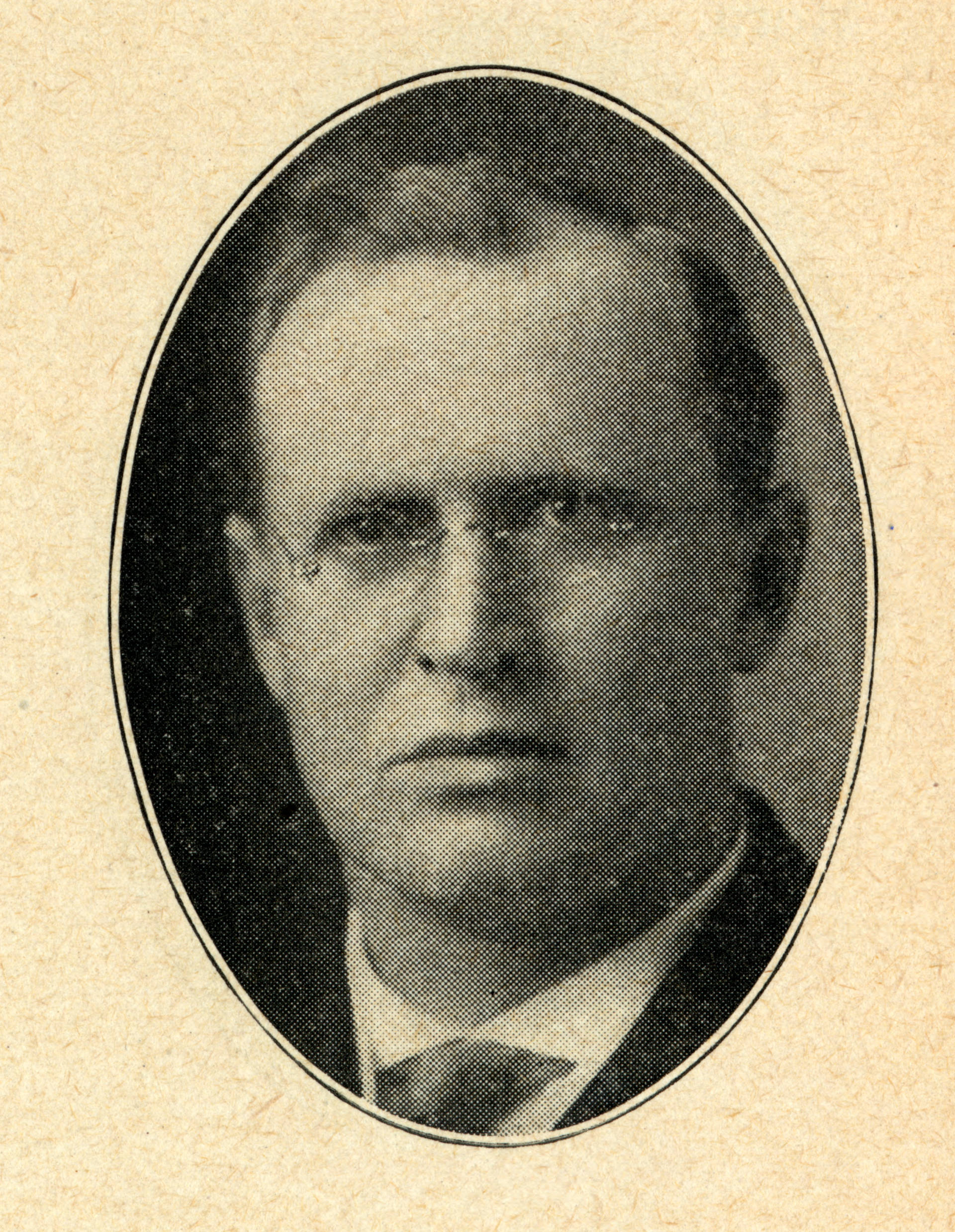
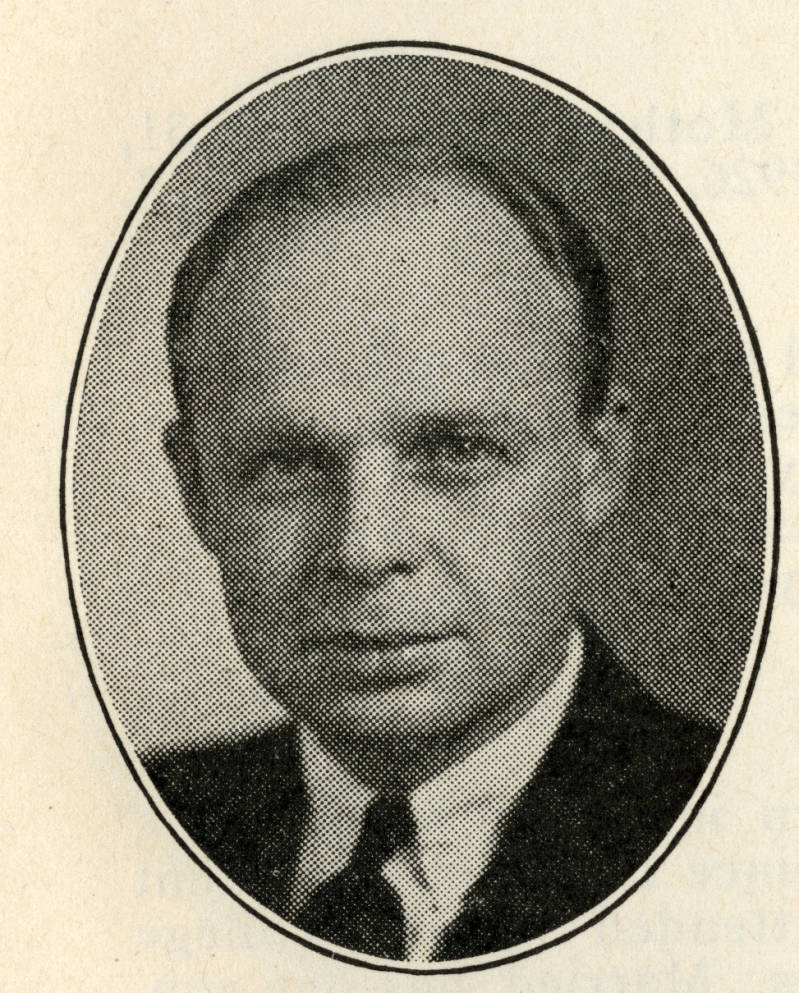
Christian and Gordon Rosenmeier

Barney Burton was the son of Polish immigrants, originally settling in Peoria, Illinois before moving up into Wisconsin. When he turned 18, he moved to St. Cloud, Minnesota and started a clothing business with his brother, Jacob. Seeking a better location, they moved to Little Falls in 1886. Little Falls was flourishing as a community due to the so-called "timber boom" years. Just like the community, the Burton's clothing business prospered. Barney became the sole owner of the business after Jacob left to pursue other ventures independently. Barney's business expanded into Central and North Minnesota, selling wool clothing to lumberjacks in the area. Burton married Sara Deutsch of Minneapolis in 1894. Deutsch died the following year during childbirth. Burton married her sister, Josephine, in 1898; they had three children in their lifelong relationship. In 1903, the family built a home in Little Falls following a pattern book from George F. Barber, a prominent architect. Burton remained prominent in Little Falls business activities until his death in 1942. Josephine died in 1953 in Baltimore.

Christian Rosenmeier was a prominent figure in Morrison County following his graduation from University of Minnesota Law School as president of his class in 1906. He originally established a law office in Royalton and married Linda Bakken. The couple had three children. Christian moved to Little Falls following his election as county attorney, a post he resigned from in 1920 to focus on his role as vice-president of American National Bank of Little Falls as well as the American Savings and Trust Company. In 1921, he became president of both companies. The same year, the Rosenmeiers purchased the Burton house and established it as a law office. The following year, Christian was elected to the Minnesota State Senate for the area, a post he held until his death in 1932. Christian was instrumental in designating the Charles A. Lindbergh House as a state park and the creation of Camp Ripley.

One of the three children, Gordon Rosenmeier, followed in his father's footsteps and graduated from Stanford University in 1932 after being admitted to the California State Bar. He returned to Minnesota and went into his father's law office, still in the former Burton house. Like his father, Gordon was elected to the state Senate in 1940. He joined the United States Navy in 1942 and won his Senate seat in absentia in 1944. He continued to keep his seat until 1971. Gordon still resided in the house when it became a registered Historic Place in 1986, with him listed as the owner of the house on the nomination form.
