= Frederick Joseph =

Frederick Joseph may refer to:

- Fred Joseph, former president and chief executive officer of Drexel Burnham Lambert
- Frederick Joseph (author), New York Times bestselling author
- Frederick Joseph Kinsman, Roman Catholic church historian
- Frederick Joseph Miller, American lawyer and politician
- Frederick Joseph Ryan, publisher of the Washington Post
