= Saint Luke's Protestant Episcopal Church (Kearney, Nebraska) =

Historic church in Nebraska, United States

- U.S. National Register of Historic Places
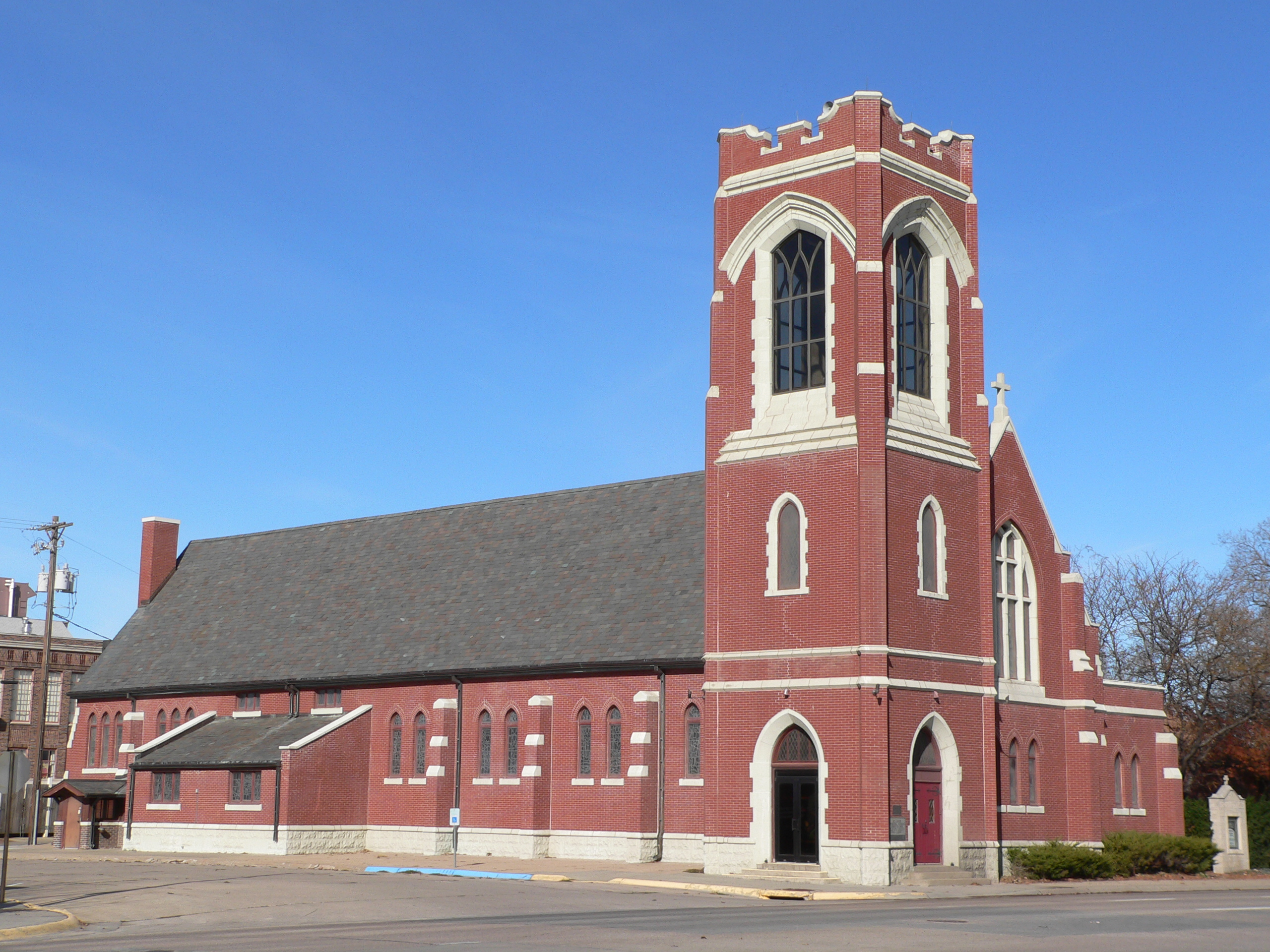

- Location within Nebraska Location within the United States
- Location: 2304 Second Ave., Kearney, Nebraska
- Coordinates: 40°42′20″N 99°5′35″W
- Area: less than one acre
- Built: 1908
- Architect: Sutcliffe, John
- Architectural style: Late Gothic Revival
- NRHP reference No.: 86003360
- Added to NRHP: December 1, 1986

Saint Luke's Protestant Episcopal Church (St. Luke's Episcopal Church) is a historic church at 2304 Second Avenue in Kearney, Nebraska. The church is a congregation of the Episcopal Diocese of Nebraska.

In 2015, the church reported 167 members; in 2023, it reported 185 members. No membership statistics were reported in 2024 national parochial reports. Plate and pledge financial support reported by the church in 2024 was $275,560. Average Sunday Attendance (ASA) reported in 2024 was 74 persons. This was a relative decrease from ASA of 94 reported in 2020.

== Building and history ==
The building was designed by Chicago architect John Sutcliffe and was built in 1908. It was added to the National Register in 1986. Its NRHP nomination asserted that it "is locally significant as a fine example of the late Gothic Revival style of architecture, not readily found in Buffalo County, Nebraska" and that its "interior is especially notable as it typifies old English church architecture."
