= Charles A. Weyerhaeuser and Musser Houses =

Historic houses in Minnesota, United States

- U.S. National Register of Historic Places
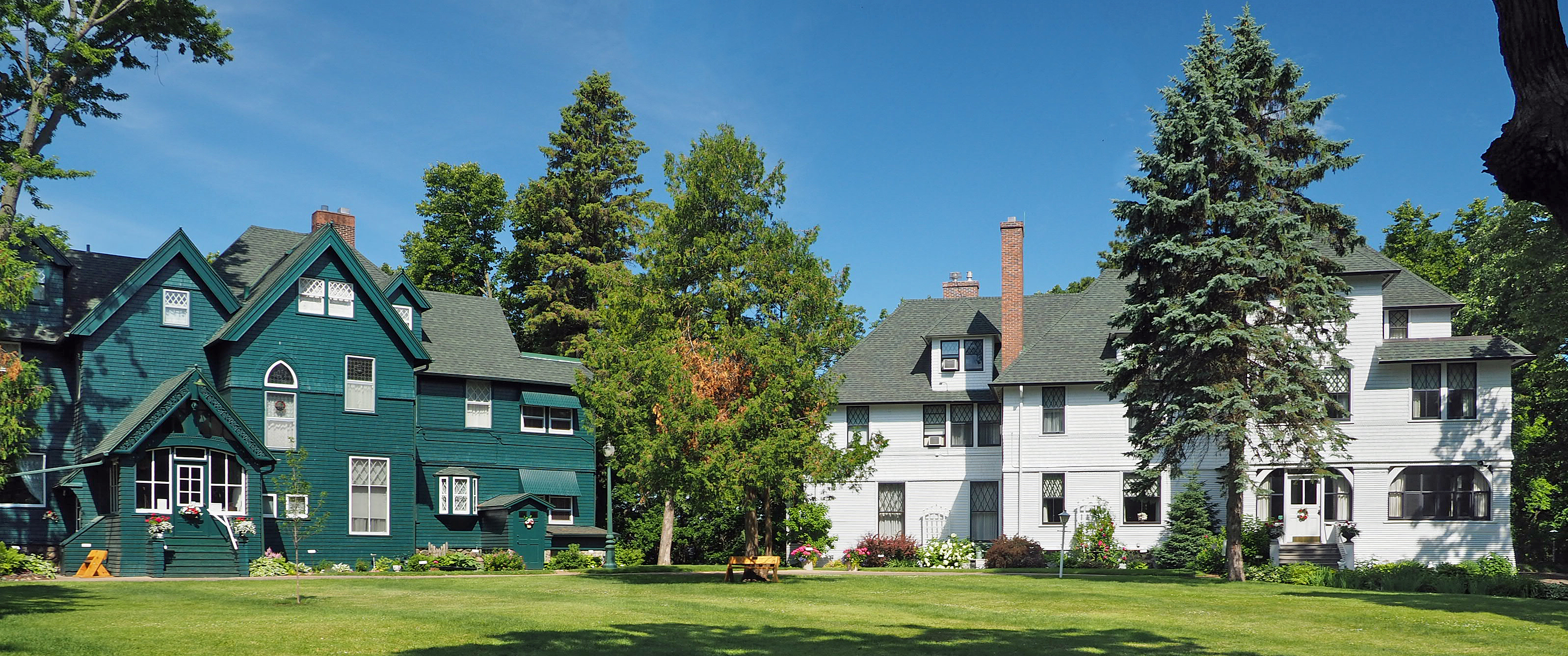
- Both houses from the exterior

- Location within Minnesota Location within the United States
- Interactive map showing the location of Weyerhaeuser and Musser Houses
- Location: 608 Highland Ave., Little Falls, Minnesota
- Coordinates: 45°58′15″N 94°21′57″W
- Area: 9 acres (3.6 ha)
- Built: 1898
- Built by: A.D. Harrison
- Architectural style: Shingle Style
- NRHP reference No.: 85001990
- Added to NRHP: September 5, 1985

The Charles A. Weyerhaeuser and Musser Houses are historic houses in Little Falls, Minnesota that were the homes of Charles Augustus Weyerhaeuser (1866-1930) and Richard Drew Musser (1865-1958), founders of the Pine Tree Lumber Company, a business that played a major role in the growth of Little Falls, as it built a strong lumber industry within the town. The houses were added to the National Register of Historic Places on September 5, 1985. The houses are now the location of the Linden Hill Historic Estate.

The houses were the location of a concert by famous pianist Van Cliburn after he won the inaugural International Tchaikovsky Competition.

== Description ==
From the official nomination form:

The Weyerhaeuser and Musser Houses occupy a wooded site along the Mississippi River, approximately one-half mile south of the commercial center of Little Falls. The site extends from the river, on the west, to 1st Street Southeast, on the east. 6th Avenue Southeast forms the southern boundary of the site. To the north is an oxbow of the Mississippi River and, near 1st Street, the Burton-Rosenmeier House. Both houses are placed alongside an entry drive which forms an extension to Highland Avenue. The houses lie at the top of a bank that drops down to a level plain adjacent to the river. A garage and service building is located at the southern end of this area, which also contains a playhouse, gazebo, and several vine-covered trellises. Sited on the bank adjoining the oxbow is a carriage house, which contains living quarters on its upper floor. In front of the houses, a lawn extends out to 1st Street. A pool, enclosed by a screened pavilion, is placed near the center of this lawn. A tennis court is adjacent to the pool. All ground are well-tended, and are planted with a variety of shrubs and flowers. Trees were planted over the entire site to provide a forest-like setting. Both the Weyerhaeuser and Musser Houses were built in the Shingle Style. The houses were relatively compact in 1898; neither Weyerhaeuser nor Musser were yet married. Each has been enlarged, but the additions that were made have been in keeping with the materials, styling, and proportions of the original houses. Similar materials are used on both houses. Exterior walls are clad primarily with shingles. The shingles are bellcast at the bottom of the second floor so that the floor line becomes clearly defined. Both are of wood-frame construction, and have two stories, large attics, and full basements, which are raised so that the main living rooms on the first floor are several feet above ground level. The buildings differ in plan, and in several of their details. The Weyerhaeuser House lies to the south of the Musser House. The main body of the house is rectangular. A front porch, originally open but now enclosed with glass panels, lies in front of a bay that projects out at the center of the main facade. Beside this entry is a smaller projecting bay that encloses the main stair. Both bays and the porch have gabled roofs, while the main body of the house is covered with a hipped roof. The house was extended to the north and south about 1910, with a sun room being constructed on the south side and a music room on the north. These extension replicate the shingle siding, stone foundations, and the roof and dormer configurations of the original house.
