= William Warren Two Rivers House Site and Peter McDougall Farmstead =

- U.S. National Register of Historic Places
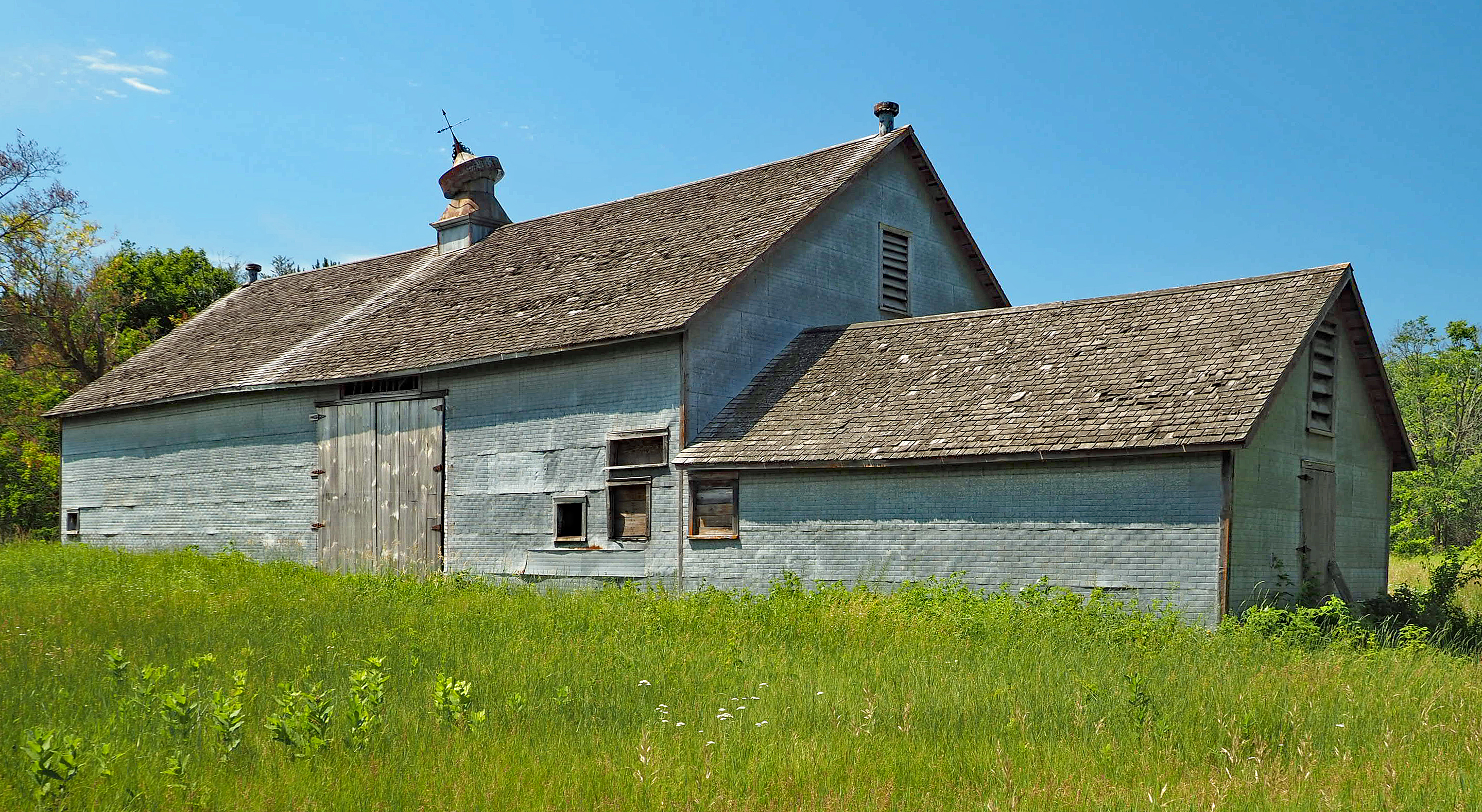
- The McDougall Barn

- Location within Minnesota Location within the United States
- Interactive map showing the location of William Warren Two Rivers House Site and Peter McDougall Farmstead
- Nearest city: Royalton, Minnesota
- Coordinates: 45°50′36″N 94°20′49″W
- Area: 2 acres (0.81 ha)
- Built: 1847
- Architectural style: Vernacular Canadian
- NRHP reference No.: 74001031
- Added to NRHP: December 7, 1974

The William Warren Two Rivers House Site and Peter McDougall Farmstead (commonly referred to as the Warren-McDougall Homestead) is a historic farmstead near Royalton, Minnesota. The site was built in 1847, and was where William Whipple Warren wrote his recounting of the history of the Ojibwe people, titled History of the Ojibways based upon Traditions and Oral Statements.

The preserves around the farmstead measure up to 215-acres and consist of 18 different vegetative types, including prairies, savannahs, forests, swamps, and woodlands. About 145 birds and 13 mammals have been observed around the homestead.

== Description ==
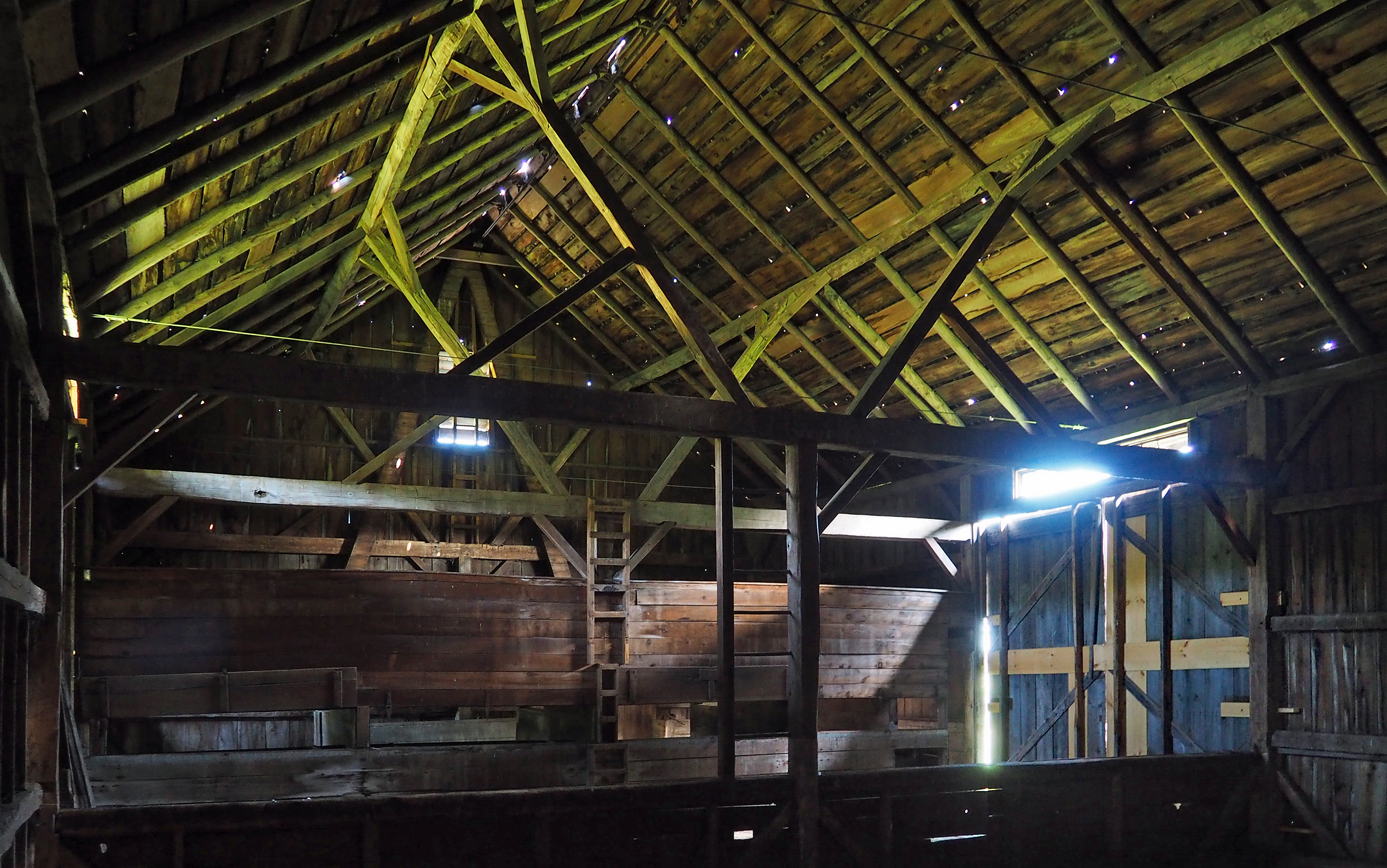
Interior of the McDougall Barn

The site consists of a farmhouse, blacksmith, machine shed, corn crib, three cellar depressions, and a four-bay barn with a granary and dairy shed attached. The site measures 100 yards long by 70 yards wide and is bordered by various natural and man-made barriers. On the east side, a wire fence is found. A small grove forms the north border. The west border is a levee which drops away from the site. A mix of trees and hedges makes up the south border. Located on an alluvial plain, the site is mostly level and overlooks the Mississippi River, which is less than a quarter-mile west of the site. All of the farmstead's buildings are of frame construction and have fieldstone foundations. The oldest building, the barn, was built in 1874, while the newest is the shed addition to the barn, completed in the early 20th century. The majority of the site's structures were completed prior to 1900.

The farmhouse is the northernmost structure and measures two stories. It is a simple gabled roof structure that has a symmetrical facade and does not feature any ornamentation. Though vernacular in style, the farmhouse more closely resembles those of the eastern United States and Canada than the Midwestern United States. A summer kitchen and woodshed are attached to the house in a one-story gabled wing. It is located in a grove of oak and fir trees. To the south of the farmhouse, a row of three structures is present. The first in this row is the blacksmith, which has windows and a chimney. The original door was replaced with a garage door. Between the blacksmith and the machine shed and a few feet to the west was the site of the James McDougall cabin and the first Two Rivers post office. A cellar depression is still visible at the location of the cabin. The machine shed, the second building in the row, was designed in the English barn style and has retained three original doors. One set was replaced with a sliding door. The last building in the row, the corn crib, was unique for its resemblance to a shed and its sliding doors. The structures in the row were constructed in the late 19th century. The barn, like the machine shed, was constructed in the English barn style. It was also built in the mortise and tenon fashion, with pegged joinery and hand-hewn timber. Both center bays acted as hubs for grain harvesting, with the north acting as a drive-through for wagons and the south containing a threshing floor. The end bays have two levels, with the bottom level containing stalls for cattle and oxen and the top level acting as a hay loft. A one-story granary extends to the north and a dairy shed extends to the west. The exterior is cased in tin, but the original board and batten siding is still present in the interior. Two cellar depressions belonging to buildings relating to William Warren are present to the west of the barn. The northern depression was the location of the Warren cabin, while it is not known what was occupied at the location of the southern depression. Most likely, the southern depression was the site of Warren's trading post or barn.
