= John B. Sutcliffe =

English and American architect (1853–1913)

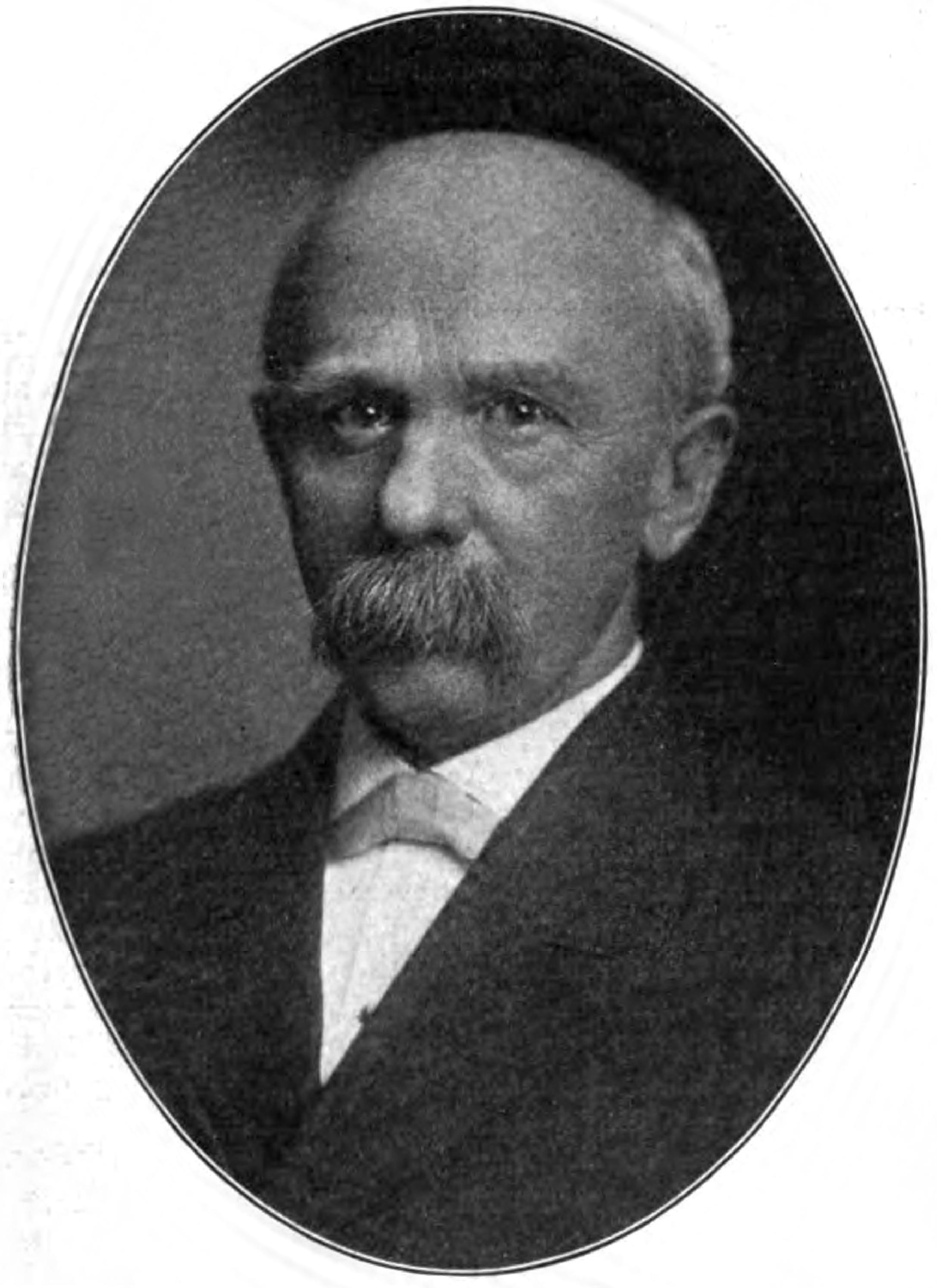

John B. Sutcliffe (March 28, 1853 – October 23, 1913) was an English-born American architect.

== Biography ==
=== United Kingdom ===
John Sutcliffe was born in Bacup, in the county of Lancashire, England, on March 28, 1853, the son of John and Martha (Townend) Sutcliffe. His paternal grandfather was a builder in Todmorden, Yorkshire. His paternal great-grandfather was a wool manufacturer; his maternal grandfather, John Townend, was a large colliery owner in Lancashire. John's father was a large contractor, who failed in business as a result of the depression brought about in that part of England by the American Civil War. He subsequently became an architect and civil engineer and in 1864, his son John left school to enter his father's business.

Sutcliffe attended evening classes at the Science and Art School for many years and, as a result of his work outside of business hours, he won the gold medal for architecture from the South Kensington Museum, where he graduated in architecture and art. He also won the bronze medal for descriptive geometry, and numerous other prizes and diplomas. From 1875 to 1877, he was a draughtsman for Robert B. Dixon, of Darlington and from 1877 to 1878, he worked for Osborne & Reading, Birmingham. From 1878 to 1882, he was engaged as an architect at Bacup, and in 1878, he designed the buildings for a school in Crimsworth near Hebden Bridge. From 1882 to 1886, he was chief draughtsman in the British government's dockyard at Portsmouth.

== United States ==
=== New York and Alabama ===
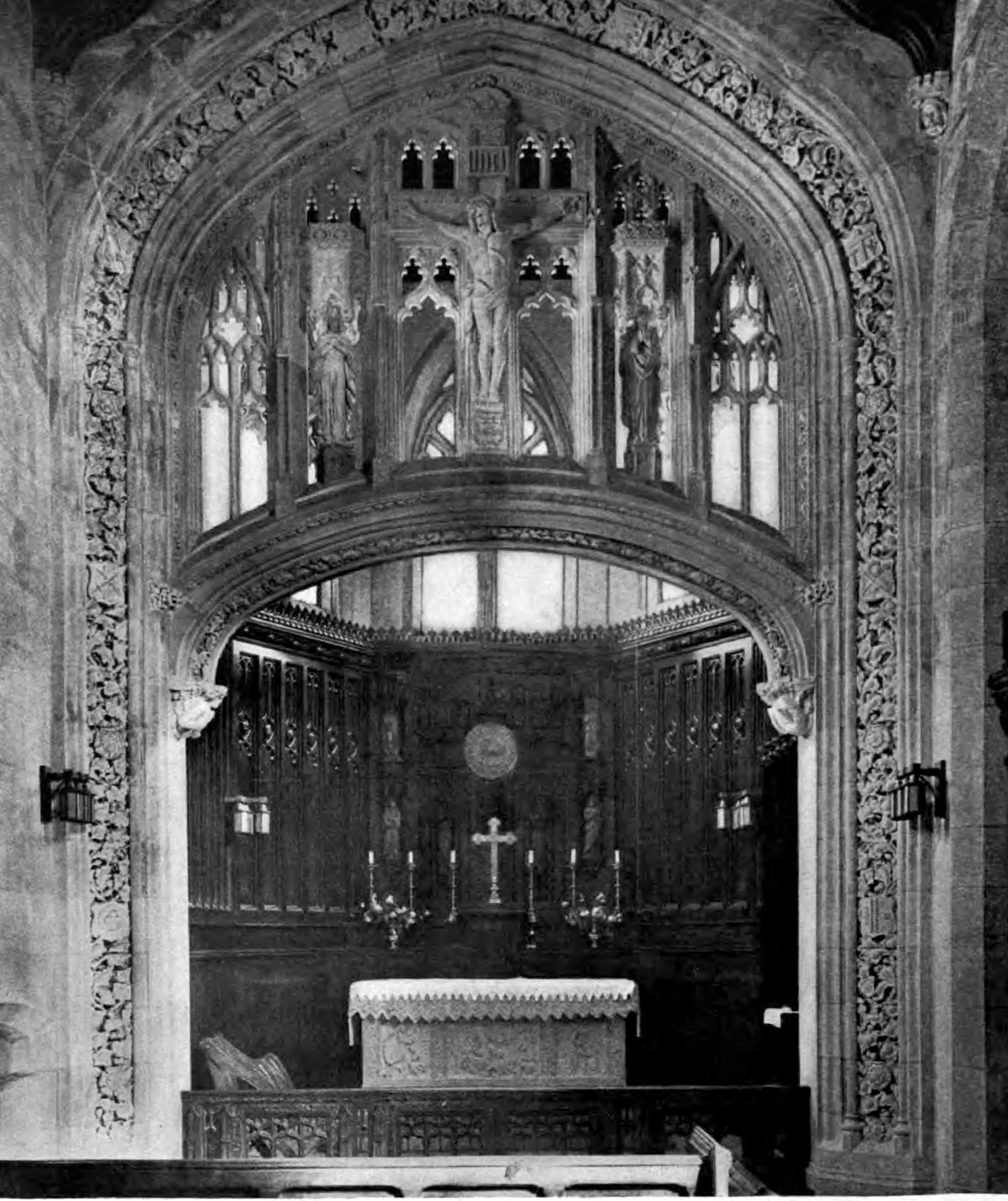
Rood Screen, St. Luke's, Evanston

In 1886, he emigrated to America, working first for J.A. Wood in New York City, and then on the staff of The American Architect in Boston, and in December moved to Birmingham, AL, where the following year he founded the Alabama Association of Architects. John Sutcliffe is mentioned in a civil lawsuit with which he was connected while working in Alabama, which was heard by the Supreme Court of Alabama in 1895, regarding an unpaid bill for architectural work of $29.05. (Note: The debt had been assigned to a third party but in the meantime, the defendant paid the debt to Sutcliffe (the original creditor). The court held that the defendant must pay the debt twice because he had not informed the assignee, within the time period required by statute, that he had in fact paid off the debt.)

Among the buildings he designed in Alabama is St. Mary's-on-the-Highlands Episcopal Church (1891–92).

=== Illinois ===
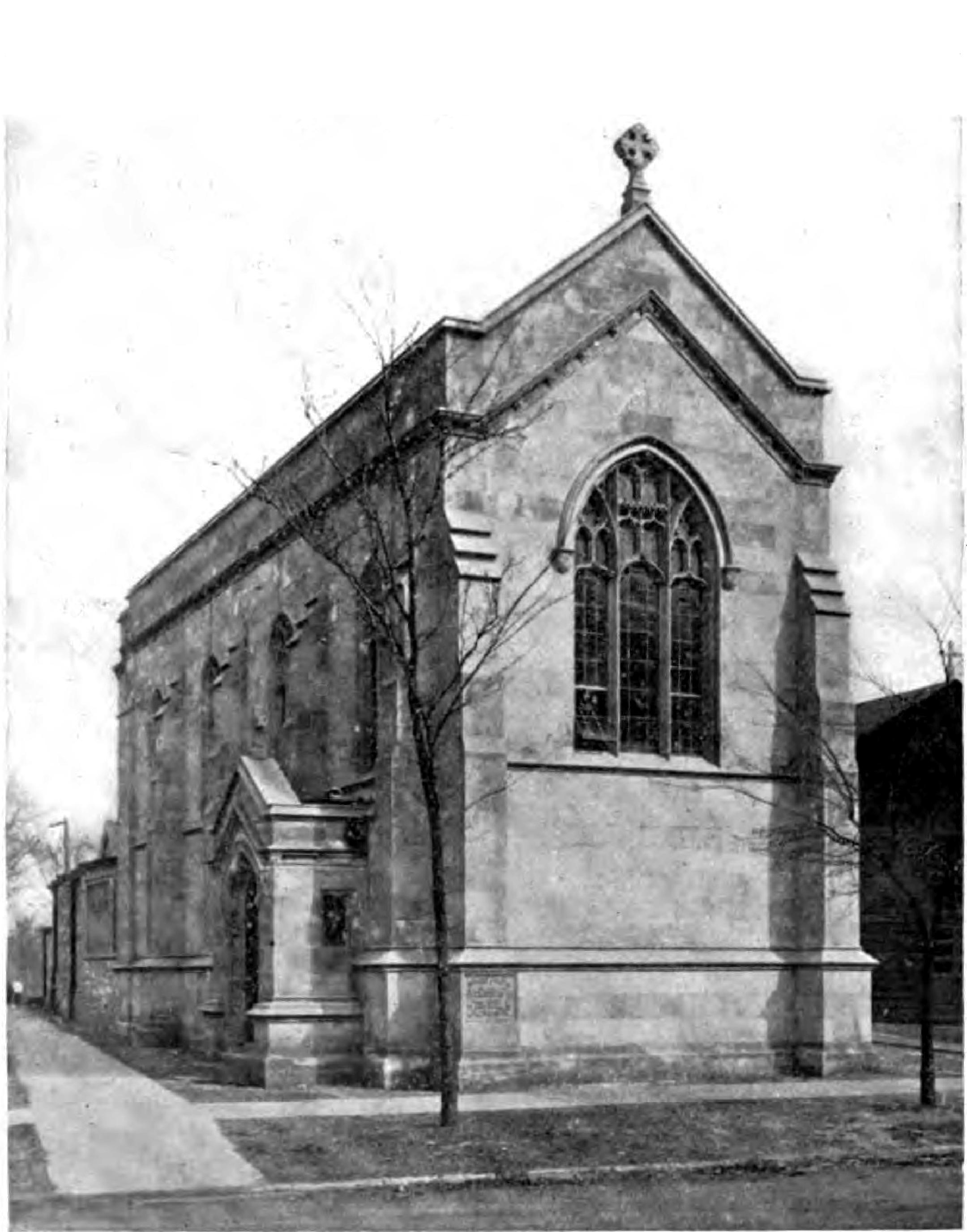
Exterior of St. Luke's, Evanston

In 1892 he moved to Chicago. He built on his success at St. Mary's in Birmingham, by beginning to specialize in Gothic design and church architecture and found his true vocation. Examples of his churches include:

- The Cathedral Church of St. Paul, Springfield, IL,
- St. Luke's Church, Evanston, and
- Grace Church, Oak Park.
- St. Elizabeth's Church, Glencoe
- Christ Church, Chicago, c. 1908

Sutcliffe was the official architect for the Episcopal Diocese of Springfield. Sutcliffe was a member of the Chicago Architects’ Business Association.

=== Arkansas ===
In 1897, Sutcliffe designed St John's Episcopal Church, Helena, AR, which was completed in 1899 but burned down in 1914. Sutcliffe was the Diocesan Architect for the Diocese of Arkansas.

=== Other churches ===
Other churches designed by Sutcliffe in the United States are:

- St. John's Church, Sturgis, Michigan
- Christ Church, Pensacola, Florida (Note: This is not Old Christ Church (Pensacola, Florida))
- Church of Our Savior, Little Falls, Minnesota
- St. Andrew's Church, Ashland, Wisconsin
- St. Thomas Church, Plymouth, Indiana
- St. James Church, Dundee, Illinois
- Emmanuel Episcopal Church, Rushford, Minnesota
- St. John's Episcopal Church, New London, Wisconsin
- St. Paul's Church, Savannah, Georgia
- St. Luke's Protestant Episcopal Church, Kearney, Nebraska
- Trinity Episcopal Church, Houghton, Michigan

=== Other buildings ===
In 1910, Sutcliffe designed the Frances Donaldson Library at Nashotah House Theological Seminary in Wisconsin.

=== Personal life and death ===
On 13 May 1879, Sutcliffe married Lydia Sophia Knight of Saint Helier, Jersey.

Sutcliffe died at his home in Oak Park, on October 23, 1913. He was survived by his wife and five children, Arthur George, Helen Mary, Clara Mabel, Edwin Alan and Isabel Ray. His second son, Edwin, also became an architect. Funeral services were held at Grace Church. There was a requiem celebration of the Holy Communion. He was interred at Oak Ridge Cemetery.

== Publications ==
- John Sutcliffe (March 1908) "Washington Cathedral", Christian Art, Vol. 2, No. 6, Richard G. Badger Publisher, Boston

== Gallery ==
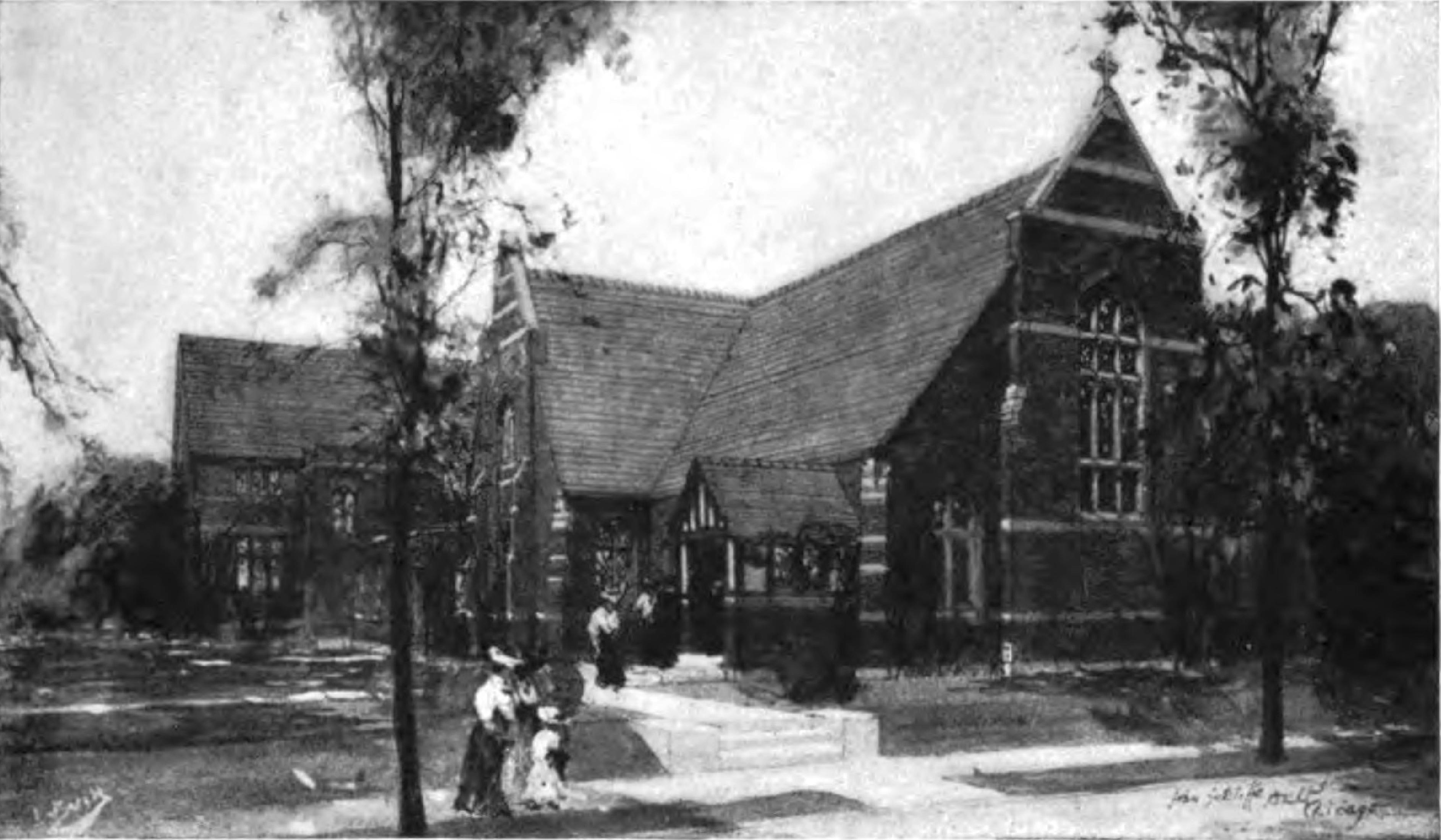
St. Paul's Church, Savannah, Georgia; photograph signed by John Sutcliffe

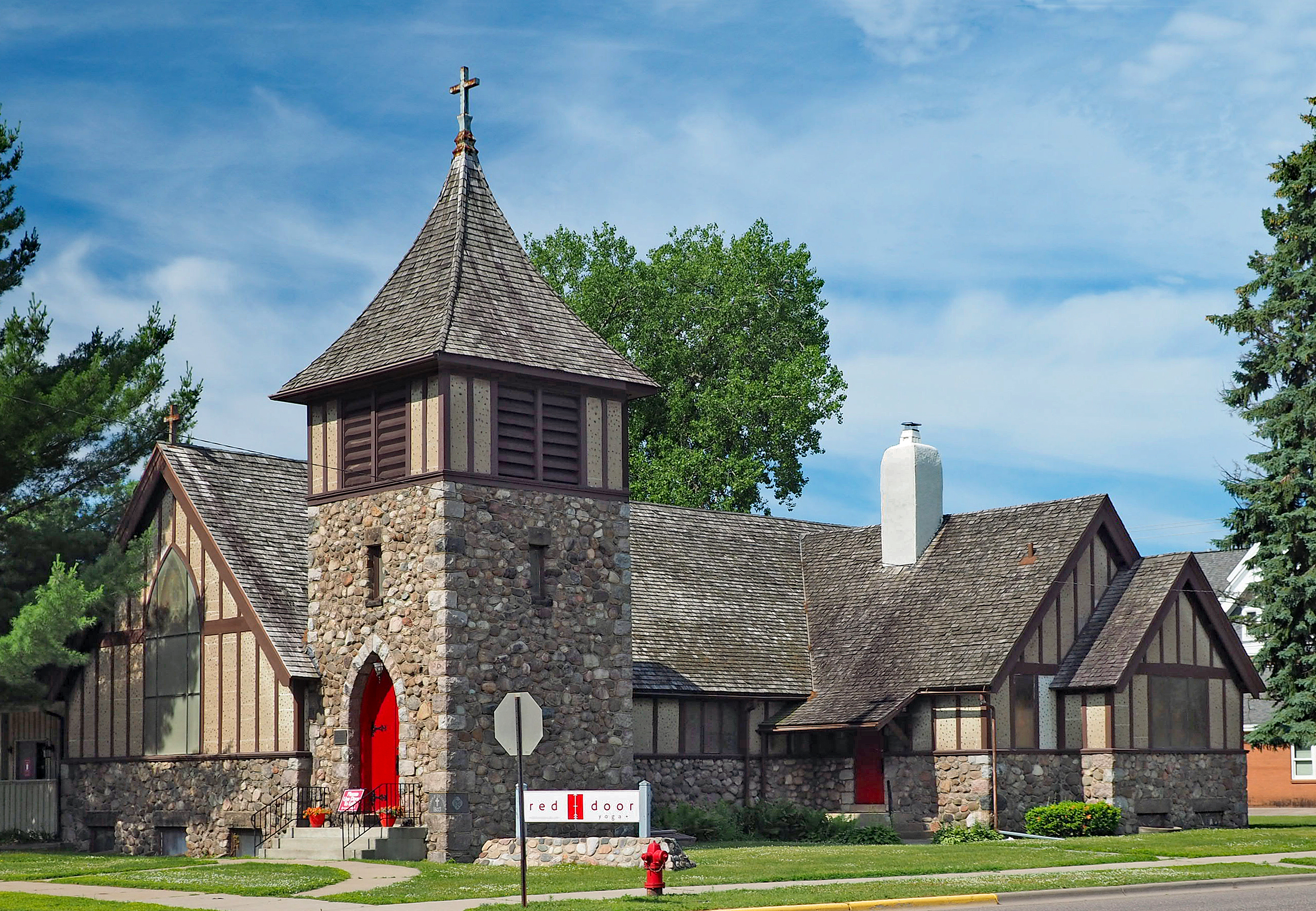
Church of Our Savior, Little Falls, Minnesota

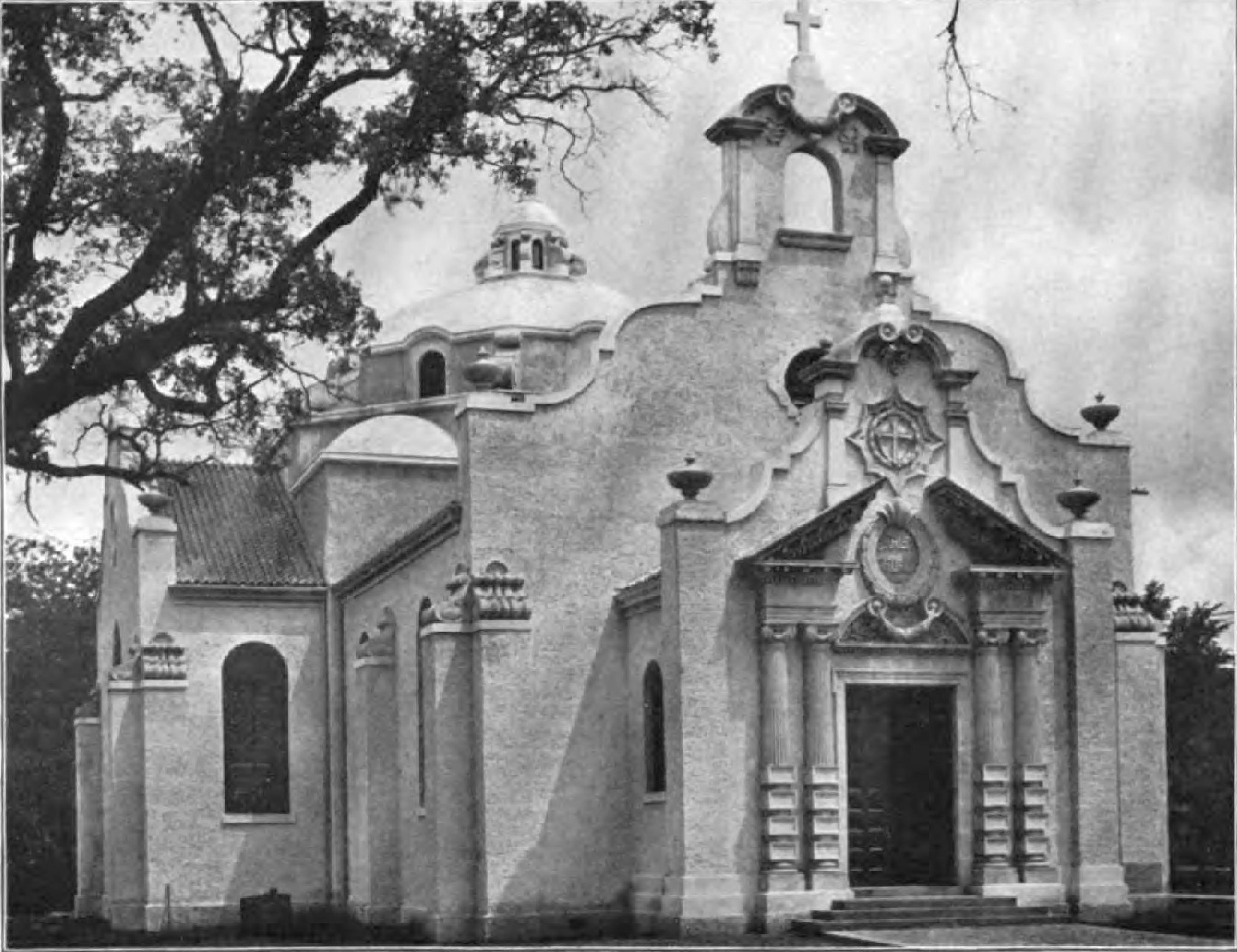
Christ Church, Pensacola, Florida

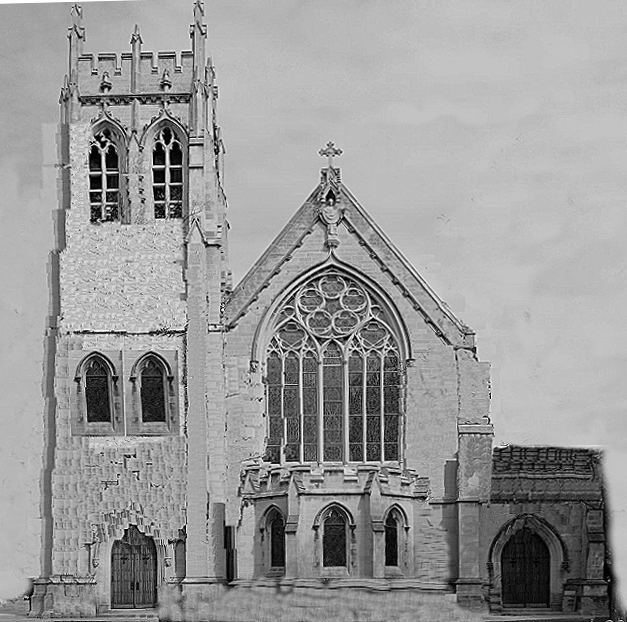
Grace Episcopal Church, Oak Park, Illinois
