= Fort Duquesne (Minnesota) =

- U.S. National Register of Historic Places
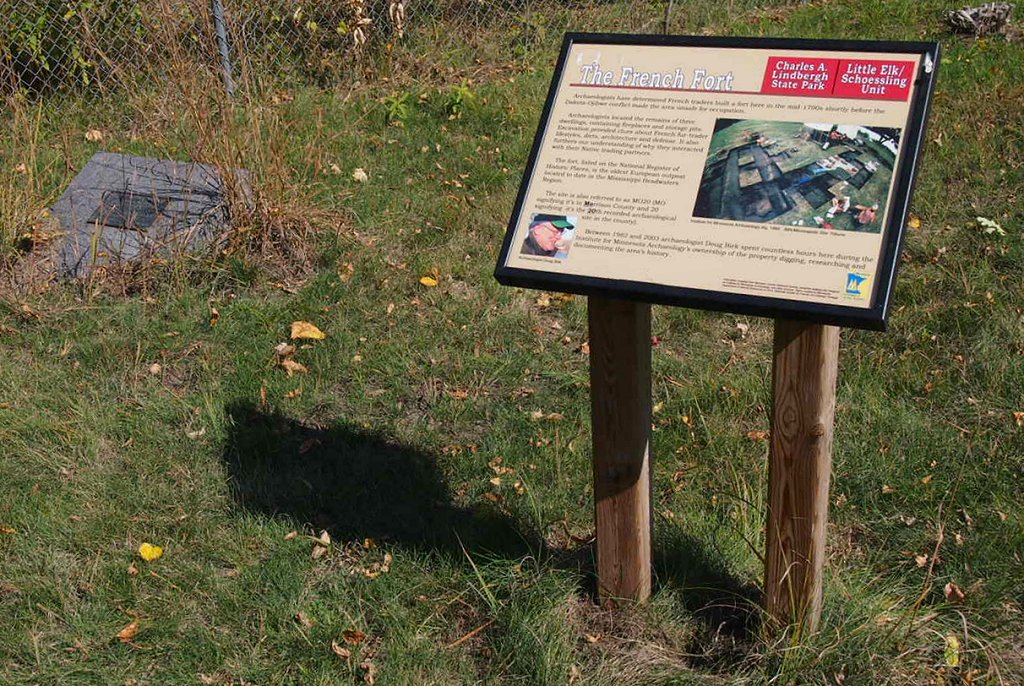
- Sign at the site of the fort's remains

- Location within Minnesota Location within the United States
- Location: near Little Falls, Minnesota
- Coordinates: 46.012397°N 94.358579°W
- Area: 1.5 acres (0.61 ha)
- Built: c. 1750
- NRHP reference No.: 84000452
- Added to NRHP: November 15, 1984

Fort Duquesne is a historical French former fur trade post. It was built c. 1750 and was first discovered in 1983. The following year, on November 15, 1984, the site was added to the National Register of Historic Places. The site is about two miles north of Little Falls, on the west side of the Mississippi River. Since 2004, the site is part of the Charles A. Lindbergh State Park, as a result of a law passed by the Minnesota Legislature.

The fort was about 75 by 150 feet and consisted of three to five buildings. After being only used for one to two years, it was destroyed by a fire. The fort also has been described with having 13-foot wooden walls. Hand-painted bowls, glass beads, and gunflint were all discovered at the site.
