= Frederick Joseph Miller =

American politician

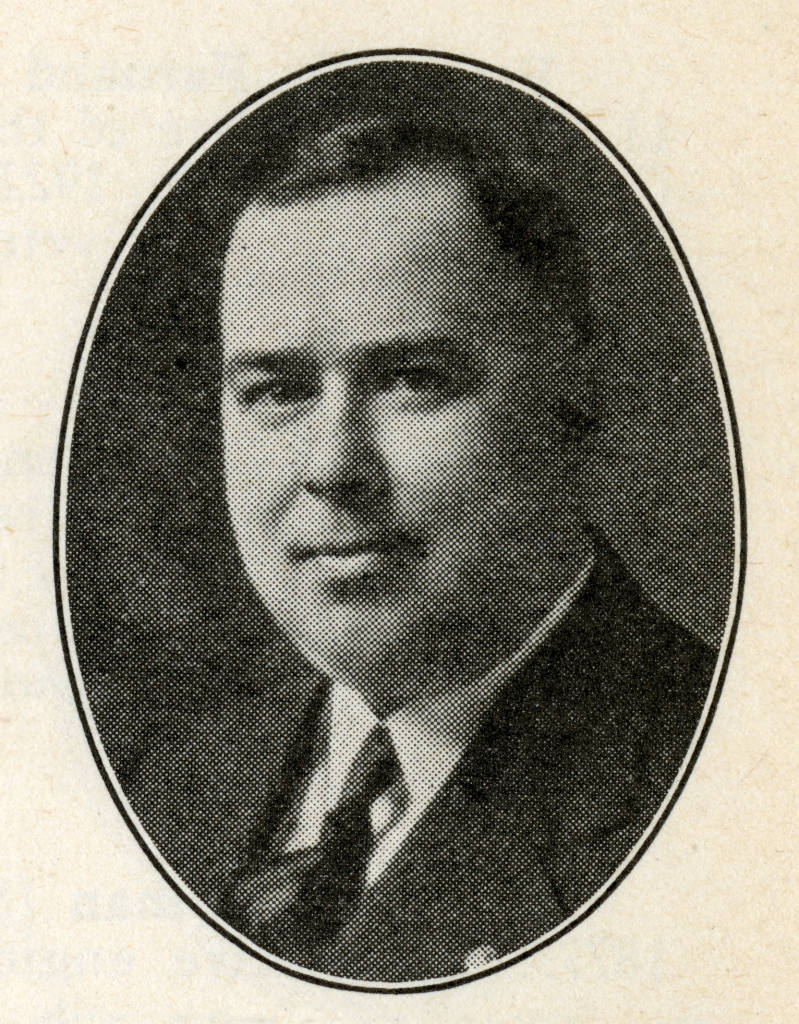
- Miller's official portrait for the 1935-36 Legislative session

Member of the Minnesota Senate
- In office 1935–1940

Mayor of Little Falls, Minnesota
- In office 1926–1927

District Attorney of Morrison County, Minnesota
- In office 1927–1930

Personal details
- Born: March 15, 1891 Saint Paul, Minnesota
- Died: August 26, 1940 (aged 49) Rochester, Minnesota
- Education: University of Minnesota Law School (1912)
- Profession: Lawyer

Military service
- Branch/service: United States Army
- Rank: Captain

Frederick Joseph Miller (March 15, 1891 – August 26, 1940) was an American politician and lawyer.

Miller was born in Saint Paul, Minnesota and graduated from Central High School in Saint Paul. He received his law degree from University of Minnesota Law School in 1912 and was admitted to the Minnesota bar. Miller served in the United States Army during World War I and was commissioned a captain. Miller practiced law in Pine River, Minnesota. He then moved to Little Falls, Minnesota, in 1921, and continued to practice law. Miller served as city attorney for Little Falls, Minnesota from 1923 to 1924 and as mayor of Little Falls from 1926 to 1927. He served as district attorney of Morrison County, Minnesota 1927 to 1930 and in the office of the Minnesota Attorney General from 1930 to 1932. Miller served in the Minnesota Senate from 1935 until his death in 1940. Miller died suddenly from a heart attack in Rochester, Minnesota.
