= Pine Tree Lumber Company Office Building =

- U.S. National Register of Historic Places
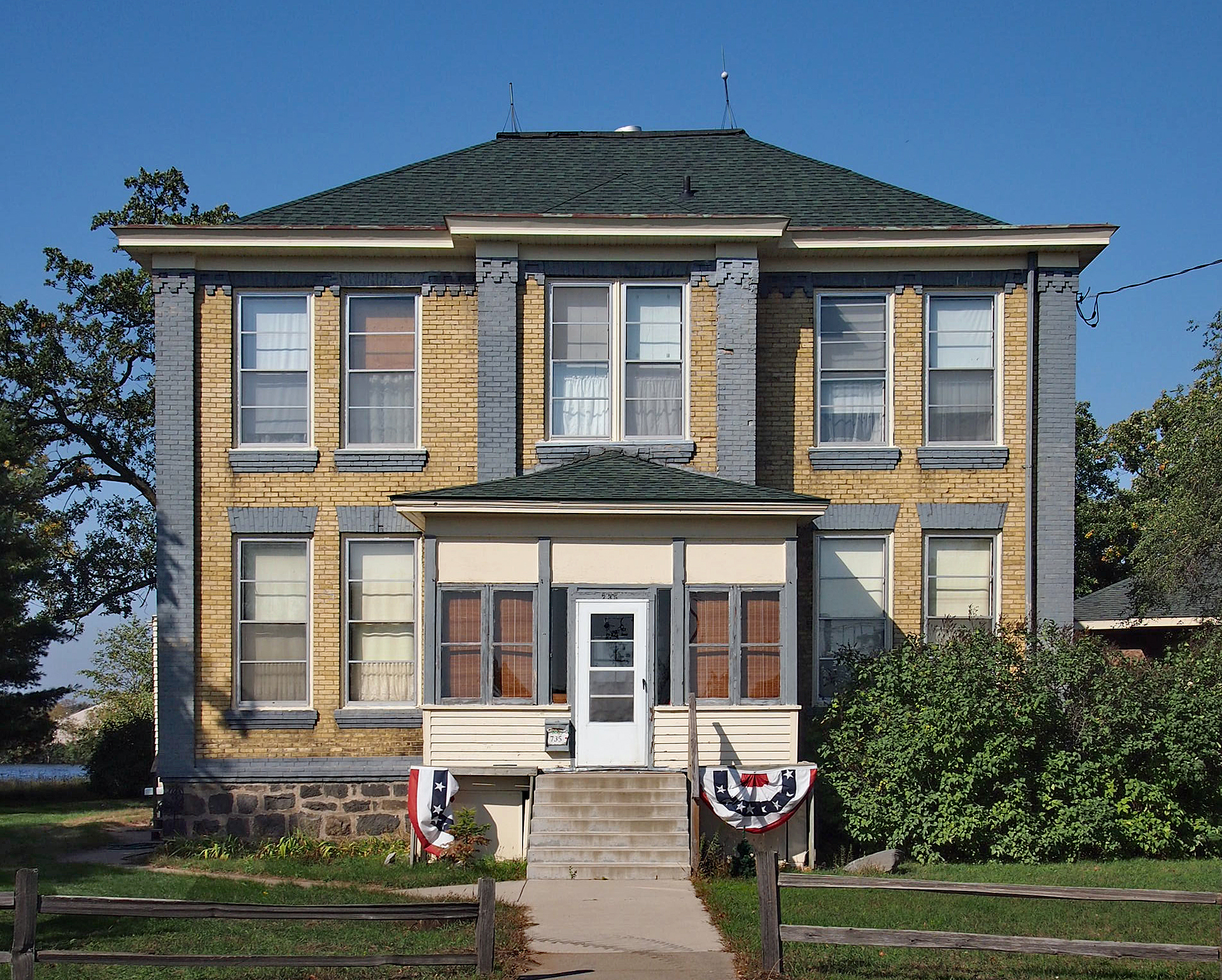
- Front of the office building

- Location within Minnesota Location within the United States
- Map showing the location of Pine Tree Lumber Company Office Building
- Location: 735 1st St., NE, Little Falls, Minnesota
- Coordinates: 45°59′04″N 94°21′37″W
- Area: less than one acre
- Built: 1891
- Architectural style: Classical Revival, Italianate
- NRHP reference No.: 85001991
- Added to NRHP: September 5, 1985

The Pine Tree Lumber Company Office Building is a historic building in Little Falls, Minnesota. It was built in 1891 as a headquarters for the Pine Tree Lumber Company, headed by Charles Weyerhaeuser and Richard Musser. The building was added to the National Register of Historic Places on September 5, 1985.

Little Falls was chosen as the location for the company because of its location on the Mississippi River and because of the Northern Pacific Railway that ran through the time. The business was a part of the "timber boom" years for Little Falls, a time of great development, notably reflected in the Little Falls Commercial Historic District. It is the last remaining building associated with the business.

== Description ==
The building is located in a wooded area on the east shore of the Mississippi River, about a half-mile north of Little Falls' commercial center. It faces east on First Street, one of the major roads in the town. A spur track and bridge of the Northern Pacific Railway can be found on the northern boundary of the building. This rail line served the company's processing facilities on both sides of the river. Immediately north of the spur line and house was the east shore lumber mill. The house has a two-story rectangular body constructed of brick. It is built on a raised granite foundation and covered with a hipped roof that features a flat top in the center. Curved dormers, referred to as "eyebrow dormers", are present on the north and south sides of the roof and provide light to the attic. Flat arched windows come in pairs and are placed in pier-defined bays. Centered in the rear facade, a two-story extension measuring 15 by 25 feet is present. Enclosed porches at the entrances of the front and back of the building, along with the northwest corner of the building. Many of the building's elements are symmetrical, including cornices, lintels, and sills. These elements also emphasize the Italianate and classical revival architecture that ever present throughout the area's commercial buildings. The dominant features are the oversized windows of the building, which further emphasize the commercial use of the building rather than resident use. In 1927, however, the building was sold and the interior offices were turned into apartments.

=== Company overview ===
The Pine Tree Lumber Company was founded in Little Falls between 1890 and 1892 by a sizable number of lumber magnates from Wisconsin and Minnesota. Of these magnates, perhaps the most famous was Frederick Weyerhaeuser. The company was considered his entrance into the Minnesotan lumber market. Commercial operations began in Little Falls on May 18, 1891. Employing around 500 men, the company's facilities quickly became the town's largest industry, with 60 million feet of pine wood cut and ten million laths produced annually. A 1915 book listed Charles Weyerhauser, Frederick's son, as the president. The company also had saw mills in Oregon and Washington. After reaching its production peak in 1902, less and less wood came out of the facilities, and the company closed its doors around 1920.
