= Franklin E. Ebner =

American politician (1904–1979)

Member of the Minnesota Senate from the 53rd district
- In office January 3, 1933 – January 6, 1935

Personal details
- Born: April 29, 1904 Aitkin, Minnesota, U.S.
- Died: May 10, 1979 (aged 75) Minneapolis, Minnesota, U.S.
- Children: 1
- Education: University of Minnesota
- Occupation: Politician, lawyer, businessman

Military service
- Allegiance: United States
- Branch/service: United States Army

Franklin E. Ebner (April 29, 1904 – May 10, 1979) was an American politician, lawyer, and businessman.

Ebner was born in Aitkin, Aitkin County, Minnesota. He received his law degree from the University of Minnesota Law School in 1929. Ebner lived in Brainerd, Crow Wing County, Minnesota and practiced law in Brainerd. He served in the United States Army. Ebner served in the Minnesota Senate in 1933 and 1934. He also served as the Crow Wing County Attorney. Ebner died at the University of Minnesota Hospitals in Minneapolis, Minnesota.
