= Church of Our Savior (Little Falls, Minnesota) =

Historic church in Minnesota, United States

- Church of Our Savior--Episcopal
- U.S. National Register of Historic Places
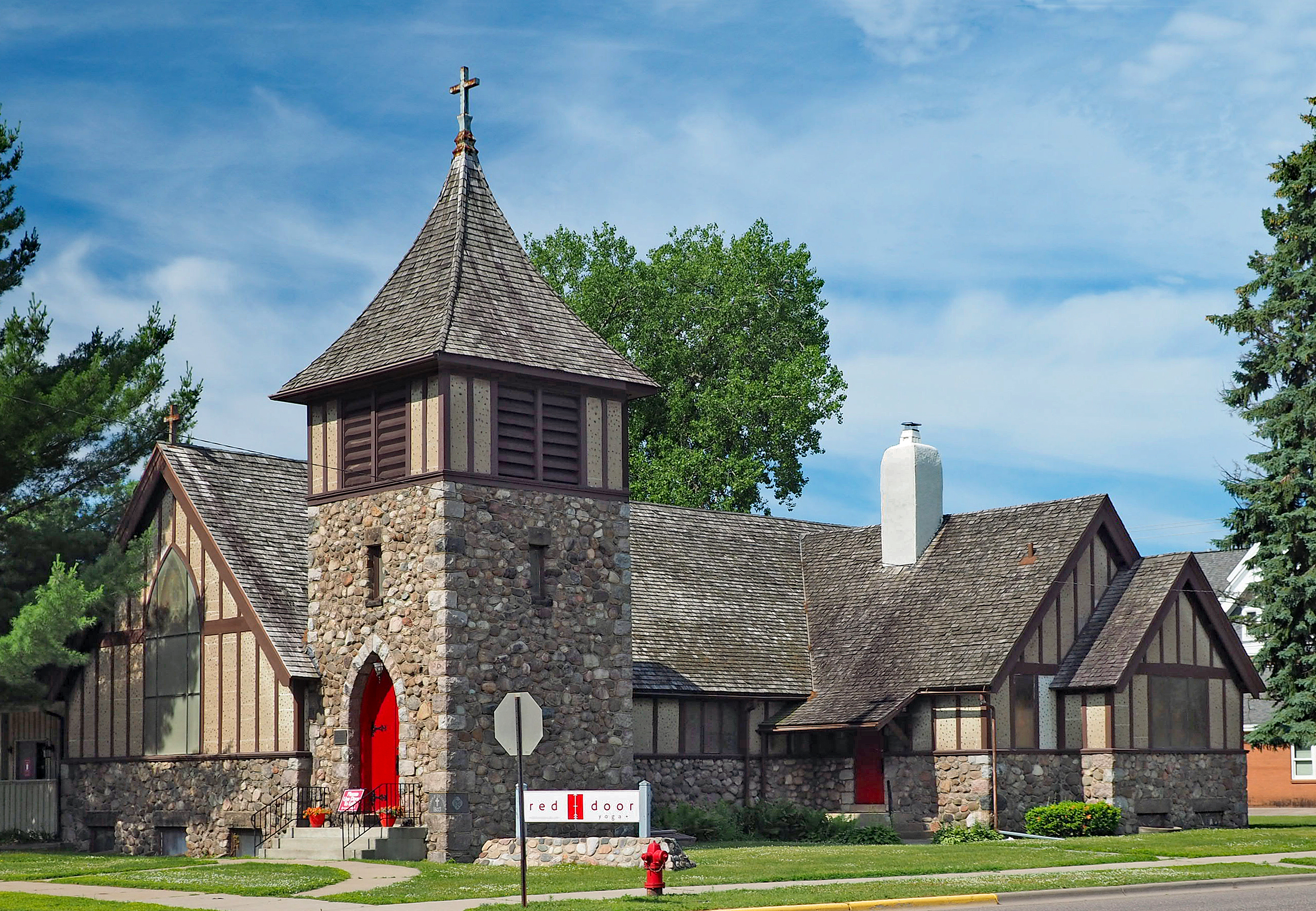
- Church of Our Savior from the northeast

- Location within Minnesota Location within the United States
- Location: 113 4th Street NE, Little Falls, Minnesota
- Coordinates: 45°58′36″N 94°21′28″W
- Area: less than one acre
- Built: 1903
- Built by: Louis Triplett
- Architect: John Lutcliff
- NRHP reference No.: 80002090
- Added to NRHP: July 17, 1980

Episcopal Church of Our Savior is a historic church at 113 4th Street NE in Little Falls, Minnesota, United States. It housed a congregation of the Episcopal Diocese of Minnesota.

== History and buildings ==
The congregation was established around 1858, as a missionary effort by Bishop Henry Whipple and they built their first building around that time. The second church was built in 1869. The current building, built in 1903, was designed by John B. Sutcliffe from Chicago and built by Louis Triplett, a local builder. Its design blends Gothic and Tudor styles. The lower walls and foundation are built of fieldstone, while the upper sections of the walls are half-timbered with stucco. The corner tower is also made of fieldstone, topped by a bell tower with a flared shingled roof.

The church was listed on the National Register of Historic Places in 1980. The nomination states, "The Church of Our Savior is an excellent and well-preserved example of the second generation of Episcopal churches constructed in Minnesota. Its style is more an echo of England and a reflection of early twentieth century eclecticism than a variation on the Upjohn churches characteristic of Episcopal churches constructed in Minnesota during the late nineteenth century—the so-called "Whipple Churches'."
