= Royalton, Minnesota =

City in Minnesota, United States

- City
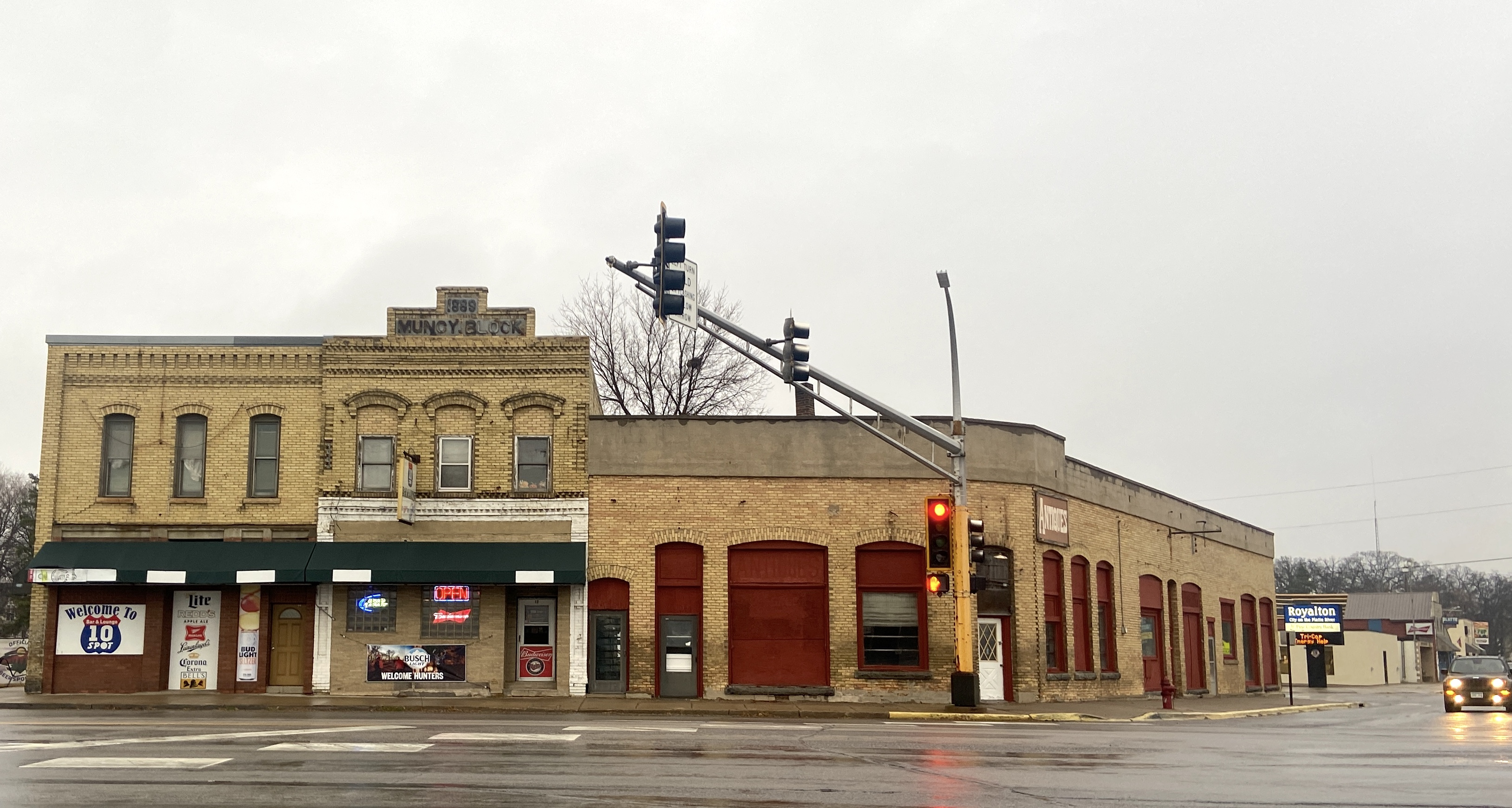
- Downtown Royalton

- Location in Morrison County and the state of Minnesota
- Coordinates: 45°49′49″N 94°17′33″W
- Country: United States
- State: Minnesota
- Counties: Morrison, Benton

Area
  - Total: 2.01 sq mi (5.20 km^{2})
  - Land: 2.01 sq mi (5.20 km^{2})
  - Water: 0 sq mi (0.00 km^{2})
- Elevation: 1,083 ft (330 m)

Population (2020)
  - Total: 1,281
  - Density: 638.5/sq mi (246.51/km^{2})
- Time zone: UTC-6 (Central (CST))
  - Summer (DST): UTC-5 (CDT)
- ZIP code: 56373
- Area code: 320
- FIPS code: 27-56176
- GNIS feature ID: 2396444
- Website: cityofroyaltonmn.gov

Royalton is a city in Morrison and Benton counties in the U.S. state of Minnesota, along the Platte River. The population was 1,281 at the 2020 census. The city is located mainly within Morrison County.

The Benton County portion of Royalton is part of the St. Cloud metropolitan area.

== History ==
Royalton was platted in 1878, and named after Royalton, Vermont, the native home of a share of the early settlers. Royalton was incorporated in 1887.

Royalton has been a participant with Green Step Cities since its inception in 2010 and became the first municipal building in Minnesota to install solar PV panels with a 7 kW array on the roof of City Hall.

== Geography ==
Royalton is in southern Morrison County and extends south into the northwest corner of Benton County. The city is bordered to the north, east and west by Bellevue Township in Morrison County and to the south by Langola Township in Benton County. U.S. Highway 10 is the main route in the community, leading north 11 miles (18 km) to Little Falls, the Morrison county seat, and southeast 19 miles (31 km) to Sauk Rapids.

According to the U.S. Census Bureau, Royalton has a total area of 2.01 square miles (5.21 km^{2}), all of it recorded as land. The Platte River passes through the east side of the city, flowing south 5 miles (8 km) to the Mississippi River.

== Demographics ==
Historical population
Census	Pop.	Note	%±
1890	582		—
1900	664		14.1%
1910	676		1.8%
1920	690		2.1%
1930	518		−24.9%
1940	518		0.0%
1950	500		−3.5%
1960	580		16.0%
1970	534		−7.9%
1980	660		23.6%
1990	802		21.5%
2000	816		1.7%
2010	1,242		52.2%
2020	1,281		3.1%
U.S. Decennial Census

=== 2010 census ===
As of the census of 2010, there were 1,242 people, 455 households, and 324 families living in the city. The population density was 624.1 inhabitants per square mile (241.0/km^{2}). There were 487 housing units at an average density of 244.7 per square mile (94.5/km^{2}). The racial makeup of the city was 99.0% White, 0.4% Asian, and 0.6% from two or more races. Hispanic or Latino of any race were 0.9% of the population.

There were 455 households, of which 42.9% had children under the age of 18 living with them, 56.7% were married couples living together, 8.6% had a female householder with no husband present, 5.9% had a male householder with no wife present, and 28.8% were non-families. 23.3% of all households were made up of individuals, and 7.7% had someone living alone who was 65 years of age or older. The average household size was 2.70 and the average family size was 3.18.

The median age in the city was 30.6 years. 31.6% of residents were under the age of 18; 7.9% were between the ages of 18 and 24; 30.1% were from 25 to 44; 20.8% were from 45 to 64; and 9.4% were 65 years of age or older. The gender makeup of the city was 50.1% male and 49.9% female.

=== 2000 census ===
As of the census of 2000, there were 816 people, 322 households, and 209 families living in the city. The population density was 473.7 inhabitants per square mile (182.9/km^{2}). There were 328 housing units at an average density of 190.4 per square mile (73.5/km^{2}). The racial makeup of the city was 98.77% White, 0.25% Native American, 0.49% Pacific Islander, and 0.49% from two or more races. Hispanic or Latino of any race were 0.86% of the population.

There were 322 households, out of which 34.8% had children under the age of 18 living with them, 51.2% were married couples living together, 8.7% had a female householder with no husband present, and 34.8% were non-families. 27.0% of all households were made up of individuals, and 13.7% had someone living alone who was 65 years of age or older. The average household size was 2.53 and the average family size was 3.14.

In the city, the population was spread out, with 26.8% under the age of 18, 10.8% from 18 to 24, 30.9% from 25 to 44, 17.9% from 45 to 64, and 13.6% who were 65 years of age or older. The median age was 34 years. For every 100 females, there were 101.5 males. For every 100 females age 18 and over, there were 94.5 males.

The median income for a household in the city was $33,173, and the median income for a family was $42,188. Males had a median income of $31,167 versus $20,446 for females. The per capita income for the city was $15,926. About 6.3% of families and 9.0% of the population were below the poverty line, including 8.4% of those under age 18 and 15.9% of those age 65 or over.

== Education ==
The Royalton school district operates one elementary school and one high school. As with other Minnesota school districts, Royalton schools offer open enrollment. The athletic team's moniker for the high school is the Royals with the Mascot being a Lion. Royalton offers sports through both schools and extra activities. In elementary school, there are community ed activities including playing other teams in sports.

Royalton Elementary School is located next to Holy Trinity Church and Lutheran church. Children may go to religion classes during the day when scheduled (normally Wednesdays before lunch). With approximately 3-4 teachers per grade and 22 students in each class, it is a moderately small-sized school.

Royalton offers "M.A.P." (My Afterschool Place) to children who are not picked up right away after school.

The Royalton Football Program has a history in excellence since coach Jamie Morford took over, winning approximately 78% of their games since then. The Varsity girls basketball team won the Prairie Conference Championship in 1998–99, 2017–18 and 2018–19 and the Central Minnesota Conference Championship in 2019–20.

== Notable people ==
- The DeZurik Sisters, a country-music singing act
- Jim Langer, Pro Football Hall of Fame player 1970-1981
- Christian Rosenmeier, lawyer and state senator
- Gordon Rosenmeier, lawyer and state senator; son of Christian

== Infrastructure ==
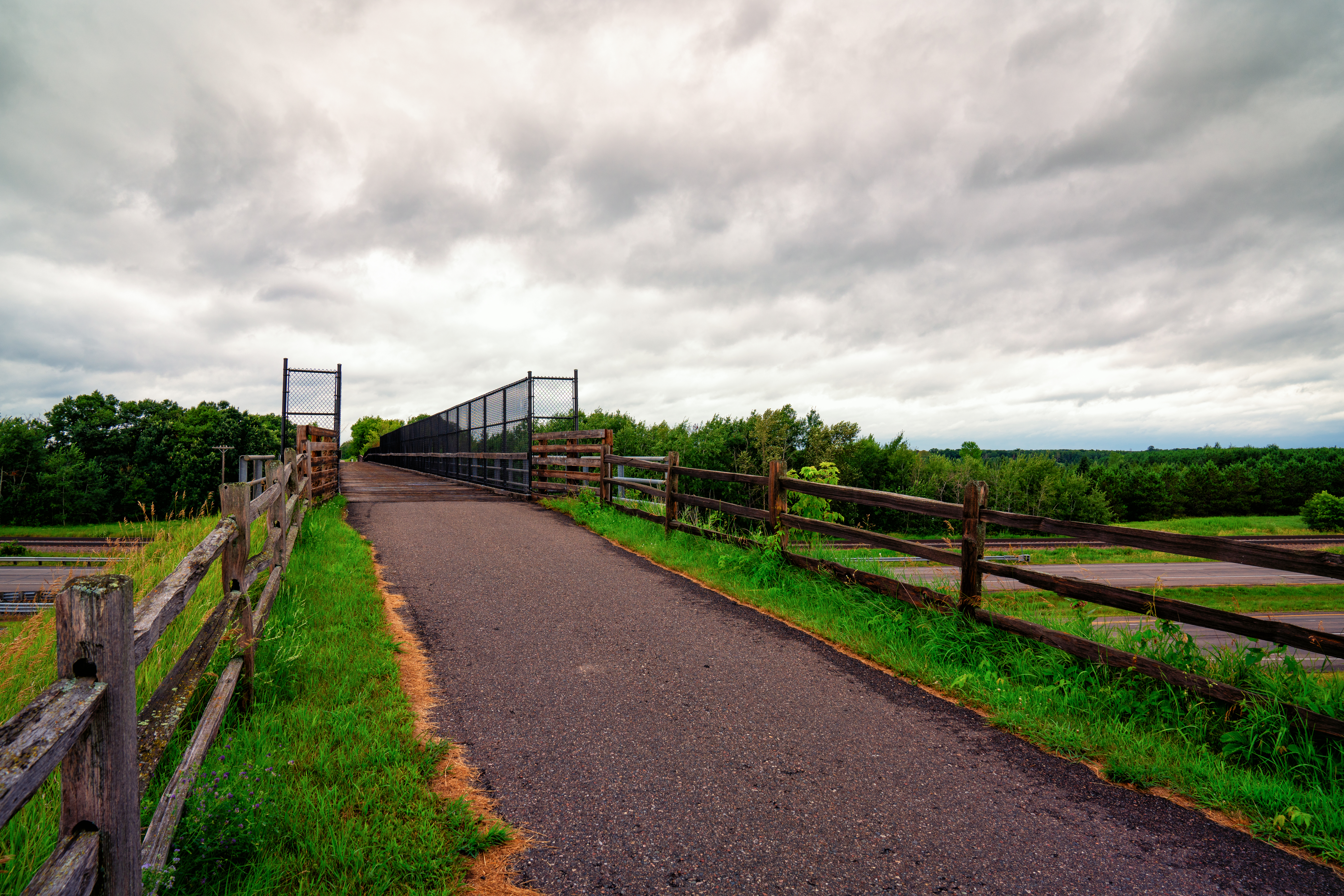
Soo Line ATV Trail

=== Transportation ===
- U.S. Highway 10

=== Rail transport ===
- Empire Builder long-distance passenger train service operated by Amtrak passes through Royalton, with the closest station at St. Cloud.

=== Energy ===
- Blanchard Dam on the Mississippi River is 4 miles (6 km) northwest of Royalton.
