= Charles A. Lindbergh State Park =

Protected area in Minnesota, United States

- Charles A. Lindbergh House and Park
- U.S. National Register of Historic Places
- U.S. National Historic Landmark
- Minnesota State Register of Historic Places
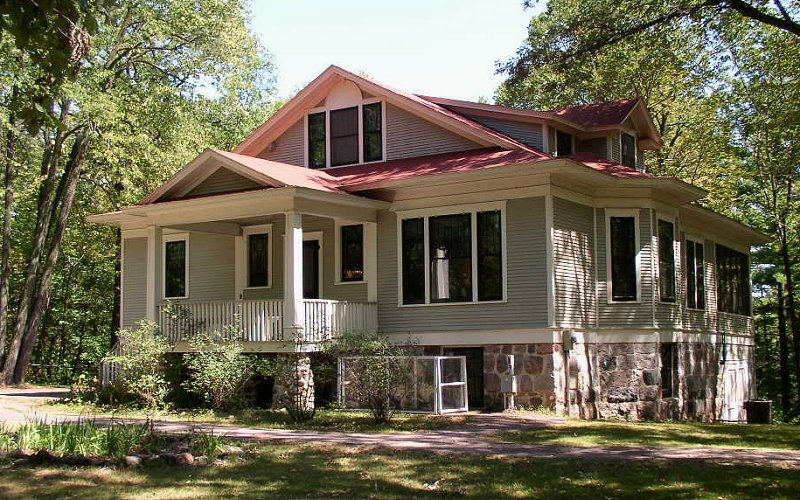
- The boyhood home of aviator Charles Lindbergh stands in the park donated in memory of his father.

- Location within Minnesota Location within the United States
- Interactive map showing the location for Lindbergh State Park
- Location: Morrison County, Minnesota, United States
- Nearest city: Little Falls, Minnesota
- Coordinates: 45°57′26.78″N 94°23′23.24″W
- Built: 1906
- Architect: Carl Bolander
- NRHP reference No.: 70000303

Significant dates
- Added to NRHP: November 20, 1970
- Designated NHL: December 8, 1976

- Charles A. Lindbergh State Park WPA/Rustic Style Historic Resources
- U.S. National Register of Historic Places
- U.S. Historic district
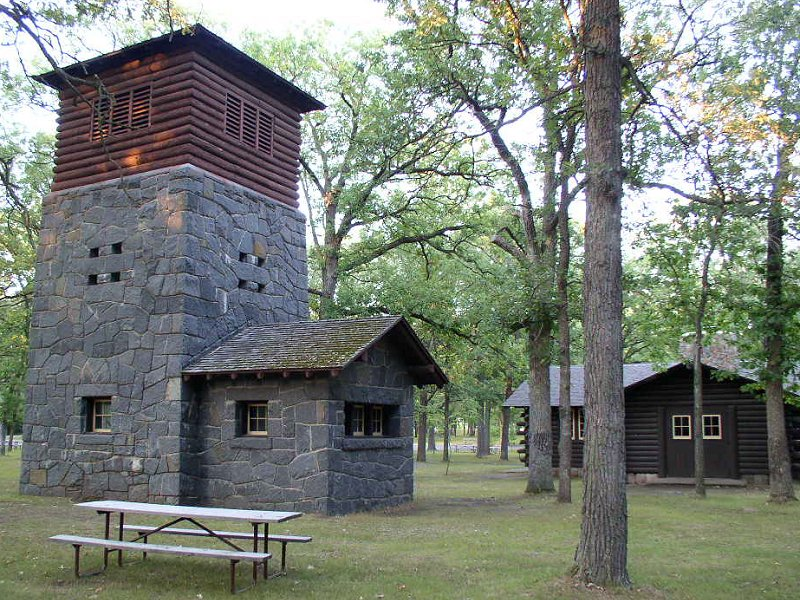
- Water tower and picnic shelter, constructed 1938
- Location: Pike Creek Township
- Coordinates: 45°57′28″N 94°23′26″W
- Area: 9 acres (3.6 ha)
- Built: 1938–39
- Architect: National Park Service, State of Minnesota, Works Progress Administration
- Architectural style: NPS Rustic
- MPS: Minnesota State Park CCC/WPA/Rustic Style MPS
- NRHP reference No.: 89001655
- Added to NRHP: 1989-10-25

Charles A. Lindbergh State Park is a 569-acre (2.3 km^{2}) Minnesota state park on the outskirts of Little Falls. The park was once the farm of Congressman Charles August Lindbergh and his son Charles Lindbergh, the famous aviator. Their restored 1906 house and two other farm buildings are within the park boundaries. The house, a National Historic Landmark, and an adjacent museum are operated by the Minnesota Historical Society, known as the Charles Lindbergh House and Museum. Three buildings and three structures built by the Works Progress Administration in the 1930s were named to the National Register of Historic Places. These buildings include a picnic shelter and a water tower, built in the Rustic Style from local stone and logs, and have remained relatively unchanged since construction. Although the property includes shoreline on the Mississippi River, the Lindbergh family requested that the park not include intensive use areas for swimming or camping, so development was kept to a minimum.

== History ==
Charles August Lindbergh, known as C.A., was a prominent lawyer and real estate trader in Little Falls. In March 1901 he married Evangeline Lodge Land, the college-educated descendant of two notable Detroit medical families, who had come to Little Falls the previous autumn as a teacher. She, C.A., and his two daughters from a previous marriage moved to a property, which C.A. had purchased for a dairy farm three years earlier. They had a three-story house built on the bluff overlooking the Mississippi River. A tenant's house was built across the road for the farm workers. Charles Augustus Lindbergh was born in 1902, and would be the couple's only child. A barn was built later that year, and the farm was populated with cattle, goats, hogs, sheep, chickens, and pigeons as well as cats and dogs.

On August 5, 1905, a fire started for unknown reasons on the third floor. The house burned down to its stone foundation, but the Lindberghs and their servants escaped injury and managed to save many of the household items. The Lindberghs had a new house built on the foundation of the first. However it was much smaller, due to C.A.'s overextended finances and a growing strain in the marriage. The new house fit awkwardly onto the footprint of the old, necessitating a short hallway with seven doors leading off. The basement, intended as a library for C.A., and the upper floor was never finished. Instead, C.A. entered politics and in 1907 began serving the first of five consecutive terms in the U.S. House of Representatives. For the next decade the younger Charles spent much of each year in Detroit and Washington, D.C., living only two or three months at the house in Little Falls. However, Charles would credit his time spent on the farm and playing along the Mississippi for his strength and self-reliance. The unfinished upper floor became Charles' exclusive play area, and upon hearing an unusually loud engine one day in 1911 he climbed out onto the roof and saw his first airplane.

Evangeline's relationship with C.A. and his daughters worsened, and in 1917 she and Charles moved back into the house year-round. Charles continued sleeping in his bedroom, which was really a screened-in porch, on all but the very coldest winter nights. He began overseeing the farm and was an early adopter of mechanization technology. Charles left in 1920 to attend college and returned only once, in 1923, arriving in his Curtiss JN-4 plane and landing in a field on the west side of the property. In the next two years the barn burned down and C.A. died, and the farm was largely neglected. After Charles Lindbergh became famous in 1927, souvenir seekers frequently broke into the empty house and caused extensive damage.

Encouraged by locals hoping to see the house protected, the Lindbergh family donated the 110-acre (0.45 km^{2}) farm to the state of Minnesota in 1931 as a park in memory of C.A. The family worked with the Minnesota Historical Society to restore the home, and donated many original furnishings. The Works Progress Administration developed the park for recreation. In 1969 the house and its grounds were transferred to the Minnesota Historical Society. In what was to be his final public address, Charles spoke from the porch of his boyhood home at the 1973 grand opening of an adjacent interpretive center. He died the following year. The visitor center initially focused on the three generations of Lindberghs in America, at the request of the spotlight-leery Charles. However, a 2002 remodeling doubled the exhibit space and added more about the aviator himself.

In 1989 the WPA developments were listed on the National Register of Historic Places as a 9-acre (3.6 ha) historic district. The district contains six contributing properties—two buildings (a picnic shelter and latrine), two structures (the water tower and a retaining wall along Pike Creek), and two objects (drinking fountains near the picnic shelter). All were built between 1938 and 1939. They are considered historically significant as examples of New Deal federal work relief and Minnesota's state park development, and architecturally significant for their National Park Service rustic design. The same picnic shelter design was used in Lake Bemidji State Park.

== Park grounds ==
The land is glacial till deposited between 100,000 and 10,000 years ago. Slate boulders carried in by glaciers from farther north are visible in the bed of Pike Creek. The vegetation remains similar to its pre-settlement composition of pine forest with oak and prairie openings. Damming has raised the water level of the Mississippi substantially from the days when Charles Lindbergh swam in it.

The park has a campground with 38 sites, 15 of those with electrical hookups. There is also a group campsite that accommodates up to 30 people, one walk-in campsite, and a canoe-in site along the Mississippi River.

== See also ==
- List of National Historic Landmarks in Minnesota
- National Register of Historic Places listings in Morrison County, Minnesota
- List of Minnesota state parks
