= Queen of Angels =

Queen of Angels or Our Lady of the Angels (Regina Angelorum) is a devotional title of Mary, mother of Jesus. It may refer to:

== Devotions ==
- Virgen de los Ángeles, first celebrated in 1635, the patron saint of Costa Rica

== Buildings and institutions ==
=== Churches ===
==== Croatia ====
- Our Lady of Angels (Gospa od Anđela), a 16th-century Franciscan monastery in Orebić

==== Costa Rica ====
- Basilica of Our Lady of the Angels, Cartago (Basílica de Nuestra Señora de los Ángeles, built 1639), a Catholic basilica

==== India ====
- Our Lady of Angels Church, Karaikal a.k.a. Karaikal Church (built 1822), a Catholic church in Pondicherry
- Our Lady of Angels Church, Puducherry (built 1855), a Catholic church in Puducherry
- Queen of Angels Church, Kadagathur (built 1932), Tamil Nadu

==== United Kingdom ====
- Our Lady of the Angels, Nuneaton (built 1838)
- Our Lady of the Angels and St Peter in Chains Church, Stoke-on-Trent (built 1857)
- Our Lady of the Angels Church, Erith (built 1963)

==== United States ====
- Our Lady Queen of Angels Church (La Iglesia de Nuestra Señora la Reina de los Ángeles), a historic Catholic church built in 1814 in Los Angeles, California
- Queen of Angels Church, Newark (1854-2016), New Jersey
- Church of Our Lady Queen of Angels (New York City) (1886-2007), New York, United States
- Our Lady of the Angels Parish (Worcester, Massachusetts) (dedicated 1928)
- Our Lady of the Angels Catholic Church (Jacksonville, Florida) (1925-2002)
- Our Lady of the Angels Monastery, Virginia (dedicated in 1989), a Trappistine monastery near Crozet, Virginia
- Our Lady of the Angels Monastery (consecrated in 1999), a Catholic monastery in Hanceville, Alabama
- Cathedral of Our Lady of the Angels a.k.a. the Los Angeles Cathedral or COLA (dedicated in 2002), a mother church in Los Angeles, California
- Our Lady Queen of Angels Catholic Church (Kula, Hawaii)
- Monastery of the Angels (Hollywood), Los Angeles, California

==== Philippines ====
- Our Lady of the Angels Parish (built 1637), Atimonan, Quezon

=== Hospitals ===
- Queen of Angels - Hollywood Presbyterian Medical Center (est. 1924), a hospital in Los Angeles, California, United States
- Queen of Angels Hospital (1926-1989), a hospital in Los Angeles, California, United States

=== Education ===
- Our Lady of the Angels School (Albuquerque, New Mexico), built 1878, in the United States
- Our Lady Queen of Angels Catholic Elementary School (New York City), est. 1892, in New York, United States
- Our Lady of the Angels School (Illinois), built 1903, a Catholic elementary school in Chicago, United States, known for a fatal fire in 1958
- Our Lady of the Angels Academy (est. 1911), a Catholic school in Belle Prairie Township, Minnesota, United States
- Our Lady Queen of Angels Seminary (OLQA, 1953-1995), a Catholic minor seminary in Los Angeles, California, United States
- Queen of Angels Academy (Compton, California) (1995-2001), a private Catholic high school for girls in the United States

=== Other ===
- Queen of Angels Foundation (est. 2011), an American association of lay faithful of the Catholic Church

== Art and entertainment ==
- Queen of the Angels (painting) (Regina Angelorum), a 1900 oil painting by French artist William-Adolphe Bouguereau, exhibited at the Petit Palais, Paris, France
- Music for Our Lady Queen of the Angels, a 1980 album by Canadian multi-instrumentalist Garth Hudson
- Queen of Angels (novel), a 1990 science fiction novel by Greg Bear

== See also ==
- Coronation of the Virgin, pre-Middle Age figurative representation of the Marian title of Queen of Angels
- St. Mary of the Angels (disambiguation)
- Basilica of Our Lady of the Angels (disambiguation)
