= Santa Maria degli Angeli =

Santa Maria degli Angeli ('St. Mary of the Angels') may refer to the following:

== Churches ==
- Papal Basilica of Saint Mary of the Angels in Assisi (Basilica di Santa Maria degli Angeli), Italy
- Santa Maria degli Angeli e dei Martiri ('Basilica of St Mary of the Angels and the Martyrs'), in Rome, Italy
- Santa Maria degli Angeli, Florence, Italy
- Sant'Angelo, Milan, officially Santa Maria degli Angeli, in Italy
- Santa Maria degli Angeli, Murano, Italy
- Santa Maria degli Angeli (Tripoli), in Libya

== Places ==
- Santa Maria degli Angeli, Assisi, a subdivision of Assisi, Italy

== See also ==
- St. Mary of the Angels (disambiguation)
- Basilica of Our Lady of the Angels (disambiguation)
