= St. Mary of the Angels =

St. Mary of the Angels may refer to:

== Australia ==
- St Mary of the Angels Basilica, Geelong

== Chile ==
- St. Mary of the Angels Cathedral (Los Ángeles, Chile)

== France ==
- Former name of the Temple du Marais in Paris

== India ==
- Franciscan Sisters of St. Mary of the Angels, administrators of St. Mary's Convent School, Ujjain

== Italy ==
- Papal Basilica of Saint Mary of the Angels in Assisi, the founding place of the Franciscan Order
- St. Mary of the Angels Monastery (Florence), a defunct formerly-famous Camaldolese abbey
- Santa Maria degli Angeli, Florence, the former church of a now-defunct monastery
- Santa Maria degli Angeli e dei Martiri, built inside the frigidarium of the Baths of Diocletian in Rome

== New Zealand ==
- St Mary of the Angels, Wellington, a church in Wellington

== Singapore ==
- Church of St Mary of the Angels, a church in Bukit Batok New Town

== United Kingdom ==
- St Mary of the Angels, Bayswater, a church in Bayswater, London, England
- St Mary of the Angels, Liverpool, England, a church in Liverpool, England
- St Mary of the Angels Roman Catholic Church, Canton, a church in Cardiff, Wales
- St Mary of the Angels, Worthing, a church in Worthing, England
- Church of St Mary of the Angels, Hooton, a church in Welsh Road, Hooton, Cheshire, England
- St Mary of the Angels Church, Brownshill, a church in Gloucestershire, England

== United States ==
- St. Mary of the Angels Church, Hollywood, California
- St. Mary of the Angels (Chicago), a historically Polish church in Chicago, Illinois
- St. Mary of the Angels Motherhouse Complex (Amherst, New York), the former motherhouse of the Franciscan Sisters of Buffalo, listed on the NRHP
- St. Mary of the Angels Home, a Catholic charity in the Roman Catholic Archdiocese of New York
- St. Mary of the Angels Church and Monastery, Green Bay, Wisconsin
- St. Mary of the Angels Basilica, Olean, New York

== See also ==
- Basilica of Our Lady of the Angels (disambiguation)
- Queen of Angels (disambiguation)
- St. Mary's Church (disambiguation): includes St. Mary's Church, St. Mary the Virgin's Church, St. Mary Church, Saint Mary Church, and other variations
- Santa Maria degli Angeli (disambiguation)
