= Basilica of St. Mary =

Basilica of St. Mary may refer to:

== Italy ==
- Basilica of Santa Maria degli Angeli, Assisi
- Basilica di Santa Maria dei Servi, Bologna
- Basilica of Santa Maria Novella, Florence
- Santa Maria di Collemaggio, L'Aquila
- Basilica di Santa Maria Maggiore, Rome
- Santa Maria Ausiliatrice, Rome
- Santa Maria degli Angeli e dei Martiri, Rome
- Santa Maria del Popolo, Rome
- Santa Maria della Scala, Rome
- Santa Maria della Vittoria, Rome
- Santa Maria in Aquiro, Rome
- Santa Maria in Ara Coeli, Rome
- Santa Maria in Campitelli, Rome
- Santa Maria in Cosmedin, Rome
- Santa Maria in Domnica, Rome
- Santa Maria in Traspontina, Rome
- Santa Maria in Trastevere, Rome
- Santa Maria in Via Lata, Rome
- Santa Maria in Via, Rome
- Santa Maria sopra Minerva, Rome
- Basilica of Our Lady Help of Christians, Turin
- Frari (Basilica di Santa Maria Gloriosa dei Frari), Venice
- Santa Maria della Salute, Venice
- Torcello Cathedral, Torcello, Venice

== Spain ==
- Santa Maria de Montserrat
- Basilica of Santa Maria, Alicante, Alicante
- Santa Maria del Mar, Barcelona, Barcelona
- Basilica of Santa Maria, Igualada, Igualada
- Santa Maria de Manresa, Manresa
- Saint Mary of Valencia Cathedral, Valencia

== U.S. ==
- St. Mary's Basilica (Phoenix), Arizona
- Basilica of Saint Mary (Minneapolis), Minnesota
- St. Mary Basilica, Natchez, Mississippi
- St. Mary of the Angels Basilica (Olean, New York)
- Basilica Shrine of St. Mary (Wilmington, North Carolina)
- Basilica of St. Mary of the Assumption (Marietta, Ohio)
- St. Mary Cathedral Basilica (Galveston, Texas)
- Basilica of St. Mary (Alexandria, Virginia)
- Basilica of Saint Mary of the Immaculate Conception (Norfolk, Virginia)

== Elsewhere ==
- St. Mary's Basilica, Halifax, Canada
- St. Mary's Basilica, Bangalore, India
- St. Mary's Cathedral Basilica, Ernakulam, India
- St. Mary's Basilica, Invercargill, New Zealand
- St. Mary's Church, Gdańsk, Poland
- St. Mary's Basilica, Kraków, Poland

== See also ==
- Basilica of Our Lady of the Angels (disambiguation)
- Cathedral of Saint Mary of the Immaculate Conception (disambiguation)
- Saint Mary's Church (disambiguation)
