= Basilica of Our Lady of the Angels =

Basilica of Our Lady or Saint Mary of the Angels may refer to:

- Papal Basilica of Saint Mary of the Angels in Assisi (Basilica di Santa Maria degli Angeli, built from 1569), the mother church of the Franciscan movement, in Italy
- Santa Maria degli Angeli e dei Martiri ('Basilica of St Mary of the Angels and the Martyrs'), a 16th-century church in Rome, Italy
- Basilica of Our Lady of the Angels, Cartago (Basílica de Nuestra Señora de los Ángeles, built 1639), a Catholic basilica in Costa Rica
- St. Mary of the Angels Basilica (Olean, New York) (first dedicated in 1860), in the United States
- St Mary of the Angels Basilica, Geelong (built 1937), in Australia
- Basilica of Our Lady of the Angels, Dąbrowa Górnicza, Poland, a Catholic basilica
- Basilica of Our Lady of the Angels, Kalwaria Zebrzydowska, Poland, a Catholic basilica

== See also ==
- Basilica of St. Mary (disambiguation)
- St. Mary of the Angels (disambiguation)
- Our Lady of the Angels (disambiguation)
