= Elizabeth Taylor Ayer =

American missionary (1803–1898)

- Born: 1803; Heath, Massachusetts
- Died: 1898 (aged 94–95); Belle Prairie, Minnesota
- Employer: American Board of Commissioners for Foreign Missions American Missionary Association
- Spouse: Frederick Ayer (missionary)

Elizabeth Taylor Ayer (1803–1898) was a missionary with the American Board of Commissioners for Foreign Missions to the Upper Midwest, including the Minnesota Territory. She was married to fellow missionary Frederick Ayer.

== Biography ==
Ayer was born Elizabeth Taylor in Heath, Massachusetts in 1803. Unmarried at twenty-five, she traveled to Mackinac Island to work at an Indian boarding school. She had been working there several year when she met Frederick Ayer.

Frederick was soon sent to Ojibwe trading posts as a missionary, setting up a school in Lyman Warren's home in La Pointe. Meanwhile, Elizabeth studied the Ojibwe language. Frederick published a small book on the Ojibwe language, and when he returned to Mackinac, he and Elizabeth married.

Elizabeth and Frederick opened a mission station on the St. Croix River, near Yellow Lake from 1833 to 1835. Then, an Ojibwe leader invited the missionaries to Pokegama Lake to start a new mission there. The site became home to a treaty-funded blacksmith and farmer working with the Ojibwe. Elizabeth had two sons at the mission post: Lyman and Frederick Jr.

In spring 1841, the post was attacked by Dakota. The Ayer family traveled to Oberlin College, where Frederick was ordained and Elizabeth studied. By late 1843, Elizabeth and Frederick returned to missionary work at the Red Lake mission. However, Frederick soon became ill.

The Ayers retired from the missionary organization and settled in Belle Prairie in the new Minnesota Territory. They began a seminary for Ojibwe youth, and Elizabeth convinced teachers she knew from New England and Illinois to relocate. The school served Ojibwe, mixed-race, and some white children. It was acquired by the Methodist Conference in 1856, but Elizabeth remained a teacher in Morrison County. She also taught at Crow Wing.

Elizabeth's son Frederick died in 1850, and the family adopted at least one Ojibwe orphan.

Her son Lyman, along with other relatives like Henry Ayer, served in the Civil War, advocating for Frederick and Elizabeth to travel to Atlanta, Georgia to provide education to freedmen. They did so, working in American Missionary Association schools.

Following her husbands death, Elizabeth returned to Belle Prairie. She continued to teach, and died in 1898.
