= Olaa =

Olaa (Olaʻa or ‘Ōla‘a) is a site name in Hawaii that may refer to:

- Olaa Forest on Mauna Loa, in the Hawaiʻi Volcanoes National Park
- Olaʻa banana hedyleptan moth
- ʻOlaʻa peppered looper moth
- ʻOlaʻa flume on Mauna Loa
- Keaʻau, a Census-designated place in Hawaii formerly known as Ola'a

The acronym OLAA may refer to:

- Our Lady of the Angels Academy (OLAA)
