= Frederick Ayer (missionary) =

American missionary involved in the creation of Atlanta University

- Born: 1803; Uxbridge, Massachusetts
- Died: 28 September 1867 (aged 63–64)
- Organization: American Missionary Association
- Spouse: Elizabeth Taylor Ayer

Frederick Ayer (1803 - 28 September 1867) was a missionary from the American Missionary Association who worked with the Ojibwe in Minnesota and Wisconsin. After the Civil War, he went to Atlanta, Georgia in 1865 to help set up schools for newly freed slaves (freedmen).

== Missionary work ==
Ayer was born in Uxbridge, Massachusetts. His father was a Presbyterian minister. At a young age, his family moved to New York State. He suffered from poor health, which forced him to abandon his plans to study for the ministry, and he instead made a living working in Utica. Around 1825, he finally made religion his profession.

Around 1829, Ayer traveled to Mackinac Island to work at the mission school there. In 1830, he traveled to La Pointe to open a school, and studied the Ojibwe language. He also opened a school at Sandy Lake. He returned to Utica, New York, to publish an Ojibwe language "spelling book". Much of his traveling was done with fur traders.

When Ayer returned from New York, he married a teacher from the Mackinac school, Elizabeth Taylor Ayer, and joined the American Missionary Association. Soon after their marriage, they went to open a new mission at Yellow Lake near the St. Croix River. The mission was moved to Lake Pokegama where the Ayers stayed for six years. They had two children.

In 1842, following conflict near his mission between the Dakota and the Ojibwe, Ayer traveled to Oberlin to raise money and awareness for his missionary cause, and was ordained. He soon returned to the Minnesota area to continue his missionary efforts. He was a leader in the founding of the Red Lake Mission. He started a school in Fort Ripley, Minnesota. Ayer also founded a mission and the first school in Morrison County, Minnesota, at Belle Prairie, where he stayed as he was in poor health.

Following the Civil War, Ayer's health improved. When Ayer arrived in Atlanta, he took over the educational work started by freedmen James Tate and Grandison B. Daniels. Tate and Daniels had started the "first school in Atlanta for African American children on the corner of Courtland and Jenkins Streets in a building owned by Bethel A.M.E. Church"; this school would eventually become Atlanta University. Ayer also organized a public school that became Summer Hill School. Ayer died on 28 September 1867.
