= Cathedral of Saint Mary of the Immaculate Conception =

Cathedral of Saint Mary of the Immaculate Conception is the name of several Catholic cathedrals. Among cathedrals that have both "St. Mary" and "Immaculate Conception" somewhere their official and common names:

== Australia ==
- St Mary's Cathedral, Perth (Cathedral of the Immaculate Conception of the Blessed Virgin Mary), seat of the Roman Catholic Diocese of Perth (Western Australia)

== Canada ==
- Cathedral of Saint Mary of the Immaculate Conception, seat of the Roman Catholic Archdiocese of Kingston (Ontario)

== Ireland ==
- St Mary's Pro-Cathedral (Pro-Cathedral of the Immaculate Conception of the Blessed Virgin Mary), episcopal seat of the Roman Catholic Archbishop of Dublin and Primate of Ireland

== United States ==
- Old Saint Mary's Cathedral in San Francisco (also known as Old St. Mary's Church in Chinatown), former seat of the Archdiocese of San Francisco (California)
- Cathedral Basilica of the Immaculate Conception in Denver (also known as St. Mary's Parish), seat of the Archdiocese of Denver (Colorado)
- Cathedral of Saint Mary of the Immaculate Conception (Peoria, Illinois), (also known as St. Mary's Cathedral), seat of the Diocese of Peoria
- Cathedral of Saint Mary of the Immaculate Conception in Indiana, seat of the Diocese of Lafayette in Indiana
- Cathedral of Saint Mary in Austin (dedicated as Saint Mary's of the Immaculate Conception), seat of the Diocese of Austin (Texas)
- Cathedral of Saint Mary of the Immaculate Conception, seat of the Archdiocese of Portland in Oregon

== See also ==
- Basilica of St. Mary (disambiguation)
- Cathedral of the Immaculate Conception (disambiguation)
- St. Mary's Cathedral (disambiguation)
