= 2015 visit by Pope Francis to North America =

Papal and state visit by Pope Francis to Cuba and the United States in 2015

Apostolic Journey to Cuba, the United States of America and the United Nations
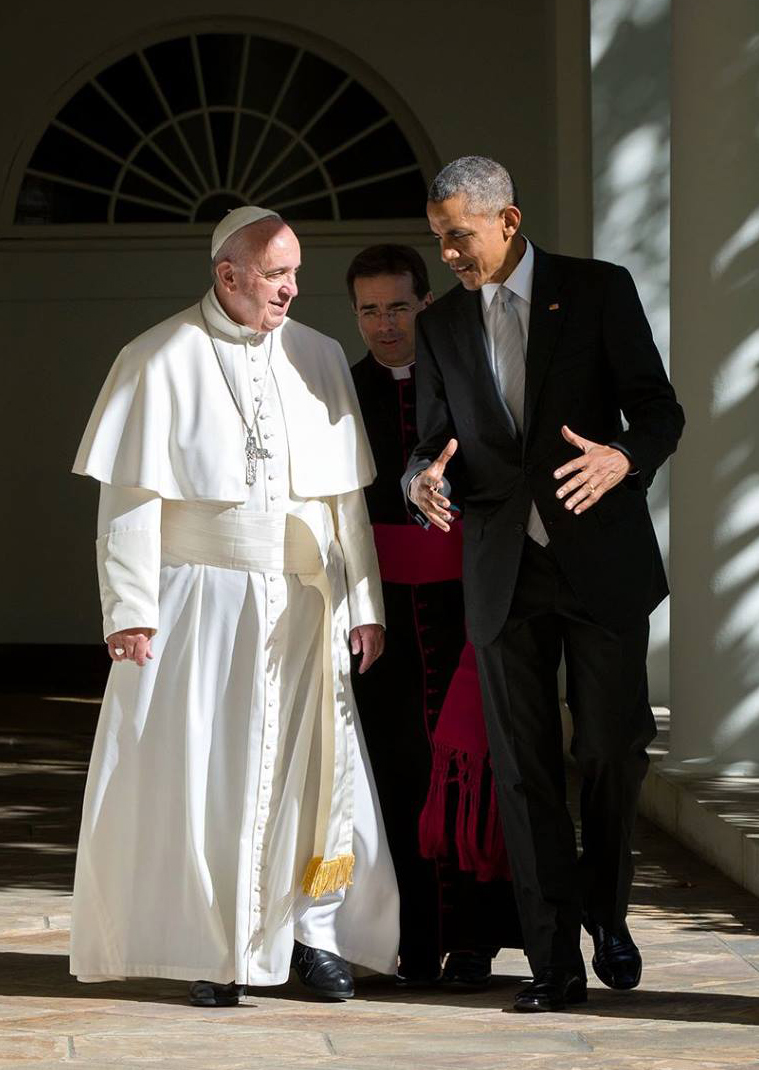
- Pope Francis and President Barack Obama walk along the East Wing Colonnade
- Date: 19–27 September 2015
- Venue: For the venues, see venues
- Location: Cuba: Havana Holguín Santiago de Cuba United States: Washington, D.C. New York City United Nations Philadelphia
- Theme: "Love Is Our Mission"
- Cause: 2015 World Meeting of Families
- Organised by: Conference of Catholic Bishops of Cuba; United States Conference of Catholic Bishops

Pope Francis visited North America—Cuba and the United States—from 19 to 27 September 2015. It was his first and only state visit to both Cuba and the U.S., as well as the third official papal visit to Cuba and the seventh to the United States since the U.S. established full diplomatic relations with the Holy See in 1984.

The published itinerary from the Vatican described the trip: "Apostolic Journey of His Holiness Pope Francis to Cuba and the United States of America, and Visit to the United Nations Organization Headquarters, on the occasion of his participation at the Eighth World Meeting of Families in Philadelphia."

== Visit ==
=== Cuba ===
The pope's visit began with a tour of Cuba – the third by a reigning Pope (after Pope John Paul II's 1998 visit, and the subsequent visit in 2012 by Pope Benedict XVI) – where he visited Havana, Holguín, and Santiago de Cuba.

==== 19 September (Havana) ====
- 10:15 a.m. – Departure from Rome to Havana
- 4:05 p.m. – Arrival Ceremony at Havana airport and speech

==== 20 September (Havana) ====
- 9:00 a.m. – Mass in Havana's Plaza de la Revolución with homily; recitation of the Angelus
- 4:00 p.m. – Courtesy visit with Raúl Castro in Plaza de la Revolución
- 5:15 p.m. – Celebration of Vespers with priests, religious, and seminarians in the Havana cathedral, with homily
- 6:30 p.m. – Greeting to young people at the Father Felix Varela cultural center in Havana

==== 21 September (Holguín, Santiago de Cuba, El Cobre) ====
- 8:00 a.m. – Departure for Holguín
- 9:20 a.m. – Arrival in Holguín
- 10:30 a.m. – Mass in Revolution Square with homily
- 3:45 p.m. – Blessing of the city from Cross Hill
- 4:40 p.m. – Departure for Santiago de Cuba
- 5:30 p.m. – Arrival at Santiago de Cuba
- 7:00 p.m. – Meeting with bishops at the seminary of St. Basil the Great in El Cobre
- 7:45 p.m. – Prayer to Our Lady of Charity with bishops and papal entourage in the Minor Basilica of the Shrine of Our Lady of Charity of El Cobre

==== 22 September (El Cobre, Santiago de Cuba) ====
- 8:00 a.m. – Mass in the Minor Basilica of the Shrine of Our Lady of Charity of El Cobre with homily
- 11:00 a.m. – Meeting with families in the Cathedral of Our Lady of Assumption in Santiago de Cuba with speech; blessing of the city
- 12:15 p.m. – Farewell ceremony at Santiago de Cuba's International Airport
- 12:30 p.m. – Departure for Washington, D.C.

=== United States ===
The visit to the United States consisted of three cities: Washington, D.C., New York City (including his visit to the United Nations), and Philadelphia which hosted the World Meeting of Families. Tickets to attend public events with the pope were hard to obtain or sold out very quickly.

During his visit, it was announced that he would be releasing a rock album titled Wake Up! in November 2015.

==== 22 September (Washington, D.C.) ====
- 4:00 p.m. – Arrival from Cuba at Joint Base Andrews in Maryland, outside Washington, D.C.

==== 23 September (Washington, D.C.) ====
- 9:15 a.m. – The White House – welcome ceremony and meeting with President Barack Obama. The pope spoke to a crowd of more than 11,000 people on the White House South Lawn. It was the third visit by a pope to the White House, following meetings in October 1979 between Jimmy Carter and Pope John Paul II and in April 2008 between George W. Bush and Pope Benedict XVI.
- 11:30 a.m. – Cathedral of St. Matthew the Apostle – Midday Prayer with the bishops of the United States
- 4:15 p.m. – Basilica of the National Shrine of the Immaculate Conception – Mass for the canonization of Junípero Serra

Pope Francis met with Little Sisters of the Poor after Mass; a Vatican spokesman stated that this was a sign of his support for them in their opposition to a contraception mandate for Catholic hospitals.

==== 24 September (Washington, D.C.; New York City) ====
Speaker Boehner introduces Pope Francis to the 114th U.S. Congress, Supreme Court, and Executive Officers

- 9:20 a.m. – United States Capitol Building – Pope Francis became the first pope to address a joint session of the United States Congress, at the invitation of House Speaker John Boehner and Minority Leader Nancy Pelosi, both Catholics.

In his speech to Congress and other dignitaries, he devoted most of the time discussing immigration, protection for persecuted religious groups including Christians, poverty, capital punishment, and climate change.

- 11:15 a.m. – St. Patrick's Church in the city and Catholic Charities of the Archdiocese of Washington visit
- 4:00 p.m. – Departure from Joint Base Andrews
- 5:00 p.m. – Arrival at John F. Kennedy International Airport, New York
- 6:45 p.m. – St. Patrick's Cathedral in Manhattan – Evening Prayer/Vespers

Kim Davis and her husband met briefly with Pope Francis at the Apostolic Nunciature in Washington (Embassy of the Holy See) with "several dozen" other people. The Vatican issued a statement saying the Pope's meeting with Davis "should not be considered a form of support of her position in all of its particular and complex aspects." According to Father Thomas Rosica, a Vatican spokesman, Davis was not invited to the nunciature, and "the meeting may have been manipulated by her and her lawyer."

==== 25 September (New York City, United Nations) ====
- 8:30 a.m. – United Nations Headquarters – address to the United Nations General Assembly
- 11:30 a.m. – National September 11 Memorial & Museum and World Trade Center – multi-religious service
- 4:00 p.m. – Our Lady Queen of Angels Elementary School, East Harlem – visit
- 4:45 – 5:15 p.m. – Papal Procession through Central Park
- 6:00 p.m. – Madison Square Garden – Mass

==== 26 September (New York City, Philadelphia) ====
- 8:40 a.m. – John F. Kennedy International Airport departure
- 9:30 a.m. – Philadelphia International Airport arrival, Atlantic Aviation hangar
- 10:30 a.m. – Cathedral Basilica of Saints Peter and Paul Mass
- 4:45 p.m. – Independence Mall visit
- 7:30 p.m. – Festival of Families at Benjamin Franklin Parkway visit

==== 27 September (Philadelphia) ====
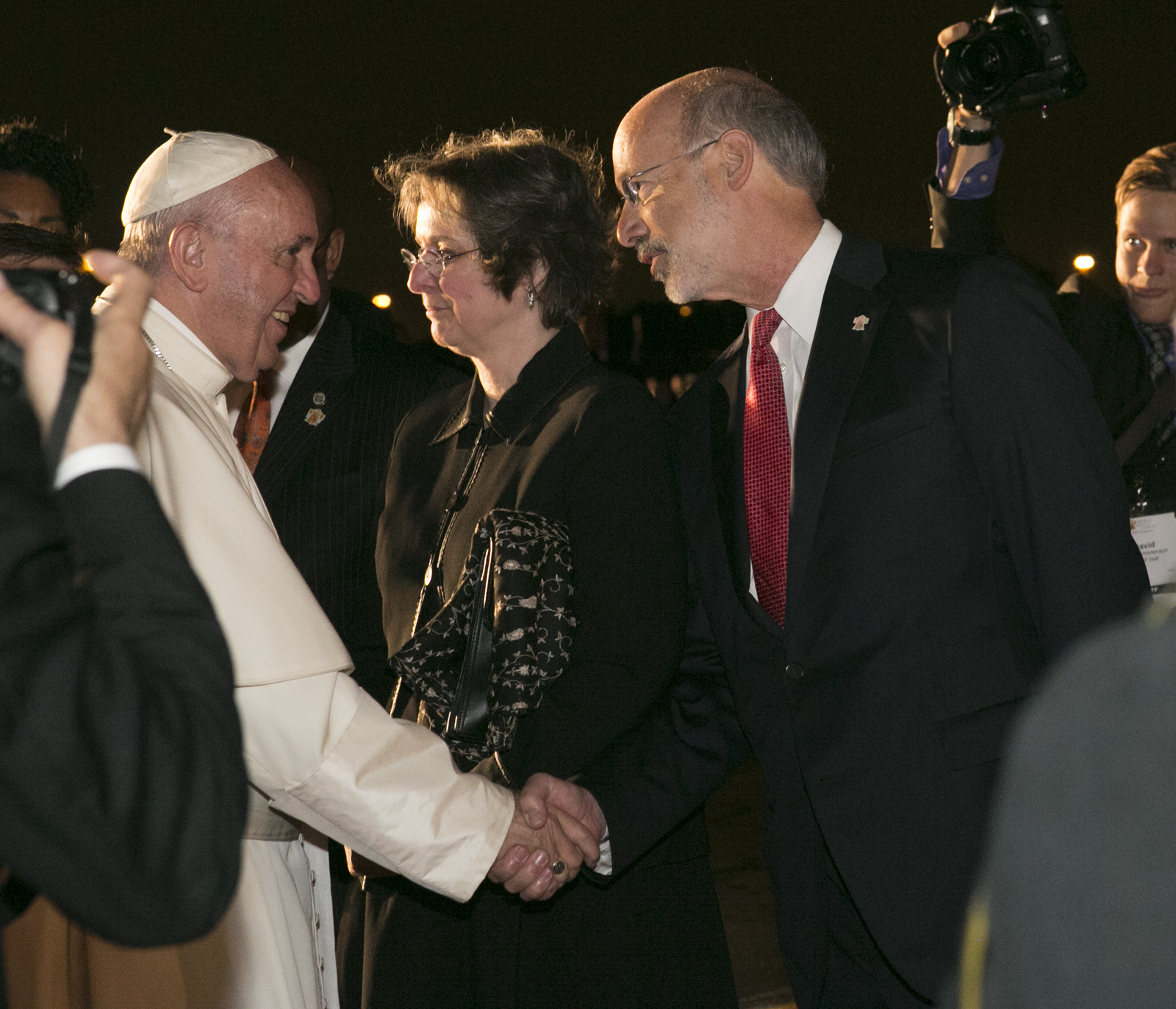
Francis with Pennsylvania governor Tom Wolf and First Lady Frances Wolf while in Philadelphia

- 9:15 a.m. – St. Martin's Chapel, St. Charles Borromeo Seminary in Wynnewood, Pennsylvania: meeting with bishops
- 11:00 a.m. – Visit Curran-Fromhold Correctional Facility in Holmesburg, Philadelphia
- 3:00 p.m. – Visit and blessing at the Jesuit Saint Joseph's University
- 4:00 p.m. – World Meeting of Families, Benjamin Franklin Parkway – Mass
- 7:00 p.m. – Atlantic Aviation hangar: visit with organizers, volunteers, and benefactors
- 7:30 p.m. – Departure from Philadelphia International Airport for Rome

== Commemorations ==
Philadelphia breweries released nine special, papal-themed beers in anticipation of the visit. The Delaware County Keystone Mint crafted a coin commemorating the pope's visit to the United States and the World Meeting of Families. Two Philadelphia radio stations introduced "pop-up stations" dedicated to extended coverage of the visit and its associated events, including WZMP-HD3's "Popecast", and WDAS's "Pope Info Radio".

Swyft Media released a sticker keyboard app to commemorate the visit, Popemoji, which featured cartoon images of Pope Francis for use in messaging apps (including nods to U.S. landmarks and Philadelphia).

== See also ==
- Catholic Church in the United States
- Jesuits in the United States
- List of pastoral visits of Pope Francis outside Italy
