= Portiuncula =

Catholic chapel near Assisi, Umbria, Italy

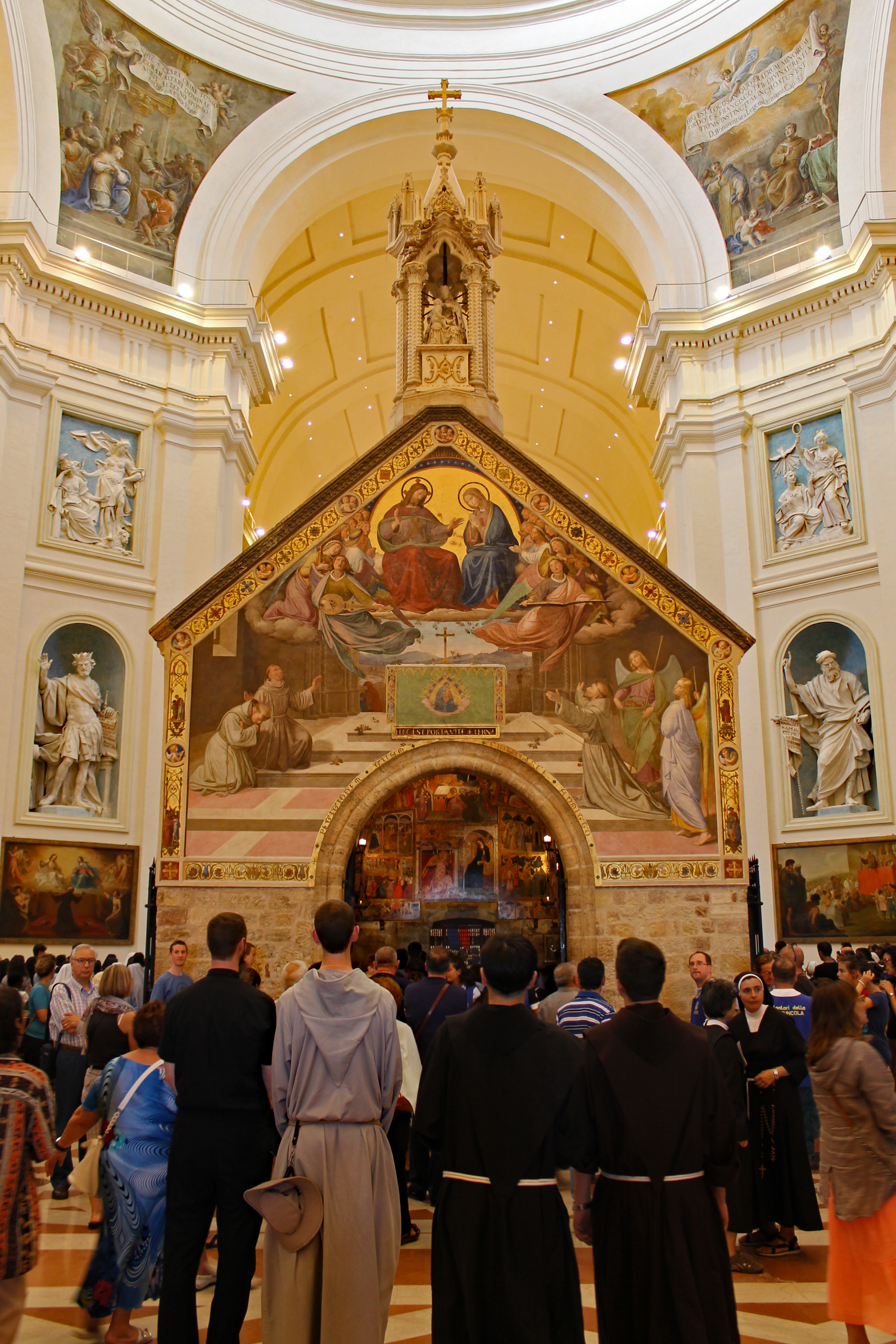
Vigil at the Portiuncula on the eve of the Feast of the Pardon (August, 2013)

The Portiuncula (Italian: Porziuncola) is a historic chapel in the town of Santa Maria degli Angeli, near Assisi, Italy. It is closely associated with Francis of Assisi and the Order of Friars Minor, who used the chapel as their headquarters. Following Francis's death in 1226, it became an important pilgrimage site. In the 16th century, a vast basilica, the Basilica of St Mary of the Angels, was built around the Portiuncula.

== History ==
According to a legend, whose existence can be traced back with certainty only to 1645, the little chapel of Portiuncula was erected under Pope Liberius (352–366) by hermits from the Valley of Josaphat, who had brought relics from the grave of the Virgin Mary. The same legend says that the chapel passed into the possession of Benedict of Nursia in 516. It was known as Our Lady of the Valley of Josaphat or of the Angels – the latter title referring, according to some, to the assumption of Mary accompanied by angels; a better-founded opinion attributes the name to a legend attesting to the singing of angels which had been frequently heard there.

The chapel was located on a small portion of land ("Portiuncula") belonging to the Order of Saint Benedict of Monte Subasio. Later, the name of the land passed to the little church itself. It was in bad condition, lying abandoned in a wood of oak trees.

After a pilgrimage to Rome, where he begged at the church doors for the poor, Francis said he had had a mystical vision of Jesus Christ in the wayside chapel of San Damiano, about two miles outside of Assisi, in which the Icon of Christ Crucified came alive and said to him three times, "Francis, Francis, go and repair My house which, as you can see, is falling into ruins". Francis took this literally to mean the ruined church in which he was presently praying, and so sold his horse and some cloth from his father's store, to assist the priest there for this purpose. His father Pietro, highly indignant, sought restitution. After a final interview in the presence of the bishop, Francis renounced his father and his patrimony, laying aside even the garments he had received from him. For the next couple of months he lived as a beggar in the region of Assisi. Returning to the town for two years this time, he restored several ruined churches, among them the Portiuncula, little chapel of St Mary of the Angels, just outside the town.

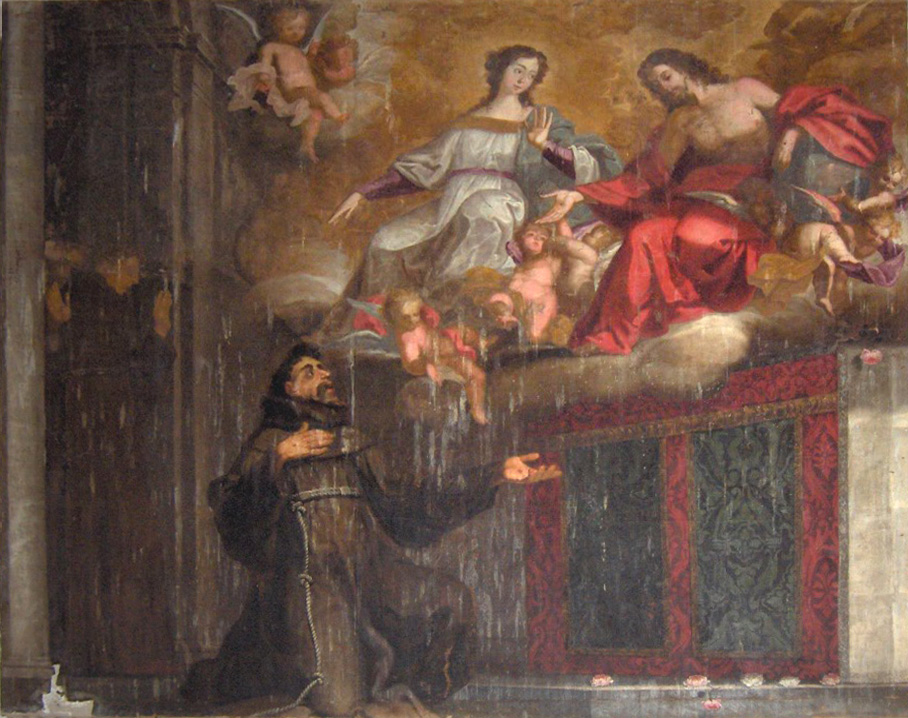
The miracle of the Portiuncula; painting by Antonio de Oliveira Bernardes (1698); Cathedral of Évora, Portugal.

Francis built himself a small hut near the Chapel of Our Lady of the Angels and was soon joined by others. Here he founded the Franciscans. Around 1211 the small chapel was given to Francis by the abbot of Saint Benedict of Monte Subasio on condition of making it the mother house of his religious family. On Palm Sunday 1211 St Francis received in this church Clare of Assisi and founded the Second Order of the Poor Ladies Poor Clares. Adjoining this humble sanctuary, already dear to Francis, the first Franciscan convent was formed by the erection of a few small huts or cells of wattle, straw, and mud, and enclosed by a hedge.

The General Chapters, the annual meetings of the friars, were held in this church usually during Pentecost (months of May – June).

Feeling his end approaching, St Francis asked to be brought back to the Portiuncula in September 1226. On his death-bed St Francis recommended the chapel to the faithful protection and care of his brethren. He died, in his cell, not fifteen yards from the church, at sunset on Saturday, 3 October 1226.

However this may be, here or in this neighbourhood was the cradle of the Franciscan Order. After the death of Francis, the spiritual value and the charisma of the Portiuncula became even greater. St Francis himself pointed out the Portiuncula as a primary source of inspiration and a model for all his followers.

== Later developments ==
Shortly after 1290, the chapel, which measured only about 5.5 by 3.2 m, became entirely inadequate to accommodate the throngs of pilgrims. The altar piece, an Annunciation, was painted by the priest Hilarius of Viterbo in 1393. The monastery was at most the residence, only for a short time, of the ministers-general of the order after St Francis. In 1415 it first became associated with the Regular Observance, in the care of which it remains to the present day.

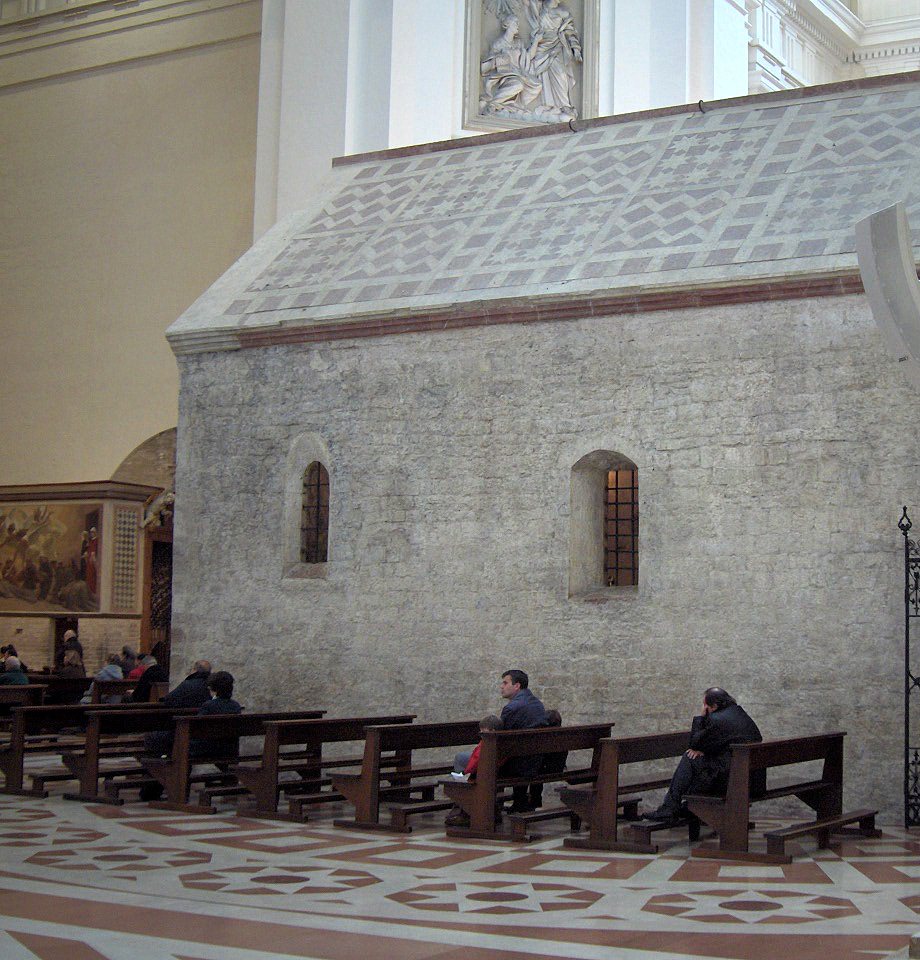
Side view of the Portiuncula.

== Decorations of the Portiuncula ==
This tiny church is exquisitely decorated by artists from different periods. On the façade, above the entrance outside, is a fresco by Johann Friedrich Overbeck (1829), depicting St Francis receiving from Christ and the Virgin the indulgence, known as the "Pardon of Assisi". The German painter Overbeck was a member of the Nazarene movement, a group of painters who aimed to revive honesty and spirituality in Christian art. At the base of this fresco is a small rectangular fresco beneath which are the Latin words Haec est porta vitae aeternae ("This is the gate to eternal life").

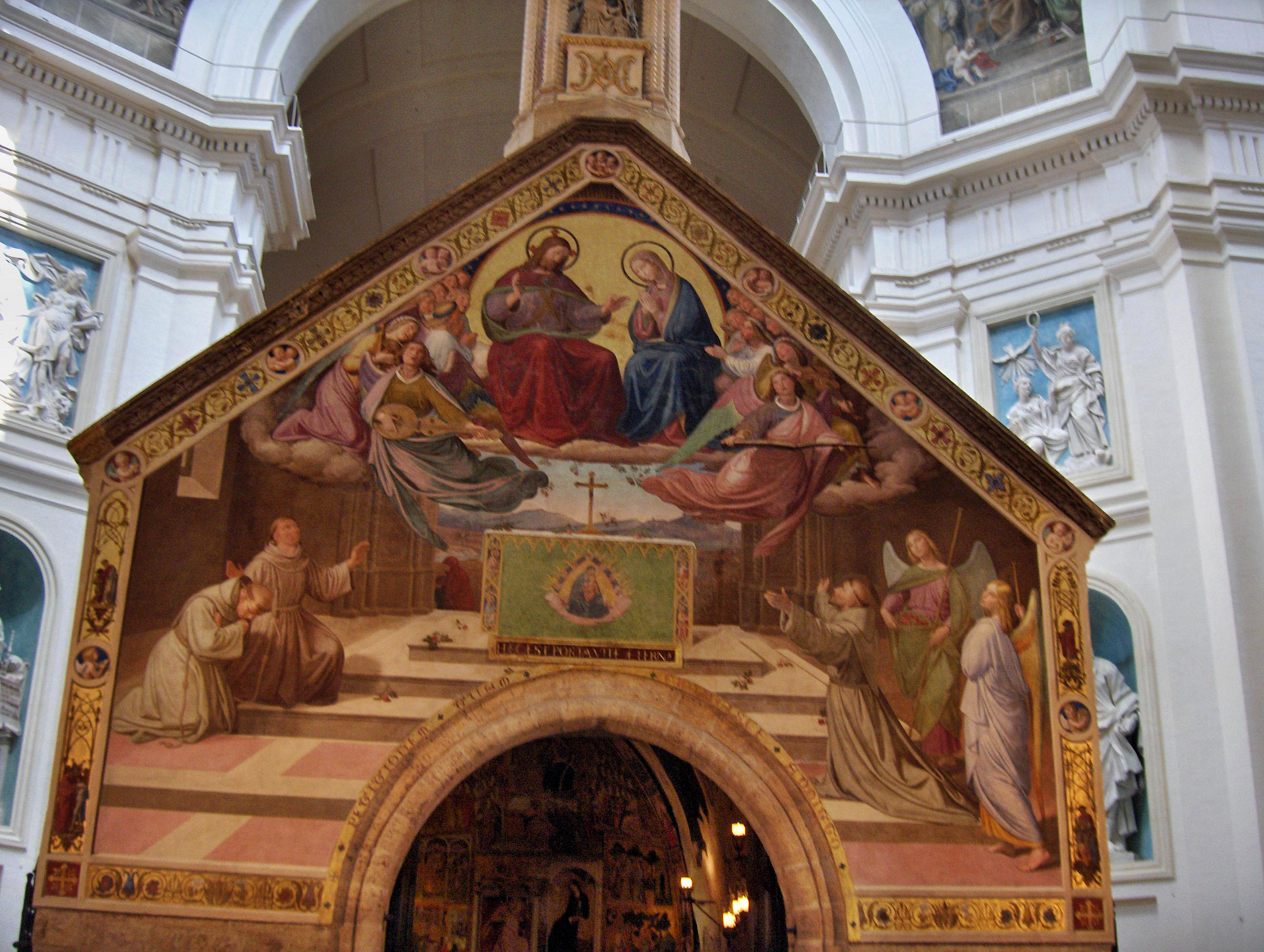
Fresco by Friedrich Overbeck St Francis receiving the Pardon of Assisi over the entrance of the Portiuncula

The outside wall to the right of the entrance shows fragments of two frescoes by unknown Umbrian artists. In the 19th century a door was opened in the same wall, to control the flow of pilgrims. The left outside wall includes the tombstone of Pietro Cattani, who died on 10 March 1221. (St Francis was still alive at the time of his death). At the back, above the entrance, is the fresco Crucifixion by Perugino, painted around 1485. It was badly damaged during the construction of the basilica. The 15th century door is decorated with floral motifs. On top of the Portiuncula stands a small Gothic belfry.

The interior is austere and simple. Some of the rough, squared stones, taken from Mount Subasio, were put in place by the saint himself while repairing this little church. It is decorated in a simple Gothic style with frescoes from the 14th and the 15th century. But the masterpiece is the six-part fresco in the apse of this little church, painted by the priest Ilario da Viterbo (1393):

- The Annunciation (middle)
- St Francis Throws Himself into the Thorny Brambles (right)
- St Francis Accompanied by Two Angels (right)
- Apparition of Christ and the Virgin, Accompanied by 60 Angels, with St Francis Offering Roses (top)
- St Francis imploring pope Honorius III the Confirmation of the Indulgence (left)
- St Francis Promulgates the Indulgence, Accompanied by the Bishops of Umbria (left)

The pavement on the floor is now restored to its original appearance by the restorations following the earthquake of 1997.

== Basilica of Santa Maria degli Angeli ==
The buildings which had been gradually added to the shrine were taken down by order of Pope Pius V (1566–1572), except the cell in which St Francis had died, and were replaced by a large basilica in contemporary style. The new edifice was erected over the cell just mentioned and over the Portiuncula chapel, which is situated immediately under the cupola. The basilica, which has three naves and a circle of chapels extending along the entire length of the aisles, was completed (1569–78) according to the plans of Giacomo Barozzi da Vignola, assisted by Galeazzo Alessi.

In the night of 15 March 1832, the arch of the three naves and of the choir fell in, in consequence of an earthquake, the cupola sporting a big crack. Gregory XVI had all restored in 1836-1840, and on 8 September 1840 the basilica was reconsecrated by Cardinal Lambruschini. By Brief of 11 April 1909, Pope Pius X raised it to a "patriarchal basilica and papal chapel". The high altar was therefore immediately rebuilt at the expense of the Franciscan province of the Holy Cross (also known as the Saxon province), and a papal throne added. Under the bay of the choir, resting against the columns of the cupola, is still preserved the cell in which St Francis died, while, a little behind the sacristy, is the spot where the saint, during a temptation, is said to have rolled in a briar-bush, which was then changed into thornless roses. During this same night the saint received the Portiuncula Indulgence.

== Feast Day and Portiuncula Indulgence ==
Franciscans continue to celebrate the feast of Our Lady of the Angels of the Porzioncula on August 2, which marks the dedication of the church.

The Portiuncula Indulgence could at first be gained only in the Portiuncula chapel between the afternoon of 1 August and sunset on 2 August. On 5 August 1480 (or 1481), Pope Sixtus IV extended it to all churches of the first and second orders of St Francis for Franciscans. On 4 July 1622, Gregory XV extended the privilege to all the faithful, who, after confession and the reception of Holy Communion, visited such churches on the appointed day. On 12 October 1622, Gregory XV granted the same privilege to all the churches of the Capuchins. Pope Urban VIII granted it for all churches of the regular Third Order on 13 January 1643, and Clement X for all churches of the Conventuals on 3 October 1670.

While papal declarations made the Portiuncula Indulgence indisputable from the juridico-canonistic standpoint, its historical authenticity (i.e. origin from St Francis) remains in question. None of the old legends of St Francis mentions the Indulgence, nor does any contemporary document mention it. The oldest document mentioning the Indulgence is a notary's deed of 31 October 1277, in which Blessed Benedict of Arezzo (whom St Francis himself received into the order) testifies that he had been informed by Brother Masseo (a companion of St Francis) that Pope Honorius III granted the indulgence at Perugia. Later testimonies include those of Jacob Cappoli concerning Brother Leo, of Oddo of Acquasparta, Peter Zalfani, Peter John Olivi (who wrote a scholastic tract defending this indulgence about 1279), John of Laverna, Ubertino da Casale, and Francis of Fabriano (whose testimony goes back to the year 1268).

Later popes extended the privilege to all churches pertaining in any way to the Franciscan Order, even to churches in which the Third Order held its meetings (even parish churches, etc.), provided that there was no Franciscan church in the district, and that such a church was distant over an Italian mile (1000 paces). Even districts and countries could receive special privileges.

Pope Paul VI completely reformed the grants of indulgences, after the Second Vatican Council. His Apostolic Constitution Indulgentiarum Doctrina (1967) yet again confirmed the Portiuncula Indulgence. According to the Enchiridion Indulgentiarum, Catholic faithful may gain a plenary indulgence on 2 August (the Portiuncula) or on such other day as designated by the local ordinary for the advantage of the faithful, under the usual conditions (sacramental Confession, Holy Communion, and prayer for the intentions of the Supreme Pontiff), by devoutly visiting the parish church, and there reciting at least the Lord's Prayer and the Creed. The Indulgence applies to the cathedral church of the diocese, and to the co-cathedral church (if there is one), even if they are not parochial, and also to quasi-parochial churches. To gain this, as any plenary indulgence, the faithful must be free from any attachment to sin, even venial sin. Where this entire detachment is wanting, the indulgence is partial.

== Portiuncula in the United States ==
In San Francisco, California, there is a replica of the Portiuncula Chapel. The Archdiocese of San Francisco built a 78% scale copy of the original chapel in a former gymnasium adjoining the Church of the National Shrine of St. Francis of Assisi in the city's North Beach District. It opened in September 2008, and in 2010 was placed under the care of the Capuchin Franciscan friars of the Western American Province.

Other replicas exist within the United States of America including:

- Cardinal Cushing School, Hanover, Massachusetts.
- Franciscan University of Steubenville, replica built in 1987.
- Mayslake Peabody Estate in Oak Brook, Illinois.
- Mount St Sepulchre Franciscan Monastery in Washington, DC.
- Built by the Assumption BVM Province of Franciscan Friars in Burlington, Wisconsin, in 1940.
- Lourdes University in Sylvania, Ohio.

In addition, the city of Los Angeles was (indirectly) named for it: "El Pueblo de Nuestra Señora la Reina de los Ángeles del Río de Porciúncula". See Los Angeles River § Alta California for background.
