= Our Lady Queen of Angels Catholic Elementary School (New York City) =

Coordinates: 40.794961°N 73.940465°W

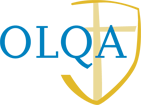
Our Lady Queen of Angels Catholic Elementary School logo

Our Lady Queen of Angels Catholic Elementary School, commonly referred to as Queen of Angels School, is a Catholic elementary school in East Harlem, Manhattan, New York City. The school was founded as a parochial school by the Capuchin Franciscans in 1892 and was originally staffed by the Sisters of St. Agnes. On 25 September 2015, Pope Francis visited Queen of Angels School as part of his New York stop in his papal visit to Cuba and the United States.

== History ==
The School was founded in 1892 to serve the children of parishioners of the Church of Our Lady Queen of Angels, a parish run by Capuchin Friars, in East Harlem, New York City. The Sisters of St. Agnes served as teachers. In 1921, the school had 13 faculty and staff, all of them religious sisters from the congregation of Sisters of St. Agnes. An additional Capuchin friar served as rector. There were 954 students total, 473 boys and 481 girls.

The parish church was closed with 21 others by the archdiocese in 2007, but the school remained open as an independent entity. As of 2015, the school had 18 faculty and staff, all laypeople. There were 295 students, 70% of whom are Hispanic and 22% of whom are African-American. There is a minority of mixed cultures, like Asians and Europeans. On September 24, 2015, Pope Francis visited Queen of Angels School as part of his New York stop in his papal visit to Cuba and the United States. The school was administered by the Partnership for Inner-City Education in conjunction with the Archdiocese of New York. from 2013 to 2024.
