= Our Lady of the Angels Catholic Church (Jacksonville, Florida) =

Coordinates: 30.32286°N 81.69759°W

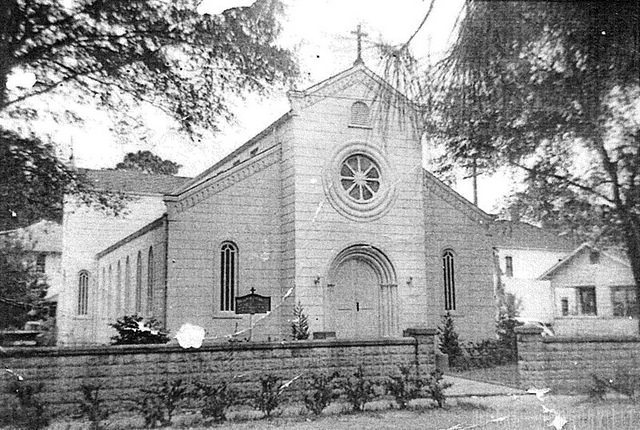
- Our Lady of the Angels Catholic Church
- Denomination: Roman Catholic

History
- Status: closed
- Founded: 1915
- Founder: Augustinian Friars
- Dedicated: 1917

Architecture
- Architectural type: Late Gothic Revival
- Years built: 1915-1917
- Closed: 2002

Specifications
- Length: 300 ft.
- Width: 215 ft.

Administration
- Diocese: Diocese of St. Augustine

Clergy
- Pastor: Fr. Joseph Notarpole

Our Lady of the Angels Catholic Church was a Roman Catholic parish located in the Lackawanna neighborhood of Jacksonville, Florida. The church was built in 1915 and closed in 2002. It remained abandoned for a few years, until being renovated to serve as a community center and now an event venue renamed as Riverside North.

== History ==
Construction of the Our Lady of the Angels Catholic Church began in 1915 on donated property to serve the growing Catholic population in Jacksonville. It was founded by the Augustinian Fathers. Upon its completion in 1917, it was dedicated by Bishop Michael J. Curley and became an independent parish. The church had wood shingle siding, built in the Late Gothic Revival style, and was 300 feet by 215 on about one and a half acres. The bishop assigned Fr. William Barry as the church's first pastor.

The following is a quote from the Jacksonville Historical Commission from an unknown member of the parish, possibly the pastor, and thought to be written during the 1960s, during the beginning of the parish's decline:

"The Parish Church with Rectory and small Hall (converted house) are located at the corner of Edison Avenue and Crystal Street on a piece of property donated by the Clark family, formerly of the Parish, about 300' by 215' or approximately 1.5 acres. There are only about five or six families who live within blocks, in fact miles, of the church which is in the most deteriorated and unsafe part of the Parish. There are a few blacks in the vicinity who come occasionally but attend mostly St. Pius church, for the blacks, run by Josephine Fathers. We have in the past two or three years had several incidents on the property itself in the way of shooting, mugging, stealing and damaging of property as well as considerable harassment [sic] by unfriendly neighbors, many of them on the mug lists. We have had to curtail practically all night activity and pay a policeman one night for Bingo which has been poorly attended of late and may have to be dropped though it has been a source of steady income to the Parish. We have no liturgical functions here at night for no one would dare attend. We ourselves are in constant danger."

During the latter half of the 20th century, the area declined economically, crime increased, and parish membership began to decrease accordingly.

The Augustinians left the parish in 1977, and the Diocese of St. Augustine took over. The church's last pastor was Fr. Joseph Notarpole, appointed in 1979, a Jungian psychologist and diocesan priest who split his time between pastoral duties and counseling.

In 2002, the church shut its doors permanently, a result of declining membership.

In 2006, North Riverside Community Development Corporation purchased the property and through a collaborative project with City of Jacksonville began work on renovating the church building for use as a neighborhood community center.

In 2014, Clara White Mission began managing the property and renamed it Riverside North. An event venue to host weddings, memorial services, and events. All rentals benefit the Clara White Mission.
