= Santa Maria degli Angeli, Assisi =

Santa Maria degli Angeli
- Frazione
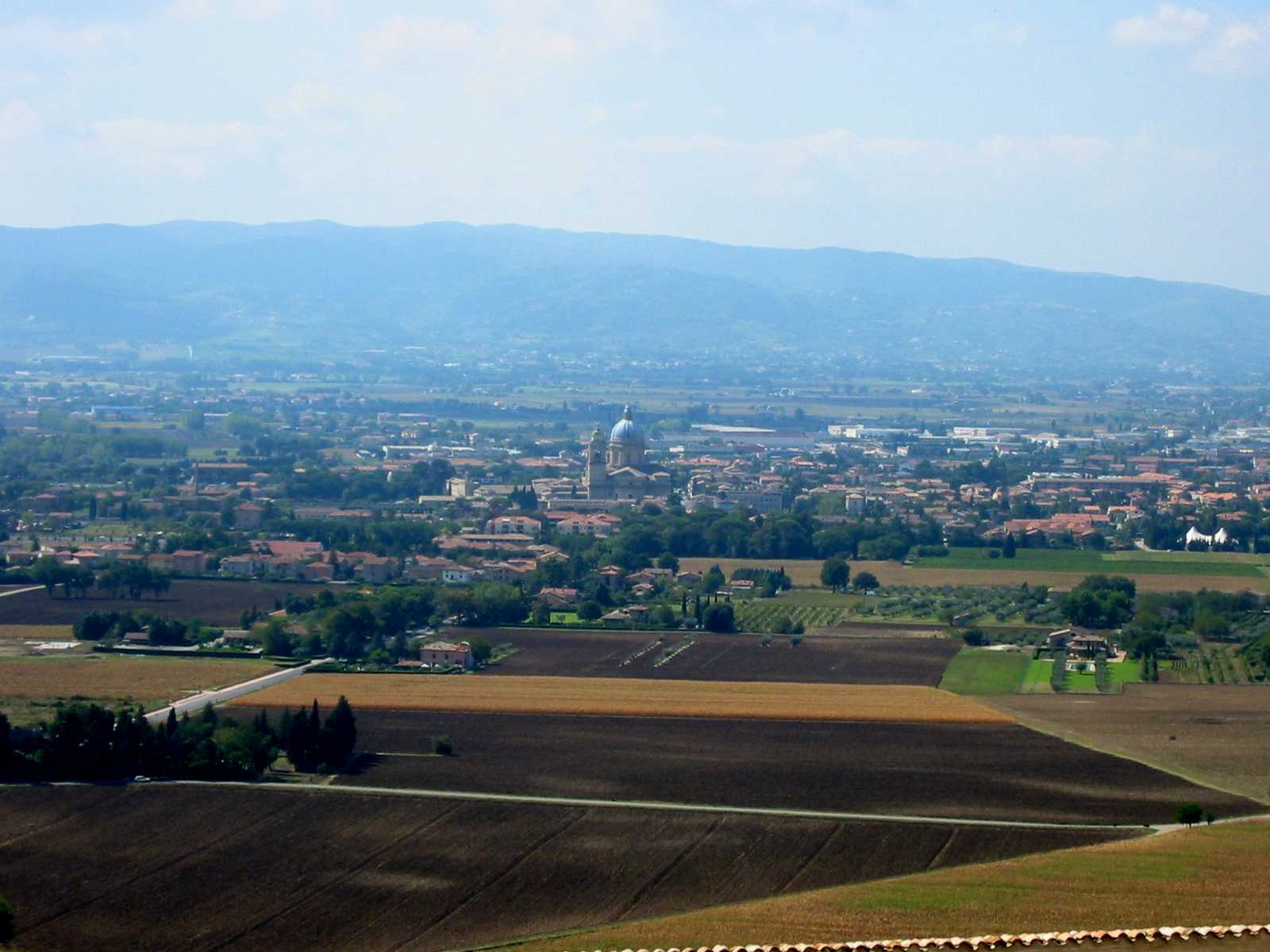
- Santa Maria degli Angeli

- Location within Italy
- Coordinates: 43°03′32″N 12°34′41″E
- Country: Italy
- Region: Umbria
- Province: Perugia
- Comune: Assisi
- Elevation: 218 m (715 ft)

Population (2001)
  - Total: 6,665
- Demonym: Angelani
- Time zone: UTC+1 (CET)
  - Summer (DST): UTC+2 (CEST)
- Postcode: 06081
- Area code: 075

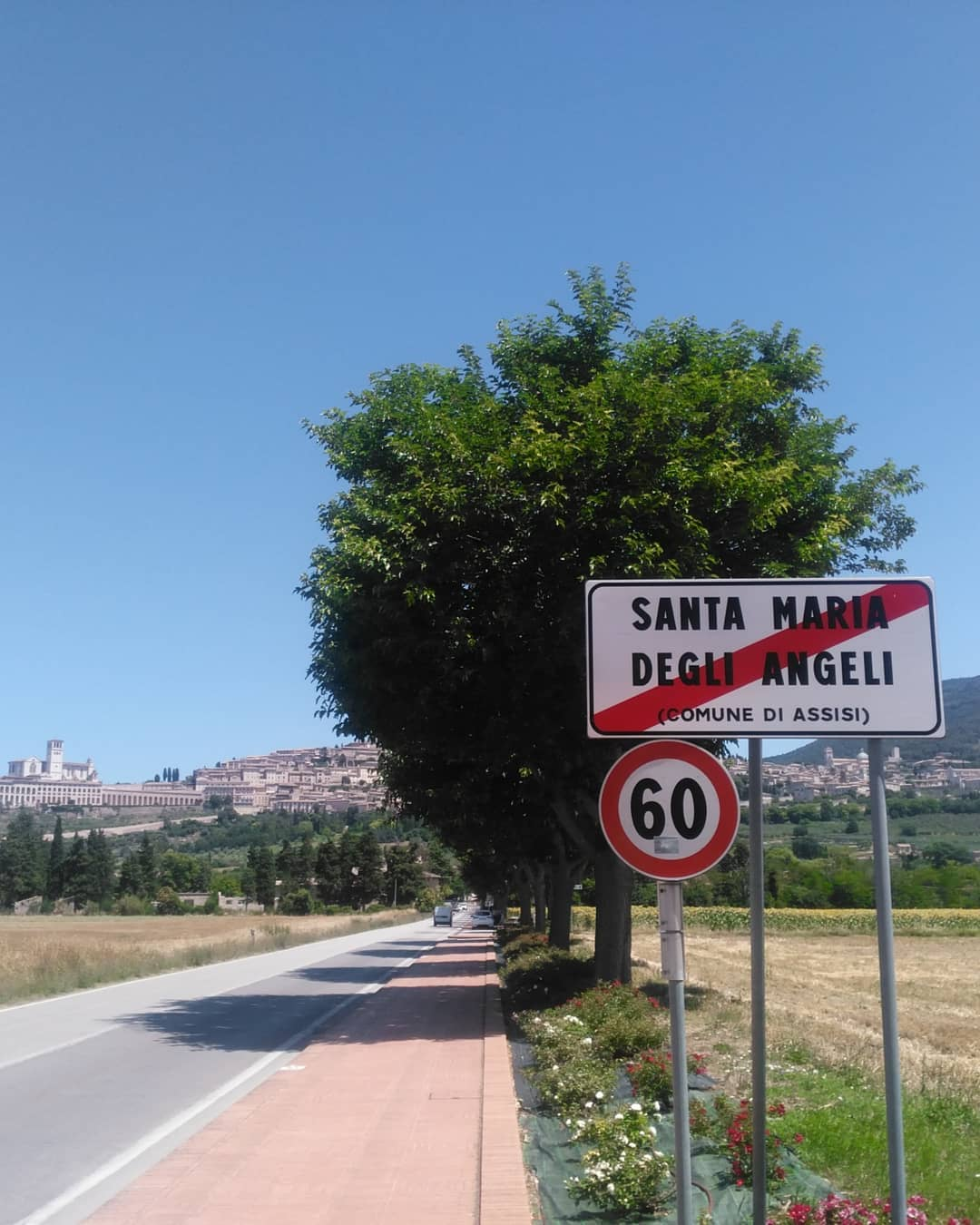
Pedestrian road towards the Assisi.

Santa Maria degli Angeli is a frazione of the comune of Assisi in the Province of Perugia, Umbria, central Italy. It stands at an elevation of 218 metres above sea level. At the time of the Istat census of 2001 it had 6,665 inhabitants, and is located c. 4 km south from Assisi. The name of the city was used by the Spanish Franciscan missionaries as the name of Los Angeles, currently one of the largest cities of the United States.

It is home to the Basilica of Santa Maria degli Angeli, which includes the Porziuncola, the most sacred place of the various Franciscan Orders. Saint Francis of Assisi himself died here.
