= St. Mary of the Angels Basilica (Olean, New York) =

Basilica in Olean New York

Basilica of St. Mary of the Angels
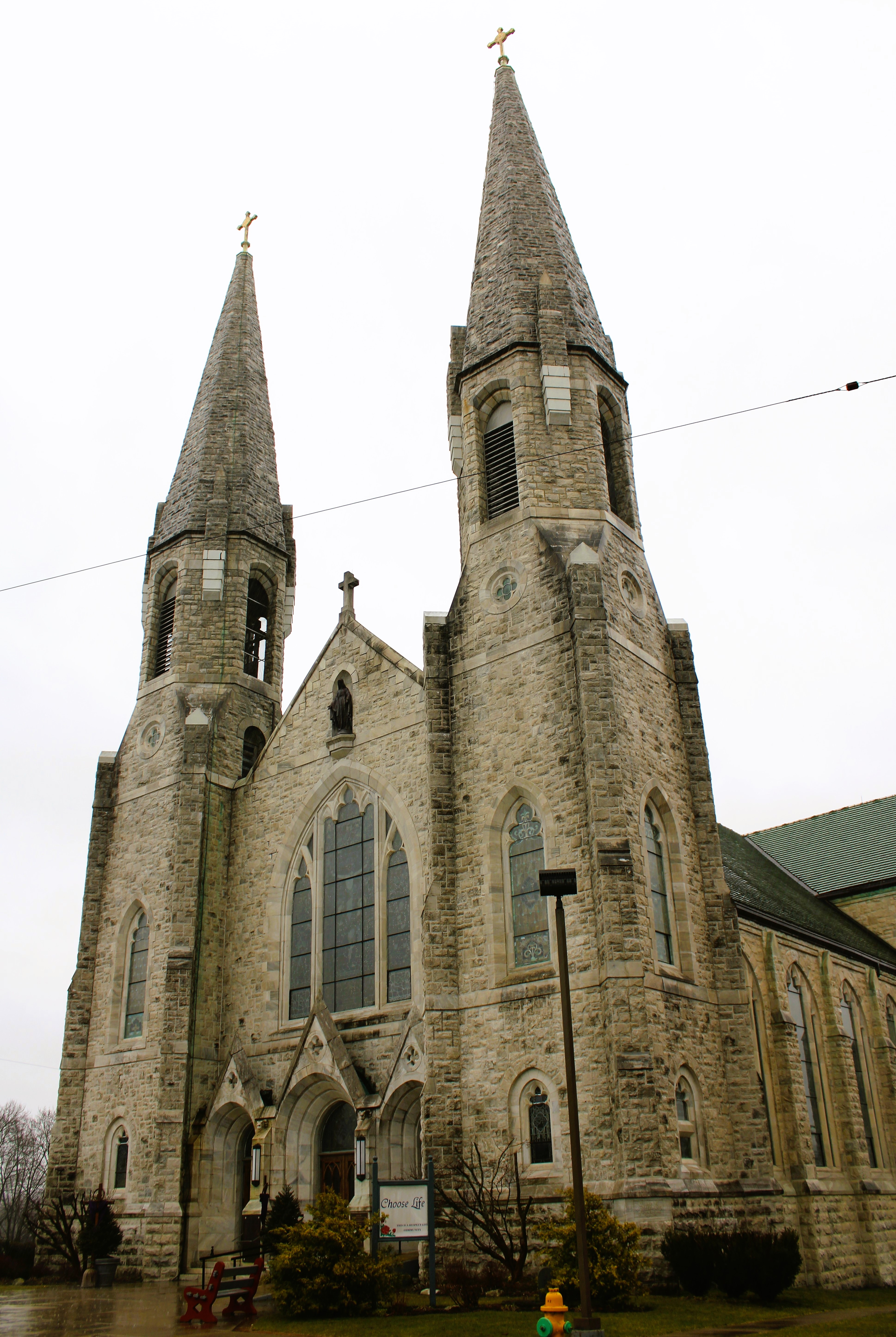
- Basilica in 2023
- Basilica of St. Mary of the Angels
- 42°4′31″N 78°25′52″W
- Location: Olean, NY
- Country: United States
- Denomination: Roman Catholic
- Tradition: Latin Rite
- Website: St. Mary of the Angels

History
- Status: Minor basilica
- Dedication: Blessed Virgin Mary
- Dedicated: February 14, 2017
- Earlier dedication: 1860; 1915

Architecture
- Functional status: Active, Parish church
- Architect: Emile M. Ulrich
- Architectural type: Church
- Style: Neo-Gothic

Specifications
- Length: 159 feet (48 m)
- Materials: Pennsylvania white marble

Administration
- Diocese: Buffalo, New York

Clergy
- Bishop: Michael William Fisher
- Rector: Rev. Dennis Mancuso, Vicar Forane

The Basilica of St Mary of the Angels is a Neo-Gothic Roman Catholic Minor basilica in the United States and a prominent landmark of Olean, NY. It is also a parish church, located on the west side of South Union Street between West Henley Street and Irving Street in downtown Olean, near the Allegheny River. It is considered one of the most visible symbols of Roman Catholicism in Olean, New York.

== History ==
=== Construction ===
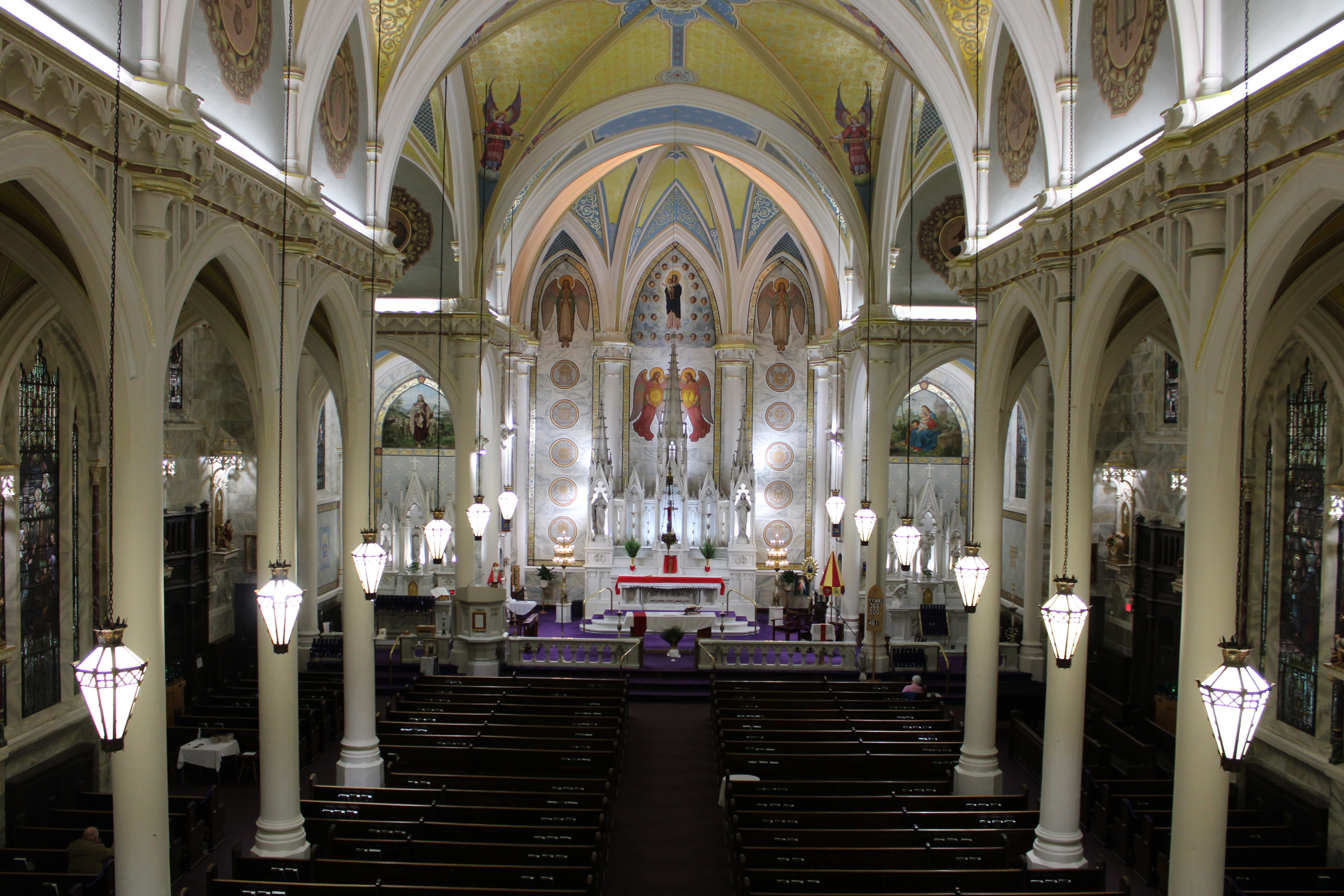
Interior of the basilica.

This Catholic church began in 1852 as a small wooden "shanty" church, built with $300 collected from railroad workers. The noted Franciscan missionary, Rev. Pamphilius DiMagliano, OSF, replaced that church with a more formal building costing $10,000 in 1860. Father DiMagliano dedicated the church to the patroness of the mother-church of the Franciscan Order at Assisi, St. Mary of the Angels.

Construction of the current Gothic Revival church started in 1913 under the supervision of French-trained architect Emile Ulrich of Cleveland. The Bishop of Buffalo Charles H. Colton laid the cornerstone of the church in November 1913. Completed in 1917 at a total cost of $250,000 (equivalent to $7.96 million in 2025), the most prominent feature was the twin 150-foot towers capped with stone steeples built almost exclusively of white marble from nearby Pennsylvania. The church was formally opened and blessed by Venerable Monsignor Nelson Baker on September 26, 1915.

=== Restorations ===
In the centennial year of 1952, the entire church interior was redecorated, adding religious images and medallions painted on canvas in New York that was then applied to the walls of the church. Angels on clouds carry banners with the words to the Hail Mary prayer in Latin. "Ora pro nobis peccatoribus, Nunc et in hora mortis nostrae" (Pray for us sinners, now and at the hour of our death). The altars, railing, pulpit, and baptismal font are crafted from Carrara marble from Italy.

=== Papal decree ===
On Feb. 14, 2017, Pope Francis granted the title of Minor Basilica to St. Mary of the Angels in Olean, making it the 83rd basilica in the United States,

== Notable associations ==
- In 1940, Thomas Merton, a well-known spiritual writer, came to Olean to teach at St. Bonaventure College. It was in Olean that Thomas Merton made significant choices in his life, as chronicled in his bestselling autobiography The Seven Storey Mountain (1948). Merton often went to St. Mary of the Angels to pray and to go to confession. At the close of 1940, he stopped into St. Mary of the Angels one last time to pray the stations of the cross before boarding the train taking him to a Trappist monastery in Kentucky. He wrote of a particularly beautiful experience in the church that night in his memoir.
- Louis Zamperini was baptized at St. Mary of the Angels in 1917. When he was a young child, his Italian immigrant family moved to California, where he would become a famous Olympic champion and WWII war hero.

== See also ==
- List of Catholic basilicas
- Roman Catholic Diocese of Buffalo
- Kane, Jennifer (2018). A Place Set Apart: Basilica of St Mary of the Angels Olean NY. 48HrBooks.
- Merton, Thomas (1948). The Seven Storey Mountain (1998 50th Anniversary ed.). Harcourt Brace Jovanovich. ISBN 0-15-100413-7.
