= Belle Prairie Township, Morrison County, Minnesota =

Belle Prairie Township, Minnesota
- Township
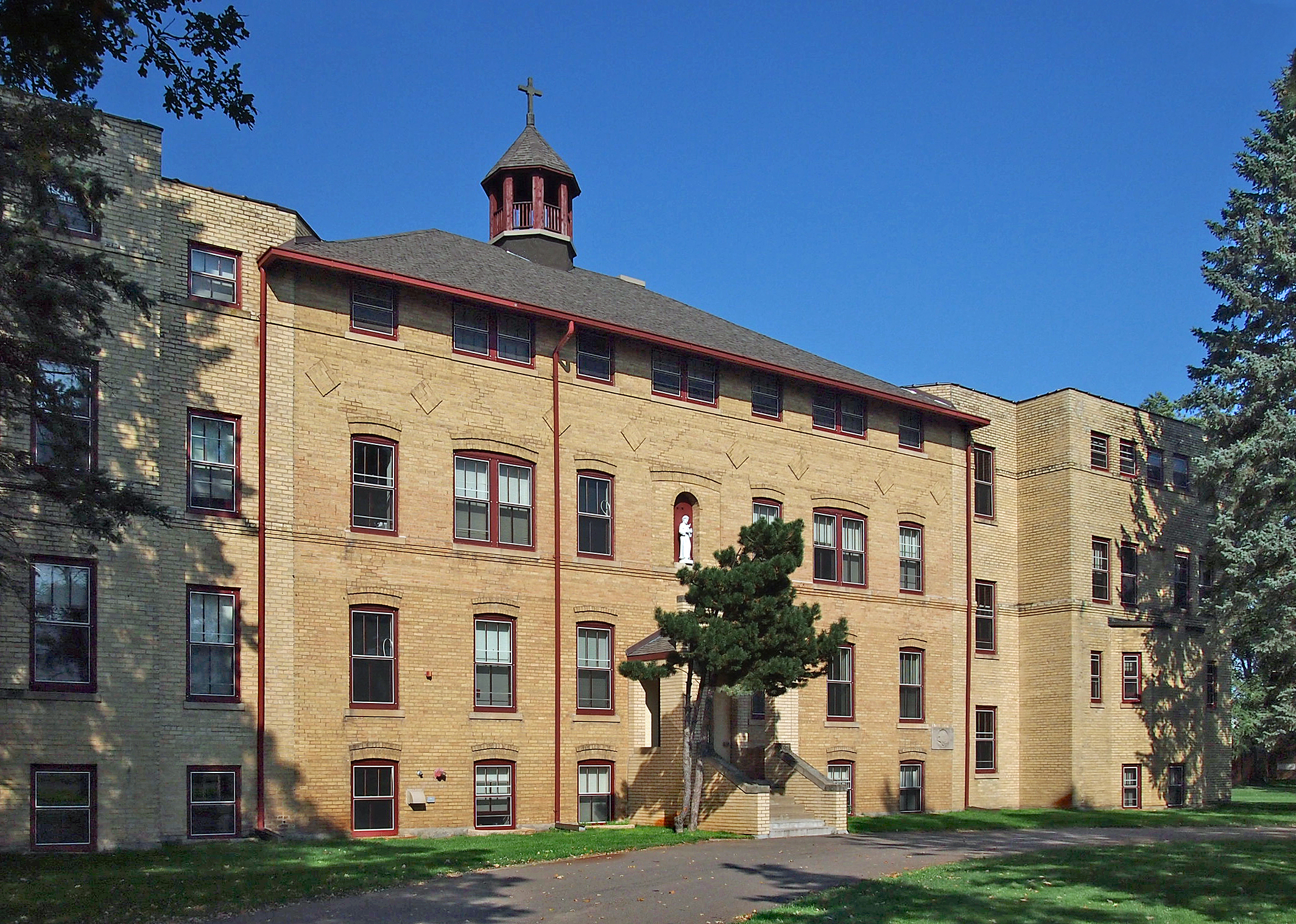
- Our Lady of the Angels Academy

- Location within the state of Minnesota Belle Prairie Township, Minnesota (the United States)
- Coordinates: 46°1′19″N 94°16′57″W
- Country: United States
- State: Minnesota
- County: Morrison

Area
  - Total: 45.5 sq mi (117.9 km^{2})
  - Land: 44.5 sq mi (115.2 km^{2})
  - Water: 1.0 sq mi (2.6 km^{2})
- Elevation: 1,161 ft (354 m)

Population (2000)
  - Total: 1,647
  - Density: 37/sq mi (14.3/km^{2})
- Time zone: UTC-6 (Central (CST))
  - Summer (DST): UTC-5 (CDT)
- FIPS code: 27-04888
- GNIS feature ID: 0663557

Belle Prairie Township is a township in Morrison County, Minnesota, United States. The population was 1,647 at the 2000 census.

Belle Prairie Township was organized in 1858. Belle Prairie is a name derived from French meaning "beautiful prairie".

Our Lady of the Angels Academy, located in the township, was added to the National Register of Historic Places in 2005.

== Geography ==
According to the United States Census Bureau, the township has a total area of 117.9 km^{2} (45.5 sq mi), of which 115.2 km^{2} (44.5 sq mi) is land and 2.6 km^{2} (1.0 sq mi) (2.24%) is water.

Minnesota State Highway 371 serves as a main route in the township.

== Demographics ==
As of the census of 2000, there were 1,647 people, 590 households, and 483 families residing in the township. The population density was 14.3 people /km^{2} (37 people/mi^{2}). There were 603 housing units at an average density of 5.2 units /km^{2} (13 units/mi^{2}). The racial makeup of the township was 98.91% White, 0.36% African American, 0.12% Native American, 0.18% Asian, 0.06% from other races, and 0.36% from two or more races. Hispanic or Latino of any race were 0.36% of the population.

There were 590 households, out of which 38.5% had children under the age of 18 living with them, 72.4% were married couples living together, 4.9% had a female householder with no husband present, and 18.0% were non-families. 15.8% of all households were made up of individuals, and 6.3% had someone living alone who was 65 years of age or older. The average household size was 2.79 and the average family size was 3.10.

In the township the population was spread out, with 29.8% under the age of 18, 5.0% from 18 to 24, 25.1% from 25 to 44, 27.2% from 45 to 64, and 12.9% who were 65 years of age or older. The median age was 39 years. For every 100 females, there were 102.8 males. For every 100 females age 18 and over, there were 100.2 males.

The median income for a household in the township was $50,156, and the median income for a family was $56,797. Males had a median income of $38,073 versus $26,250 for females. The per capita income for the township was $21,809. About 2.9% of families and 4.7% of the population were below the poverty line, including 6.2% of those under age 18 and 6.9% of those age 65 or over.
