= Our Lady of the Angels Academy =

- U.S. National Register of Historic Places
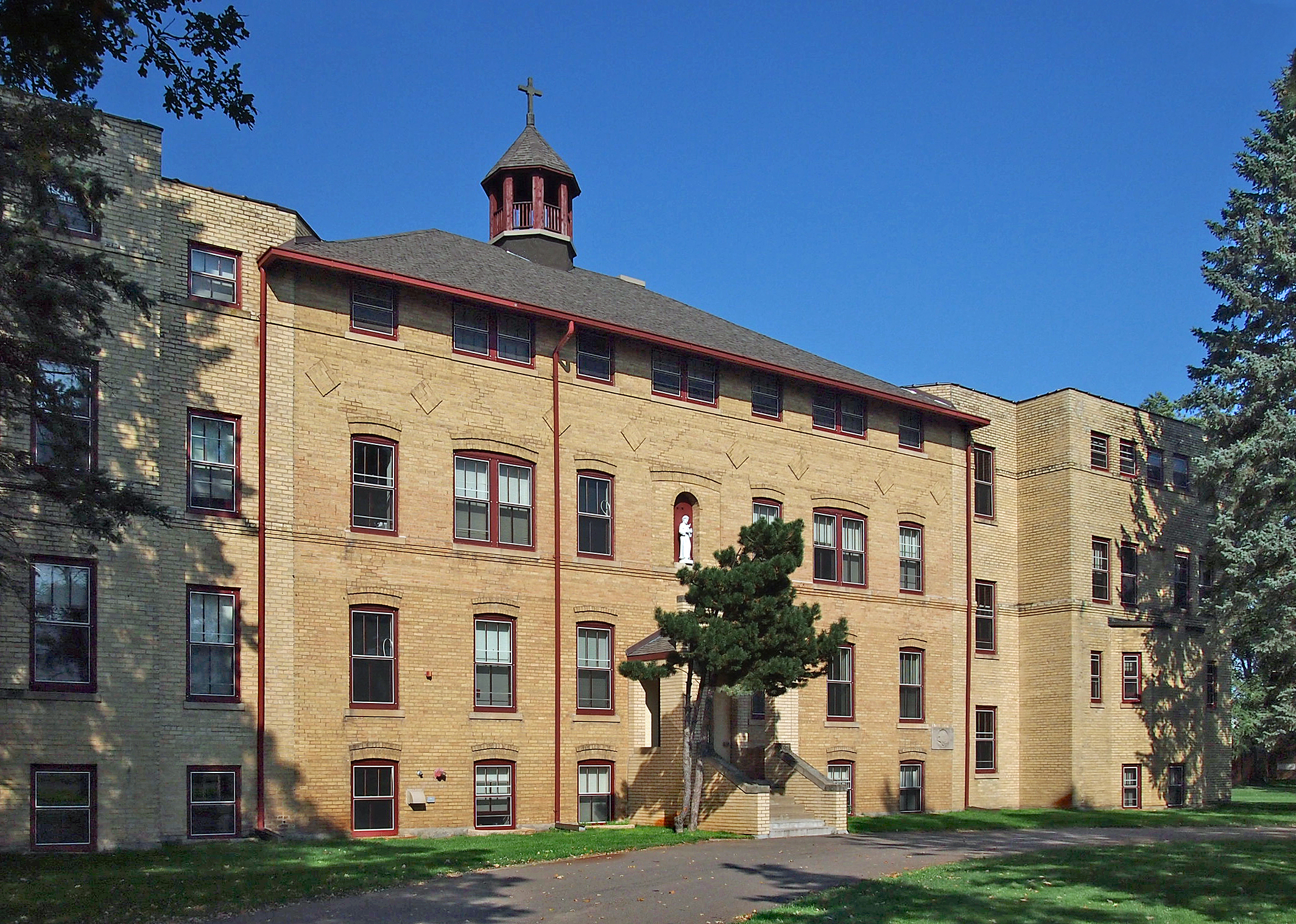
- View of the exterior from the southeast

- Location within Minnesota Location within the United States
- Location: 18801 Riverwood Dr., Belle Prairie Township, Minnesota
- Coordinates: 46°02′05″N 94°20′16″W
- Area: 2 acres (0.81 ha)
- Built: 1911
- Architect: Harrison, A.H.; et.al.
- Architectural style: Classical Revival
- NRHP reference No.: 05001474
- Added to NRHP: December 28, 2005

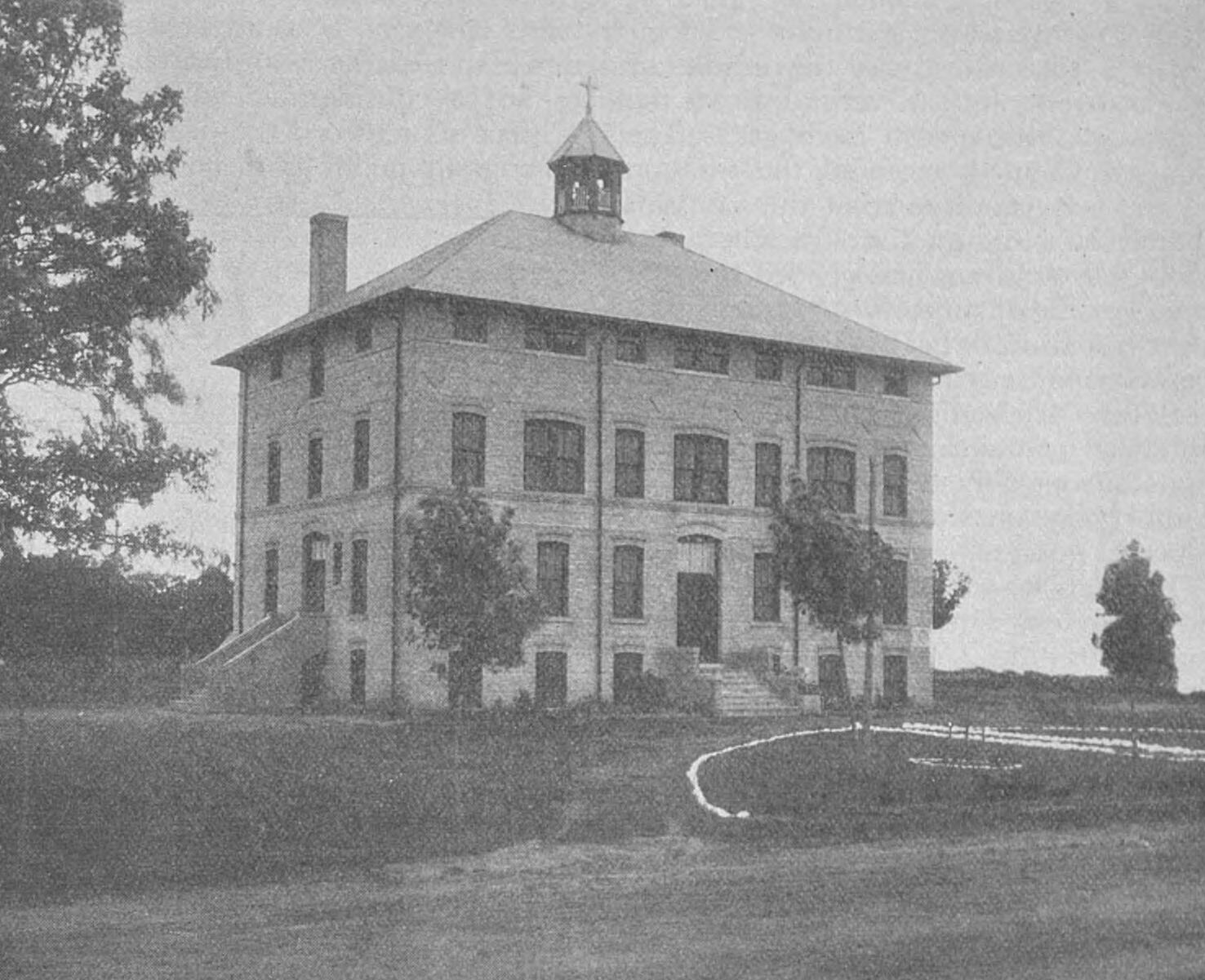
Academy of Our Lady of the Angels original building

Our Lady of the Angels Academy is a historic Catholic school in rural Belle Prairie Township, near Little Falls, Minnesota. The school was built in 1911 and underwent expansions in 1931, 1951, and again in 1958. The academy closed in May of 1969 and was added to the National Register of Historic Places on December 28, 2005, for its significance as a local example of the national Catholic school system.
