= St Mary of the Angels Basilica, Geelong =

Saint Mary of the Angels Basilica
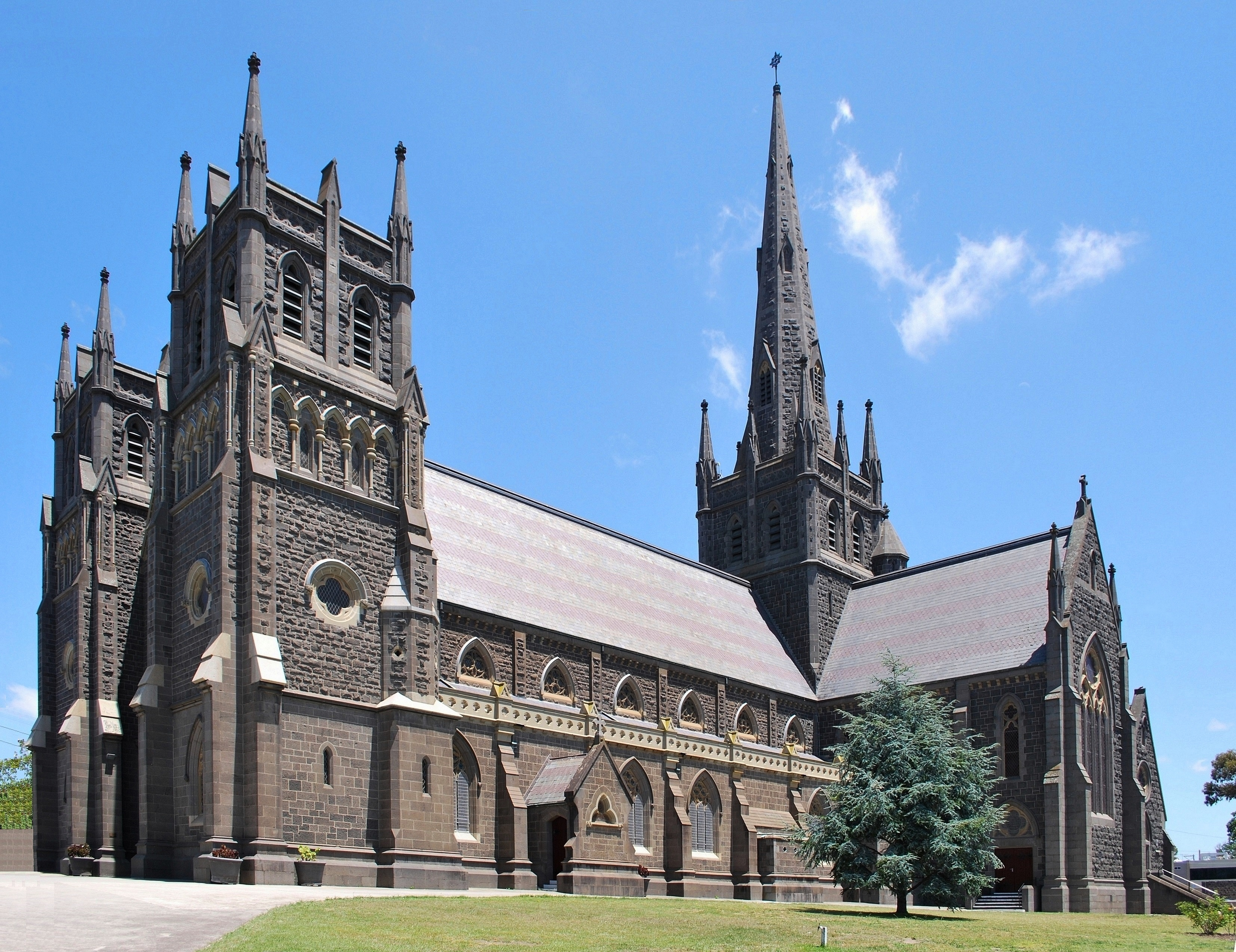
- St Mary's Basilica, Geelong, south view

- Location in Victoria, Australia
- 38°09′10″S 144°21′38″E
- Location: Yarra Street, Geelong, Victoria
- Country: Australia
- Denomination: Catholic
- Website: www.stmarysgeelong.com.au

History
- Status: Minor basilica
- Consecrated: 1872

Architecture
- Functional status: Active
- Architect(s): Messrs Dowden and Ross
- Architectural type: Gothic Revival
- Groundbreaking: 1854
- Completed: 1937

Specifications
- Capacity: 1,000
- Length: 61 metres (200 ft)
- Width: 40 metres (130 ft)
- Height: 64 metres (210 ft)

Administration
- Archdiocese: Melbourne
- Parish: St Mary of the Angels

The Basilica of Saint Mary of the Angels is a Roman Catholic basilica located in Yarra Street, Geelong, Victoria, Australia.

Since the completion of the Gothic Revival bluestone building in 1937, St. Mary of the Angels has had the tallest bluestone spire in Australia, at 150 feet (46 m), and has the fourth-tallest non-cathedral spire in Australia

Pope John Paul II raised the shrine to the status of Minor Basilica on 9 June 2004.

It is the third tallest building in Geelong, with a total height of 210 feet (64 m) from the pavement, and is a major landmark in the city.

== History ==
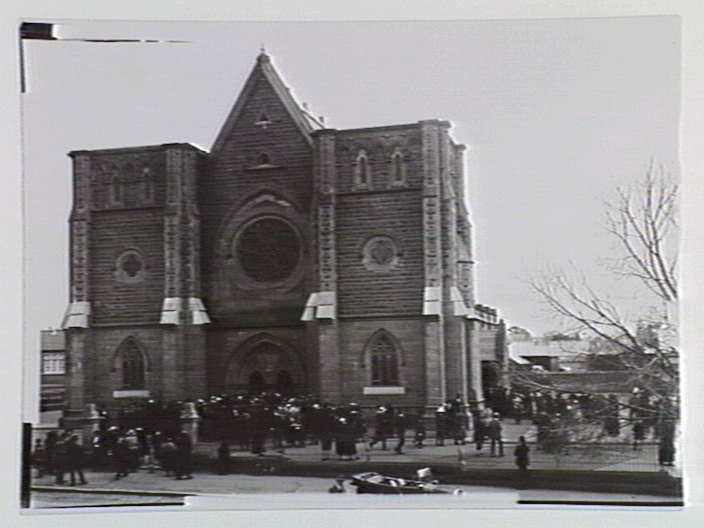
St. Mary's Church, 1932

The first St. Mary's church was a small wooden chapel in Yarra Street, opened on 27 November 1842. The congregation quickly outgrew the chapel and a stone replacement was constructed in 1846.

The optimism the Victorian gold rush brought to Geelong led to plans for a cathedral-like landmark church for the city. The architects were Dowden & Ross, and the foundation stone was laid in 1854.

However, as Geelong's boom slowed, work ceased two years later, leaving Geelong with an incomplete landmark for over a decade.

Construction was revived in 1871 when Archdeacon R. S. Downing contracted architect TA Kelly and builder Clement Nash to continue works, which ceased in 1872 with the bulk of the nave completed.

Work on the remainder of the church, the front tower crowns, the transepts, the crossing and spire, and apsidal chapels did not begin until 1930. The completion was based on the original design, the supervising architects being Hennessy & Hennessy of Sydney, and the builder W J Kelly of Geelong. The completion of the church was celebrated in June 1937.

== Architecture ==
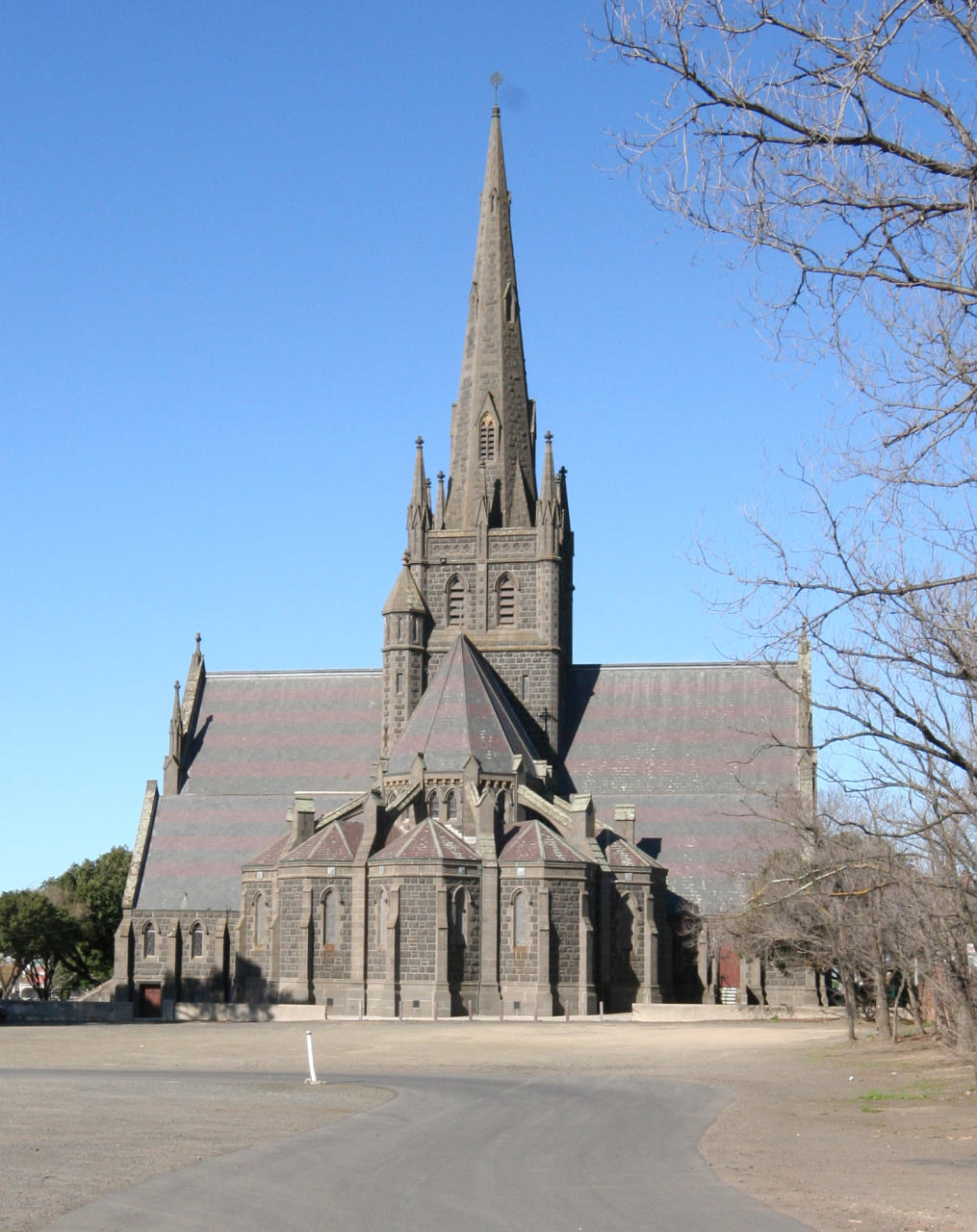
Rear of the basilica

The phosphor bronze cross at the top of the spire was cast by Evans & Co. in 1935, and is 8 feet (2.4 m) high.

== See also ==
- List of basilicas
