= Papal Basilica of Saint Mary of the Angels in Assisi =

Coordinates: 43°03′30″N 12°34′50″E

Basilica of Saint Mary of the Angels
- Basilica di Santa Maria Degli Angeli
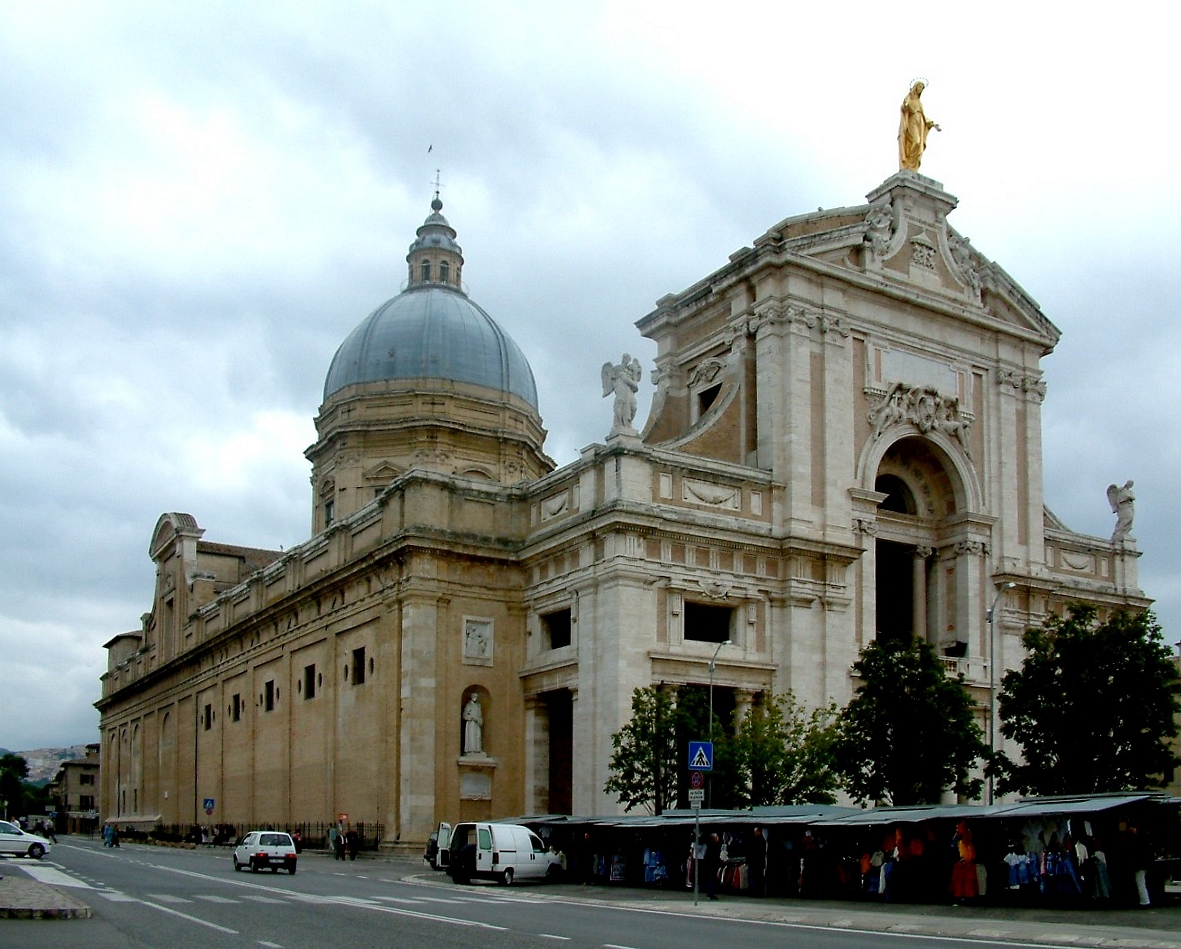
- Basilica of Saint Mary of the Angels
- Location: Assisi
- Country: Italy
- Denomination: Roman Catholic
- Religious order: Order of Friars Minor

History
- Status: Papal minor basilica
- Consecrated: 1679

Architecture
- Functional status: Active
- Architect(s): Galeazzo Alessi and Vignola
- Architectural type: Church
- Style: Mannerist; Baroque
- Years built: 1569–1679; 1836–1840 (reconstruction)

Specifications
- Length: 126 metres (413 ft)
- Width: 65 metres (213 ft)

Administration
- Division: Pontifical Legation for the Basilicas of St. Francis and St. Mary of the Angels
- Province: Perugia-Città della Pieve
- Diocese: Assisi-Nocera Umbra-Gualdo Tadino

UNESCO World Heritage Site
- Type: Cultural
- Criteria: i, ii, iii, iv, vi
- Designated: 2000 (24th session)
- Part of: Assisi, the Basilica of San Francesco and Other Franciscan Sites
- Reference no.: 990

The Basilica of Saint Mary of the Angels (Italian: Basilica di Santa Maria degli Angeli) is a papal minor basilica situated in the plain at the foot of the hill of Assisi, Italy, in the frazione of Santa Maria degli Angeli.

The basilica was constructed in the Mannerist style between 1569 and 1679, enclosing the 9th-century little church, the Porziuncola, the most sacred place for the Franciscans. It was here that the young Francis of Assisi understood his vocation and renounced the world in order to live in poverty among the poor, and thus started the Franciscan movement.

== History ==
After the death of Saint Francis in 1226, the friars built several small huts around the Porziuncola. In 1230, a refectory and some adjacent buildings were added. In the course of time, little porticoes and accommodations for the friars were added around the Porziuncola. Some foundations of these were discovered during excavations under the floor of the present basilica between 1967 and 1969.

As vast numbers of pilgrims came flocking to Assisi to receive the "Pardon of Assisi", the small space of the Porziuncola became completely inadequate to house all these pilgrims. The necessity grew to build a church incorporating the Porziuncola. The buildings around the shrine were taken down by order of Pope Pius V (1566–1572), except the Chapel of the Transito, the cell in which St. Francis had died. Construction of the basilica started on 25 March 1569.

The church was designed in a bold Mannerist style, which prefigured the Baroque style, by two famous architects, Galeazzo Alessi and Vignola. The work progressed slowly, due to a constant lack of money, as the building was financed with donations. The noteworthy dome, resting on an octagonal drum with eight windows and cornices, was finished in 1667. The construction of the church was finally completed in 1679. In 1684 a bell tower was added. It was originally intended to have a twin tower, but the second was never built.

On 15 March 1832 the central nave, a part of a lateral aisle, and the choir collapsed during a violent earthquake. The dome escaped destruction but was left with a wide crack. The apse and the side chapels were left standing. Reconstruction of the basilica started in 1836 by the architect Luigi Poletti and it was finished and reopened for worship in 1840. He remodeled the façade in a neoclassical style. Between 1924 and 1930 this façade was given back its original pre-Baroque style by Cesare Bazzani (Rome, 5 March 1873 – Rome, 30 March 1939). The gold-plated statue of the Madonna Degli Angeli ("Madonna of the Angels") by the sculptor Guglielmo Colasanti and cast by Ferdinando Marinelli Artistic Foundry, was put on top of the façade in 1930.

On 11 April 1909, the church was raised by Pope Pius X to the status of "patriarchal basilica and papal chapel".

== Description ==
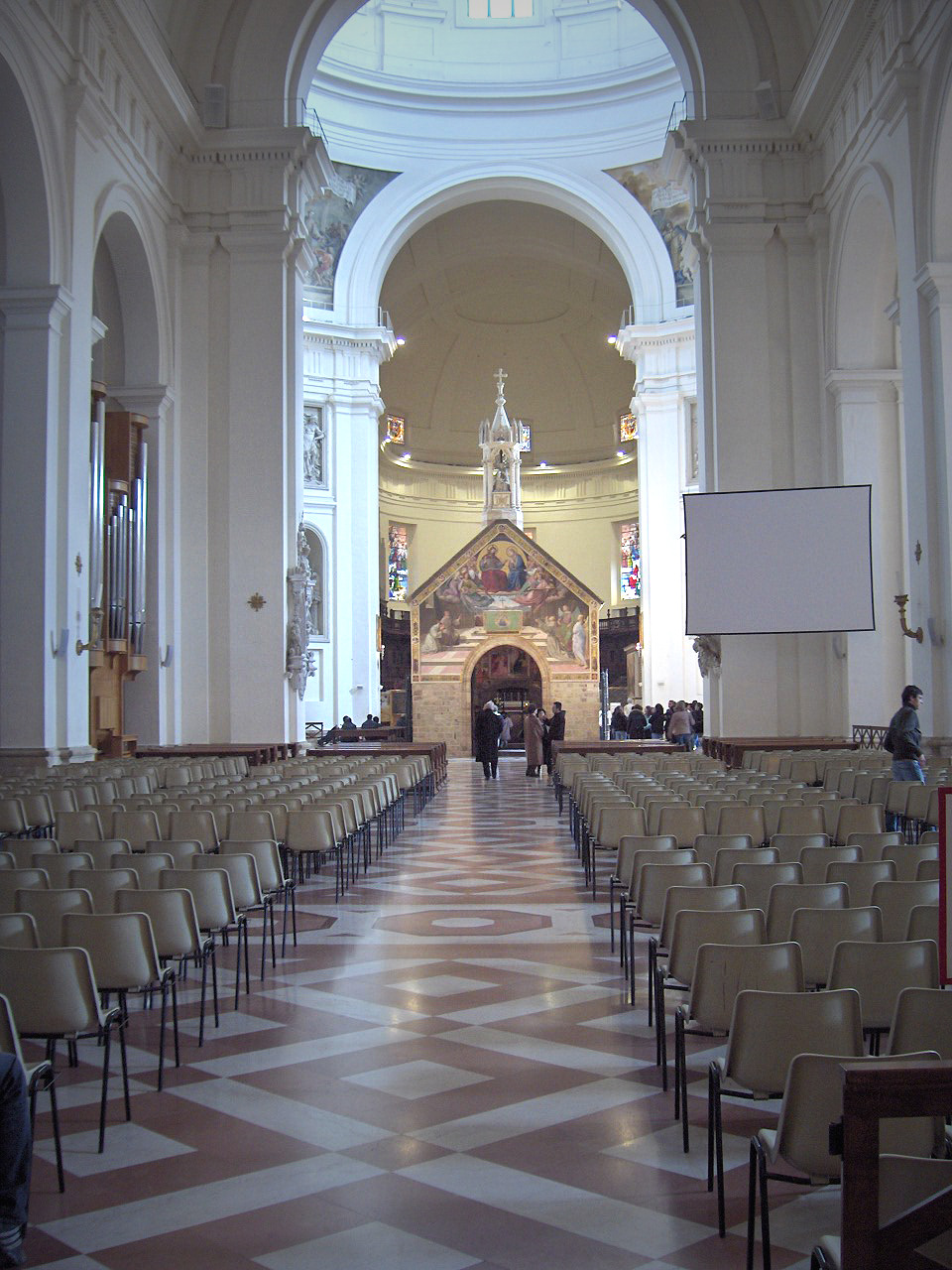
Nave with the Porziuncola.

The basilica has a rectangular ground plan, divided into a central nave and two lateral aisles, flanked by ten side chapels, with at the far end a transept, and a long choir in a semi-circular apse, protruding from the ground plan. The Porziuncola is situated directly under the dome.

The interior is simple and yet elegant, with only a few decorations, in stark contrast with the decorations of the side chapels. The nave and the aisles were rebuilt in neoclassical Doric style by Luigi Poletti. The apse holds the precious wooden choir, carved by Franciscan brothers starting in 1689, the papal cathedra (with bas-reliefs by E. Manfrini) and the papal altar. The Chapel of the Transito, the cell in which St. Francis died, is still preserved. It is situated under the bay of the choir, against the right columns of the dome.

The side chapels were decorated by great artists from several periods, including Antonio Circignani (all paintings in the Chapel of St Anne, 1602–1603), Francesco Appiani, (Chapels of St. Anthony and St. Peter in Chains, 1756–1760), and Ventura Salimbeni (Chapel of the Removal of the Lord, 1602).

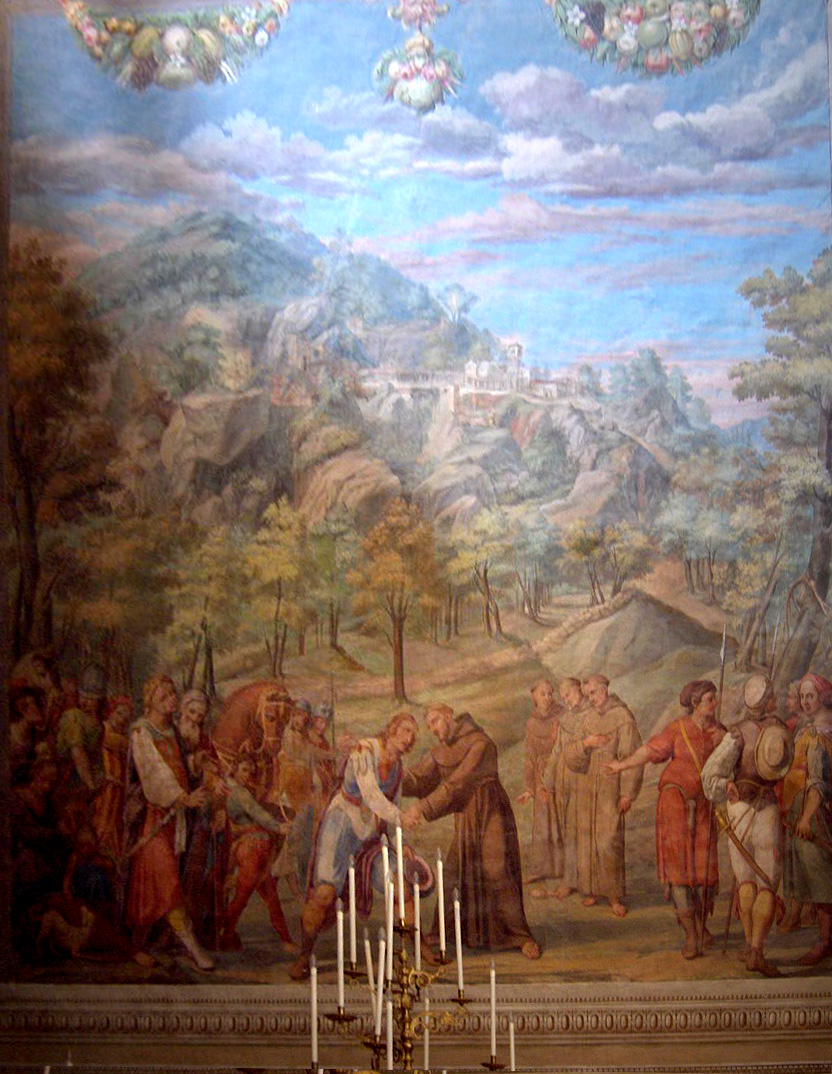
St. Francis receives men and women into the Third Order of Penance, at Cannara; painting by Baldassare Croci (1602–1603)

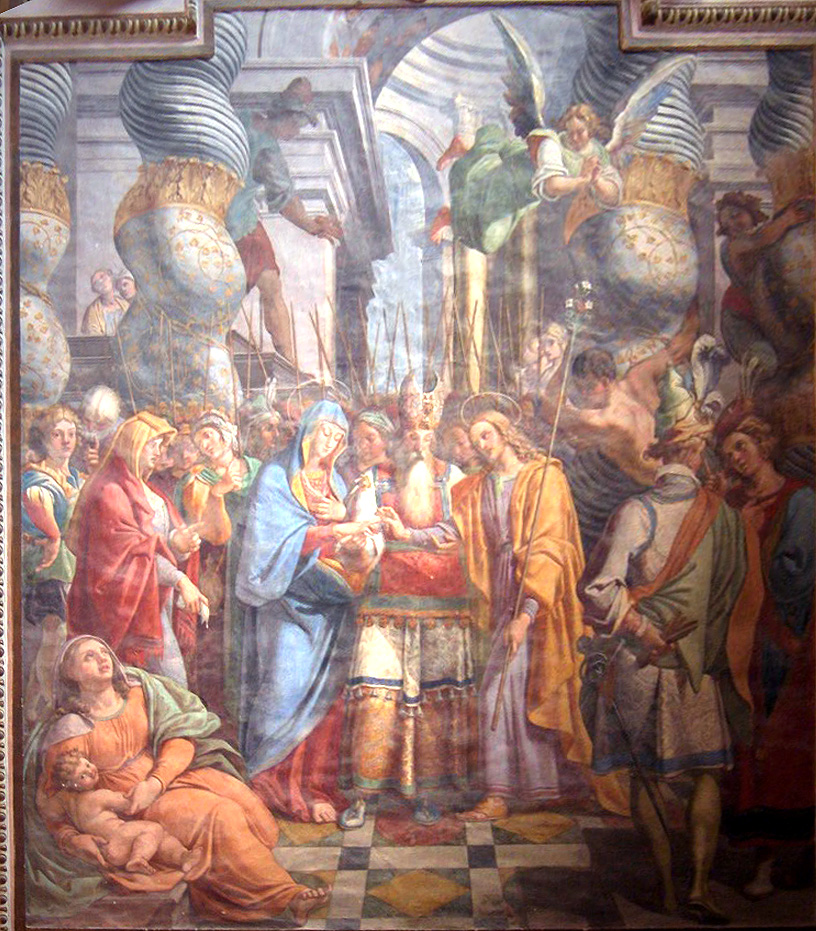
Wedding of the Virgin, painting by Antonio Circignani (Pomarancio) (1602–1603)

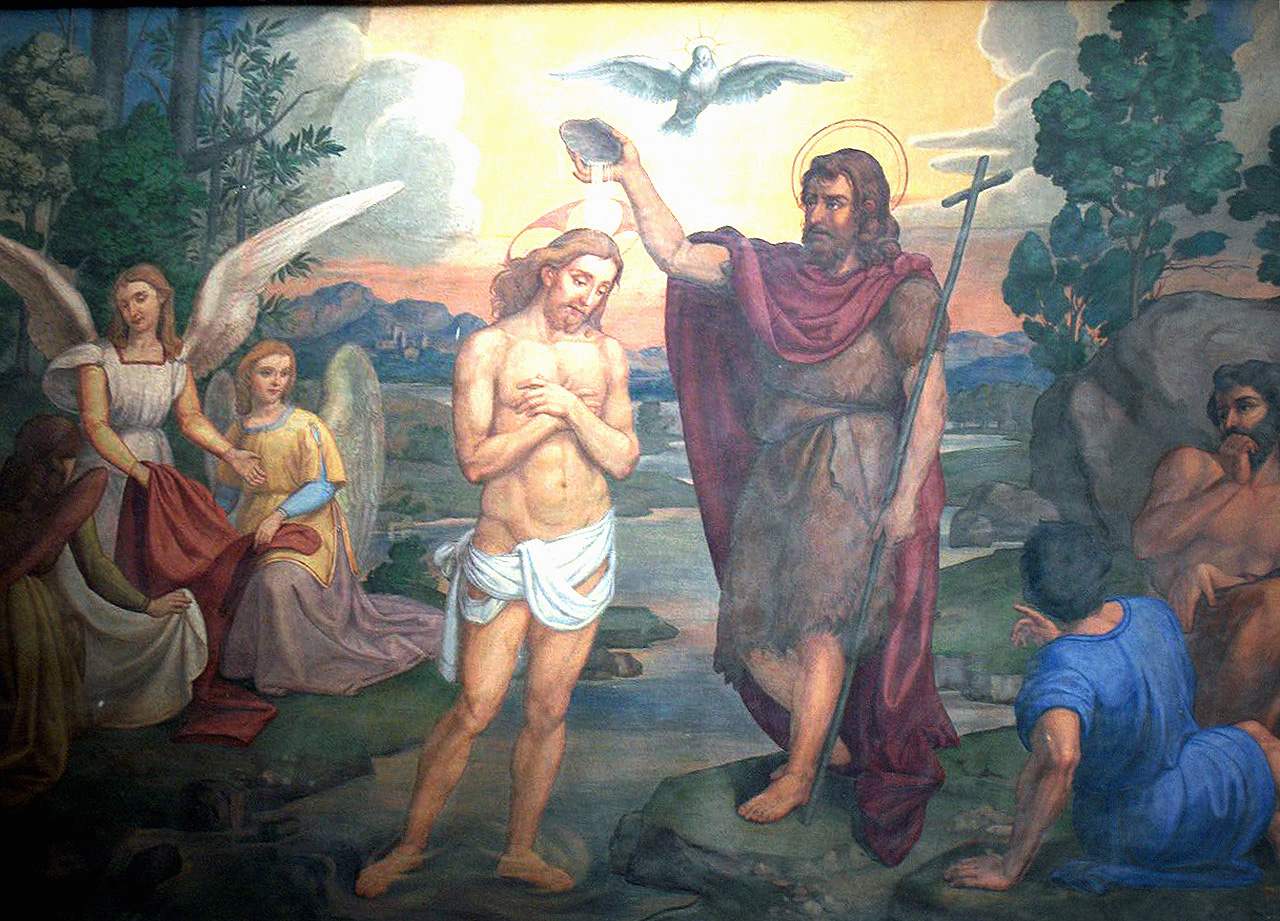
St. John the Baptist baptizes Jesus in the Jordan; painting by Giorgetti di Assisi

== The Porziuncola ==
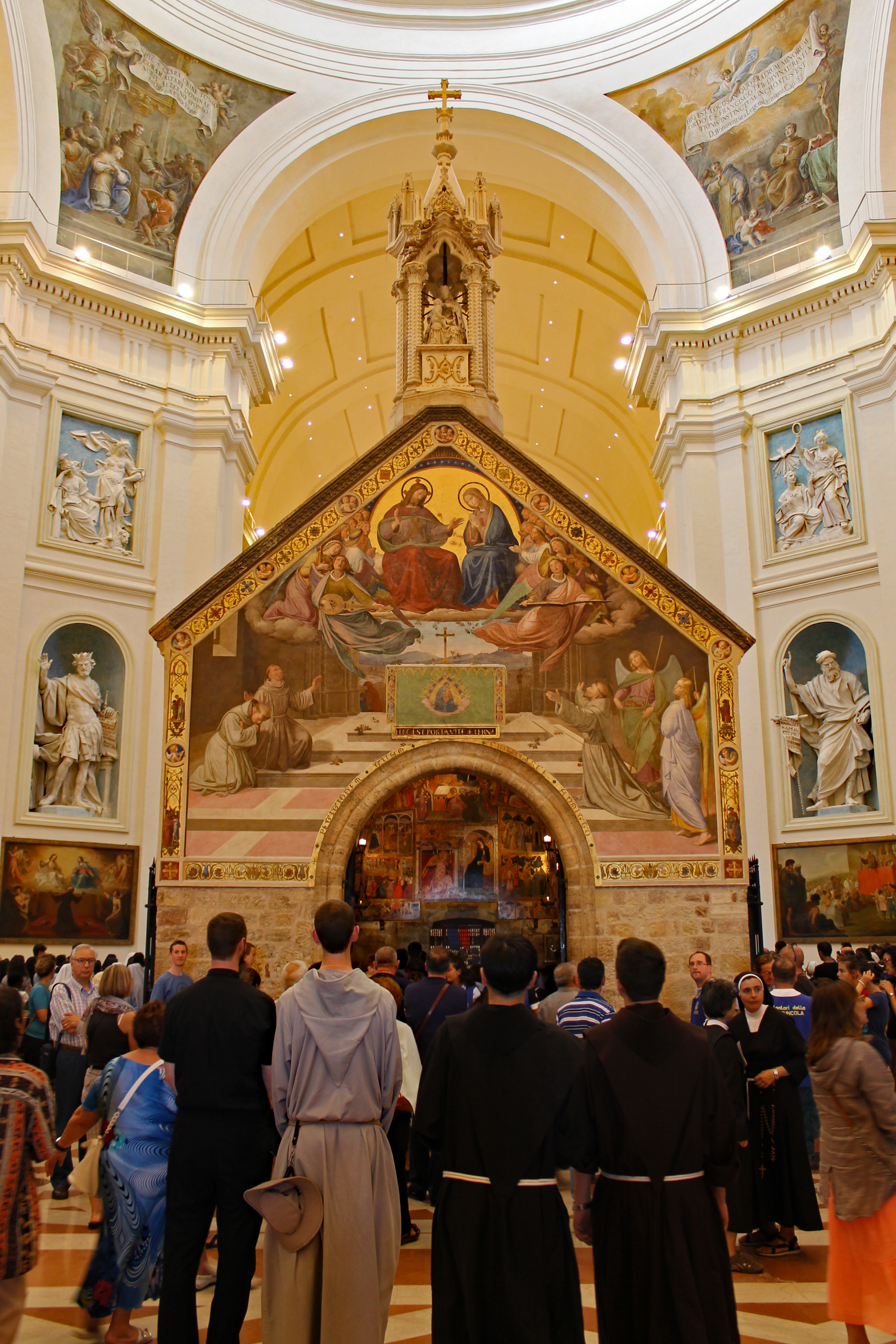
The Porziuncola, pictured with crowds surrounding it on the Feast of the Pardon.

The chiesetta (little church) of Porziuncola (Italian for "Little portion") is the most sacred place for Franciscans. Francis was given this little church, dating from the 9th century, by the Benedictine monks.

The church is decorated by artists from different periods. Above the entrance is the fresco by Johann Friedrich Overbeck (1829) depicting St. Francis receiving from the Christ and the Virgin the indulgence, known as the "Pardon of Assisi". The side wall on the right side shows fragments of two frescoes by an unknown Umbrian artist. The austere interior is decorated in a simple Gothic style with frescoes from the 14th and the 15th century. The most outstanding work is the six-part fresco in the apse of this little church, painted by Ilario da Viterbo (1393). At the back, above the entrance, is a fresco depicting the Crucifixion by Pietro Perugino.

== The Transito ==
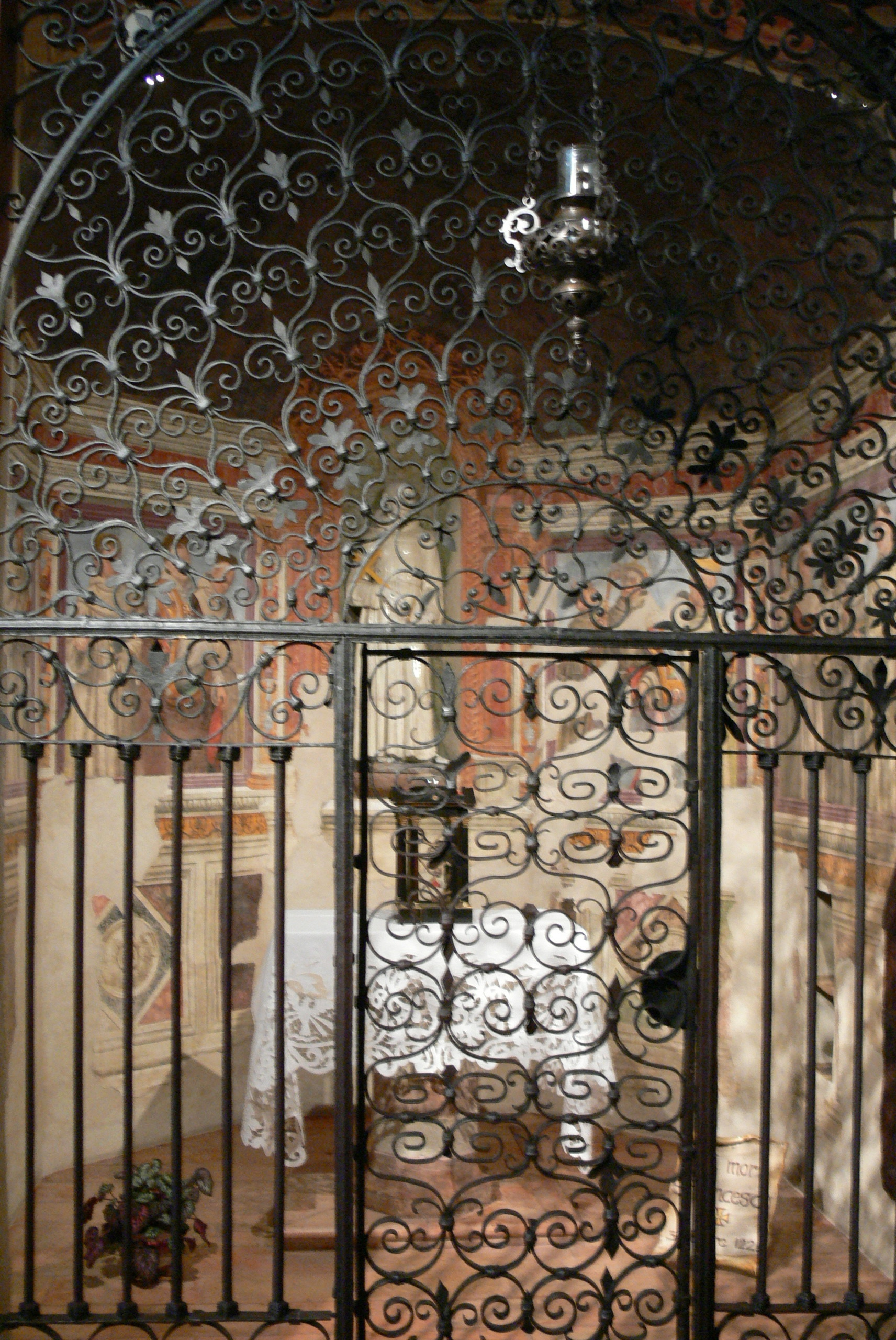
The Transito Chapel

The Cappella del Transito is the small room where St. Francis died on 3 October 1226. It was a little hut serving as a primitive infirmary for the sick. It is decorated at the outside by the fresco of The transito by Domenico Bruschi (1886). On the inside, above the small altar, is the rope of St. Francis. Behind the altar, there is a glazed terracotta statue of St. Francis by Andrea della Robbia (c. 1490). On the walls there is a fresco by Giovanni Spagna (1520), depicting the earliest followers of St. Francis, with their names above each portrait (Ruffino, Leone, Masseo and Egidio).

== The crypt ==
A new crypt was constructed behind the altar between 1965 and 1970. During the excavations, foundations of the original little huts, surrounding the Porziuncola, were exposed. The crypt's altar rests on a massive, multiple-branched tree trunk, sculpted by Francesco Prosperi. Behind the altar stands an enameled, terracotta, bas-relief tabernacle by Andrea della Robbia, expressing with an extreme finesse the emotions of the figures. The upper portion section includes St Francis receiving the Stigmata, the Coronation of Mary (with the angel musicians), and St Jerome the Penitent; the lower has the Annunciation, the Nativity, and the Adoration by the Magi.

== The Rose Garden and the Rose Chapel ==
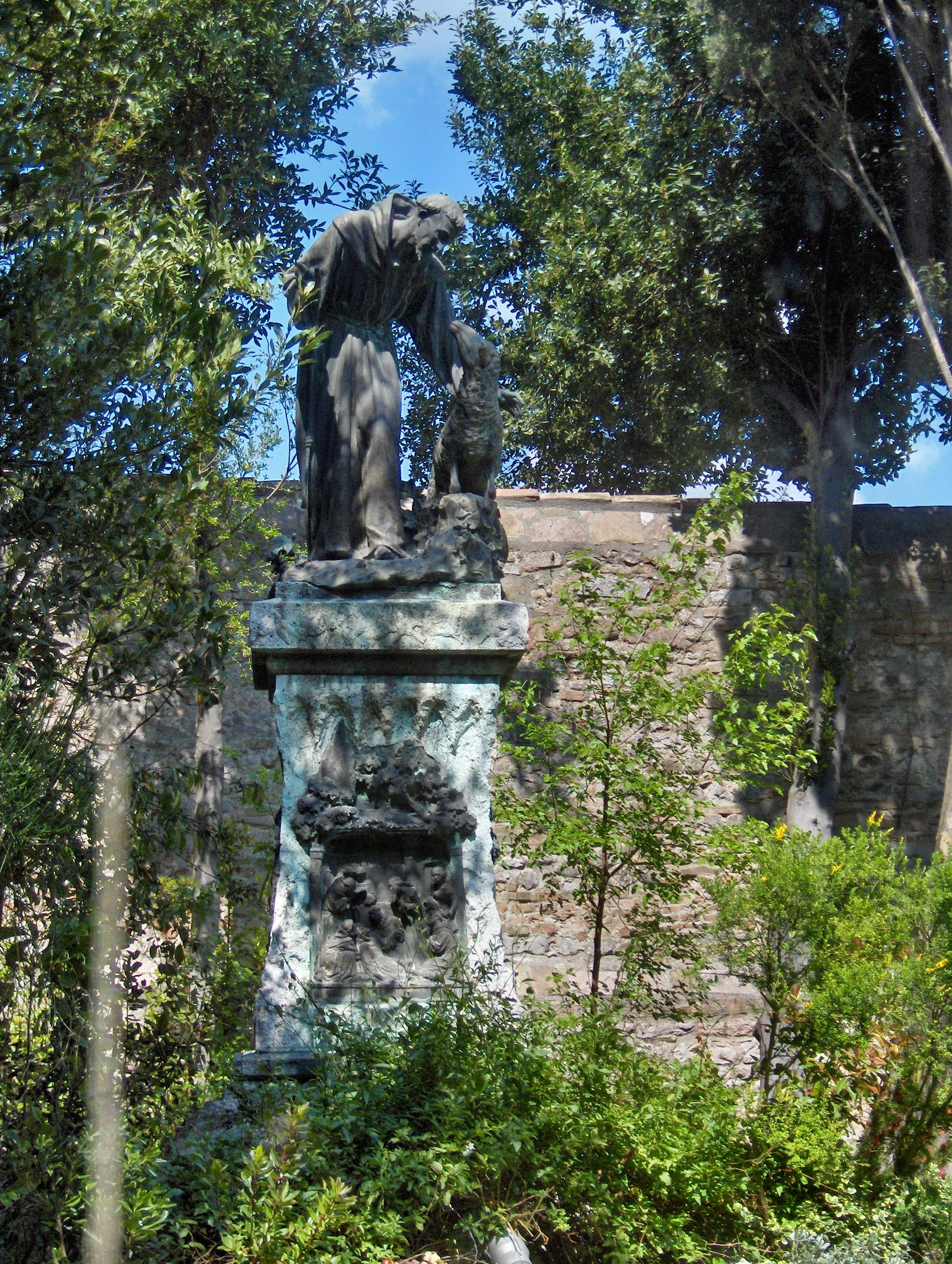
Rose garden – bronze statue by V. Rossignoli (1916).

One enters the rose garden via the sacristy. It is the last remains of the ancient wood in which St Francis and his friars lived. Here he talked to the turtle doves, inviting them to praise the Lord. Doves have been nesting since times immemorial in the hands of the statue of St. Francis in this rose garden.

According to tradition (already attested at the end of the 13th century), one night St. Francis, feeling the temptation to abandon his way of life, rolled naked in the bramble thorns in an attempt to overcome doubt and temptation. In contact with his body, the bramble bushes turned into dog roses without thorns. Since then, the dog rose cultivar Rosa canina assisiensis has been grown in the garden.

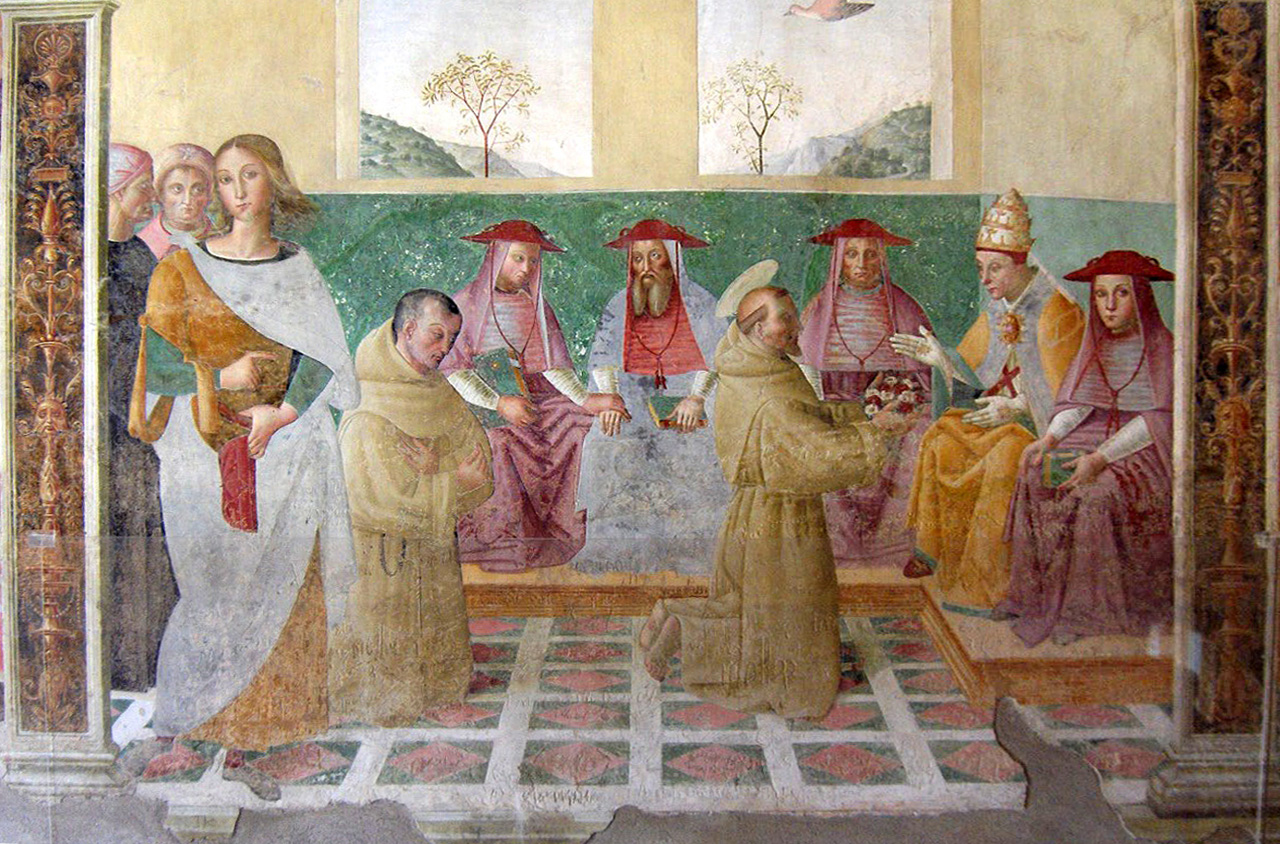
Concession of the Indulgence, fresco in the Rose Chapel by Tiberio d'Assisi.

From the rose garden, one enters the Rose Chapel. This was the cell where St. Francis rested and spent the rest of the night in prayer and penance. Here St. Francis also met Saint Anthony of Padua. After his death a chapel was built in the 13th century and enlarged in the 15th century by St. Bernardine of Siena. It was decorated between 1506 and 1516 with a series of frescoes by several painters, including Umbrian Tiberio d'Assisi who depicts the early Franciscan community and the first saints of the order, the miracle of the roses, and the concession of the indulgence.

== Museum ==
The little friary houses the museum of the Porziuncola with many religious objects, archaeological finds, and a noteworthy collection of paintings:

- the Crucifix by Giunta Pisano (1236)
- a wooden painting portrait of St. Francis by the (anonymous) Maestro di San Francesco (13th century); the body of the deceased saint was placed on this painting
- a painting on wood of St. Francis attributed to Cimabue
- a Madonna with Child by the Sienese painter Sano di Pietro (15th century)
- a terracotta by Andrea della Robbia (c. 1490) with in the top from left to right :"St. Francis receives the Stigmata", "Coronation of Mary" and "St. Jerome the penitent"; bottom, from left to right : "the Annunciation", "the Nativity", and "the Adoration of the Magi".
- St. Francis and St. Clare by Cesare Sermei and his workshop
- the Madonna of the Milk, a polychromed terracotta sculpture (end of the 14th or early 15th century)
- many frescoes of uncertain attribution.

== See also ==
- Roman Catholic Marian churches
- Los Angeles – city indirectly named after this church
- 17th-century Western domes
