= CHS Inc. =

American agricultural company

- Company type: Public
- Traded as: Nasdaq: CHSCP
- Industry: Wholesale agriculture products Fuels
- Founded: 1931; 95 years ago, as Farmers Union Central Exchange
- Headquarters: Inver Grove Heights, Minnesota, United States
- Key people: Jay Debertin (CEO)
- Revenue: ▲US$38.4 billion (2021)
- Operating income: ▲US$515.3 million (2021)
- Net income: ▲US$554 million (2021)
- Total assets: ▲US$7.998 billion (2021)
- Total equity: ▲US$9.017 billion (2021)
- Number of employees: 9,941 (November 2021)
- Subsidiaries: Cenex
- Website: chsinc.com

CHS Inc. is a Fortune 500 secondary cooperative owned by United States agricultural cooperatives, farmers, ranchers, and thousands of preferred stock holders. Based in Inver Grove Heights, Minnesota, CHS owns and operates various food processing and wholesale, farm supply, financial services and retail businesses. It also distributes Cenex brand fuel in 19 midwestern and western states as one of North America's largest c-store networks. It is a co-owner (with Mitsui & Co.) of Ventura Foods, a vegetable oil processor.

CHS is ranked 1st on the National Cooperative Bank Co-op 100 list of mutuals and cooperatives (ranked by 2012 revenue), and 96th (by 2017 revenue) in Fortune 500's 2018 list of U.S. corporations.

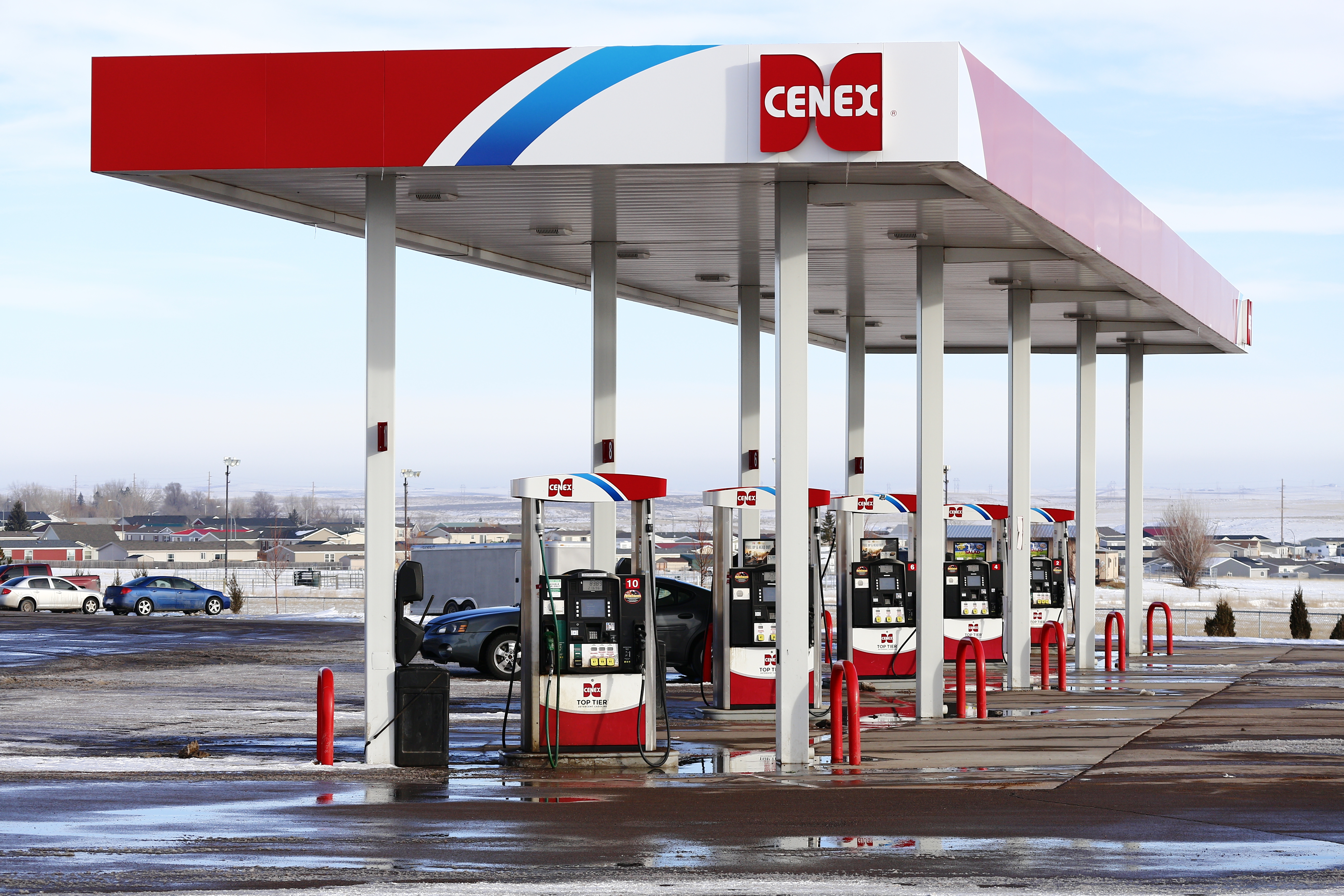
A Cenex gas station in Gillette, Wyoming

== History ==
CHS's history began in 1931 with the founding of the Farmers Union Central Exchange in Saint Paul, Minnesota. Later, the core cooperative company became Cenex, from the combination of the last two words in its previous name.

In 1998, Cenex merged with Harvest States Cooperatives. Harvest States was the product of a 1983 merger between North Pacific Grain Growers (formed 1929) and the Farmers Union Grain Terminal Association (formed 1938). The merged cooperative took the name Cenex Harvest States, adopting "CHS" as its brand name. In 2003, it changed its legal name to CHS Inc.

In 1963, the CHS unit formerly called Honeymead Products Company was involved in a major oil spill that reached the Mississippi River. 3.5 million gallons of crude soybean oil and processed salad oil from the Honeymead Mankato soybean oil processing plant and petroleum from the Richards Oil Plant in Savage spilled into the Blue Earth River and other nearby waterways, eventually diverting into the Mississippi River. Mass wildlife deaths and habitat destruction followed. Public outrage about the environmental devastation and inadequate government response led to state legislation to protect Minnesota waterways and the establishment of the Minnesota Pollution Control Agency four years later. No state agency previously existed to set or enforce rules to preempt environmental disasters and water contamination.

=== Co-branding with Eagle Stop ===
Eagle Stop is a chain of convenience stores headquartered in Missouri. As of 2022, the chain has 49 locations, all in Missouri. All Eagle Stop locations are co-branded with Cenex gas stations.

== See also ==
- CHS Ukraine
