= Mississippi River oil spill (1962–63) =

Oil spill in Minnesota

Mississippi River oil spill (1962-1963)
- Location: Minnesota River in Minnesota at Savage and Mankato
- Date: December 7, 1962

Cause
- Casualties: 2,735-10,000 ducks; 177 muskrats; 26 beaver; Uncounted amount of turtles, songbirds, and fish
- Operator: Richards Oil Plant; Honeymead Products Company

Spill characteristics
- Volume: 4.5 million gallons of mixed oil; 3.5 million gallons of crude soybean oil and salad oil; 1 million gallons of petroleum

From 1962 to 1963, oil processing plants in Minnesota spilled oil that reached the Mississippi River, causing a major environmental disaster. 3.5 million gallons of crude soybean oil and processed salad oil from the Honeymead Mankato soybean oil processing plant and petroleum from the Richards Oil Plant in Savage spilled into the Blue Earth River and other nearby waterways, eventually diverting into the Mississippi River. It is sometimes referred to as the Richards and Honeymead spills of 1962–63. As of 2002 it was considered the most damaging oil spill in state history.

Mass wildlife deaths and habitat destruction followed the spill. Public outrage about the widespread environmental devastation and inadequate government response to the disaster led to state legislation to protect Minnesota waterways, and eventually the establishment of the Minnesota Pollution Control Agency four years later. Previously no state agency existed to set or enforce rules to preempt environmental disasters and water contamination.

== History ==
In 1962 and 1963, industrial accidents spilled 3.5 million gallons of oil into the Mississippi and Minnesota Rivers. The oil covered the Mississippi River from St. Paul to Lake Pepin, creating an ecological disaster and a demand to control water pollution.

On December 7, 1962, workers at the Richards Oil Plant in Savage forgot to open steam lines that heated oil pipes at the plant. On December 8, these pipes burst in low temperatures. They spilled one million gallons of petroleum into the Minnesota River. By January 24, 1963, the Department of Health traced downstream oil back to Richards Oil. Employees claimed only a small leak had occurred. The Department of Health requested that Richards Oil clean up the oil but could only take action if there was a public health emergency. Richards continued to drain oil until March.

On January 23, 1963, a storage tank collapsed at Honeymead Products Company. The accident violently spilled 3.5 million gallons of soybean oil into downtown Mankato. The company recovered some of the oil, but citizens drained 2.5 million gallons of it into nearby rivers.

In March, the ice on the Minnesota and Mississippi Rivers thawed, depositing oil between St. Paul and Lake Pepin. The Twin Cities dumped industrial waste into this area of the river and the oil was unnoticed. This changed on March 28, 1963. Residents noticed oil-covered ducks struggling in the Mississippi River. Ice on Lake Pepin had dammed floating oil, creating a dangerous slick that coincided with the annual migration of waterfowl.

=== Response ===
Citizens began rescuing and cleaning ducks but were overwhelmed by the number of birds affected. Pine Bend resident George Serbesku brought oil-covered birds to the capitol to ask for assistance. On March 30, 1963, U.S. Fish and Wildlife Management sent officers to rescue waterfowl. On March 31, 172 dead ducks were identified and 300 more were rescued for cleaning. As oil entered nesting areas, Governor Karl Rolvaag declared a state of emergency on April 3. No state organization existed to respond so two units of the Minnesota National Guard were activated.

Public Health Services determined that birds could not see the colorless soybean oil. Exposed birds suffocated or had damaged feathers. This left them unable to move and vulnerable to hypothermia. Birds rescued for cleaning had only a ten percent survival rate. On April 6, the National Guard told Governor Rolvaag that they were struggling to remove oil from the Mississippi. Instead, the rescue effort began diverting oil from the marshes ducks nested in.

On April 8, 1963, the Coast Guard broke the ice on Lake Pepin so oil could disperse safely downriver. The spill caused 3,211 known duck deaths and damaged other bird, mammal, fish, and turtle populations. Water samples taken in June showed little biological activity in areas that had been healthy in April. Long-term damage to life was attributed to oil on the river bottom consuming oxygen as it decayed. Fish and insect eggs in the riverbed suffocated and large fish deaths occurred throughout the year.

Citizens were outraged by the damage done to riverbanks and wildlife. The government received thousands of dollars in donations to rehabilitate ducks, the primary victims of the tragedy. At the time industrial dumping into rivers was common. The only agency regulating water pollution was the Water Pollution Control Commission (WPCC). The WPCC was part of Public Health Services and could only act if a health emergency was created. Therefore, officials had to wait for permission from Honeymead and Richards to inspect their businesses. The sites of the spills could not be seen until April 6.

On January 30, 1963, Senator Gordon Rosenmeier, a conservationist, had introduced a bill giving the WPCC power to enforce rules preventing contamination of groundwater. The Rosenmeier Act was passed on May 22. Public demand resulted in an amendment to prohibit the storage of waste where it could enter state waters. The Rosenmeier Act sparked additional legislation on environmental protection. It also led to the creation of the Minnesota Pollution Control Agency in 1967. The Pollution Control Agency was the first state group to consider pollution an ethical concern.

== Legacy ==
As of 2002 it was considered the most damaging oil spill in state history.

Honeymead Products Company is now CHS Inc. through a series of acquisitions and mergers.

Environmental Protection Agency coordinator Don Rigger argued that there is "no clear and compelling evidence" that edible oil spills were less threatening to the environment than petroleum oil spills, based on a review of past documented edible oil spills including the Richards and Honeymead spills of 1962–63. Similar cases were in concordance that birds were unable to see or smell lightly colored edible oils in water, leading them to land and bathe in the oil rather than avoid it like they might with dark and pungent petroleoum oil. Edible oils are also more difficult to wash out of the feathers of an oiled bird. His preliminary research supported the conclusion that edible oil spills are more dangerous than the more common petroleum oil spills in regards to wildlife, especially waterfowl.

== See also ==
- Line 3 oil spill – another Minnesota oil spill in 1991
- Oil spill governance in the United States
