= Palm oil =

Edible vegetable oil from the fruit of oil palms

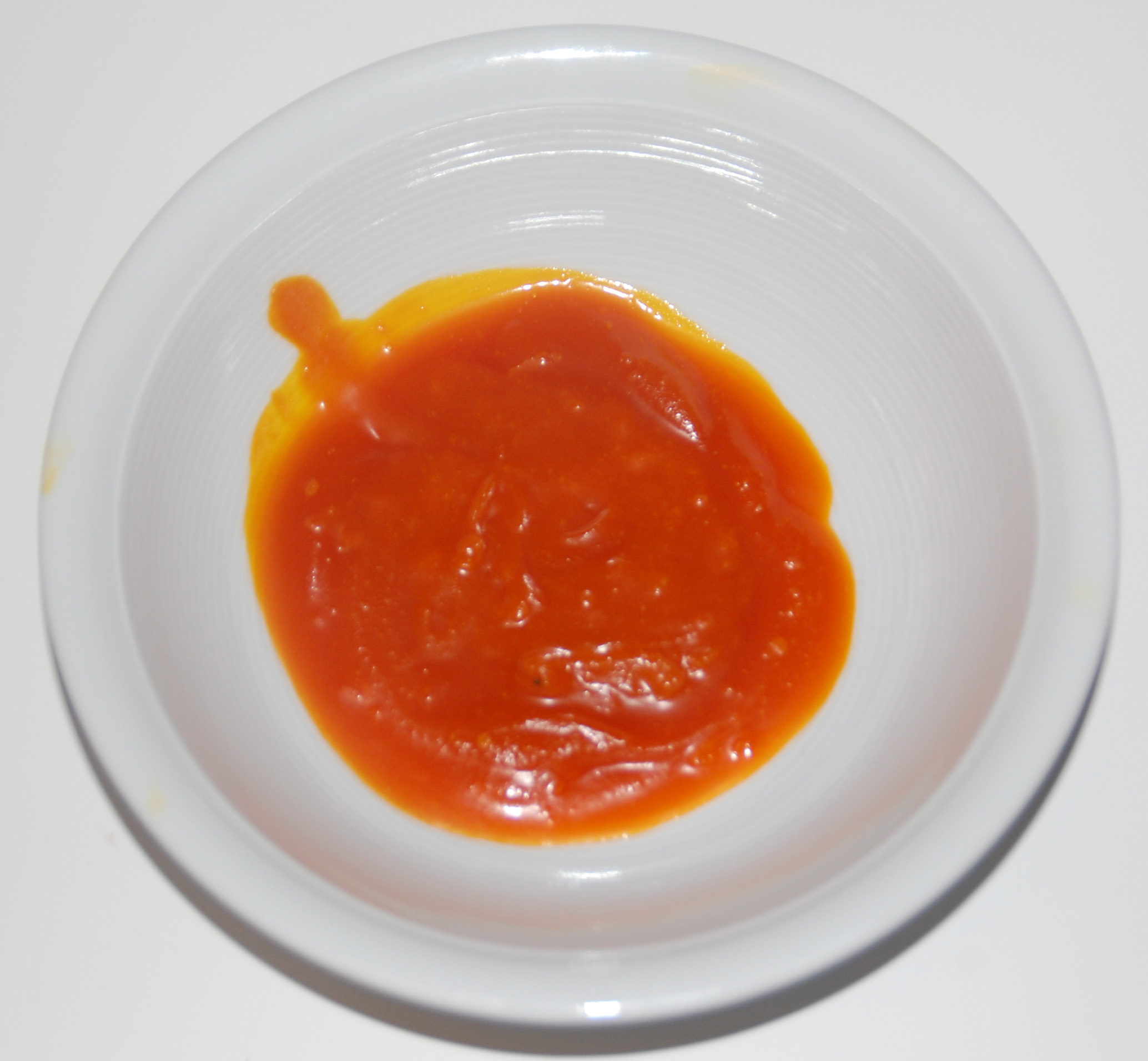
Palm oil

Palm oil is an edible vegetable oil derived from the reddish mesocarp (pulp) of the fruit of the African oil palm. The oil is used in food manufacturing, in beauty products, and as biofuel. Palm oil accounted for about 36% of global oils produced from oil crops in 2017. Palm oils are easier to stabilize and maintain quality of flavor and consistency in ultra-processed foods, so they are frequently favored by food manufacturers. Globally, humans consumed an average of 7.7 kg (17 lb) of palm oil per person in 2015. Demand has also increased for other uses, such as cosmetics and biofuels, encouraging the growth of palm oil plantations in tropical countries.

The mass production of palm oil in the tropics is a topic for substantial concern for environmental and human rights groups. The palm oil industry is a significant contributor to deforestation in the tropics where palms are grown and has been cited as a factor in social problems due to allegations of human rights violations among growers.

In 2018, a report by the International Union for Conservation of Nature acknowledged that palm oil is much more efficient than other oils in terms of land and water usage; however, deforestation causes more biodiversity loss than switching to other oils. The biggest global producers of palm oil are Indonesia, which produced 60% of it in 2022, followed by Malaysia, Thailand, and Nigeria. Indonesia produces biodiesel primarily from palm oil.

== History ==
Humans used oil palms as far back as 5,000 years ago. In the late 1800s, archaeologists discovered a substance that they concluded was originally palm oil in a tomb at Abydos dating back to 3,000 BCE.

Palm oil from Elaeis guineensis has long been recognized in West and Central African countries used widely as a cooking oil. European merchants trading with West Africa occasionally purchased palm oil for use as a cooking oil in Europe.

Palm oil became a highly sought-after commodity by British traders for use as an industrial lubricant for machinery during Britain's Industrial Revolution. Palm oil formed the basis of soap products, such as Lever Brothers' (now Unilever) "Sunlight" soap, and the American Palmolive brand.

By around 1870, palm oil constituted the primary export of some West African countries, which often accompanied oppressive labor practices, as highlighted in the account of Abina Mansah's life (and, human rights group argue, still does). However, this was overtaken by cocoa in the 1880s with the introduction of colonial European cocoa plantations.

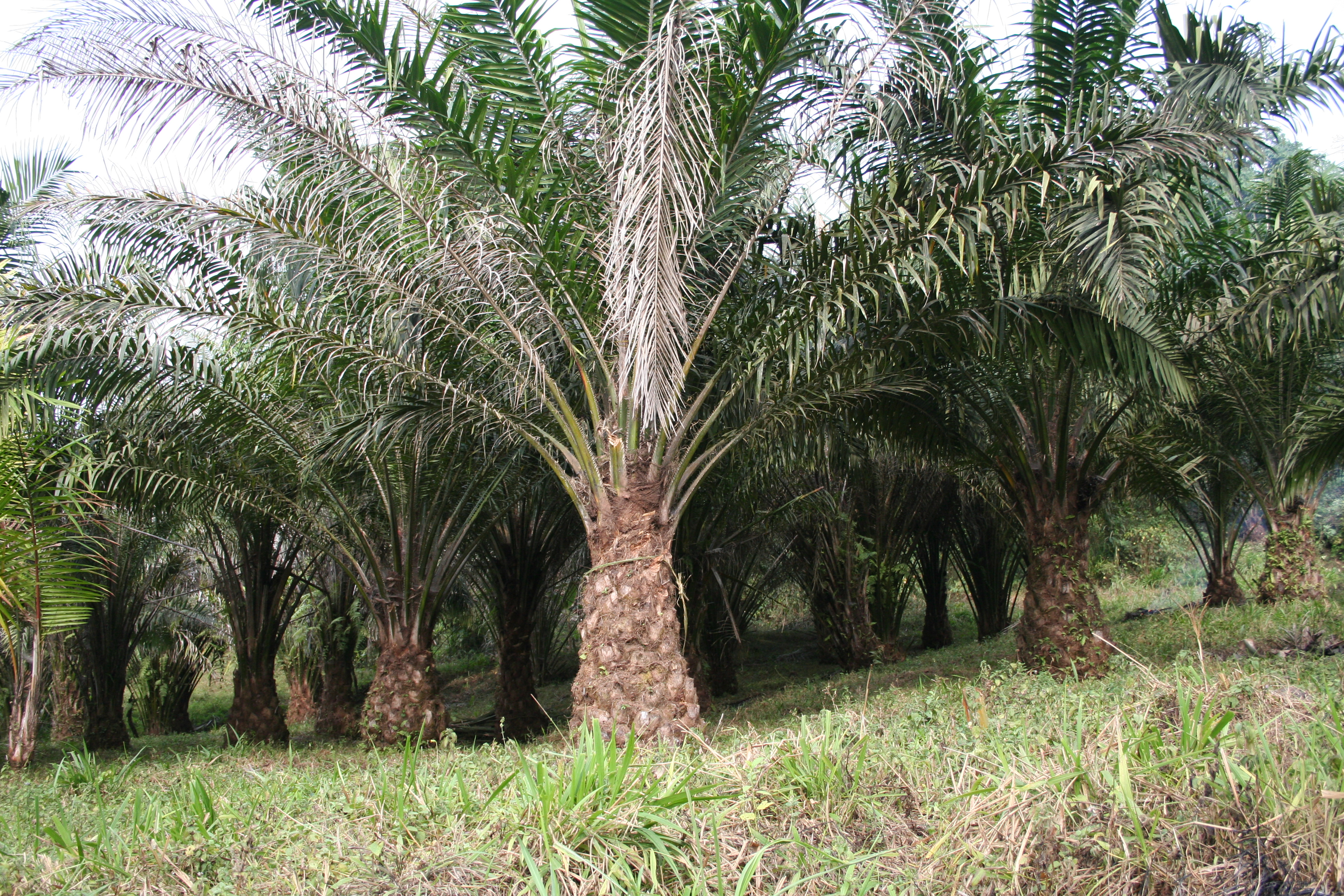
Oil palms (Elaeis guineensis)

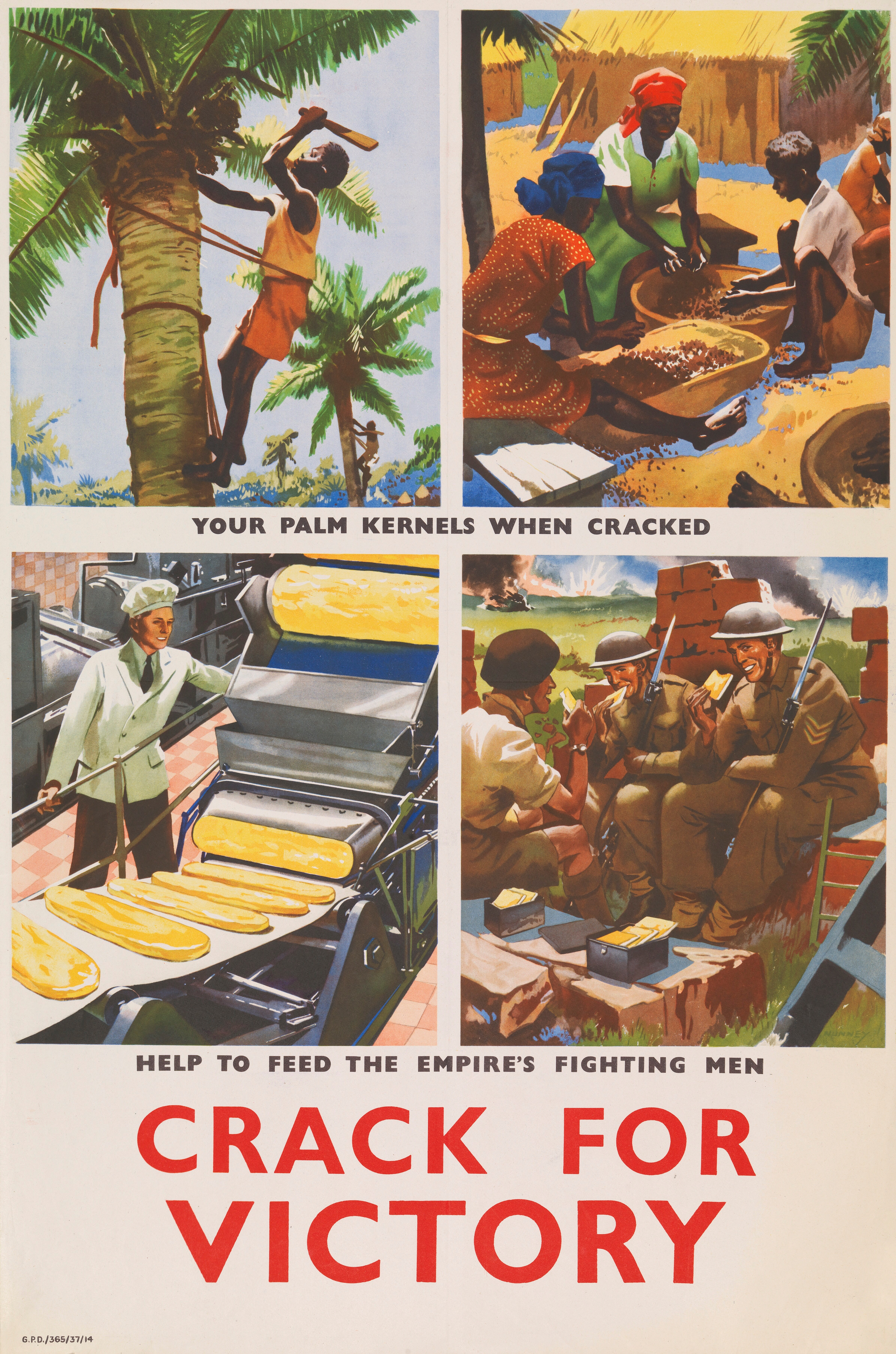
A World War II-era poster depicting palm kernel harvest and palm oil production as an important part of the war effort

== Uses ==
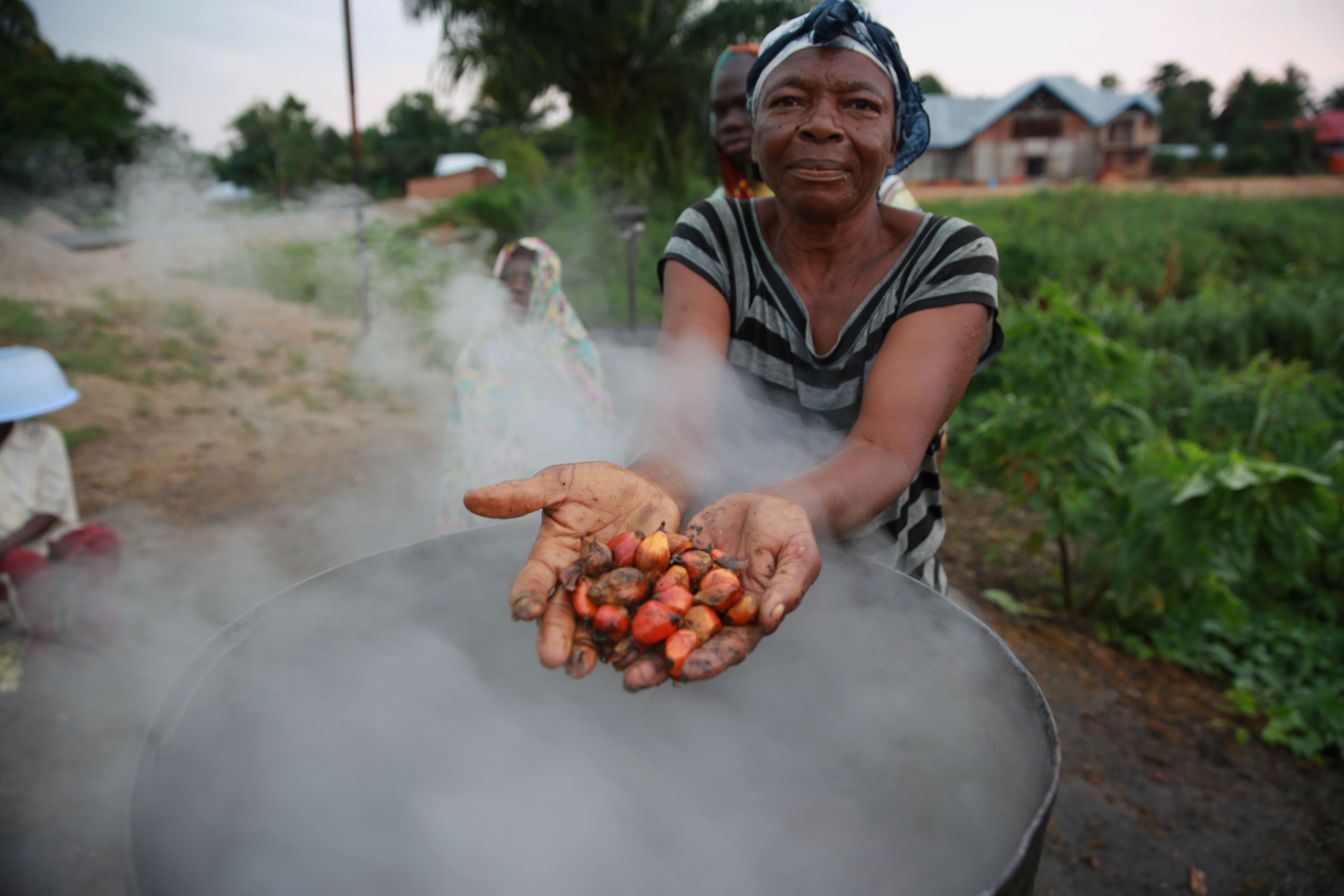
Palm oil production is done in some parts of the world artisanally, and the locally produced oil is used for food, handicrafts and other products. This woman in the Democratic Republic of the Congo is showing the palm fruit above a pot for processing the fruit.

=== Food ===
The highly saturated nature of palm oil renders it solid at room temperature in temperate regions, making it a cheap substitute for butter or hydrogenated vegetable oils in uses where solid fat is desirable, such as the making of pastry dough and baked goods. Palm oil is used in West African cuisine such as egusi soup and okra soup. Palm oil is sometimes used as a minor ingredient in calf milk replacer.

=== Non-food consumer products ===
Palm oil is pervasively used in personal care and cleaning products, and it provides the foaming agent in nearly every soap, shampoo, or detergent. Around 70% of personal care products including soap, shampoo, makeup, and lotion, contain ingredients derived from palm oil. However, there are more than 200 different names for these palm oil ingredients and only 10% of them include the word "palm".

=== Biomass and biofuels ===
Palm oil is used to produce both methyl ester and hydrodeoxygenated biodiesel. Palm oil methyl ester is created through a process called transesterification. Palm oil biodiesel is often blended with other fuels to create palm oil biodiesel blends. Palm oil biodiesel meets the European EN 14214 standard for biodiesels. Hydrodeoxygenated biodiesel is produced by direct hydrogenolysis of the fat into alkanes and propane. The world's largest palm oil biodiesel plant is the €550 million Finnish-operated Neste Oil biodiesel plant in Singapore, which opened in 2011 with a capacity of 800,000 tons per year and produces hydrodeoxygenated NEXBTL biodiesel from palm oil imported from Malaysia and Indonesia.

Significant amounts of palm oil exports to Europe are converted to biodiesel (as of early 2018: Indonesia: 40%, Malaysia 30%). In 2014, almost half of all the palm oil in Europe was burned as car and truck fuel. As of 2018, one-half of Europe's palm oil imports were used for biodiesel. Use of palm oil as biodiesel generates three times the carbon emissions as using fossil fuel, and, for example, "biodiesel made from Indonesian palm oil makes the global carbon problem worse, not better."

There are pressures for increased oil palm production from Indonesian palm-based biodiesel programs. The biodiesel currently contains a 30:70 palm oil to conventional diesel ratio (known as B30) at the gas pumps. The Indonesian government is aiming to produce 100% palm oil biodiesel (or B100) to transition out of using conventional diesel. The Indonesian government has estimated it would need to establish approximately 15 million hectares of oil palm plantations to meet these future demands.

The organic waste matter that is produced when processing oil palm, including oil palm shells and oil palm fruit bunches, can also be used to produce energy. This waste material can be converted into pellets that can be used as a biofuel. Additionally, palm oil that has been used to fry foods can be converted into methyl esters for biodiesel. The used cooking oil is chemically treated to create a biodiesel similar to petroleum diesel.

=== Wound care ===
Although palm oil is applied to wounds for its supposed antimicrobial effects, research does not confirm its effectiveness.

Palm oil imports

Land use for palm oil

== Production ==
In 2023–2024, world production of palm oil was 77.3 million tonnes, led by Indonesia with 57% of the total. The annual production of palm oil is projected to reach 240 million tonnes by 2050. During the 2022 food crises instigated by the Russian invasion of Ukraine and crop failures in other parts of the world due to extreme weather caused by climate change leading to food inflation, the Indonesian government banned exports of palm oil. This combined with a reduced harvest in Malaysia greatly increased global prices, while reducing availability causing ripple effects in the global supply chain. On 23 May 2022, the Indonesian government reopened trading, hoping to balance supplies.

Palm fruit oil production

Palm oil yields

=== Indonesia ===
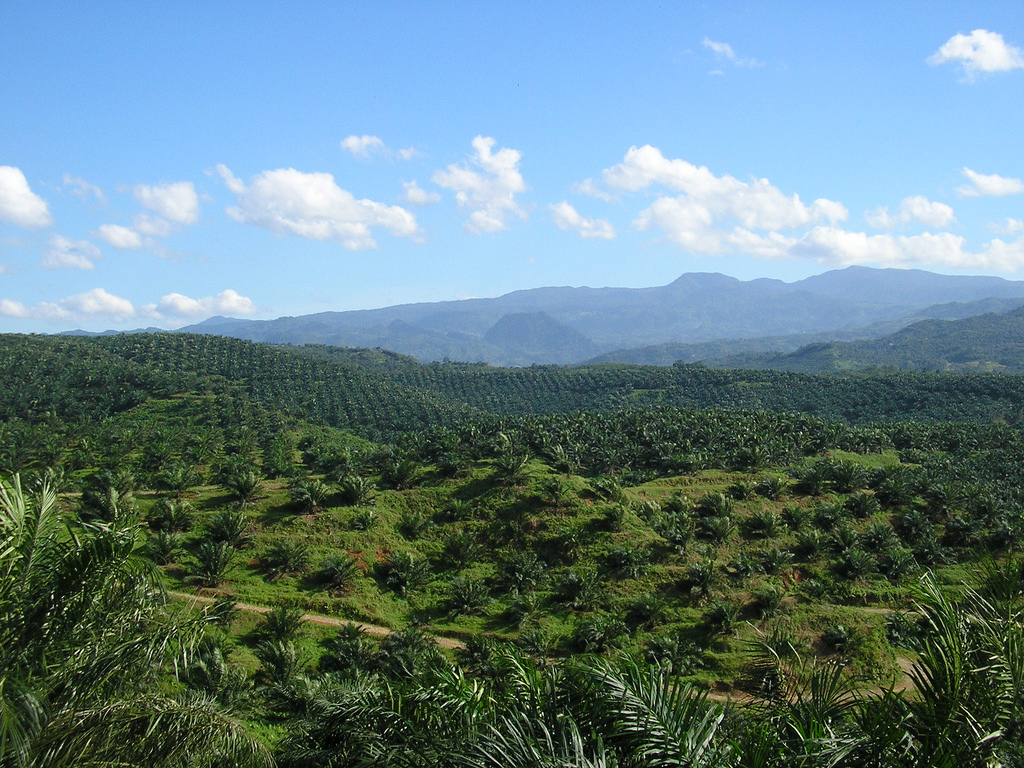
A palm oil plantation in Indonesia

Indonesia is the world's largest producer of palm oil, producing 44 million tonnes in 2023–24.

=== Malaysia ===
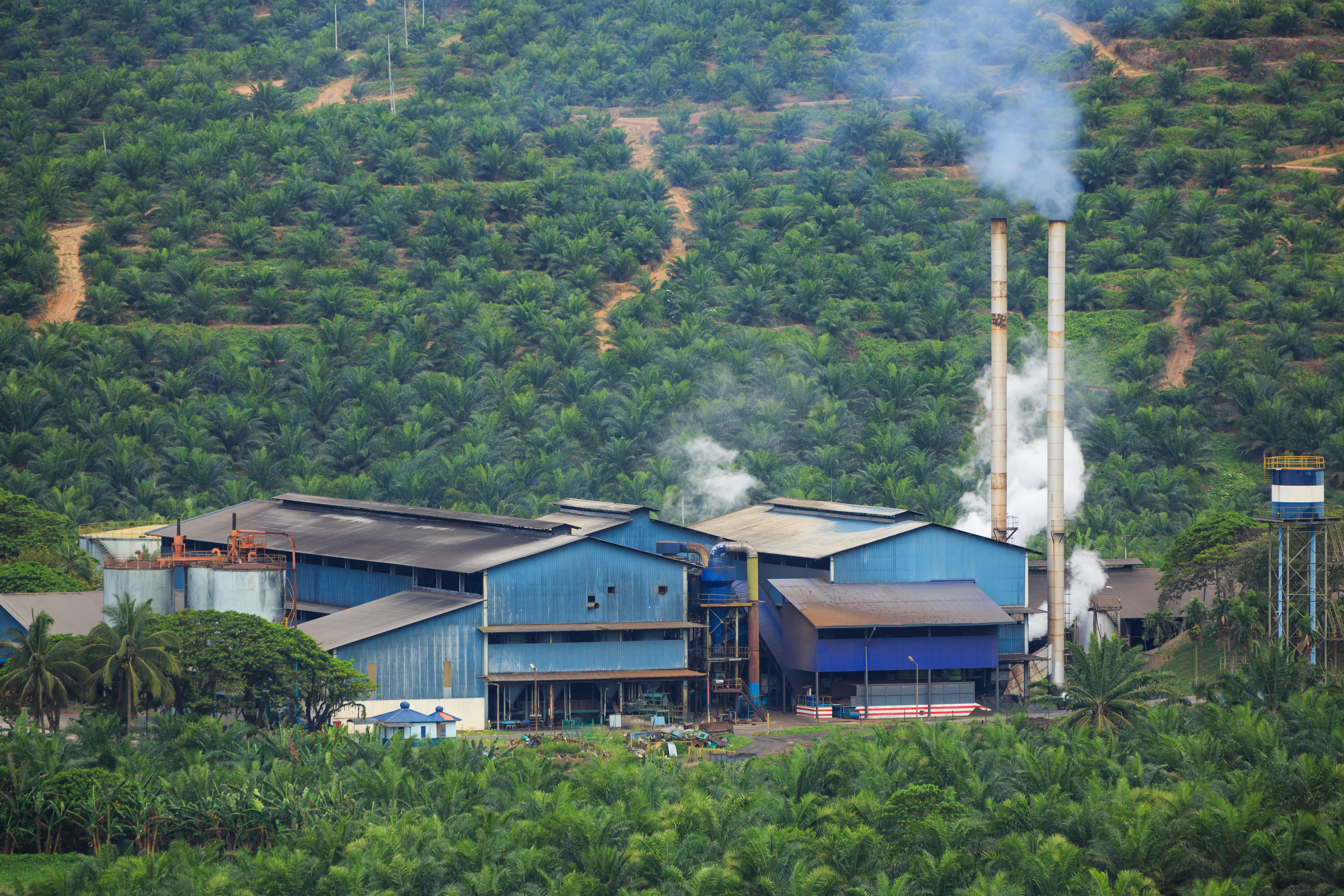
A palm oil mill located on a palm oil plantation in Malaysia

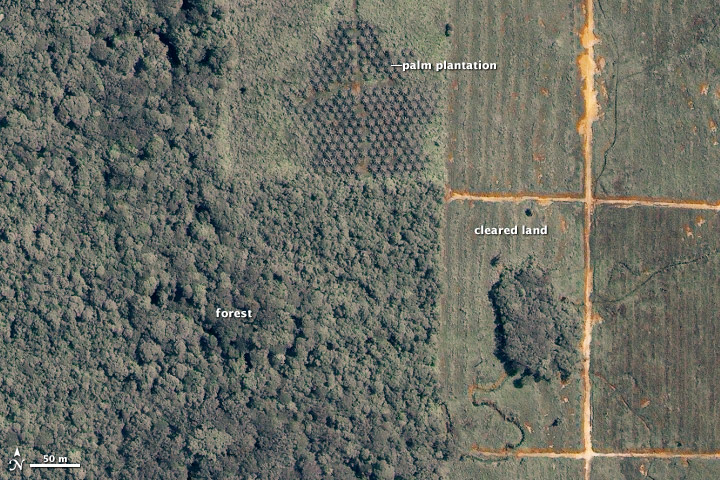
A satellite image showing deforestation in Malaysian Borneo to allow the plantation of oil palm

Malaysia is the world's second-largest producer of palm oil, producing 19.7 million tonnes in 2023–24.

In 1992, in response to concerns about deforestation, the Government of Malaysia pledged to limit the expansion of palm oil plantations by retaining a minimum of half the nation's land as forest cover.

=== Nigeria ===
As of 2023–24, Nigeria was the fifth-largest producer, with 1.5 million tonnes. Both small- and large-scale producers participate in the industry. In much of the Niger Delta, palm oil is commonoly referred to as "red oil" (or red gold) to distinguish it from the "black oil" (crude oil) which dominates production.

=== Thailand ===
Thailand is the world's third-largest producer of crude palm oil, producing 3.6 million tonnes in 2023–24. Nearly all of Thai production is consumed locally. Almost 85% of palm plantations and extraction mills are in south Thailand. At year-end 2016, 4.7 to 5.8 million rai (750,000 to 930,000 hectares; 1,900,000 to 2,300,000 acres) were planted in oil palms, employing 300,000 farmers, mostly on small landholdings of 20 rai (3.2 hectares; 7.9 acres). ASEAN as a region accounts for 52.5 million metric tons (57.9 million short tons) of palm oil production, about 85% of the world total and more than 90% of global exports. Indonesia accounts for 52% of world exports. Malaysian exports total 38%. The biggest consumers of palm oil are India, the European Union, and China, with the three consuming nearly 50% of world exports. Thailand's Department of Internal Trade (DIT) usually sets the price of crude palm oil and refined palm oil Thai farmers have a relatively low yield compared to those in Malaysia and Indonesia. Thai palm oil crops yield 4–17% oil compared to around 20% in competing countries. In addition, Indonesian and Malaysian oil palm plantations are 10 times the size of Thai plantations.

=== Benin ===
Palm is native to the wetlands of western Africa, and south Benin hosts many palm plantations. Its 'Agricultural Revival Programme' has identified many thousands of hectares of land as suitable for new oil palm export plantations. Non-governmental organisations (NGOs), such as Nature Tropicale, claim biofuels will compete with domestic food production in some existing prime agricultural sites. Other areas comprise peat land, whose drainage would have a deleterious environmental impact. There is also concern that genetically modified plants will be introduced into the region, jeopardizing the current premium paid for their non-GM crops.

According to recent article by National Geographic, most palm oil in Benin is still produced by women for domestic use. The FAO additionally states that peasants in Benin practice agroecology. They harvest palm fruit from small farms and the palm oil is mostly used for local consumption.

=== Cameroon ===
Cameroon had a production project underway initiated by Herakles Farms in the United States. However, the project was halted under the pressure of civil society organizations in Cameroon. Before the project was halted, Herakles left the Roundtable on Sustainable Palm Oil early in negotiations. The project has been controversial due to opposition from villagers and the location of the project in a sensitive region for biodiversity.

=== Colombia ===
In 2018, total palm oil production in Colombia reached 1.6 million metric tons (1.8 million short tons), representing some 8% of national agricultural GDP and benefiting mainly smallholders (65% of Colombia's palm oil sector). According to a study from the Environmental, Science and Policy, Colombia has the potential to produce sustainable palm oil without causing deforestation. In addition, palm oil and other crops provide a productive alternative for illegal crops, like coca.

=== Ecuador ===
Ecuador aims to help palm oil producers switch to sustainable methods and achieve RSPO certification under initiatives to develop greener industries.

=== Ghana ===
Ghana has a lot of palm nut species, which may become an important contributor to the agriculture of the region. Although Ghana has multiple palm species, ranging from local palm nuts to other species locally called agric, it was only marketed locally and to neighboring countries. Production is now expanding as major investment funds are purchasing plantations because Ghana is considered a major growth area for palm oil.

=== Kenya ===
Kenya's domestic production of edible oils covers about a third of its annual demand, estimated at 380,000 metric tons (420,000 short tons). The rest is imported at a cost of around US$140 million a year, making edible oil the country's second most important import after petroleum. Since 1993 a new hybrid variety of cold-tolerant, high-yielding oil palm has been promoted by the Food and Agriculture Organization of the United Nations in western Kenya. As well as alleviating the country's deficit of edible oils while providing an important cash crop, it is claimed to have environmental benefits in the region, because it does not compete against food crops or native vegetation and it provides stabilisation for the soil.

=== Myanmar ===
Palm oil was introduced to British Burma (now Myanmar) in the 1920s. Beginning in the 1970s, smaller-scale palm oil plantations were developed in Tanintharyi Region, and Mon, Kayin, and Rakhine States. In 1999, the ruling military junta, the State Peace and Development Council, initiated the large-scale development of such plantations, especially in Tanintharyi, the southernmost region of Myanmar. As of 2019, over 401,814 ha of palm oil concessions have been awarded to 44 companies. 60% of the awarded concessions consist of forests and native vegetation, and some concessions overlap with national parks, including Tanintharyi and Lenya National Parks, which have seen deforestation and threaten conservation efforts for endemic species like the Indochinese tiger.

== Markets ==
Palm oil is one of the most commonly produced vegetable oils

According to the Hamburg-based Oil World trade journal, in 2008 global production of oils and fats stood at 160 million tonnes. Palm oil and palm kernel oil were jointly the largest contributor, accounting for 48 million tonnes, or 30% of the total output. Soybean oil came in second with 37 million tonnes (23%). About 38% of the oils and fats produced in the world were shipped across oceans. Of the 60 million tonnes of oils and fats exported around the world, palm oil and palm kernel oil made up close to 60%; Malaysia, with 45% of the market share, dominated the palm oil trade. Production of palm oil that complies with voluntary sustainability standards is growing at a faster rate than conventional production. Standard-compliant production increased by 110% from 2008 to 2016, while conventional production increased by 2%. The production of vegetable oils as a whole went up 125% between 2000 and 2020, driven by a sharp increase in palm oil.

=== Food label regulations ===
Previously, palm oil could be listed as "vegetable fat" or "vegetable oil" on food labels in the European Union (EU). From December 2014, food packaging in the EU is no longer allowed to use the generic terms "vegetable fat" or "vegetable oil" in the ingredients list. Food producers are required to list the specific type of vegetable fat used, including palm oil. Vegetable oils and fats can be grouped together in the ingredients list under the term "vegetable oils" or "vegetable fats" but this must be followed by the type of vegetable origin (e.g., palm, sunflower, or rapeseed) and the phrase "in varying proportions".

In Malaysia, it is illegal to label products in ways that discriminate against palm oil. Offenders can be fined up to RM250,000 or sent to prison for up to five years. One convenience store was raided for selling "no palm oil" ice cream, with all products seized.

=== Supply chain institutions ===
==== Consumer Goods Forum ====
In 2010, the Consumer Goods Forum passed a resolution that its members would reduce deforestation to net zero by 2020. They planned to do this through sustainable production of several commodities, including palm oil. As of 2023 that goal has not been met.

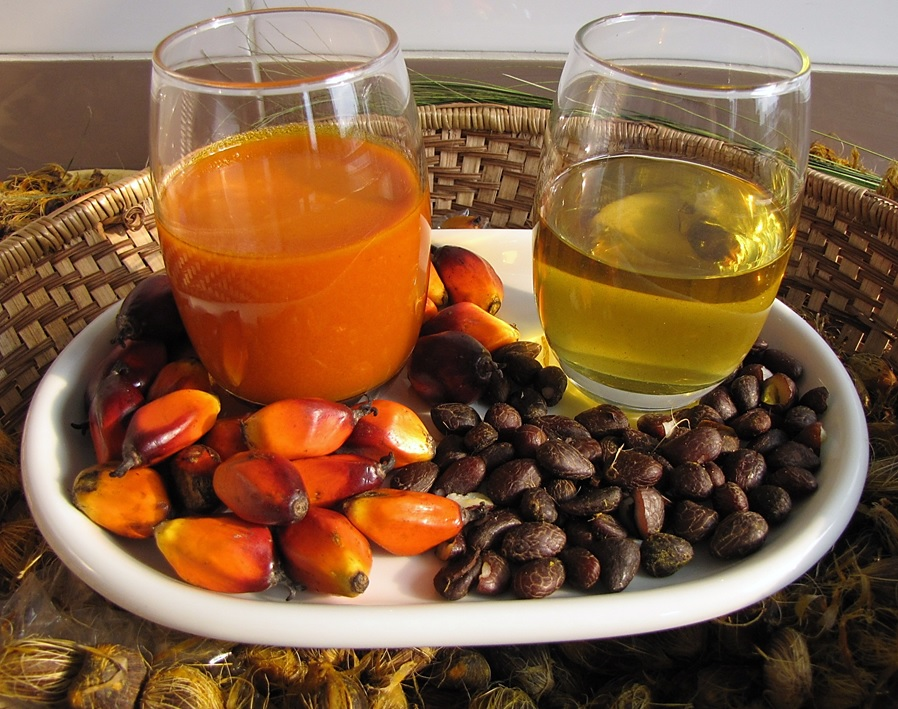
Left, reddish palm oil made from the pulp of oil palm fruit. Right, clear palm kernel oil made from the kernels

==== Roundtable on Sustainable Palm Oil (RSPO) ====
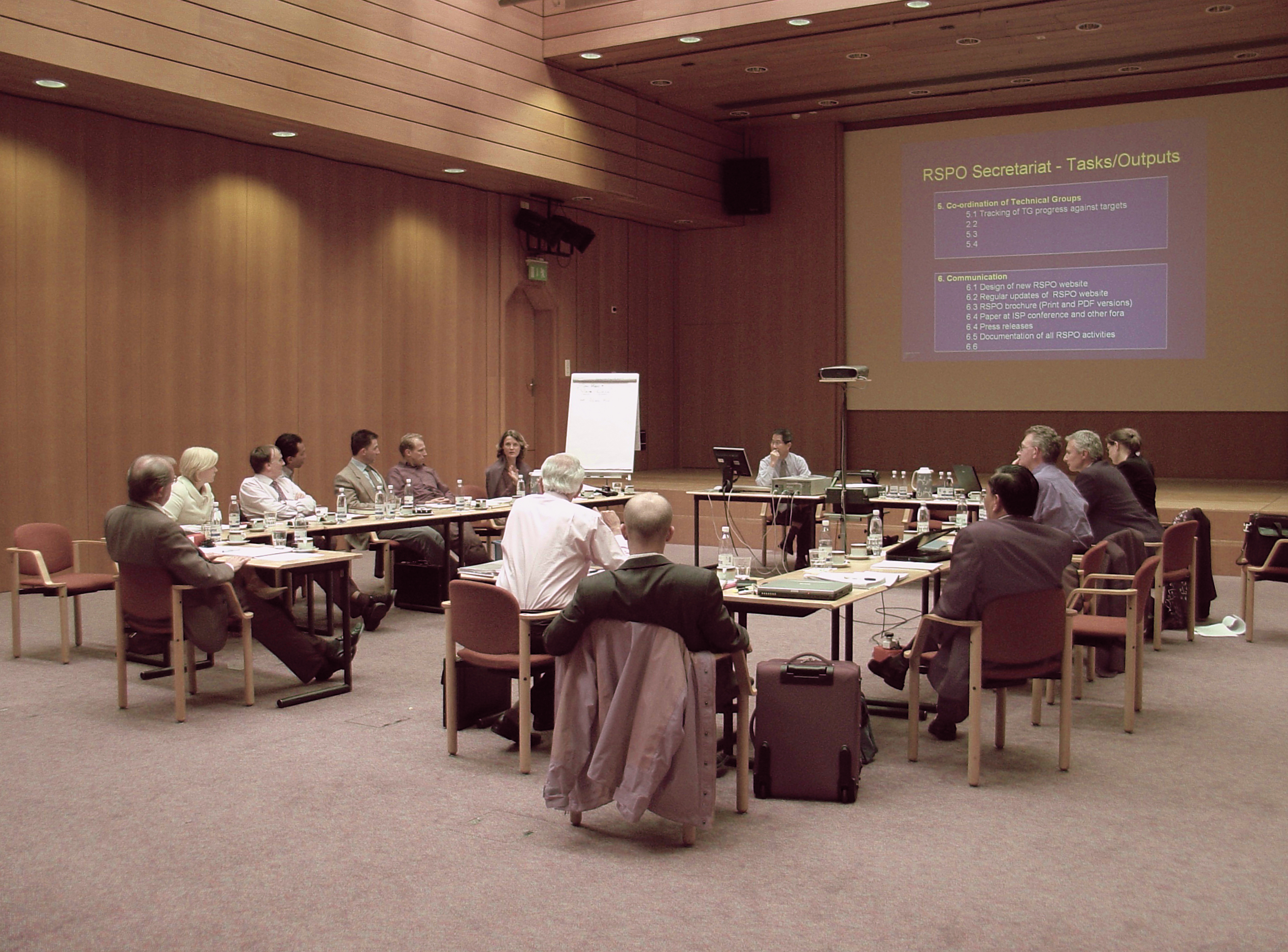
Roundtable No 2 (RT2) in Zürich in 2005

The Roundtable on Sustainable Palm Oil (RSPO) was established in 2004 with the objective of promoting the growth and use of sustainable palm oil products through global standards and multistakeholder governance. The seat of the association is in Zürich, Switzerland, while the secretariat is currently based in Kuala Lumpur, with a satellite office in Jakarta. RSPO currently has 5,650 members from 94 countries. These members include palm oil producers, manufacturers who use palm oil in their products, and some environmental groups.

The RSPO was established following concerns raised by non-governmental organizations about environmental impacts resulting from palm oil production.

51,999,404 tonnes of palm oil fruit produced in 2016 was RSPO certified. Products containing Certified Sustainable Palm Oil (CSPO) can carry the RSPO trademark. In 2014, Indonesia accounted for 40% of global palm oil production and 44% of the total RSPO-certified areas.

After the meeting in 2009, a number of environmental organisations were critical of the scope of the agreements reached. Palm oil growers who produce CSPO have been critical of the organization because, though they have met RSPO standards and assumed the costs associated with certification, the market demand for certified palm oil remains low. Even though deforestation has decreased in RSPO-certified oil palm plantations, peatlands continue to be drained and burned for the creation of new RSPO-certified palm plantations. Additionally, no mention to well-documented health effects of palm oil is made by the organization.

In 2019, RSPO launched the Independent Smallholder Standard (ISH). By simplifying documentation and cost requirements, it expanded the RSPO system to smallholder farmers not affiliated with large corporations or cooperatives.This enhanced smallholder management awareness and skills, improved sustainable palm oil market opportunities, and enhanced palm oil community development and income.

== Processing ==
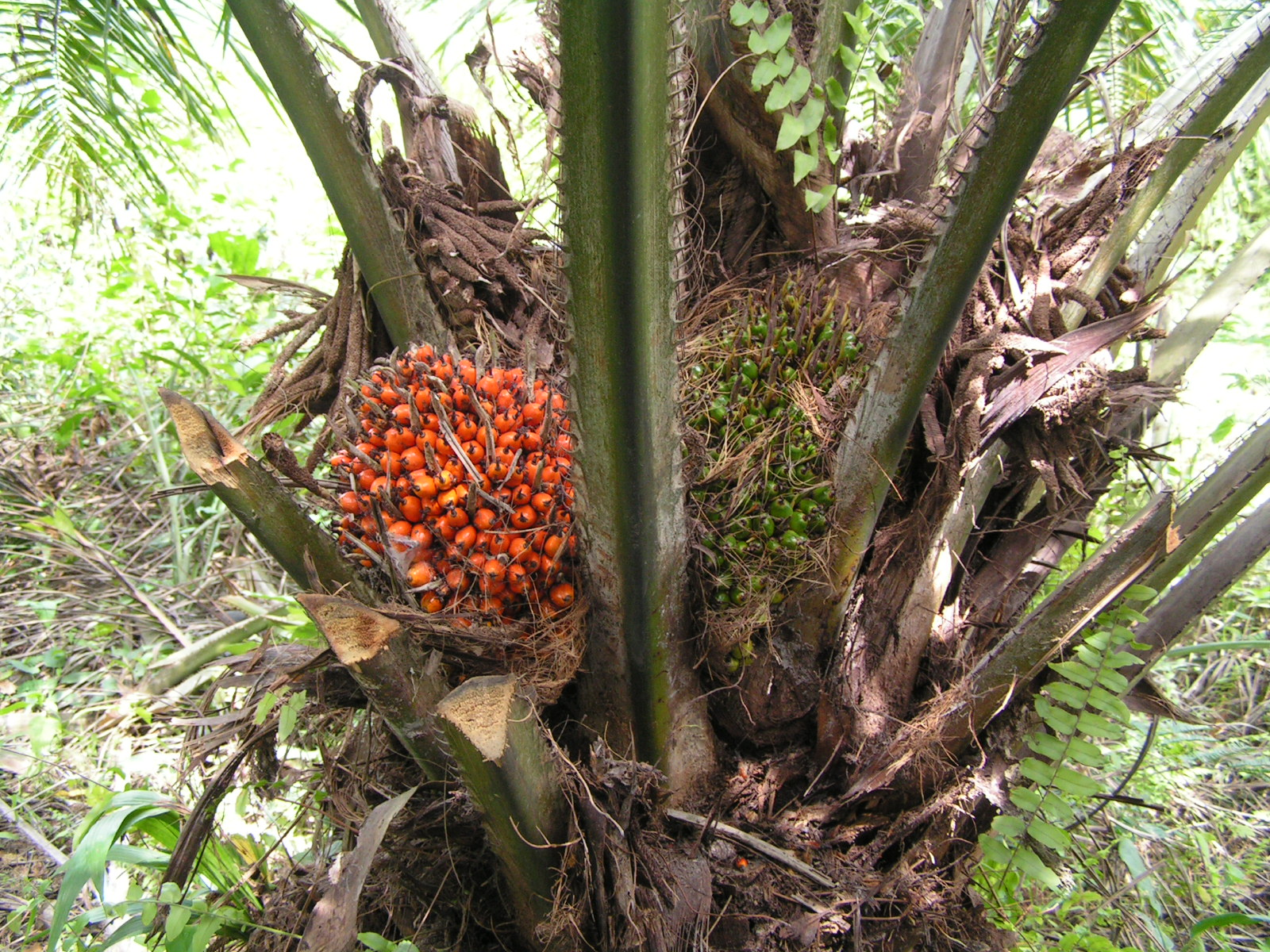
Oil palm fruits on the tree

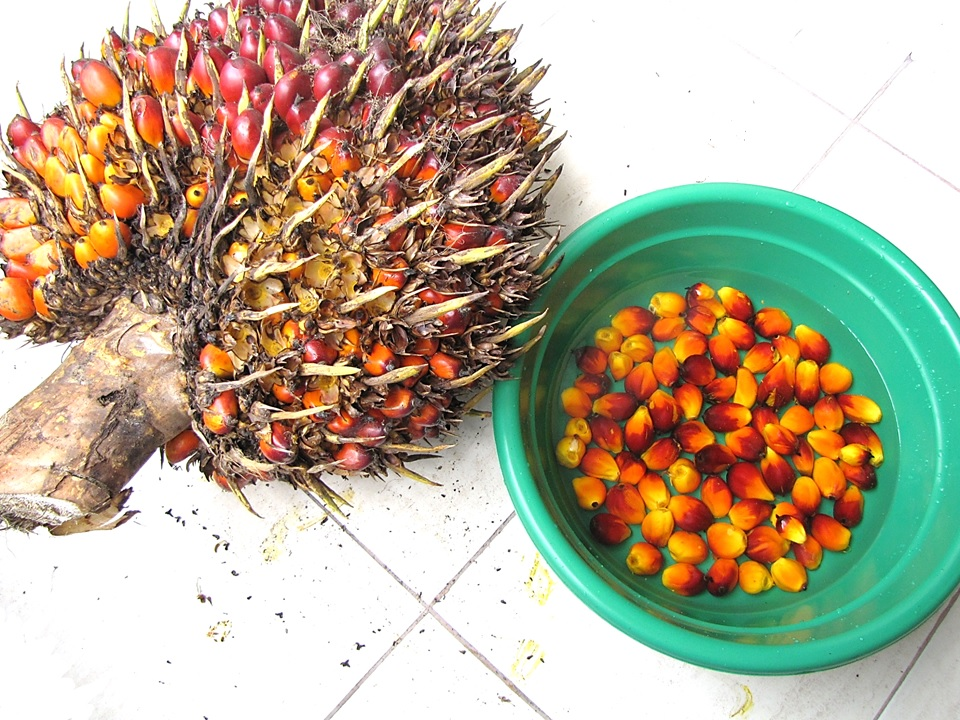
An oil palm stem, weighing about 10 kg, with some of its fruits picked

Palm oil is naturally reddish in color because of a high beta-carotene content. It is not to be confused with palm kernel oil derived from the kernel of the same fruit or coconut oil derived from the kernel of the coconut palm (Cocos nucifera). The differences are in color (raw palm kernel oil lacks carotenoids and is not red), and in saturated fat content: palm mesocarp oil is 49% saturated, while palm kernel oil and coconut oil are 81% and 86% saturated fats, respectively. However, crude red palm oil that has been refined, neutralized, bleached and deodorized, a common commodity called RBD (refined, bleached, and deodorized) palm oil, does not contain carotenoids. Many industrial food applications of palm oil use fractionated components of palm oil (often listed as "modified palm oil") whose saturation levels can reach 90%; these "modified" palm oils can become highly saturated, but are not necessarily hydrogenated.

The oil palm produces bunches containing many fruits with the fleshy mesocarp enclosing a kernel that is covered by a very hard shell. The FAO considers palm oil (coming from the pulp) and palm kernels to be primary products. The oil extraction rate from a bunch varies from 17 to 27% for palm oil, and from 4 to 10% for palm kernels.

Along with coconut oil, palm oil is one of the few highly saturated vegetable fats and is semisolid at room temperature. Palm oil is a common cooking ingredient in the tropical belt of Africa, Southeast Asia and parts of Brazil. Its use in the commercial food industry in other parts of the world is widespread because of its lower cost and the high oxidative stability (saturation) of the refined product when used for frying. One source reported that humans consumed an average 17 pounds (7.7 kg) of palm oil per person in 2015.

=== Extraction ===
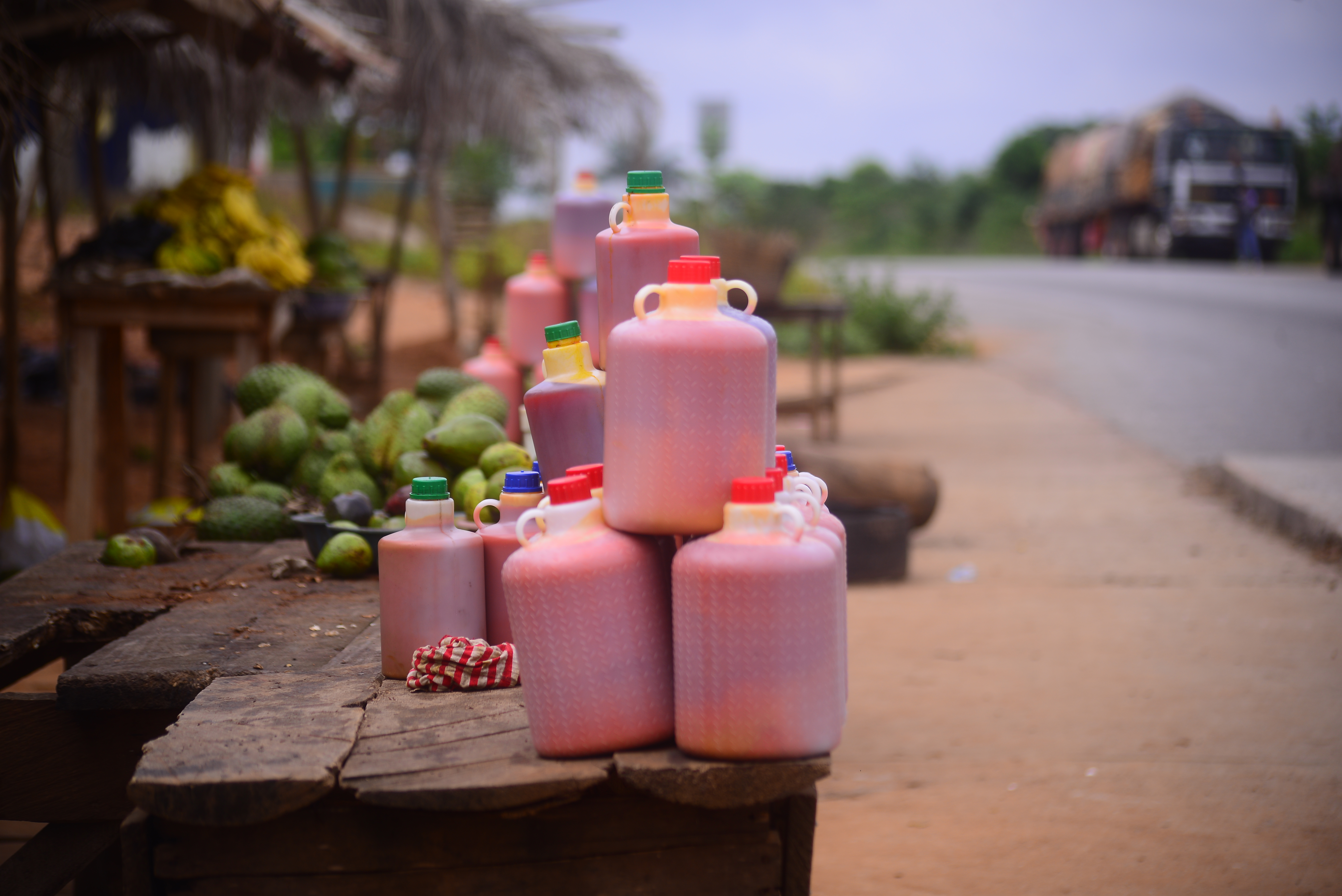
Red palm oil being sold on the roadside in plastic bottles in Ghana. Artisanal production of palm oil is common there, providing a key staple food stuff in most traditional cooking.

Palm oil is traditionally, and still industrially, produced by milling the fruits of oil palm.

Besides milling, palm oil is produced by cold-pressing the fruit of the oil palm since the 1990s. This type of artisanal palm oil is usually not further refined, so it keeps the natural red color. It is bottled for use as a cooking oil, in addition to other uses such as being blended into mayonnaise and vegetable oil.

The result of milling or cold-pressing is a mixture of water, crude palm oil, and fibers from the palm fruit. A minimum degree of processing is required to obtain the oil. The mixture is first passed through a filter to remove the solids, then separated by density to remove the water. Density treatment can also act as a basic form of degumming, provided that the fruit is steamed before milling to hydrolyze the gum, at a cost of also losing some triglycerides to hydrolysis.

The result of basic processing is called a "crude palm oil" or a "red palm oil", referring to its intense color due to the high carotenoid content. Red palm oil is a traditional cooking oil in West Africa. The free fatty acids within provide a "bite" to the flavor. The triglyceride part is around 50% saturated fat—considerably less than palm kernel oil—and 40% monounsaturated fat and 10% polyunsaturated fat. It is a source of Vitamin A and Vitamin E.

=== Refining ===
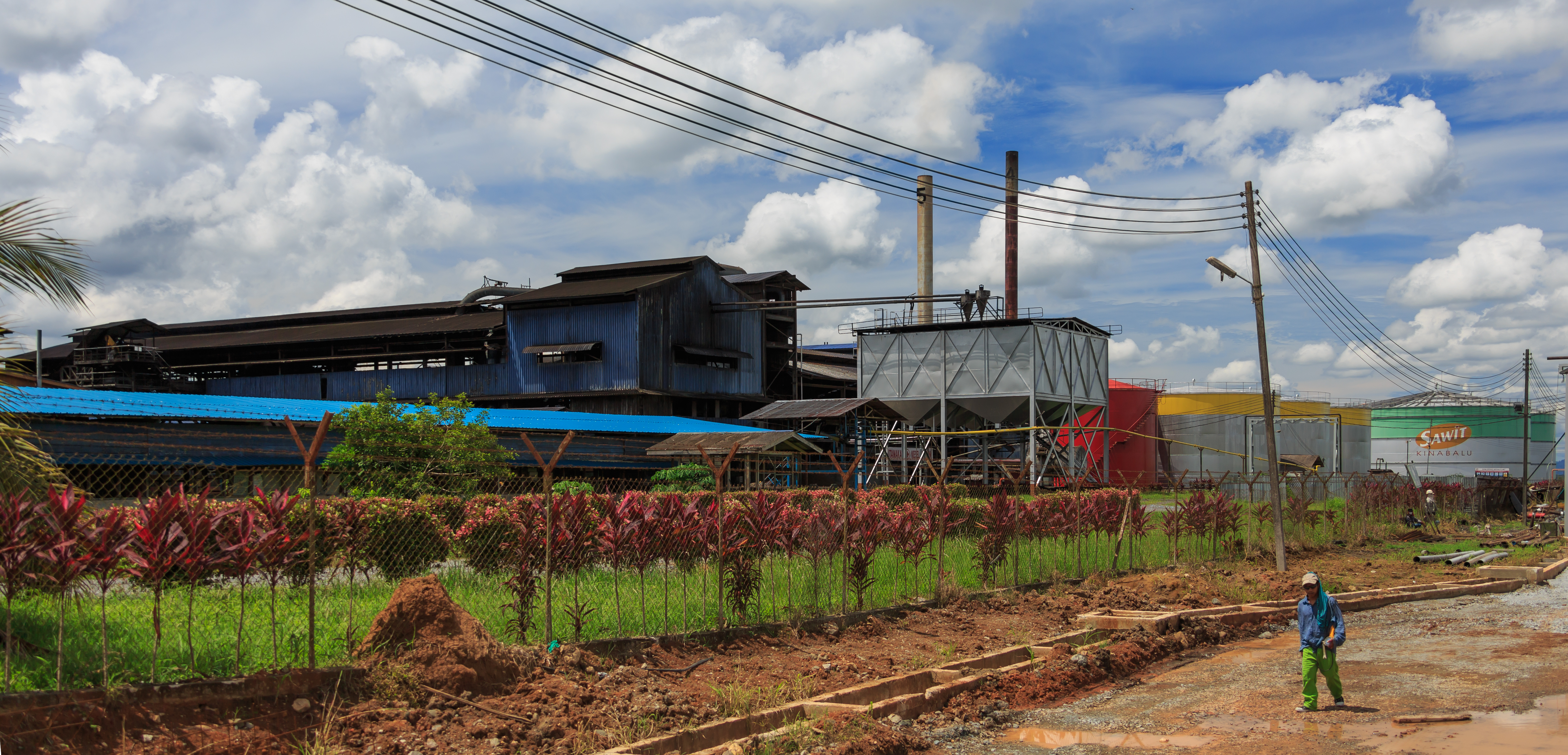
A worker walking near the border of an oil mill in Malaysia. Palm oil production is an important part of economies in many parts of rural Malaysia, but is also a source of environmental conflict.

Crude PO can be refined to remove its non-triglyceride components.

1. Bleaching removes color from the oil. This is achieved by adding a clay absorbent called bleaching earth in a vacuum mixer.
2. Filters remove the clay from the oil.
3. The oil enters the deodorizer, which is responsible for removing free fatty acids (FFA) generated by hydrolysis. One type of deodorizer works by distillating out the FFAs using a set of different temperatures. The FFA is collected as "palm fatty acid distillate" (PFAD). PFAD is itself a valuable product used in the manufacture of soaps, washing powder and other products.
4. The final, refined oil is called "refined, bleached and deodorized palm oil" (RBD PO). RBD PO is the basic palm oil sold on the world's commodity markets.

RBD PO is also known as white palm oil. It can be further fractionated using the different melting points of its components. The part with a higher melting point, which crystalizes out as a solid earlier, is called palm stearin. It consists of mostly saturated fats. The remaining liquid part is called palm olein. It is also possible to fractionate at a different point of processing, even with crude palm oil.

RBD PO, or "palm shortening", is extensively used in food manufacture. It is valued for its low polyunsaturated fat content, which offers high stability against rancidity and allows it to replace hydrogenated fats in a variety of baked and fried products.

== Nutrition, composition and health ==
Palm oil is a food staple in many cuisines, contributing significant calories and plant lipids. Globally, humans consumed an average of 7.7 kg (17 lb) of palm oil per person in 2015. Although the relationship of palm oil consumption to disease risk has been previously assessed, the quality of the clinical research specifically assessing palm oil effects has been generally poor. Consequently, research has focused on the deleterious effects of palm oil and palmitic acid consumption as sources of saturated fat content in edible oils, leading to conclusions that palm oil and saturated fats should be replaced with polyunsaturated fats in the diet.

A 2015 meta-analysis and 2017 advisory from the American Heart Association indicated that palm oil is among foods supplying dietary saturated fat which increases blood levels of LDL cholesterol and increases the risk of cardiovascular diseases, leading to recommendations for reduced use or elimination of dietary palm oil in favor of consuming unhydrogenated vegetable oils. The British National Health Service provided a 2023 guideline recommending that palm oil foods be replaced by those made with unsaturated fats. A 2019 meta-analysis found no association between total fat, saturated fatty acids, monounsaturated fatty acid, and polyunsaturated fatty acid intake with risk of cardiovascular disease.

Glycidyl fatty acid esters (GE), 3-MCPD and 2-MCPD, are found especially in palm oils and palm fats because of their refining at high temperatures (approx. 200 °C (392 °F)). Since glycidol, the parent compound of GE, is considered genotoxic and carcinogenic, the EFSA did not set a safe level for GE. According to the chair of the CONTAM (EFSA's expert Panel on Contaminants in the Food Chain), "The exposure to GE of babies consuming solely infant formula is a particular concern as this is up to ten times what would be considered of low concern for public health". The EFSA's tolerable daily intake (TDI) of 3-MCPD and its fatty acid esters was set to 0.8 micrograms per kilogram of body weight per day (μg/kg bw/day) in 2016 and increased to 2 μg/kg bw/day in 2017, based on evidence linking this substance to organ damage in animal tests and on possible adverse effects on the kidney and on male fertility. According to the EFSA, there is not enough data to set a safe level for 2-MCPD. As of December 2022, the Malaysian Palm Oil Board issued an amendment to its palm oil licensing conditions to include maximum limits of 1.25 ppm and 1 ppm, respectively, to the amount of 3-MCPDE and GE that can be found in processed palm oil.

=== Key components ===
==== Fatty acids ====
Palm oil, like all fats, is composed of fatty acids, esterified with glycerol. Palm oil has an unusually high concentration of saturated fat, specifically the 16-carbon saturated fatty acid, palmitic acid, to which it gives its name. Monounsaturated oleic acid is also a major constituent of palm oil. Unrefined palm oil is a significant source of tocotrienol, part of the vitamin E family.

The linoleic acid content of palm oil is about 6.4–15%.

The approximate concentration of esterified fatty acids in palm oil is:

Fatty acid content of palm oil (present as triglyceride esters)
Type of fatty acid	Fraction
Myristic saturated C14	1.0%
Palmitic saturated C16	43.5%
Stearic saturated C18	4.3%
Oleic monounsaturated C18:1	36.6%
Linoleic polyunsaturated C18:2	9.1%
Other/unknown	5.5%
black: saturated grey: monounsaturated blue: polyunsaturated

==== Carotenes ====
Red palm oil is rich in carotenes, such as alpha-carotene, beta-carotene and lycopene, which give it a characteristic dark red color. However, palm oil that has been refined, bleached and deodorized from crude palm oil (called "RBD palm oil") does not contain carotenes.

==== Palmitic acid ====
Excessive intake of palmitic acid, which makes up 44% of palm oil, increases blood levels of low-density lipoprotein (LDL) and total cholesterol, and so increases risk of cardiovascular diseases. Other reviews, the World Health Organization, and the US National Heart, Lung and Blood Institute have encouraged consumers to limit the consumption of palm oil, palmitic acid and foods high in saturated fat.

== Social and environmental impact ==
Forests have been cleared in parts of Indonesia and Malaysia to make space for oil-palm monoculture. This has significant impacts on the local ecosystems leading to deforestation and biodiversity loss. For example, these processes have resulted in significant acreage losses of the natural habitat of the three surviving species of orangutan. One species in particular, the Sumatran orangutan, has been listed as critically endangered because of habitat loss due to palm oil cultivation.

=== Social ===
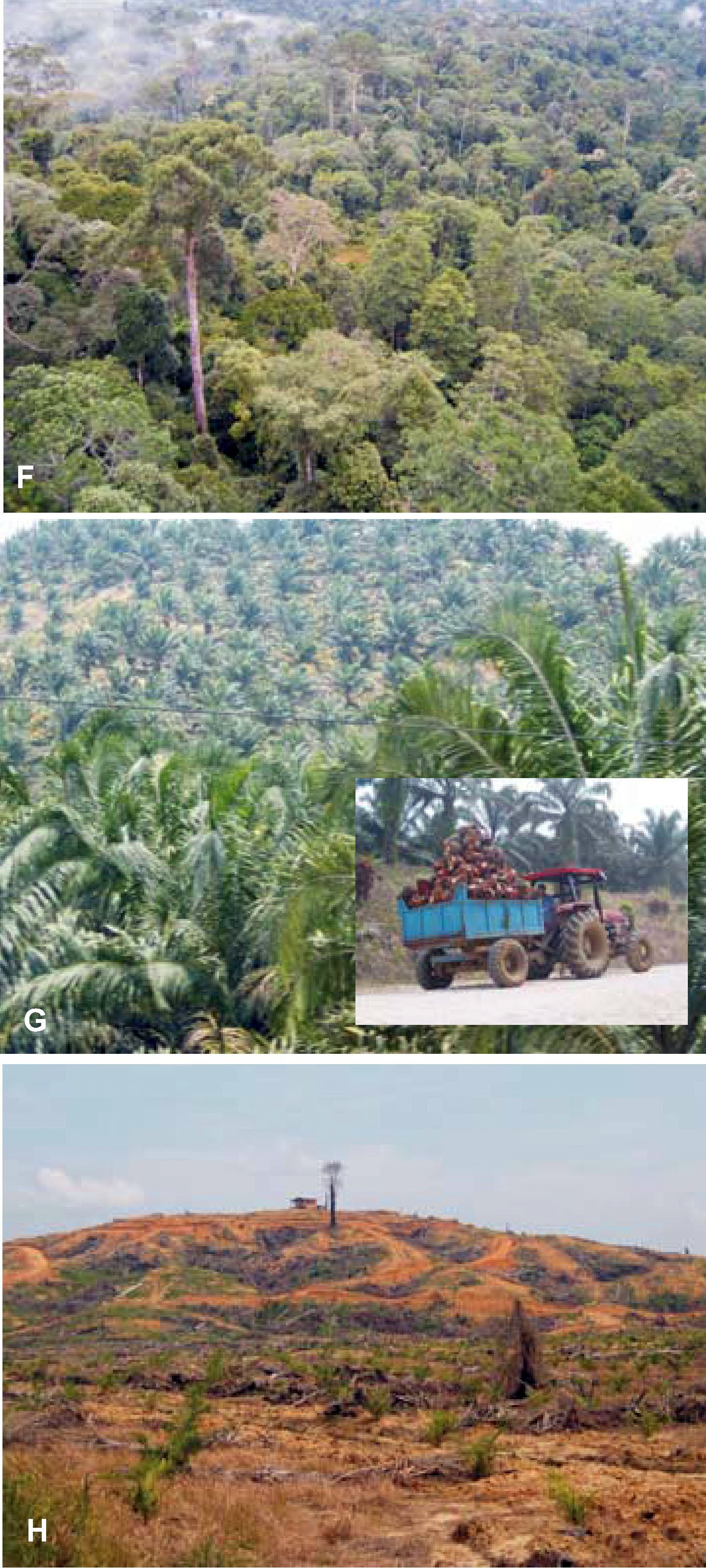
In Borneo, the forest (F), is being replaced by oil palm plantations (G). These changes are irreversible for all practical purposes (H).

In addition to environmental concerns, palm oil development in specific regions that produce it has also led to significant social conflict. Journalists and NGO researchers have found that regions with fast growing palm oil production have experienced significant violations of indigenous tribe land rights, human trafficking, sexual abuses, and other related human rights violations.

The palm oil industry has had both positive and negative impacts on workers, indigenous peoples, and residents of palm oil producing communities. Palm oil production provides employment opportunities, and has been shown to improve infrastructure, social services and also help reduce poverty. However, in some cases, oil palm plantations have developed lands without consultation or compensation of the indigenous people inhabiting the land, resulting in social conflict. The use of illegal immigrants in Malaysia has also raised concerns about working conditions within the palm oil industry.

Some social initiatives use palm oil cultivation as part of poverty alleviation strategies. Examples include the UN Food and Agriculture Organisation's hybrid oil palm project in Western Kenya, which improves incomes and diets of local populations, and Malaysia's Federal Land Development Authority and Federal Land Consolidation and Rehabilitation Authority, which both support rural development.

==== Food vs. fuel ====
The use of palm oil in the production of biodiesel has led to concerns that the need for fuel is being placed ahead of the need for food, leading to malnutrition in developing nations. This is known as the food versus fuel debate. According to a 2008 report published in the Renewable and Sustainable Energy Reviews, palm oil was determined to be a sustainable source of both food and biofuel, and the production of palm oil biodiesel does not pose a threat to edible palm oil supplies. According to a 2009 study published in the Environmental Science and Policy journal, palm oil biodiesel might increase the demand for palm oil in the future, resulting in the expansion of palm oil production, and therefore an increased supply of food.

==== Human rights abuses ====
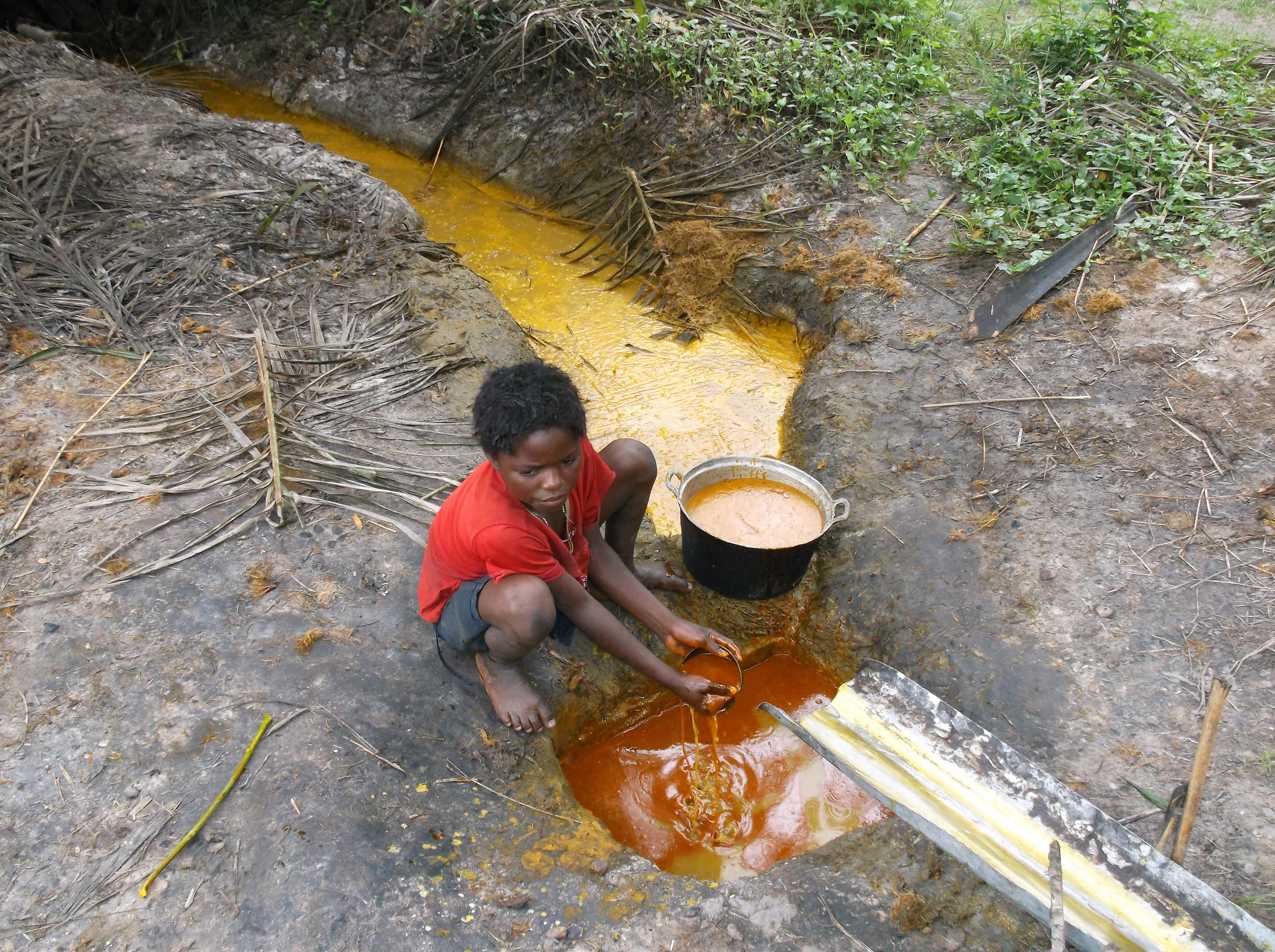
The palm oil industry has a history of violating labor-related human rights, indigenous territorial right and environmental rights of communities in the contexts where the industry is prominent. Child labor violations are common in smallholder farming in many of the post-colonial contexts (such as Africa) in which palm oil is produced.

One report indicated numerous allegations of human rights abuses in the production of palm oil in Indonesia and Malaysia, including exposure to hazardous pesticides, child labor, rape and sexual abuse, and unsafe carrying loads, among other human rights violations. These incidents may receive no response by the company, police, or other law enforcement group, or are left unreported because victims fear retaliation from their abuser. Pesticides used by palm oil plantations include paraquat, which has been banned in Europe over links to Parkinson's disease, and glyphosate, which has been involved in a US class-action lawsuit regarding cancer (the European Chemicals Agency (ECHA) classified glyphosate as causing serious eye damage but did not find evidence implicating it as a carcinogen).

Reports of indigenous peoples and communities in Indonesia, indicate losing farmland and traditionally significant land due to palm oil industry expansion. In 2017, there were over 650 different land disputes between palm oil plantations and indigenous landowners. Indigenous communities also expressed concern over the loss of natural resources, such as wild rubber, reed, and adat forests (communal forests). Indigenous communities have made some ground when it comes to land disputes, either through protest or legal means.

Other concerns when it comes to indigenous communities being impacted include lack of government oversight on palm oil plantations, political corruption, or the lack of enforcement of laws meant to protect indigenous lands. In countries such as Guatemala, palm oil plantations have significant leverage within the local justice system, leading local police to disregard land claims, going as far as using force to break up protests, and even murdering local leaders.

=== Environmental ===
While only 5% of the world's vegetable oil farmland is used for palm plantations, palm cultivation produces 38% of the world's total vegetable oil supply. In terms of oil yield, a palm plantation is 10 times more productive than soybean, sunflower or rapeseed cultivation because the palm fruit and kernel both provide usable oil. Palm oil has garnered criticism from environmentalists due to the environmental importance of where it is grown. However, it is indisputably more efficient in comparison to other oil-producing plants. In 2016, it was found that palm oil farms produce around 4.17 metric tons of oil per hectare. By contrast other oils, such as sunflower, soybean, or peanut only produce 0.56, 0.39, and 0.16 metric tons respectively per hectare. Palm oil is the most sustainable vegetable oil in terms of yield, requiring one-ninth of land used by other vegetable oil crops. In the future, laboratory-grown microbes like torula oil might achieve higher yields per unit of land at comparable prices.

However, palm oil cultivation has been criticized for its impact on the natural environment, including deforestation, loss of natural habitats, and greenhouse gas emissions which have threatened critically endangered species, such as the orangutan and Sumatran tiger. Slash-and-burn techniques are still used to create new plantations across palm oil producing countries. From January to September 2019, 857,000 hectares of land was burned in Indonesia; peatlands accounted for more than a quarter of the burned area. The widespread deforestation and other environmental destruction in Indonesia, much of which is caused by palm oil production has often been described by academics as an ecocide.

Furthermore, a study of palm oil in Cameroon showed that land occupied by palm oil plantations can reduce ecosystem quality by 30–45% compared to the potential natural vegetation state. This land use change also creates a carbon debt, which can take approximately 45–53 years to offset greenhouse gas emissions reductions.

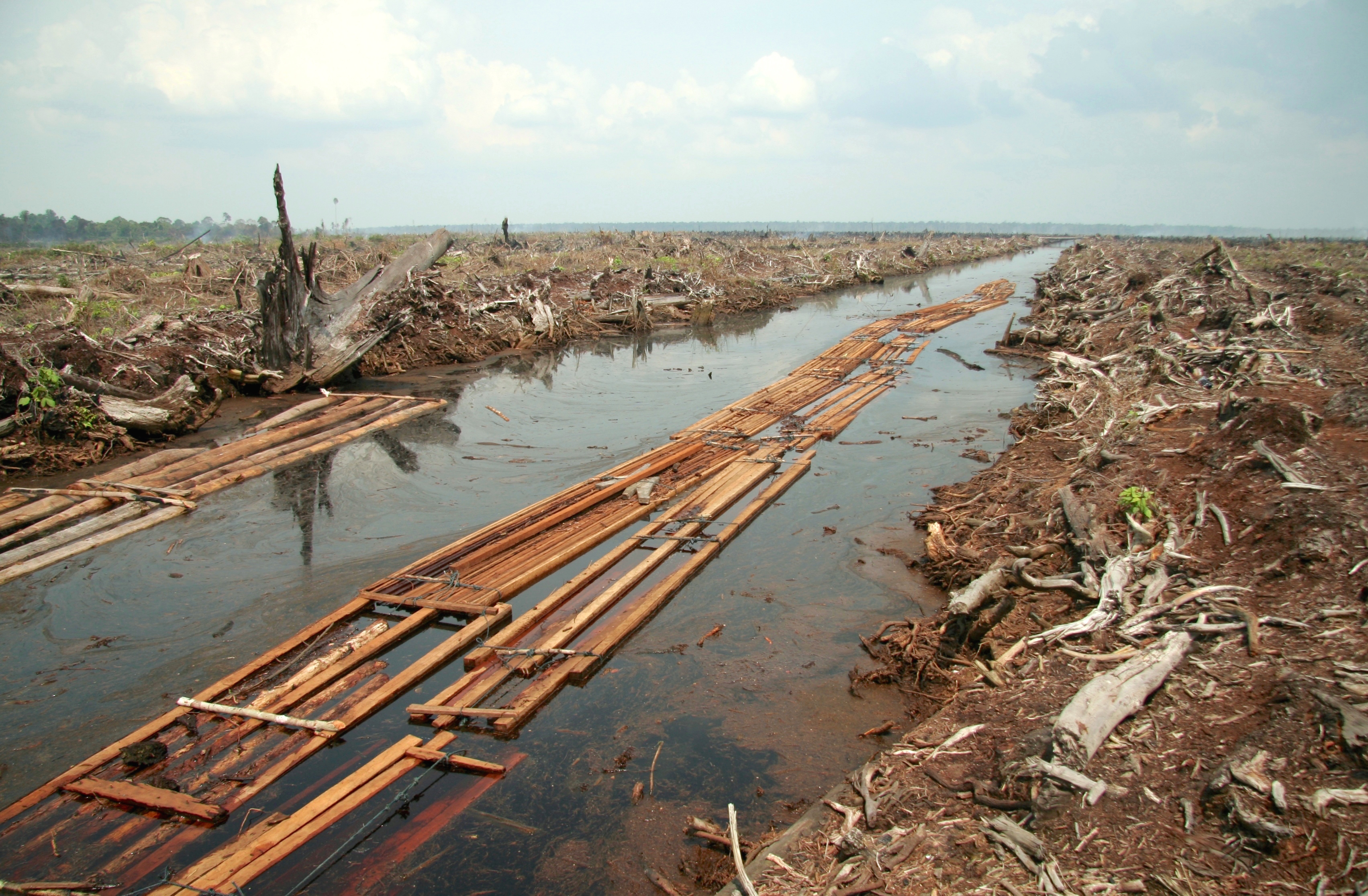
Deforestation in Indonesia, to make way for an oil palm plantation

Environmental groups such as Greenpeace and Friends of the Earth oppose the use of palm oil biofuels, claiming that the deforestation caused by oil palm plantations is more damaging for the climate than the benefits gained by switching to biofuel and using the palms as carbon sinks.

A 2018 study by the International Union for Conservation of Nature (IUCN) concluded that palm oil is "here to stay" due to its higher productivity compared with many other vegetable oils. The IUCN maintains that replacing palm oil with other vegetable oils would necessitate greater amounts of agricultural land, negatively affecting biodiversity. The IUCN advocates better practices in the palm oil industry, including the prevention of plantations from expanding into forested regions and creating a demand for certified and sustainable palm oil products.

In 2019, the Rainforest Action Network surveyed eight global brands involved in palm oil extraction in the Leuser Ecosystem, and said that none was performing adequately in avoiding "conflict palm oil". Many of the companies told The Guardian they were working to improve their performance. A WWF scorecard rated only 15 out of 173 companies as performing well.

In 2020 a study by Chain Reaction Research concluded that NDPE (No Deforestation, No Peat, No Exploitation) policies cover 83% of palm oil refineries. NDPE policies are according to the Chain Reaction Research the most effective private mechanism to cut the direct link with deforestation, due to the economic leverage refineries have over palm oil growers.

Palm oil is one of seven commodities included in the 2023 EU Regulation on Deforestation-free products (EUDR), which aims to guarantee that the products European Union (EU) citizens consume do not contribute to deforestation or forest degradation worldwide. After two postponements, its obligations for palm nuts and kernels, palm oil, palm kernel oil, palm kernel oilcake and certain palm-based oleochemicals, such as glycerol and industrial fatty acids and fatty alcohols, apply from 30 December 2026, and from 30 June 2027 for operators that are natural persons or micro or small undertakings established by 31 December 2024. A Commission delegated regulation in force since 18 September 2026 specified that the oleochemical entries cover only products made using oil palm, and added 16 further palm-derived product lines from 30 December 2027, including hydrogenated and chemically modified palm oils, fatty alcohols such as cetyl and stearyl alcohol, and soap.

==== Comparative environmental impacts with fossil fuels ====
Compared to fossil fuels, palm oil systems have lower non-renewable energy consumption, global warming potential (GWP, excluding land-use change), and acidification potential than fossil fuel alternatives. As a biofuel, palm oil increases eutrophication potential (EP).

== See also ==
- Council of Palm Oil Producing Countries
- Coconut oil
- Palm sugar
- Tropical agriculture

== Sources ==
This article incorporates text from a free content work. Licensed under CC BY-SA IGO 3.0 (license statement/permission). Text taken from World Food and Agriculture – Statistical Yearbook 2023, FAO, FAO.
