= Stearin =

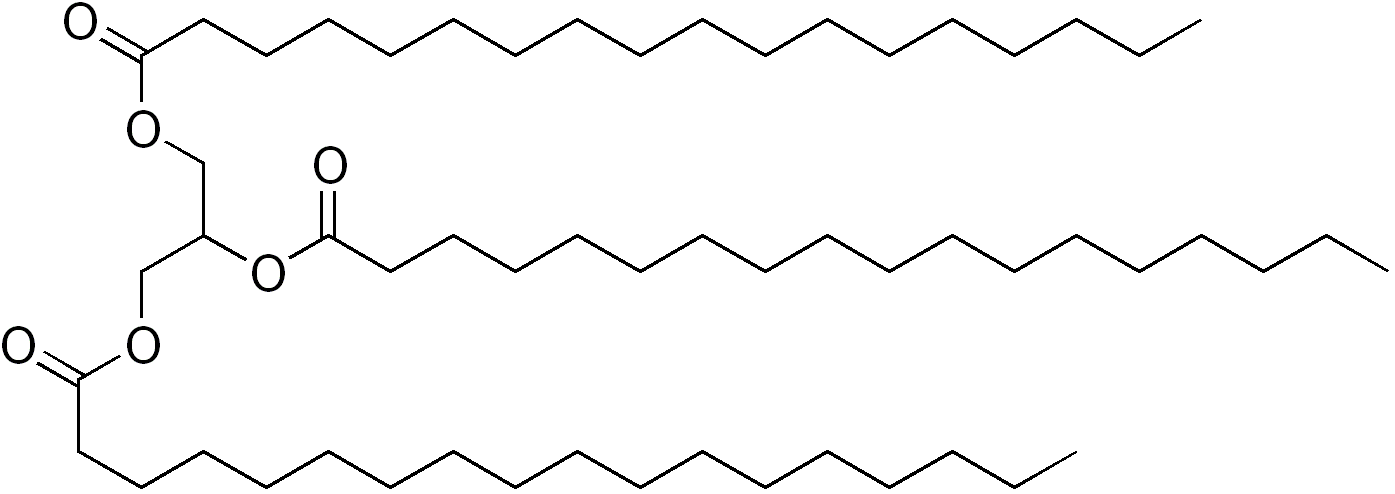

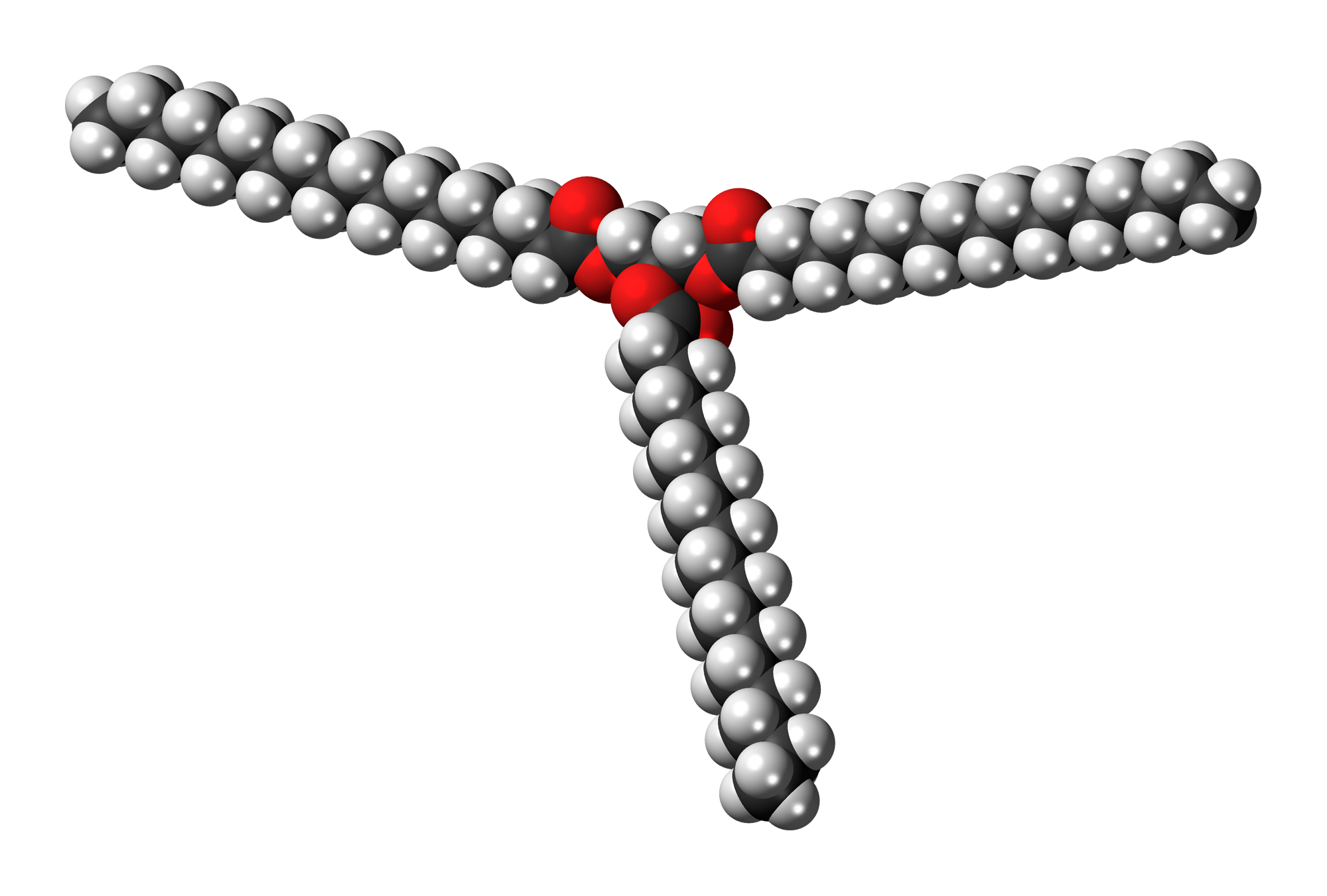

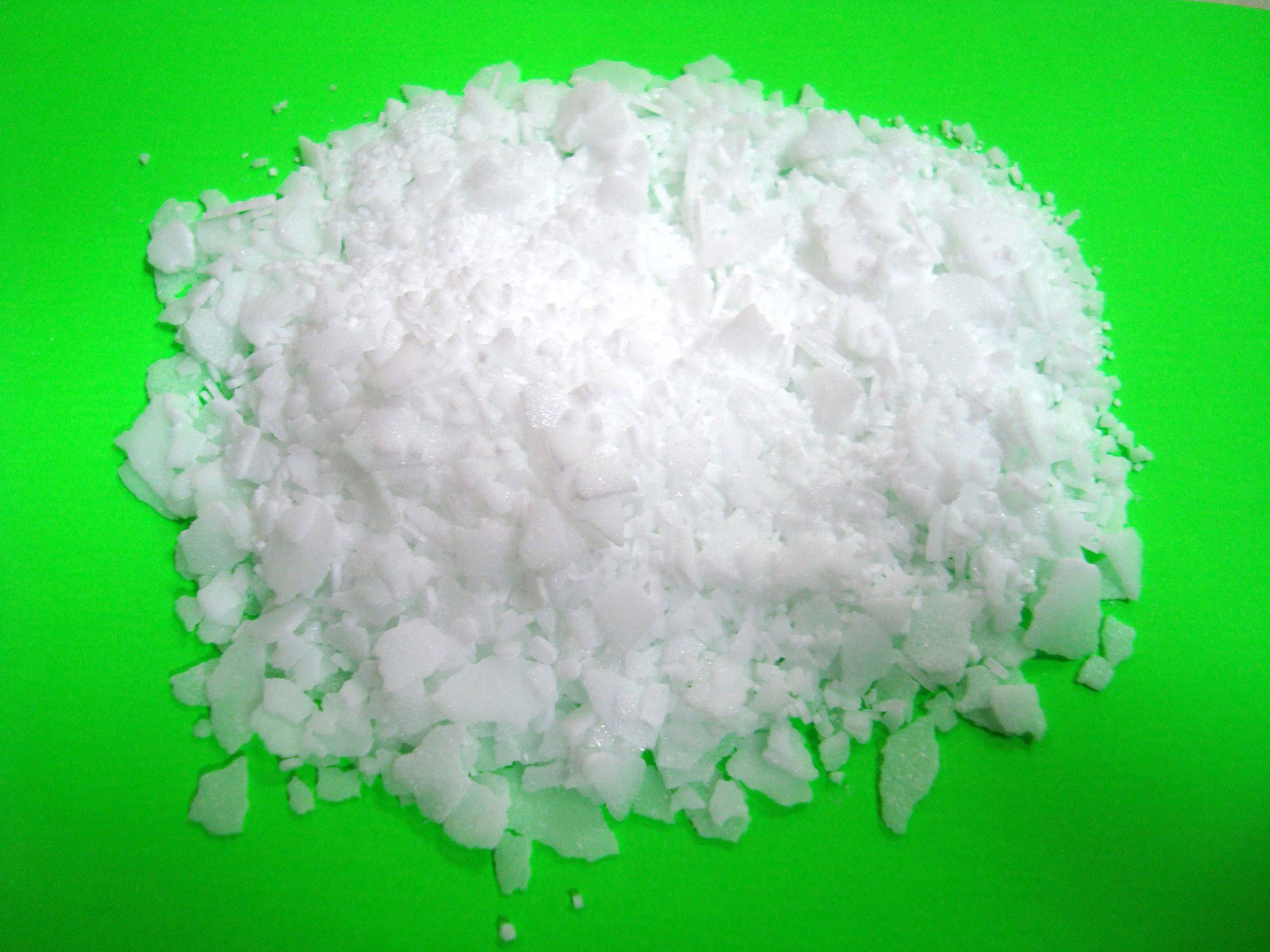

Names
- Systematic IUPAC name Propane-1,2,3-triyl tri(octadecanoate)
- Other names Tristearin; Trioctadecanoin; Glycerol tristearate; Glyceryl tristearate

Identifiers
CAS Number	555-43-1
3D model (JSmol)	Interactive image
ChEBI	CHEBI:45956
ChemSpider	10673
ECHA InfoCard	100.008.271
KEGG	D10637
PubChem CID	11146
UNII	P6OCJ2551R
CompTox Dashboard (EPA)	DTXSID8047503
- InChI: InChI=1S/C57H110O6/c1-4-7-10-13-16-19-22-25-28-31-34-37-40-43-46-49-55(58)61-52-54(63-57(60)51-48-45-42-39-36-33-30-27-24-21-18-15-12-9-6-3)53-62-56(59)50-47-44-41-38-35-32-29-26-23-20-17-14-11-8-5-2/h54H,4-53H2,1-3H3 Key: DCXXMTOCNZCJGO-UHFFFAOYSA-N; InChI=1S/C57H110O6/c1-4-7-10-13-16-19-22-25-28-31-34-37-40-43-46-49-55(58)61-52-54(63-57(60)51-48-45-42-39-36-33-30-27-24-21-18-15-12-9-6-3)53-62-56(59)50-47-44-41-38-35-32-29-26-23-20-17-14-11-8-5-2/h54H,4-53H2,1-3H3 Key: DCXXMTOCNZCJGO-UHFFFAOYSA-N
- SMILES: CCCCCCCCCCCCCCCCCC(=O)OCC(COC(=O)CCCCCCCCCCCCCCCCC)OC(=O)CCCCCCCCCCCCCCCCC

Properties
Chemical formula	C_{57}H_{110}O_{6}
Molar mass	891.501 g·mol^{−1}
Appearance	White powder
Odor	Odorless
Density	0.862 g/cm^{3} (80 °C); 0.8559 g/cm^{3} (90 °C)
Melting point	54–72.5 °C (129.2–162.5 °F; 327.1–345.6 K)
Solubility in water	Insoluble
Solubility	Slightly soluble in C_{6}H_{6}, CCl_{4}; Soluble in acetone, CHCl_{3}; Insoluble in EtOH
Refractive index (n_{D})	1.4395 (80 °C)

Structure
Crystal structure	Triclinic (β-form)
Space group	P1̅ (β-form)
Lattice constant	a = 12.0053 Å, b = 51.902 Å, c = 5.445 Å (β-form) α = 73.752°, β = 100.256°, γ = 117.691°

Thermochemistry
Heat capacity (C)	1342.8 J/mol·K (β-form, 272.1 K); 1969.4 J/mol·K (346.5 K)
Std molar entropy (S^{⦵}_{298})	1534.7 J/mol·K (liquid)
Std enthalpy of formation (Δ_{f}H^{⦵}_{298})	−2344 kJ/mol
Std enthalpy of combustion (Δ_{c}H^{⦵}_{298})	35806.7 kJ/mol

Hazards
NFPA 704 (fire diamond)	1 1 0
Flash point	≥ 300 °C (572 °F; 573 K) closed cup
- Lethal dose or concentration (LD, LC)
LD_{50} (median dose)	2000 mg/kg (rats, oral)
- Except where otherwise noted, data are given for materials in their standard state (at 25 °C [77 °F], 100 kPa). verify (what is ?) Infobox references

Stearin /ˈstɪərɪn/, or tristearin, or glyceryl tristearate is an odourless, white powder. It is a triglyceride derived from three units of stearic acid. Most triglycerides are derived from at least two and more commonly three different fatty acids. Like other triglycerides, stearin can crystallise in three polymorphs. For stearin, these melt at 54 °C (α-form), 65 °C, and 72.5 °C (β-form).

Note that stearin is also used to mean the solid component of an oil or fat that can be separated into components that melt at higher (the stearin) and lower (the olein) temperatures. This is the usage meant in an example such as palm stearin.

== Occurrence ==
Stearin is obtained from animal fats created as a byproduct of processing beef. It can also be found in tropical plants such as palm. It can be partially purified by dry fractionation by pressing tallow or other fatty mixtures, leading to separation of the higher melting stearin-rich material from the liquid, which is typically enriched in fats derived from oleic acid. It can be obtained by interesterification, again exploiting its higher melting point which allows the higher melting tristearin to be removed from the equilibrated mixture. Stearin is a side product obtained during the extraction of cod liver oil removed during the chilling process at temperatures below −5 °C.

== Uses ==
Stearin is used as a hardening agent in the manufacture of candles and soap. It is mixed with a sodium hydroxide solution in water, creating a reaction which gives glycerin and sodium stearate, the main ingredient in most soap:

C_{3}H_{5}(C_{18}H_{35}O_{2})_{3} + 3 NaOH → C_{3}H_{5}(OH)_{3} + 3 C_{18}H_{35}OONa

Stearin is also added to aluminium flakes to help in the grinding process in making dark aluminium powder.

== See also ==
- Candle
- Michel Eugène Chevreul
- Soap making
- Stearic acid
