= Minnesota Pollution Control Agency =

State government agency

The Minnesota Pollution Control Agency (MPCA) is a Minnesota state agency that monitors environmental quality, offers technical and financial assistance, and enforces environmental regulations for the State of Minnesota. The MPCA finds and cleans up spills and leaks that can affect public health and the environment. The MPCA staff develops statewide policies and supports environmental education, working with such partners as citizens, municipalities, businesses, environmental groups, and educators to prevent pollution and conserve resources.

== History ==
The agency was created on May 18, 1967, to further strengthen Senator Gordon Rosenmeier's environmental policies following the Mississippi River oil spill.

In 2018, the MPCA created the East Metro Unit to help address the PFAS released during the 3M contamination of Minnesota groundwater in the eastern Twin Cities metropolitan area.

The agency planned to test the entire 650-mile length (1,050 km) of the Mississippi River within the state for the first time in 2024.

== Acid rain regulation ==
In 1982, Minnesota governor Al Quie passed the Acid Deposition Control Act to regulate acid rain in Minnesota. Authority was granted to the MPCA to research and regulate acid rain levels. Throughout the late 1970s and early 1980s, the MPCA and the EPA sampled 1,842 lakes and found that 474 were sensitive to acid rain. Most sensitive lakes were small, averaging 240 acres, but many were important for fishing and recreation. Most lakes found highly sensitive were located in Itasca, Lake, Pine, and St. Louis counties. The MPCA found that most emissions associated with acid rain came from other states and Canadian provinces, especially Texas and the Gulf Coast.

In early 1986, the MPCA published recommendations to limit statewide emissions and place restrictions on power plants. The MPCA defended its case against the Northern States Power Company and Minnesota Power, in collaboration with scientists from the EPA, US Forest Service, and multiple universities. Scientists who testified in favor of regulation included Charles Driscoll, Michael Oppenheimer, Patrick Brezonik, Steven Lindberg, and Jerald Schnoor. In June, a judge certified the agency's findings, and in August the regulations were signed into law.
