= Palm stearin =

Palm oil derivative

Palm stearin is the solid fraction of palm oil that is produced by partial crystallization at controlled temperature. It is a stearin in the sense of stearins and oleins being the solid and liquid fractions respectively of fats and oils; not in the sense of glyceryl tristearate.

It is more variable in composition than palm olein, the liquid fraction of palm oil, especially in terms of its solid fat content, and therefore has more variable physical characteristics.^{p. 34} Like crude palm fruit oil, palm stearin contains carotenoids, but physically refined palm oils do not, as they are removed or destroyed in the refining process.^{p. 37}

== Uses ==
It is a useful source of natural hard vegetable fat for food applications.

== Composition ==
Palm stearin consists of mostly tripalmitin, also known as glyceryl tripalmitate, with most of the rest of the fat content being glyceryl dipalmitate monooleate.

In terms of fatty acid composition, a typical soft palm stearin might contain almost 50% palmitic acid and 35% oleic acid.^{p. 31}
