= CHS Ukraine =

Ukrainian agricultural company

- Company type: Agricultural company
- Industry: Agriculture; infrastructure; financial and risk management services
- Founded: 2008
- Headquarters: Ukraine, Kyiv, 8 Illinska St., "Illinskyi" Business Center, entrance 12
- Area served: Ukraine
- Key people: Vyacheslav Kolosvetov (chief executive officer)
- Products: Corn, wheat, barley, soy
- Number of employees: 30
- Website: http://www.chsinc.com/

CHS Ukraine is an agricultural company that exports grains; works in the area of infrastructure and with Ukrainian farmers with the help of financial services. The company began operating in Ukraine in 2008.

CHS Ukraine is a part of CHS Inc., an international agricultural company owned by farmers, landowners and US agricultural cooperatives. CHS Inc. is a farmer-owned cooperative in the US with over 75,000 producer-owners throughout country. It is a Fortune 500 company. In FY 2015, the company's net revenue was $34.6 billion.

== History ==
The history of CHS began in 1931 with the founding of the Farmers Union Central Exchange in Saint Paul, Minnesota. Later, the core cooperative company became Cenex, from the combination of the last two words in its previous name.

In 1998, Cenex merged with Harvest States Cooperatives to form Cenex Harvest States.

In 2003, the cooperative changed its legal name to CHS Inc.

In 2008, CHS entered the Ukrainian market.

In 2010, port terminal "Olimpex", into which CHS invested $40 million, was put into operation.

== Grains export ==
CHS Ukraine is one of the grain exporters on the Ukrainian market. CHS Ukraine annually exports 1 million tons of grains. Main crops include corn, wheat, barley, and soy. The company is a direct supplier of Ukrainian products to Egypt, Morocco, Korea, Indonesia, Bangladesh, Philippines, Spain, Israel, Italy, Algeria, Tunisia, China, Japan, and other markets.

== Port infrastructure ==
CHS Ukraine participates in the development of the port infrastructure in Ukraine and is among the first investors into port logistics, specifically the "Olimpex" terminal in Odesa, which began operation in 2010. Total investment amounted to $40 million. Currently, a port terminal "Olimpex" has the bandwidth of 3.5 million tons per year and rotation of 28 times per year.

== Financial services for farmers ==
CHS Ukraine has to offer Ukrainian farmers financial services in insurance, funding and risk management.

They include:

– access to the world prices and direct consumers of agricultural products for small and medium-sized farms;

– agricultural procurement contract of goods with minimal price and price fixing option;

– forward contracts with fixed prices;

– inventory financing of binary warehouse receipts;

– use of agricultural receipts for financing;

– joint financing program for farmers with seed, fertilizer, and fuel suppliers.

== Partnership ==
CHS is cooperating with companies from various industries all over the world and has a joint venture with ConAgra Foods (Cargill/CHS); AgFarm (Ruralco/CHS Australia); TEMCO (Cargill/CHS); and CF Industries Nitrogen (CF industries/CHS).

In Ukraine, the company cooperates with IFC, ОККО, Syngenta, and others as well as with the European Bank for Reconstruction and Development (EBRD)
