= 3M contamination of Minnesota groundwater =

The 3M PFAS contamination of Minnesota groundwater refers to pollution caused by disposal of per- and polyfluoroalkyl substances (PFAS) by 3M at four sites in Minnesota from the 1950s until the early 2000s. Per-and polyfluoroalkyl substances (PFAS) are a group of manmade chemicals used to make coatings and products that resist heat, oil, stains, grease, and water, and these properties led to widespread use in many products like Scotchgard However, once released into the environment, PFAS can persist for thousands of years. They have been found in soils, surface waters, fish, and human blood. Approximately 170,000 people in the Twin Cities metro area had their drinking water contaminated from four major disposal areas resulting in large-scale environmental studies and ongoing public health concerns. As part of this issue, in 2018, the State of Minnesota settled its case against 3M for approximately $850 million dollars to fund the construction of water treatment systems and restore the environment, making it one of the most costly environmental settlements in Minnesota's history.

== Background of PFAs ==
=== PFAs ===
Per- and polyfluoroalkyl substances (PFAS) are a large, complex group of synthetic chemicals that have been used in industry and consumer products since the 1940s. There are thousands of different PFAS molecules. PFAS are commonly used in a variety of products, including as a nonstick coating for packaging and cookware, making clothes and carpets resistant to stains, and creating firefighting foam. PFAS are characterized by multiple carbon–fluorine (C–F) bonds, which are among the strongest covalent bonds in organic chemistry. The PFAS molecule's structure causes an amphiphilic character. As a result, many PFAS compounds are useful as surfactants, reducing surface tension in coatings and foams. PFAS are especially resistant to heat, chemical, and biological degradation, leading to their persistence in the environment. They are commonly referred to as "forever chemicals" and have been found in people's blood worldwide, as well as in water, air, fish, and soil.

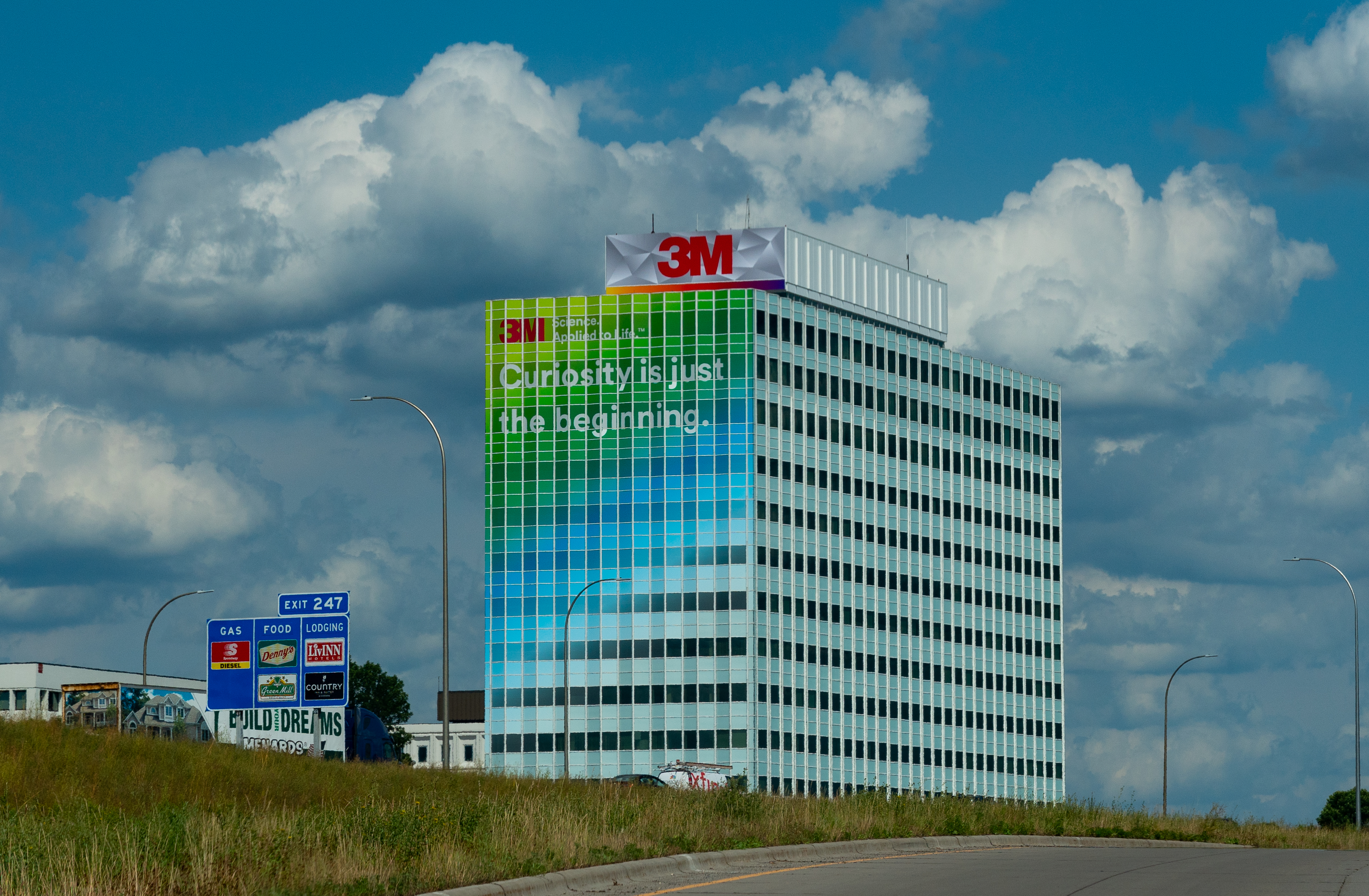
3M Corporate Headquarters – Located inside the state identified contamination area.

=== Timeline of use by 3M ===
In 1945, 3M purchased the rights to the Simons Process, which synthesizes perfluorooctanoic acid (PFOA), a type of PFAS. 3M determined that PFAS had utility in resisting heat, oil, stains, grease, and water. In 1949, 3M began mass producing PFOS based compounds and products. Through the 1950s to 1970s, 3M expanded production and applications of PFAS in coatings like Scotchgard, textiles, and firefighting foams. In 1998, 3M notified regulators and the EPA about PFAS's environmental and human risk. In 2000, 3M announced a voluntary phaseout of PFAS and related chemistries. Despite this, PFAS production has continued for decades until a planned completed phase out by the end of 2025.

=== PFAS Disposal and Dumping Sites ===
Minnesota PFAS contamination has been localized around 3M's manufacturing plant in Cottage Grove. From the 1950s through the early 2000s, waste containing PFAS was disposed at the 3M disposal sites in Oakdale, Woodbury, Cottage Grove, and the Washington County landfill in Lake Elmo. PFAS was released from these sites, resulting in the widespread contamination of the groundwater in surrounding regions.

== Communities affected ==
=== Populations ===
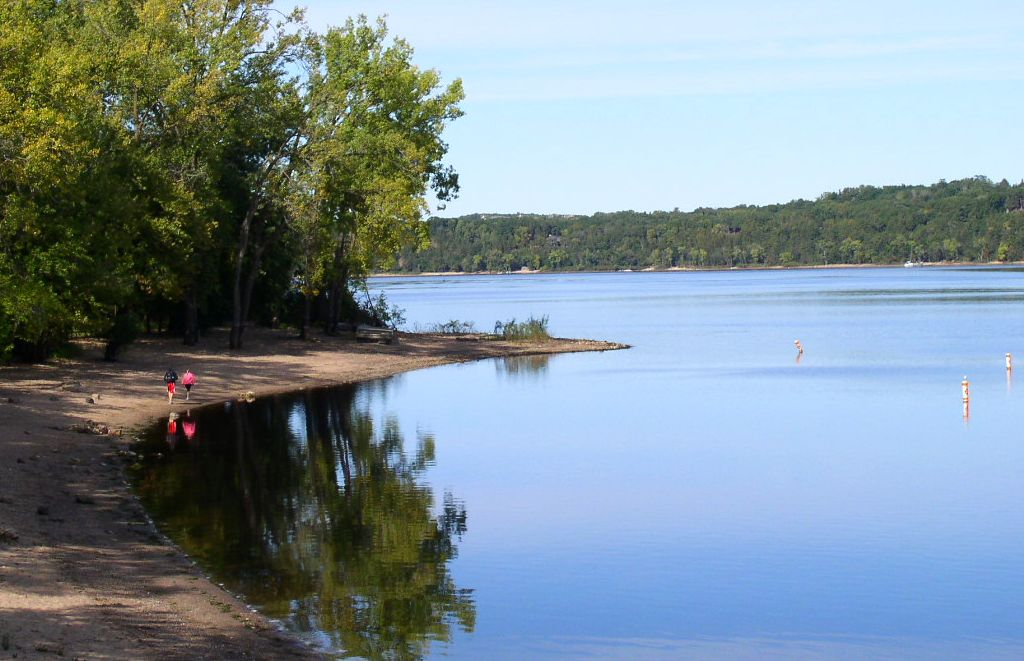
Afton State Park – One of the public parks located within the state identified contamination area.

The drinking water of 14 communities, over 170,000 individuals, and over 150 square miles was contaminated through 3M's improper disposal of chemicals. Some of these communities include Lake Elmo, Oakdale, Bayport, West Lakeland Townships, Lakeland, Lakeland Shores, St. Paul Park, Newport, and Woodbury.

=== Natural resources ===
The affected area is surrounded by both the Mississippi and St. Croix Rivers, contains Afton State Park, Lake Elmo Park Reserve, St. Croix Bluffs Regional Park, and Battle Creek Regional Park.

=== Health implications ===
PFAS exposure has been linked to a wide range of adverse health outcomes in humans, though the strength of evidence and effect varies by the chemical and by outcome. The U.S. Environmental Protection Agency claim that being exposed to certain PFAS is correlated with an elevated risk of kidney, prostate, and testicular cancers, reduced antibody response upon vaccination, elevated serum cholesterol, thyroid disruption, reduced fertility, and developmental defects, such as low birthweight, in children. In addition, a study in the journal Environmental Toxicology demonstrated that PFAS was associated with immune, liver, metabolic, carcinogenic, and reproductive outcome issues. A separate human exposure study drew a probable link between PFAS exposure and kidney cancer, testicular cancer, ulcerative colitis, thyroid disease, high cholesterol, and hypertension in pregnant individuals.

The Minnesota Department of Health (MDH) performed testing of long term East Metro area residents in order to measure the levels of PFAS in blood. 2008 testing revealed that there existed an elevated level of PFAS in these individuals compared to the average U.S. population. 2010 and 2014 testing showed that there was a significant decrease in PFAS levels over these next two testing periods.

== Consequences for 3M ==
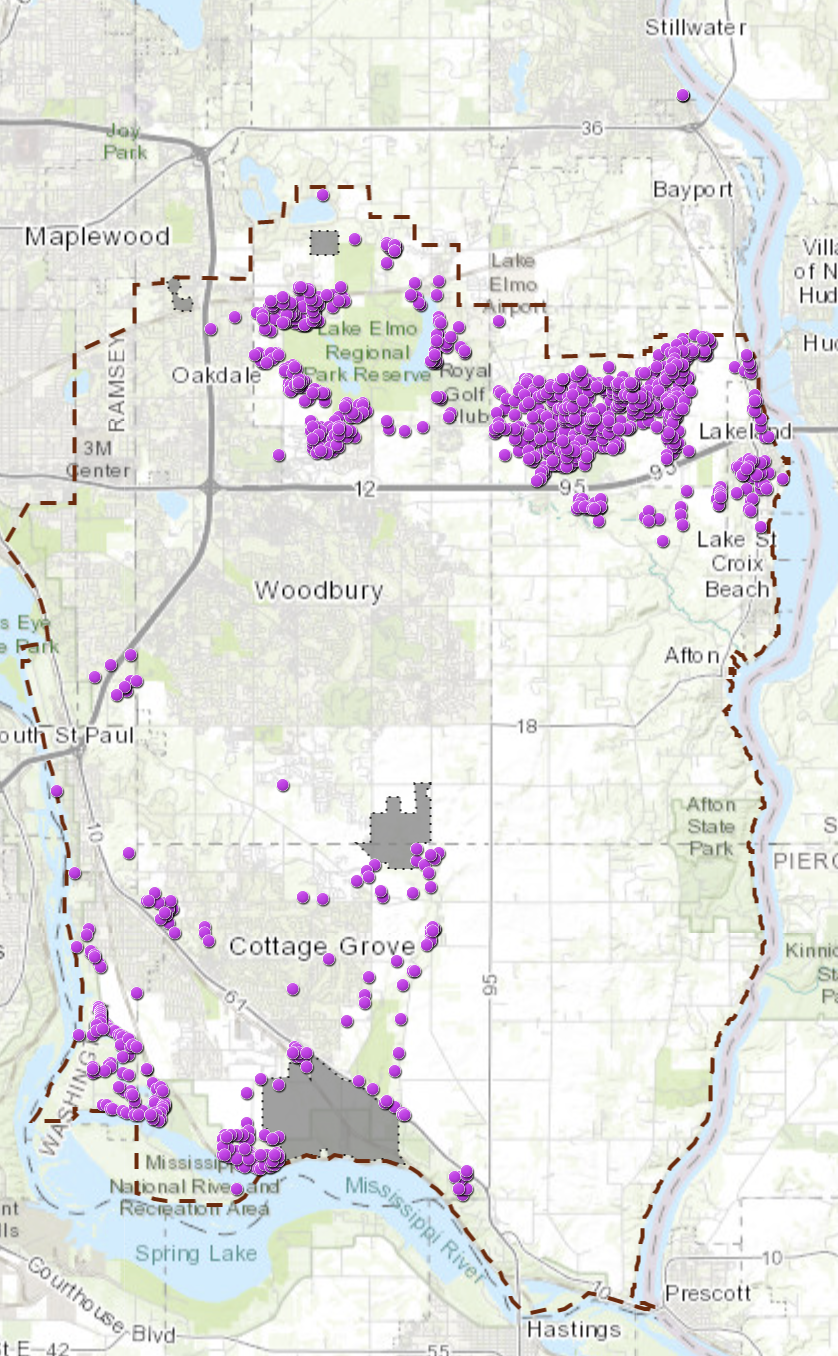
Grey, shaded areas represent 3M dumping areas. Purple dots represent contaminated water sources.

=== Media coverage ===
Numerous media outlets, such as the Star Tribune, Pioneer Press, MPR News, and the Minnesota Reformer, have covered the environmental and societal issues surrounding 3M's dumping of PFAS since the late 1990s. Coverage became more extensive after 3M announced that they were phasing out Scotchgard, a product containing perfluorooctanyl, which is a PFAS molecule.

A second wave of reporting occurred after the 2018 settlement and also after internal 3M records were unsealed in 2019.

In 2024, a report emerged from ProPublica and The New Yorker claiming that 3M scientists were aware of the PFAS in human blood as early as the 1970s and a description of this information's management within the corporation.

=== Legal trial and settlement ===
Following initial discoveries of groundwater contamination in 2002, the Minnesota Department of Health conducted numerous studies – concluding in 2008, 2010, and 2014 – on the level of PFAs found in the bloodstreams of exposed residents.

In 2007, MPCA and 3M were placed in a Consent Order where Chemolite, Woodbury, and Oakdale sites were required to be cleaned up. 3M's role in this was to clean and pay for water treatment as temporary solutions while longer term solutions were under development.

On February 20, 2018, the state of Minnesota settled its lawsuit against 3M in exchange for $850 million. After legal expenses, approximately $720 million will be invested in drinking water and other natural resource projects in the east metro area.

== Next steps ==
=== Mitigation and remediation ===
3M has stated that it has invested $300 million in water treatment systems at its Cottage Grove plant. Their website offers samples of PFAs and other chemicals used in their products to any researchers studying the environment and the long-term effects of chemicals. Based on varying population growth and development scenarios, Minnesota state agencies have mapped out 18 unique scenarios for the treatment of individual families' well-water and municipal water systems. The most expensive of these scenarios has an initial estimated cost of $1.2 billion, which is roughly $500 million more than the funding provided to affected communities by 3M.

=== Changes in practices ===
Although 3M has not used the four primary dumping sites which produced the groundwater contamination for the disposal of PFAs since the early 2000s, they continue to produce products containing PFAs. However, the awareness of PFA contamination has greatly increased the resources provided to their effective containment, particularly in the United States.
