= Salad oils =

Vegetable oils suitable for salad dressing

Salad oils are types of vegetable oil suitable for salad dressing. The major characteristic is passing the AOCS Cold Test (5.5 hours minimum). Oil is often combined with other substances to achieve desired flavour and viscosity.
