= Al Doty =

American politician

Member of the Minnesota House of Representatives from the 12B district
- In office January 3, 2007 – January 3, 2011
- Preceded by: Greg Blaine
- Succeeded by: Mike LeMieur

Personal details
- Born: October 19, 1945 (age 80) Minnesota
- Party: Minnesota Democratic-Farmer-Labor Party
- Spouse: Donna
- Children: 2
- Education: University of Minnesota Morris; University of Manitoba
- Profession: senior citizen advocate, educator, legislator

Al Doty (born October 19, 1945) is a Minnesota politician and a former member of the Minnesota House of Representatives who represented District 12B, which includes portions of Crow Wing and Morrison counties. A Democrat, he was first elected in 2006 when he defeated three-term Republican incumbent Greg Blaine. He was re-elected in 2008, but was unseated by Republican Mike LeMieur in the 2010 general election.

== Biography ==
Doty taught social studies, coached wrestling, and was technology coordinator at Pierz High School in Pierz from 1968 until he retired in 1999. After retiring, he went to work as a senior citizen advocate for Horizon Health, Inc. in Pierz.

In 2004, Doty ran for the District 12B seat as an Independence Party candidate against Rep. Blaine and DFL-endorsed candidate Bob Keeton. Blaine won the election. In March 2006, he was asked by the DFL Party to run as their candidate after Bob Keeton dropped out. He won the election by 582 votes. In 2008, he was challenged by Little Falls city councilman Mike LeMieur. He was re-elected by a narrow margin of 76 votes. In 2012, Doty ran for the Minnesota Senate in the redrawn District 9 and was defeated by Paul Gazelka.

Doty served on the House Agriculture, Rural Economies and Veterans Affairs Committee and on that committee's subcommittee for Veterans Affairs. He was also a member of the Finance subcommittees for the Agriculture, Rural Economies and Veterans Affairs Finance Division, and the Environment and Natural Resources Finance Division.

== Electoral history ==
2012 Minnesota Senate Election District 9
Party	Candidate	Votes	%	±%
Democratic (DFL)	Al Doty	17,687	46.22%	
Republican	Paul Gazelka	20,527	53.65%	

2008 Minnesota House of Representatives Election District 12B
Party	Candidate	Votes	%	±%
Democratic (DFL)	Al Doty	10,071	50.11%	−1.59%
Republican	Mike LeMieur	9,995	49.73%	+1.52%
Write-ins		33	.16%	+.06%
Margin of victory		76	.38%	−3.11%
Turnout		20,099	87%	+14%
Democratic (DFL) hold		Swing		

2006 Minnesota House of Representatives Election District 12B
Party	Candidate	Votes	%	±%
Democratic (DFL)	Al Doty	8,615	51.7%	+14.25%
Republican	Greg Blaine	8,033	48.21%	−1.86%
Write-ins		16	.1%	+.02%
Margin of victory		582	3.49%	
Turnout		16,664	73%	−25%
Democratic (DFL) gain from Republican				

2004 Minnesota House of Representatives Election District 12B
Party	Candidate	Votes	%	±%
Republican	Greg Blaine	9,933	50.07%	−6.83%
Democratic (DFL)	Bob Keeton	7,430	37.45%	−5.64%
Independent	Al Doty	2,460	12.4%	
Write-ins		16	.08%	+.07%
Margin of victory		2,530	12.56%	−1.25%
Turnout		19,839	98%	+20%
Republican hold		Swing		

Note: The ±% column reflects the change in total number of votes won by each party from the previous election.
