= Frances Eliza Babbitt =

American archaeologist

Frances "Franc" Eliza Babbitt
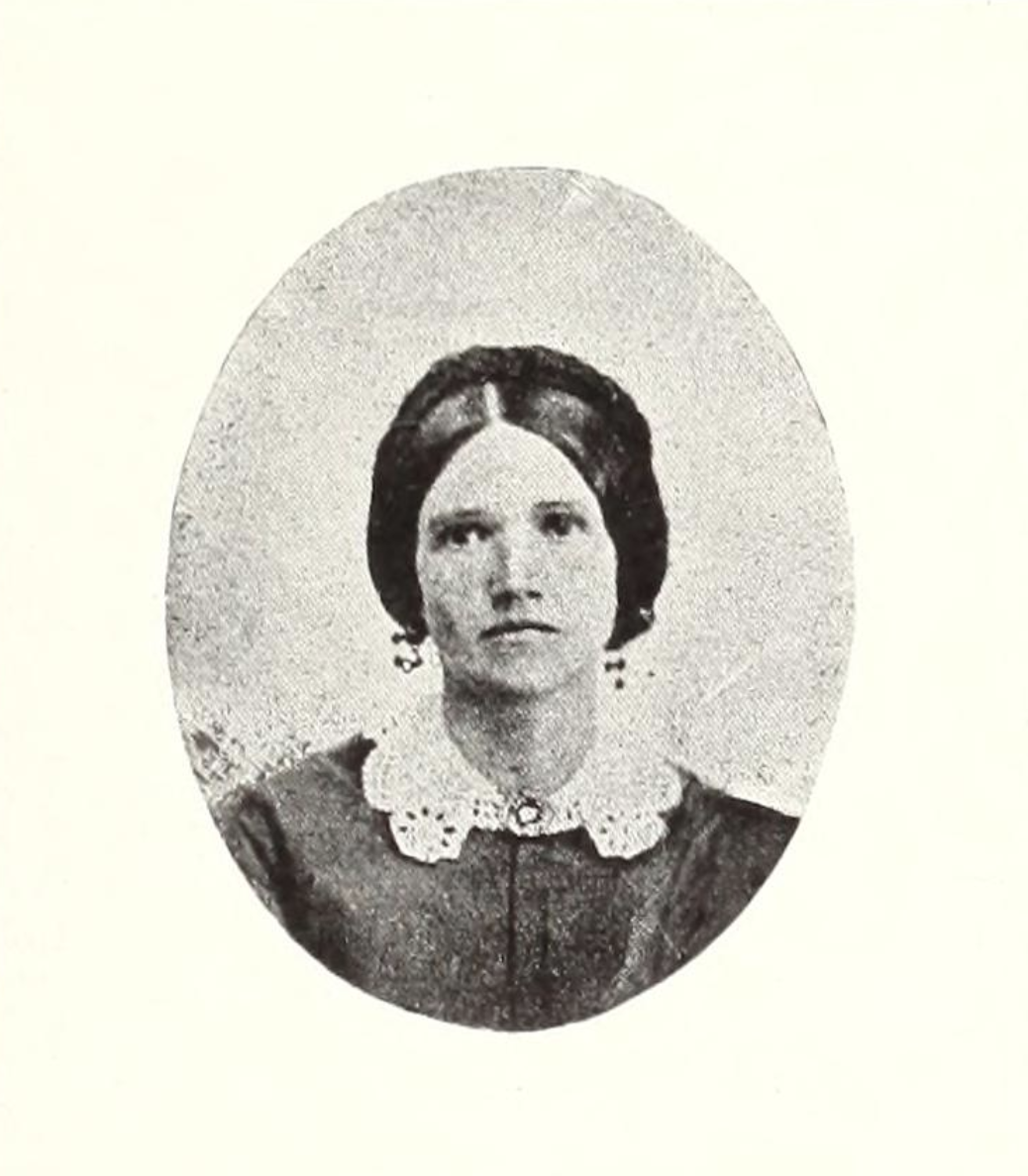
- Born: January 24, 1824; New York, U.S.
- Died: July 6, 1891 (aged 67)
- Resting place: Coldwater, Michigan
- Occupations: Teacher, Archaeologist

Frances "Franc" Eliza Babbitt (1824–1891) was a schoolteacher in Minnesota and an archaeologist. She influenced early debates about the Paleolithic Era in North America, the "American Paleolithic". Babbitt collected quartz tools and other artifacts from the Little Falls, Minnesota area. Her findings were presented in papers at American Association for the Advancement of Science (AAAS) meetings and in academic journals. Although women were active in other scientific disciplines during this time, Babbitt was one of few to participate in archaeology.

== Early life ==
Babbitt was born in New York on January 24, 1824, and became a schoolteacher at the age of 20. In 1873, she moved to Cold Water, Michigan. A few years later, in 1878, she moved to Little Falls, Minnesota.

== Career ==
Babbitt worked as a schoolteacher, but was an active amateur archaeologist. She also spent time at the local Ojibwe reservation. Some of her articles were based on observations she made while working with indigenous people.

In 1879, Babbitt found thousands of quartz objects on the east bank of the Mississippi River. The objects were exposed in a washout and a wagon rut that cut 15 feet below the surrounding ground surface. Babbitt communicated her finds to archaeologists and other scientists, including Alexander Newton Winchell, Frederic W. Putnam, Warren Upham, Charles Abbott, Henry W. Haynes, Charles Rau, and Otis Mason. They were first presented at the Department of American History at the Minnesota Historical Society in St. Paul, in February 1880. In 1883, Babbitt worked with Warren Upham to prepare a paper on her findings for the annual meeting of the AAAS, held that year in Minneapolis. The paper was subsequently published in the Proceedings of the meeting. In the paper, Babbitt held that humans had created the quartz objects and that they had not been disturbed or moved. The quartz objects Babbitt found were also presented at the AAAS meeting in Philadelphia in 1884. She wrote descriptions of them and they were subject of debates about the history of human activities during the Ice Age on the American continent. The next year, she wrote an article about her evidence for "glacial man" in Minnesota for the American Naturalist.

Some archaeologists, including William H. Holmes, rejected the conclusions of Babbitt and her coauthors, arguing that the objects were more modern and were rejects from a quarry. Holmes's objections to Babbitt's findings also focused on the credentials of Babbitt and her collaborators. The debate about the "Babbitt finds" continued into the 1890s after she died. The findings have since been demonstrated to be "naturefacts", quartz objects created by natural processes.

With the support of Frederic W. Putnam, Babbitt was one of the first women to join the AAAS (1883) and became a fellow of the society in 1887. She also provided a manuscript list giving the geographical range of several plant species that Warren Upham used to produce a catalogue of Minnesota's flora.

Babbitt died on July 6, 1891, and is buried in a family plot in Coldwater, Michigan. A relative "disposed" of her collection of quartz objects after her death.

== Selected works ==
- Babbitt, Franc (1881). "Red Lake Notes". Journal of the Minnesota Academy of Science. 2 (3): 86–101.
- Babbitt, Franc E. (July 1884). "Vestiges of Glacial Man in Minnesota". The American Naturalist. 18 (7): 697–708. Bibcode:1884ANat...18..697B. doi:10.1086/273712. S2CID 83927583.
- Babbitt, Frances Eliza (1884). Exhibition and Description of Some Paleolithic Quartz Implements from Central Minnesota. American Association for the Advancement of Science.
- Babbitt, Franc E. (16 May 1884). "Indian Implements of the Northwest". Science. ns-3 (67): 589–590. Bibcode:1884Sci.....3..589B. doi:10.1126/science.ns-3.67.589. PMID 17738946.
- Babbitt, Franc E. (12 December 1884). "Some Implements of the Minnesota Ojibwas". Science. ns-4 (97): 527–529. Bibcode:1884Sci.....4..527B. doi:10.1126/science.ns-4.97.527. PMID 17773554.
- Babbitt, Franc E. (11 June 1886). "Some Ojibwa and Dakota Practices". Science. ns-7 (175): 526–528. Bibcode:1886Sci.....7..526B. doi:10.1126/science.ns-7.175.526. PMID 17807260.
- Babbitt, Franc E. (5 August 1887). "Lake Itasca". Science. ns-10 (235): 72. doi:10.1126/science.ns-10.235.72.f.
