= Mike LeMieur =

American politician

Member of the Minnesota House of Representatives from the 12B district
- In office January 4, 2011 – January 7, 2013
- Preceded by: Al Doty
- Succeeded by: district redrawn

Personal details
- Born: August 6, 1968 (age 57) Little Falls, Minnesota
- Party: Republican Party of Minnesota
- Spouse: Julie Crowder LeMieur
- Children: 3
- Profession: small business owner, legislator

Michael W. LeMieur (born August 6, 1968) is a Minnesota politician and former member of the Minnesota House of Representatives who represented District 12B, which includes portions of Crow Wing and Morrison counties in the central part of the state. A Republican, he is also a small business owner.

LeMieur was first elected to the House in 2010. He served on the Agriculture and Rural Development Policy and Finance and the Jobs and Economic Development Finance committees. He was also a member of the State Government Finance Subcommittee for the Veterans Services Division and the Taxes Subcommittee for the Property and Local Tax Division.

LeMieur was born and raised in Little Falls. Active in his community, he served as a member and president of the Little Falls City Council. He has served on the Little Falls Fire Department for many years, and is a member of the Minnesota Fire Chief's Association and the Little Falls Fire Relief Association. He is also a member of the Minnesota Deer Hunters Association, Pheasants Forever and the National Rifle Association of America. His uncle, former State Representative Steve Wenzel, represented the same area from 1973 to 2001.
