= Greg Blaine =

American politician (born 1961)

Member of the Minnesota House of Representatives from the 12B district
- In office November 15, 2001 – December 31, 2006
- Preceded by: Steve Wenzel
- Succeeded by: Al Doty

Personal details
- Born: 1961 (age 64–65) (Note: The Minnesota Legislative Reference Library lists March 24, 1961, as a birthdate, though notes that this is uncertain.)
- Party: Republican
- Spouse: Michelle Kunkel
- Education: Little Falls Community High School (1979); St. Cloud Technical College (1980)
- Occupation: Dairy farmer; businessman; foreman

Greg Blaine (born 1961) is an American farmer, foreman, businessman, and politician who served as a member of the Minnesota House of Representatives as a member of the 12B district, which consisted of parts of Morrison and Crow Wing counties, from 2001 to 2006.

== Early life ==
Blaine graduated from Little Falls Community High School in Little Falls, Minnesota, in 1979 and graduated from St. Cloud Technical College the following year.

== Career ==
Blaine and his wife purchased a dairy farm in Culdrum Township, Morrison County, Minnesota, in 1990. Together, they owned and operated Bartchelle Dairy, which continued to operate after Blaine announced his first bid for the Minnesota Legislature. Blaine also worked as a shop foreman for 15 years prior to his candidacy at Blaine Printing in Little Falls.

=== Legislative career ===
==== First term (2001 – 2002) ====
Blaine announced his candidacy for 12B district of the Minnesota House of Representatives in August 2001. The district included parts of Cass, Crow Wing and Morrison counties. Previous representative Steve Wenzel resigned from the post to accept a position at the U.S. Department of Agriculture. A member of the Republican Party, Blaine announced his campaign would focus on improving the agricultural economy, restricting access to abortion, reduce taxes, utilize state aid for the improvement of both public and private education, and protect the right to bear arms. Blaine faced no Republican opposition during the special election, which was held on November 6, 2001.

During the 2001 campaign, Blaine received press attention for his stated opposition to the provision of health benefits to state employees in same-sex relationships following a recently-settled state employees' contract. He faced criticism from representative Tom Pugh following his opposition. In the general election, Blaine faced Helen McLennan of the Minnesota Democratic–Farmer–Labor Party. In the run-up to the election, the race was predicted to be close. At the time, Republicans held a slim 69–65 member majority in the House. Blaine won the election with 6,602 votes, or around 60% of the vote share, becoming the first new representative of the district in nearly thirty years since Wenzel took office. Blaine was sworn into his seat on November 15, 2001.

During his first term, Blaine authored a bill that would provide over $600,000 to the Minnesota Department of Agriculture's Rural Finance Authority to provide loans for manure digester systems. The bill passed both the House and Senate in February 2001. He also authored legislation that would halt taxation on the first $5,000 of military pay for members of the Minnesota National Guard and reserve members of the armed forces in March 2001. That same month, he authored a bill that would give active-duty National Guard members the same benefits as other military personnel, which was also approved by both the House and Senate.

Also during his first term, the boundaries for district 12B were redrawn, giving the city of Baxter to the 12A district, while 12B gained four primarily rural southern Morrison County townships. In April, near the conclusion of the legislative session, Blaine announced he would again seek office. During his first term, Blaine was the chief author of 15 bills and was a co-author of 30 bills, largely focusing on education, anti-abortion, healthcare, agriculture, and military policy. He was also a member of the ways and means committee, along with committees on crime prevention, agriculture policy, and rural development finance.

==== Second term (2003 – 2004) ====
Blaine was met with a challenge from DFL candidate Debra Copa Nagel, who contended for the DFL nomination in the 2001 special election. Nagel had served as a township officer for Pike Creek Township in Morrison County for ten years at the time of her campaign. Among the biggest campaigning points for Blaine during this cycle were cutting of the state budget (exempting cuts to education and healthcare), opposition to an additional gas tax, low or no-interest loans for farm expansion or startups, cleanup of the Hennepin Paper Company mill site in Little Falls, and the addition of an anti-terrorism training camp at Fort Ripley.

Blaine won re-election on November 5, 2002, with 9,651 votes, or 56.9% of the total share, compared to Nagel's 7,309 votes and 43.09% share. In January, Blaine was appointed to serve on four House committees: agriculture policy, judiciary policy and finance, local government, and agriculture finance. He was selected as vice chair of the agriculture policy committee.

Early in his term, Blaine was a co-author of a bill which required the recitation of the Pledge of Allegiance in Minnesota classrooms at least once a week. In February 2003, Blaine was a sponsor of a bill which would scrap Minnesota's Profile of Learning graduation standards, calling for standards with a greater focus on language arts, math, science, history, and geography. The following month, Blaine co-authored bills requiring county court administrators to report to the Minnesota Department of Health how many minor girls notified their parents that they were pursuing an abortion, compared to how many sought a legal bypass to notifying their parents, an informed consent bill which required abortion clinics to disclose risks associated with abortion, along with alternatives to abortion, a bill that would require schools with vending machines to dispense beverages such as milk, juice, and water, in addition to soft drinks, and a bill requiring students receiving over $2,000 in state financial aid to partake in community service to the college or university.

A bill allowing E-2 visa holders to purchase farmland in the state, which Blaine co-authored, sparked some backlash among local farmers. With an amendment that visa holders had to live in the state 10 months out of the year, the bill passed the House in May.

==== Third term (2005 – 2006) ====
Blaine fended off a primary challenge from June Varner on September 14, 2004. Blaine finished with 1,394 votes, or an 88% share, compared to Varner's 185 votes, or 12%. He faced DFL candidate Bob Keeton and Independence Party candidate Al Doty, the former holder of the seat, in the general election. Blaine won re-election to his third term on November 2, receiving 9,933 votes (50.07%) compared to Keeton's 7,430 (37.45%) and Doty's 2,460 (12.4%).

=== Post-Senate activities ===
After his election defeat, Blaine served on Minnesota Commissioner of Agriculture Gene Hugoson's Dairy Profitability Advisory Committee. He was reappointed in 2009. That year, Blaine was elected a director of the Minnesota Milk Producers Association.

In 2017, Blaine announced his candidacy for the District 5 seat on the Morrison County Board of Commissioners. In April 2018, Blaine defeated Kenneth Primus for the seat with 514 votes, or 53.26% of the share, compared to Primus's 449 votes, or 46.53% of the share. Blaine won re-election in 2022.

In 2021, Blaine was named the president of the Gordon Rosenmeier Center for State and Local Government at Central Lakes College. Blaine became a vice-chair of the center in 2025.

== Personal life ==
Blaine married Michelle Kunkel, a technology technician for Little Falls Community School District. Both Blaine and his wife were members of Our Lady of Lourdes Catholic Church in Little Falls. Blaine served on the parish council at the time of his election and was previously the council president. Blaine is also associated with several state associations related to dairy farming and business owners.
