= KFML =

KFML may refer to:

- KFML (FM), a radio station (94.1 FM) licensed to Little Falls, Minnesota, United States
- Communist Party of Sweden (1967), originally named Kommunistiska Förbundet Marxist-Leninisterna
