= Gordon D. Gerling =

American politician (1921–2016)

Gordon D. Gerling (September 3, 1921 – July 14, 2016) was an American businessman and politician.

Gerling was born in the family home in Morton, Renville County, Minnesota. He graduated from the Blue Earth Area High School in Blue Earth, Minnesota and went to the radar school at Dunwoody Institute. He also went to the University of Minnesota. Gerling served in the United States Army Air Forces during World War II and was a radar operator. He lived in Little Falls, Morrison County, Minnesota with his wife and family and was involved in the insurance business. Gerling served in the Minnesota House of Representatives in 1957 and 1958 and from 1961 to 1966. He died in Little Falls, Minnesota.
