= Arthur DeLacy Wood =

American judge

- Born: October 3, 1876; Little Falls, Minnesota, U.S.
- Died: April 9, 1958 (aged 81); Munising, Michigan, U.S.
- Known for: Lawyer; Newspaper publisher; Parole board
- Parents: A. DeLacy Wood (father); Julia A. Wood (mother)
- Family: Minnie Mary Lee (grandmother)

Arthur DeLacy Wood (October 3, 1876 – April 9, 1958) was an American lawyer, publisher of the Munising News, probate judge in Alger County, Michigan, and first chairperson of the United States Parole Commission.

== Life ==
Wood, born in 1876, was the son of Julia A. Wood and A. DeLacy Wood, a peripatetic newspaper editor who specialized in small papers in the late-19th-century United States lumber belt. He moved with his family from Minnesota to Grand Marais, Michigan, at age 17, and worked in an Upper Peninsula lumber mill. From age 21 to age 34, Wood was the owner and publisher of the struggling Grand Marais Herald. He also read law and was admitted to practice in Michigan. In 1908, Wood was elected to the position of probate judge in his home county of Alger. In 1910, Wood closed the Grand Marais paper and moved to the county seat of Munising. He became publisher of the local weekly there, the Munising News.

As a Republican editor, Wood made friends and connections across Michigan in his joint capacity as county judge and newspaperman. In December 1926, newly-chosen governor-elect Fred W. Green tapped Wood to be Michigan's first commissioner of paroles and pardons. Wood's performance in the state capital, Lansing, made him attractive to the Herbert Hoover administration in Washington. In 1930, the United States Department of Justice implemented the first U.S. federal parole law by setting up the United States Parole Board (now the United States Parole Commission). Named first chairperson of the board, Wood served from 1930 until 1946.

Wood is credited with speaking out in favor of the United States parole system on both the state and the federal level, repeatedly characterizing it not as a favor to criminals but as an element of efficient government. His arguments used panopticon elements, arguing that the parole system extends the chronological period of time within which a defendant's behavior can be monitored and supervised. Wood's work for the board was praised at the time for fairness and efficiency. During the ten-year period of the 1930s, the U.S. Parole Board oversaw the disposition of 90,000 individual cases.

Wood retired from the federal parole board in 1946. Returning to his home town of Munising, he was once again elected to be the local probate judge, and served 1946–1956. He died in Munising in 1958, leaving his widow Sophia Wood. The couple had been the parents of eight children.
