= George P. Wetzel Sr. =

American politician

George P. Wetzel Sr. (March 3, 1921 – September 20, 2014) was an American legislator and jurist.

Born in Little Falls, Minnesota, Wetzel served in the United States Marine Corps during World War II. He received his bachelor's degree from the University of Minnesota and his law degree from the University of Minnesota Law School. He then practiced law in Little Falls, Minnesota. From 1950 to 1954, Wetzel was an agent for the Federal Bureau of Investigation. From 1957 to 1960, Wetzel served in the Minnesota House of Representatives. From 1971 to his retirement in 1989, Wetzel served as probate judge, then county judge, and finally district judge for Morrison County, Minnesota. Wetzel died at his home in Little Falls, Minnesota, in 2014.
