= WYRQ-FM =

- Little Falls, Minnesota; United States
- Broadcast area: Morrison County, Minnesota
- Frequency: 92.1 MHz
- RDS: PI: 95D2; PS: WYRQ FM
- Branding: Q92

Programming
- Format: Country Music
- Affiliations: CNN Radio

Ownership
- Owner: Little Falls Radio Corporation
- Sister stations: KLTF, KFML

History
- Call sign meaning: W YouR Country Q92

Technical information
- Licensing authority: FCC
- Facility ID: 74277
- Class: A
- ERP: 6,000 watts
- HAAT: 91.0 meters (298.6 ft)
- Transmitter coordinates: 45°56′57.00″N 94°17′48.00″W

Links
- Public license information: Public file; LMS
- Webcast: Listen Live
- Website: fallsradio.com

WYRQ-FM (92.1 FM) is a radio station broadcasting a Country Music format. Licensed to Little Falls, Minnesota, United States, the station serves the Morrison County, Minnesota, area. WYRQ-FM is located in a studio at 16405 Haven Road, with its two sister stations. Its transmitter is southeast of Little Falls.

The station is currently owned by Little Falls Radio Corporation, and includes news programming from CNN Radio. WYRQ-FM provides sports broadcasts, specifically for Little Falls Community High School.

== History ==
WYRQ-FM officially signed on the air in May 1980. The station was established as a new FM service for Morrison County, complementing the existing AM service provided by KLTF In its first decade, the station underwent a transition in ownership. In May 1988, a construction permit and license assignment were filed to transfer the station from Dakota Broadcasting Co. to Donald C. Schiel and his wife, Rita Schiel, for a purchase price of $240,000. This acquisition preceded the formation of the current Little Falls Radio Corporation cluster.
