= KLTF =

- Little Falls, Minnesota; United States
- Frequency: 960 kHz
- Branding: AM 960 KLTF

Programming
- Format: Talk radio
- Affiliations: ABC Radio, Fox Sports Radio, Salem Communications

Ownership
- Owner: Little Falls Radio Corporation
- Sister stations: KFML (FM), WYRQ-FM

History
- First air date: 1950
- Call sign meaning: Little Falls

Technical information
- Licensing authority: FCC
- Facility ID: 37780
- Class: D
- Power: 5,000 watts (day); 38 watts (night)
- Transmitter coordinates: 46°0′16″N 94°19′42″W

Links
- Public license information: Public file; LMS
- Webcast: Listen live
- Website: KLTF-AM

KLTF (960 AM) is a radio station broadcasting a talk format. Licensed to Little Falls, Minnesota, United States. It serves the entire Morrison County area. KLTF is located in a studio facility at 16405 Haven Road, with its two sister stations. Its transmitter is east of Little Falls.

The station is currently owned by Little Falls Radio Corporation, and features programming from Cumulus Media, Fox Sports Radio and Salem Communications. KLTF is a member of the Minnesota News Network, providing state-level reporting alongside national updates from ABC Radio. It carries a program known as Minnesota Military Radio, which preserves the stories of veterans and provides updates from the Minnesota Department of Veterans Affairs. It also broadcasts Rural MN Radio, a production of the Center for Rural Policy and Development, which discusses legislative issues affecting rural residents.

== History ==
KLTF first signed on the air in 1950. The station's call letters are an abbreviation of its city of license (Little Falls). It is currently owned and operated by the Little Falls Radio Corporation, serving as the flagship AM outlet for a three-station cluster that includes sister stations KFML (94.1 FM) and WYRQ-FM (92.1 MHz). KLTF hosts Gordon Lommen and Harriet Turner were honored by the Governor of Minnesota in 1976 for their "yeoman service" during the 1972 regional floods.
