= St. Joseph's Church (Pierz, Minnesota) =

Historic church in Minnesota, United States

- St. Joseph's Church--Catholic
- U.S. National Register of Historic Places
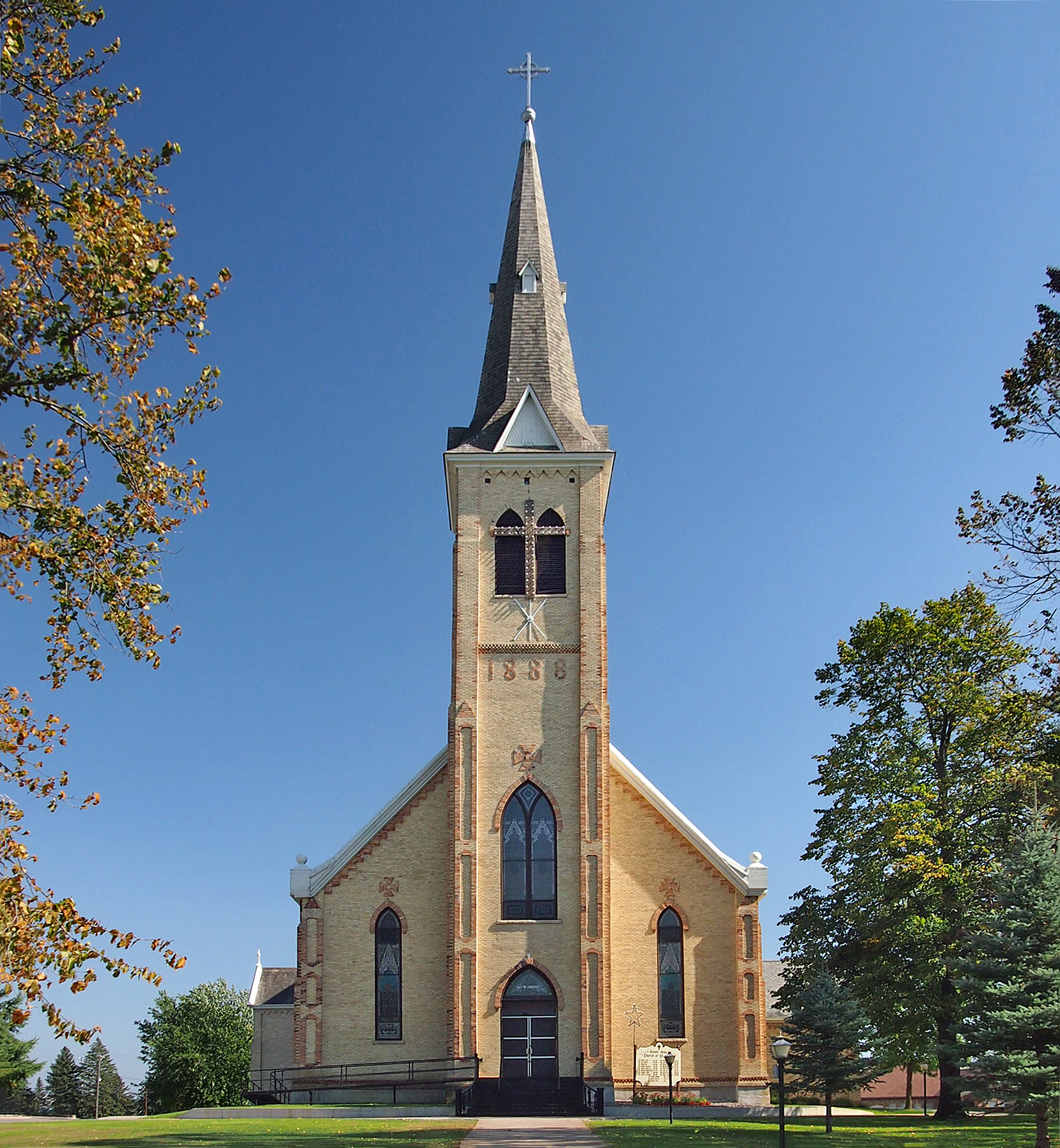
- St. Joseph's Church from the west

- Location within Minnesota Location within the United States
- Location: Main St., Pierz, Minnesota
- Coordinates: 45°58′48″N 94°6′12″W
- Area: 3.3 acres (1.3 ha)
- Built: 1886–88
- Architectural style: Gothic Revival
- NRHP reference No.: 85001998
- Added to NRHP: September 5, 1985

St. Joseph's Church-Catholic is a historic church on Main Street in Pierz, Minnesota, United States. It was built 1886–1888 and was added to the National Register of Historic Places in 1985.

The history of the parish dates back to 1865, when Reverend Francis Xavier Pierz started ministering to the community of Rich Prairie—as it was then known—along with Joseph F. Busch, Ignatius Tomazin, and James Trobec. In the fall of 1869 the community erected a log church building as Catholics were beginning to populate the area. Reverend Pierz became the resident pastor in 1871 and remained until 1873, when he retired to Slovenia. The town was later renamed to Pierz in honor of Reverend Pierz. Reverend Paneratins Maebren became the pastor of the church in 1884, and presided over it when the cornerstone of the new building was laid in 1886. The church was dedicated on December 25, 1888.
