= United States Parole Commission Extension Act of 2013 =

- Long title: To provide for the continued performance of the functions of the United States Parole Commission, and for other purposes.
- Enacted by: the 113th United States Congress

Citations
- Public law: Pub. L. 113–47 (text) (PDF)
- Statutes at Large: 127 Stat. 572

Codification
- Acts amended: Sentencing Reform Act of 1984
- U.S.C. sections amended: 18 U.S.C. § 3551, 18 U.S.C. ch. 311

Legislative history
- Introduced in the House as H.R. 3190 by Rep. Steve Chabot (R, OH-1) with 4 co-sponsors on September 26, 2013; Committee consideration by House Judiciary; House Subcommittee on Crime, Terrorism, Homeland Security and Investigations; Passed the House on October 14, 2013 (unanimous consent); Passed the Senate on October 30, 2013 (unanimous consent); Signed into law by President Barack Obama on October 31, 2013

The United States Parole Commission Extension Act of 2013 (H.R. 3190) is a federal law that extended the existence of the United States Parole Commission an additional five years until November 2018. The law also requires the Commission to file a report with Congress on their activities. The United States Parole Commission is the parole board responsible to grant or deny parole and to supervise those released on parole to incarcerated individuals who come under its jurisdiction. It is part of the United States Department of Justice.

== Provisions of the bill ==
The United States Parole Commission Extension Act of 2013 extends the existence of the United States Parole Commission for another 5 years. It does this by amending the Sentencing Reform Act of 1984 (18 U.S.C. § 3551 note; Public law 98-473). The law requires the Parole Commission to write a report for the United States House Committee on the Judiciary and the United States Senate Committee on the Judiciary about the parole commission and its activities. Seventeen different items are required in this report, including information about the number of record reviews done, the number of offenders the commission has jurisdiction over, the number of hearings held, and their expenditures.

== Procedural history ==
The United States Parole Commission Extension Act of 2013 was introduced into the United States House of Representatives on September 26, 2013 by Rep. Steve Chabot (R, OH-1). It was referred to the United States House Committee on the Judiciary and the United States House Judiciary Subcommittee on Crime, Terrorism, Homeland Security and Investigations. On October 14, 2013, the House voted to pass the bill by unanimous consent. The United States Senate voted on October 30, 2013 to pass the bill by unanimous consent, and the bill was signed into law by President Barack Obama on October 31, 2013, extending the life of the U.S. Parole Commission until November 2018.

== Debate and discussion ==
Senator Patrick Leahy argued in favor of the bill for reasons of public safety. According to Leahy, "the consequences of failing to reauthorize the Commission would be dire," because without the Commission to provide parole hearings, 3,500 inmates would be released.

== See also ==
- List of bills in the 113th United States Congress
- United States Parole Commission
