= Morrison County Courthouse =

- U.S. National Register of Historic Places
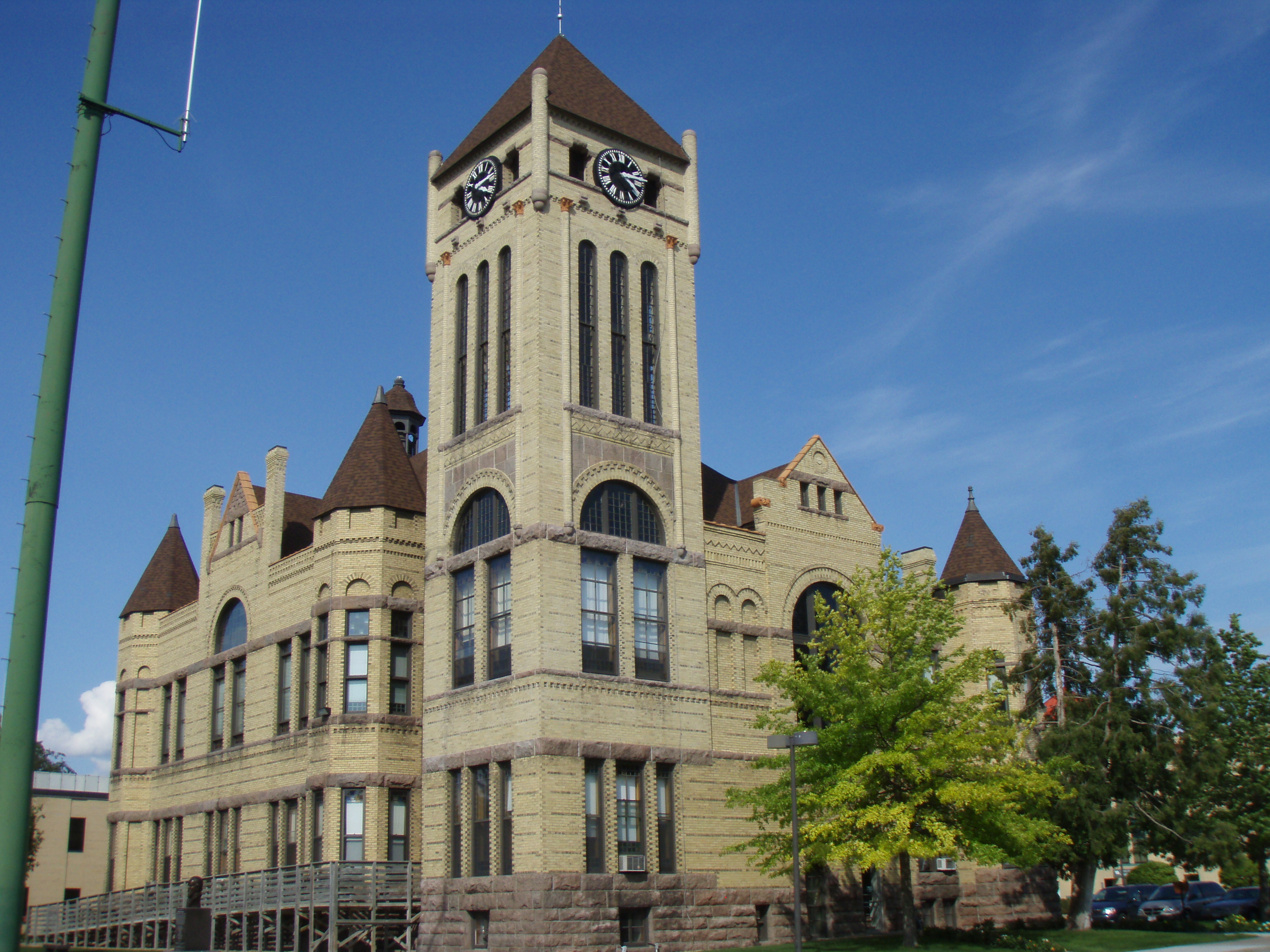
- Exterior of the courthouse

- Location within Minnesota Location within the United States
- Interactive map showing the location of Morrison County Courthouse
- Location: 107 2nd St. SE, Little Falls, Minnesota
- Coordinates: 45°58′32″N 94°21′38″W
- Area: 1 acre (0.40 ha)
- Built: 1890–91
- Architect: C.A. Dunham; Foster & Smith
- Architectural style: Richardsonian Romanesque
- NRHP reference No.: 78001552
- Added to NRHP: December 5, 1978

The Morrison County Courthouse is a historic courthouse in Little Falls, Minnesota. The building was completed in 1890 or 1891 and still serves as the county courthouse today. The courthouse was added to the National Register of Historic Places on December 5, 1978, due to its Richardsonian Romanesque architectural style and the fact that it is made completely of local material.

== Description ==
The courthouse, located near the central business district of Little Falls, was built in the Richardsonian Romanesque style using cream-colored bricks and gray granite. Many distinctive features make up the design, which include complex rooflines, various towers, decorative gables, multi-colored facades, semicircular arched windows and doors, as well as the usage of stained glass. Granite is used for the foundation. Granite is also used for banding, which feature decorations with historical subjects. The material is used for window sills, lintels, and arches over the two primary entryways as well. The four-story clock tower is the dominant feature of the building. It has a square plan and a hip roof. Roofing of the entire building is sheathed using slate shingles. Inside the courthouse, facilities for county offices, penal system, courts, welfare department and superintendent of schools are present. The courtroom and adjoining judge's chambers, along with the jury room, are on the second floor of the building. Oak woodwork can be found throughout the interior. The structural system is also wood. Offices and the courthouse within the building have a fireplace with a uniquely-designed mantel and decorative hearth. In addition, offices and the second floor have maple wood flooring. The main foyer has octagonal ceramic tile flooring. Glass concourses connect the three portions of the building.

== History ==
Morrison County was established in 1856. At its foundation, $8,000 was issued from the county in the form of bonds to build a courthouse. Only one room could be used by 1860 and by 1869, the courtroom was finished. This courthouse, however, was a frame building and proved inadequate for the county's needs. So, in 1890-91, a new courthouse was constructed. Designed by C.A. Dunham and built by Minneapolis-based Foster and Smith, the building was built in the Richardsonian Romanesque style and cost $55,000. Citizens voted to keep this design in the 1950s and again in 1969. They also decided that any additions should be in the form of annexes. 1961 saw the addition of a rectangular two-story on the north side of the building, costing $187,519. Another addition was made in 1969, a matching brick annex was built in the northeast corner of the building, this time costing $500,000. The oak used in the building was restored in 1978, the same year the building was added to the NRHP.
