= United States Parole Commission =

U.S. federal parole board

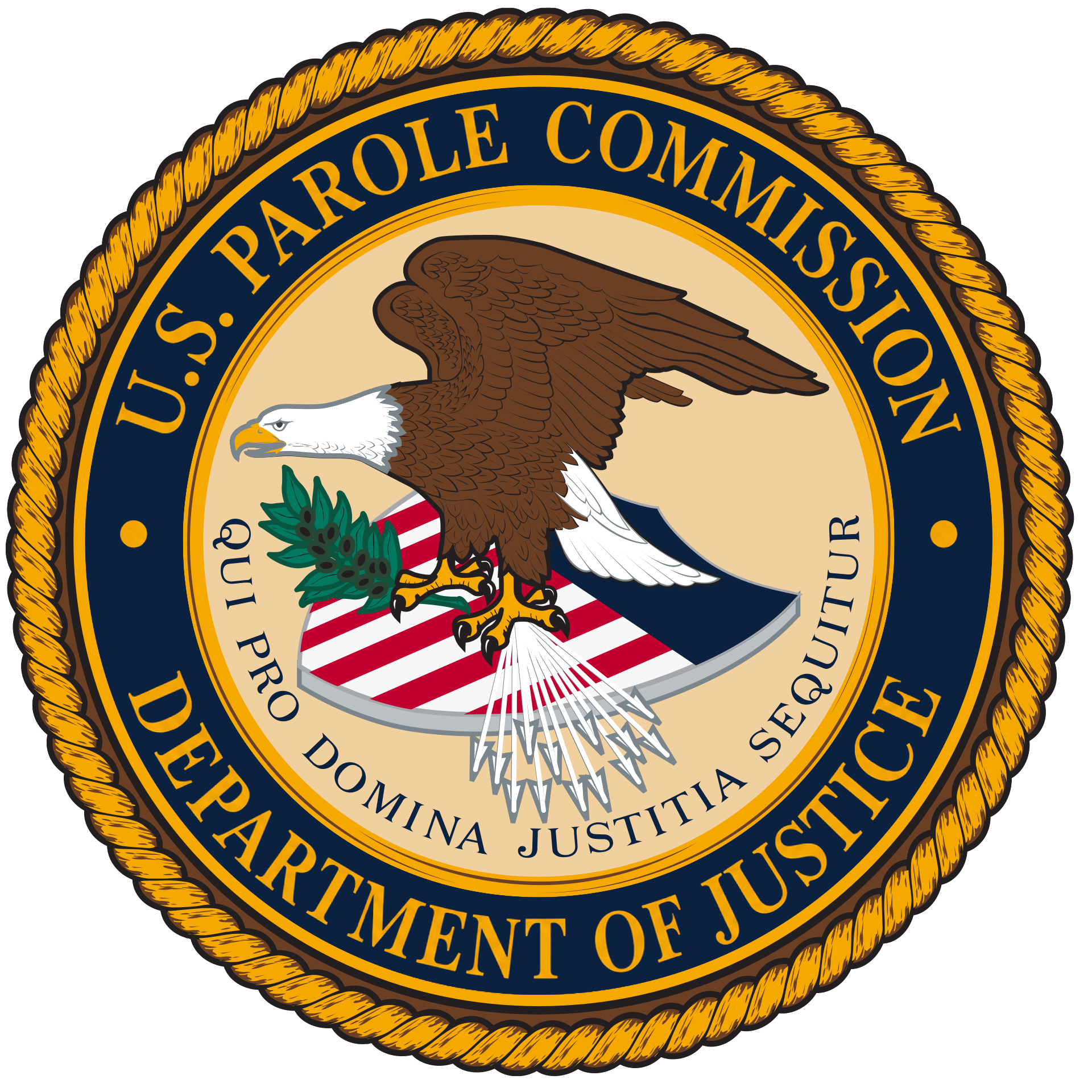

Agency overview
- Formed: 13 May 1930
- Jurisdiction: United States federal government
- Headquarters: Washington, D.C.
- Employees: 50
- Agency executive: Vacant, Chairman
- Website: justice.gov/uspc

The United States Parole Commission is the parole board responsible for granting or denying parole to, and supervising the parole releases of, incarcerated individuals who fall under its jurisdiction. It is part of the United States Department of Justice.

== Jurisdiction ==
The commission has jurisdiction over:

1. Persons who committed a federal offense before November 1, 1987
2. Persons who committed a D.C. Code offense before August 5, 2000
3. Persons who committed a Uniform Code of Military Justice offense and are parole-eligible
4. Persons who are serving prison terms imposed by foreign countries and have been transferred to the United States to serve their sentence

Additionally, the Commission has the responsibility to supervise two additional groups for whom they do not have parole jurisdiction:

1. Persons who committed a D.C. Code offense after August 4, 2000
2. Persons who have been placed on probation or paroled by a state that have also been placed in the United States Federal Witness Protection Program.

== History ==
Initially known as the United States Board of Parole, the board had three members and was established by legislation on May 13, 1930 as an independent board. The first chairperson was Arthur DeLacy Wood. As a result of an order of the Attorney General, the Board began reporting directly to him in August 1945. Further legislation was passed on September 30, 1950 which placed the Board under the Department of Justice.

Congress passed the Parole Commission and Reorganization Act which took effect in May 1976. The Board was re-titled the United States Parole Commission. The Act also incorporated the regions that had been established by a prior pilot project, required explicit guidelines for decision making, required written rejections, and established an appeal process. The Comprenhensive Crime Control Act of 1984 brought major changes to the Commission. While preserving the Commission's jurisdiction over persons who committed offenses prior to November 1, 1987, it established determinate sentences for federal crimes; thus federal prisoners after that date are not eligible for parole consideration.

Although the Commission was to be abolished in 1992, the life of the Commission was extended by the Judicial Improvements Act of 1990, the Parole Commission Phaseout Act of 1996, and the 21st Century Department of Justice Appropriations Authorization Act of 2002. The 1996 act required the Attorney General to report annually beginning in 1998 on whether the Commission remained cost effective. The 2002 act extended the life of the commission until November 2005.

The "United States Parole Commission Extension and Sentencing Commission Authority Act of 2005", Pub. L. No. 109-76, 119 Stat. 2035, extended the life of the USPC until November 2008.

The "United States Parole Commission Extension Act of 2008", Pub. L. No. 110-312, 122 Stat. 3013, extended the life of the USPC until November 2011.

The "United States Parole Commission Extension Act of 2011", Pub. L. No. 112–44, 125 Stat. 532, extended the life of the USPC until November 2013.

The United States Parole Commission Extension Act of 2013, Pub. L. No. 113-47, 127 Stat. 572, extended the life of the USPC until November 2018.

The "United States Parole Commission Extension Act of 2018", Pub. L. No. 115-274, 132 Stat. 4163, extended the life of the USPC until November 2020.

The "United States Parole Commission Extension Act of 2020", Sec. 4201-4203 of the "Continuing Appropriations Act, 2021 and Other Extensions Act", Pub. L. No. 116-159, 134 Stat. 709, extended the life of the USPC until November 2022.

The "Extension of existence of Parole Commission" Sec. 5011 of the "Consolidated Appropriations Act, 2026" Pub. L. 119–75, 140 Stat. 630, extended the life of the USPC until January 30, 2031.

== Commissioners ==
The commissioners as of July 12, 2022 are:

Position	Name	Took office	Term expires	Appointed By
Chair	Vacant			
Commissioner	Charles T. Massarone	August 16, 2012	August 16, 2018	Barack Obama
Commissioner	Vacant			
Commissioner	Vacant			
Commissioner	Vacant			

=== Nominations ===
President Trump has nominated the following to fill seats on the commission. They await Senate confirmation.

Name	Term expires	Replacing
Stephen Husk	After six years	Patricia Cushwa

== See also ==
- Federal parole in the United States
