= Little Falls, Minnesota =

City in Minnesota, United States

- City
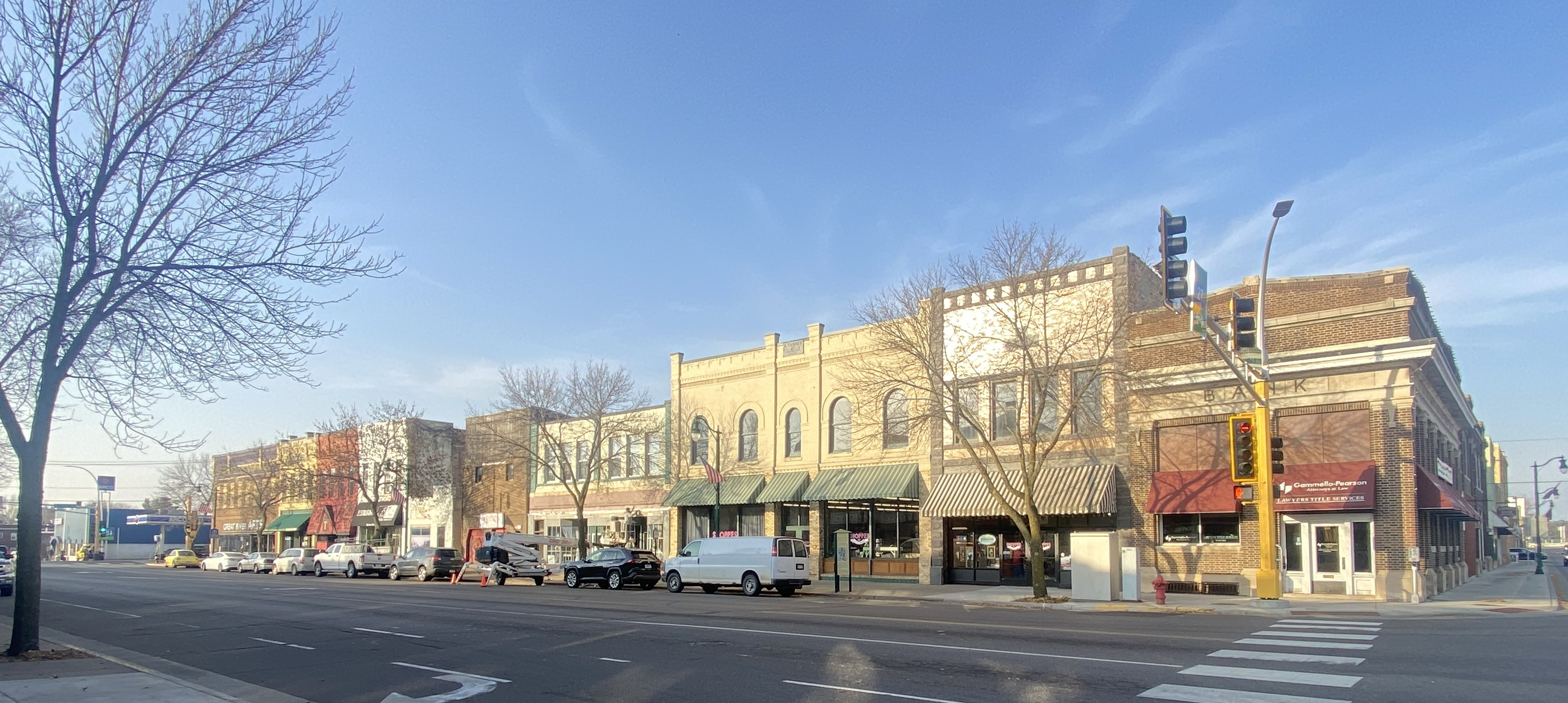
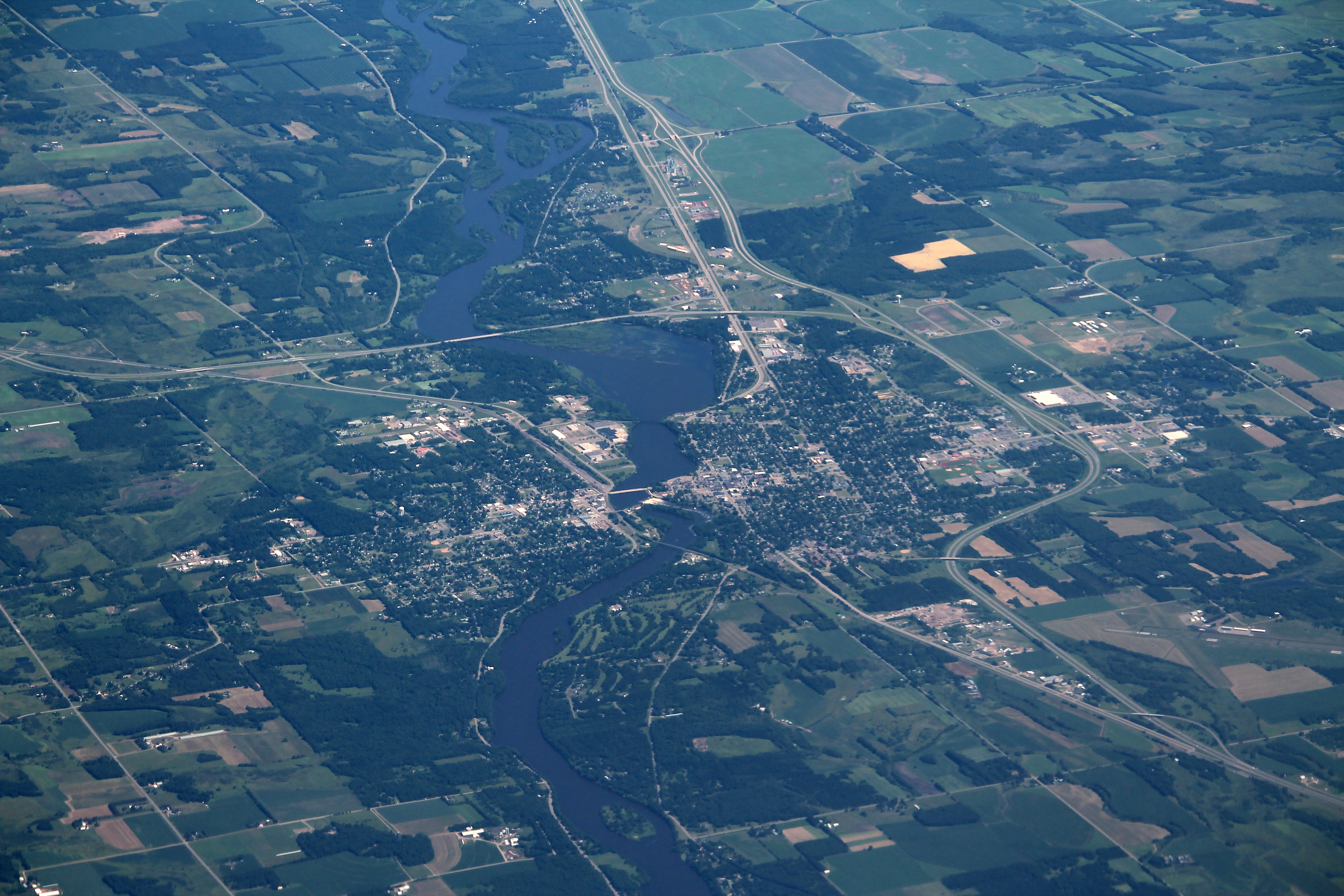
- Downtown Little Falls Aerial view of Little Falls
- Motto: A Place to Call Home
- Interactive map of Little Falls, Minnesota
- Location within Minnesota
- Coordinates: 45.9877°N 94.3548°W
- Country: United States
- State: Minnesota
- County: Morrison
- First Settled: 1848
- Platted: 1855
- Incorporated (village): February 25, 1879
- Incorporated (city): July 1890
- Founder: James Fergus
- Named for: The Natural Rapids and 11-foot drop

Government
  - Type: Mayor–Council
  - Mayor: Greg Zylka
  - President: Jerry Knafla
  - At Large: Dave Glaze
  - Councilmembers: Raquel Lundberg; Wayne Liljegren; David Meyer; Leif Hanson; Frank Gosiak

Area
  - Total: 8.957 sq mi (23.199 km^{2})
  - Land: 8.044 sq mi (20.835 km^{2})
  - Water: 0.913 sq mi (2.364 km^{2}) 10.19%
- Elevation: 1,106 ft (337 m)

Population (2020)
  - Total: 9,140
  - Estimate (2025): 9,277
  - Density: 1,140/sq mi (439/km^{2})
- Time zone: UTC–6 (Central (CST))
  - Summer (DST): UTC–5 (CDT)
- ZIP Code: 56345
- Area code: 320
- FIPS code: 27-37556
- GNIS feature ID: 2395734
- Highways: US 10, MN 27, MN 371
- Website: cityoflittlefalls.com

Little Falls is a city and the county seat of Morrison County, Minnesota, United States, near the geographic center of the state. The population was 9,140 as of the 2020 census, and was estimated at 9,277 in 2025. Little Falls was the boyhood home of noted aviator Charles Lindbergh. Just across from his former home is Charles A. Lindbergh State Park, named after Lindbergh's father, prominent Minnesota lawyer and U.S. Congressman Charles August Lindbergh.

== History ==
The town developed at falls on the Mississippi River and was named after them. Several different dams have been built over the falls during the town's history, some of which powered sawmills in the 19th century. Today, the Little Falls Dam is a hydroelectric station that generates power for the surrounding area.

According to the obituary of the Ojibwe war chief Mou-zoo-mau-nee, the people of Little Falls asked the Ojibwe for protection in 1862 during the Sioux Uprising. The Ojibwe sent 150 warriors.

=== Pine Tree Lumber Company ===
Beginning in the 1890s, lumber barons Charles Weyerhaeuser and Richard Drew (R.D.) Musser headquartered the Pine Tree Lumber Company in Little Falls. They bought a large tract of forested Northern Pacific Railway land and purchased the old N.P. Clark Mill on the east side of the Mississippi River, and 48 acres on the west side to build a new lumber mill. Weyerhaeuser and Musser commissioned Clarence H. Johnston Sr. to build mansions for them and their families, on a 20-acre site on the riverbank which later became "Linden Hill". Throughout the following decades, the two families became involved in local civic organizations, including the Musical Arts Club.

Weyerhaeuser and Musser began expanding business into Idaho and Washington; in 1904, Weyerhaeuser left Little Falls for Washington, and in 1910 the businessmen sold Pine Tree Lumber. The population had doubled in the decade after the business's establishment, with many drawn to the lumber industry. By 1920, the company had exhausted the surrounding lumber supply. The city's lumber mill closed, the Weyerhaeuser family left the city, and the Musser family remained in the area.

== Geography ==
Little Falls is located slightly west of the geographic center of Morrison County and sits on both sides of the Mississippi River, with the downtown area on the east side. The city is 33 miles (53 km) north (upriver) of St. Cloud and 31 miles (50 km) south (downriver) of Brainerd.

U.S. Highway 10 and Minnesota State Highways 27 and 371 are three of the main routes in the city. US 10 leads south to St. Cloud and northwest 30 miles (48 km) to Motley; Highway 27 leads east 13 miles (21 km) to Pierz and west 24 miles (39 km) to Long Prairie; and Highway 371 leads north to the Brainerd area.

Little Falls is the eastern terminus of Minnesota Highway 28, which heads to Browns Valley at its western terminus at the Minnesota–South Dakota border. Highway 28 is co-signed with Highway 27, 12 miles west of town, until it turns towards Swanville. Highway 28 is unsigned until outside the city limits. State Highway 238 is also nearby, linking Minnesota Highway 27 at Little Falls to Interstate 94 (I-94) in Albany, 35 miles (56 km) south of Little Falls.

According to the United States Census Bureau, the city has an area of 8.957 square miles (23.20 km^{2}), of which 8.044 square miles (20.83 km^{2}) is land and 0.913 square miles (2.36 km^{2}) (10.19%) is water.

A large ravine used to run through the east side business district, past the Morrison County Courthouse and the original Little Falls City Hall. The ravine served as an outflow for excess water from Fletcher Creek, which flows into the Mississippi River approximately 6 miles (10 km) north of the city. Filling of the ravine began in the 1880s, to allow city development, and continued until the 1950s. It was directly filled with dirt in some locations, while in other places, buildings were built over the ravine.

== Demographics ==
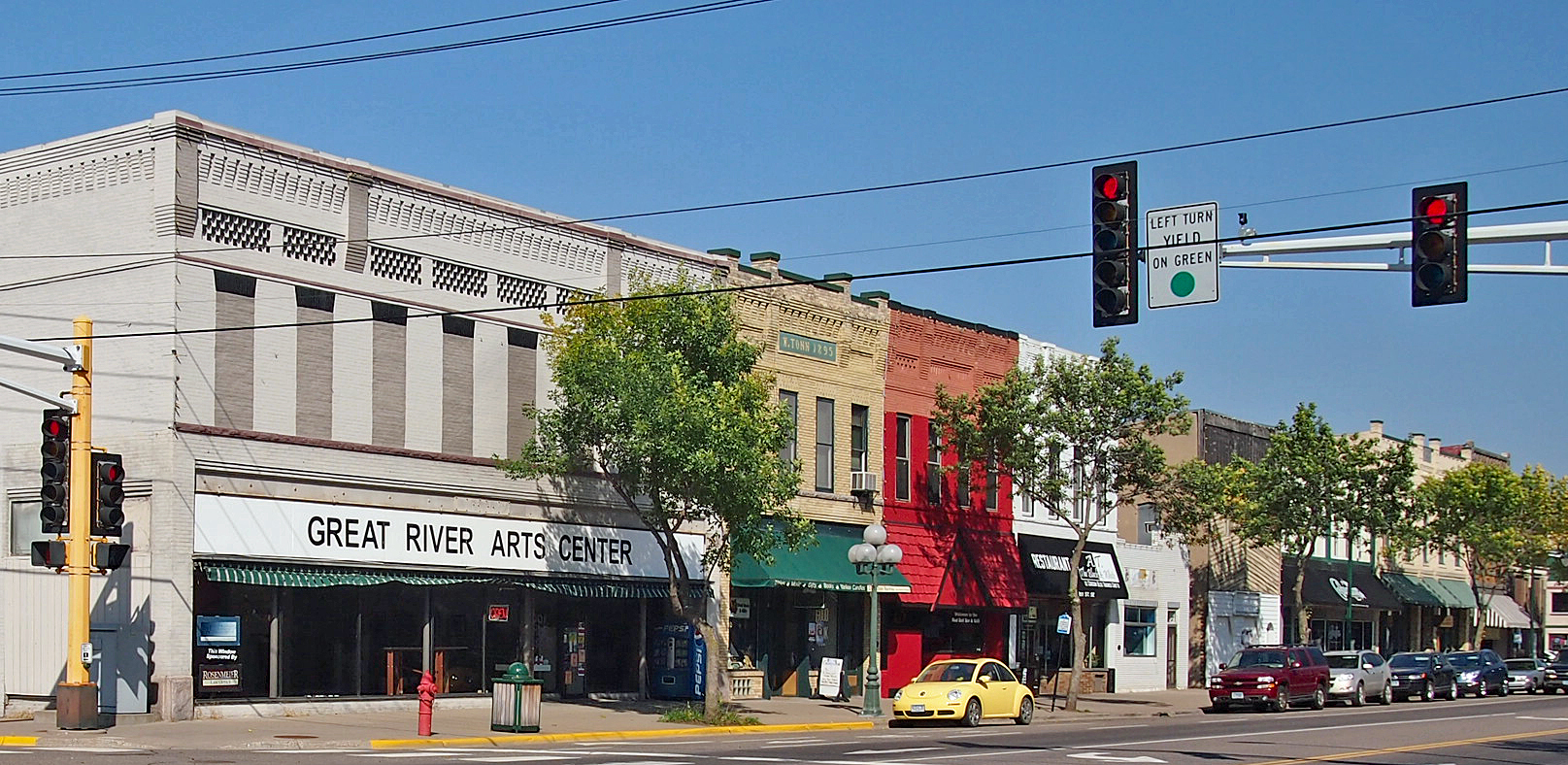
Downtown Little Falls

Historical population
Census	Pop.	Note	%±
1880	508		—
1890	2,354		363.4%
1900	5,774		145.3%
1910	6,078		5.3%
1920	5,500		−9.5%
1930	5,014		−8.8%
1940	6,047		20.6%
1950	6,717		11.1%
1960	7,551		12.4%
1970	7,467		−1.1%
1980	7,250		−2.9%
1990	7,232		−0.2%
2000	7,719		6.7%
2010	8,343		8.1%
2020	9,140		9.6%
2025 (est.)	9,277		1.5%
U.S. Decennial Census; 2020 Census

According to realtor website Zillow, the average price of a home as of August 31, 2026, in Little Falls was $281,100.

As of the 2024 American Community Survey, there were 4,106 estimated households in Little Falls with an average of 2.12 persons per household. The city has a median household income of $47,863. Approximately 18.7% of the city's population lives at or below the poverty line. Little Falls has an estimated 49.5% employment rate, with 22.6% of the population holding a bachelor's degree or higher and 92.5% holding a high school diploma. There were 4,249 housing units at an average density of 528.22 per square mile (203.95/km^{2}).

The top five reported languages (people were allowed to report up to two languages, thus the figures will generally add to more than 100%) were English (96.5%), Spanish (2.6%), Indo-European (0.1%), Asian and Pacific Islander (0.7%), and Other (0.0%).

The median age in the city was 40.9 years.

Little Falls, Minnesota – racial and ethnic composition Note: the US Census treats Hispanic/Latino as an ethnic category. This table excludes Latinos from the racial categories and assigns them to a separate category. Hispanics/Latinos may be of any race.
Race / ethnicity (NH = non-Hispanic)	Pop. 1980	Pop. 1990	Pop. 2000	Pop. 2010	Pop. 2020
White alone (NH)	7,138 (98.46%)	7,106 (98.26%)	7,452 (96.54%)	7,939 (95.16%)	8,358 (91.44%)
Black or African American alone (NH)	0 (0.00%)	20 (0.28%)	38 (0.49%)	66 (0.79%)	133 (1.46%)
Native American or Alaska Native alone (NH)	13 (0.18%)	45 (0.62%)	39 (0.51%)	31 (0.37%)	39 (0.43%)
Asian alone (NH)	57 (0.79%)	20 (0.28%)	38 (0.49%)	45 (0.54%)	41 (0.45%)
Pacific Islander alone (NH)	—	—	5 (0.06%)	1 (0.01%)	4 (0.04%)
Other race alone (NH)	37 (0.51%)	4 (0.06%)	2 (0.03%)	2 (0.02%)	15 (0.16%)
Mixed race or multiracial (NH)	—	—	64 (0.83%)	143 (1.71%)	343 (3.75%)
Hispanic or Latino (any race)	5 (0.07%)	37 (0.51%)	81 (1.05%)	116 (1.39%)	207 (2.26%)
Total	7,250 (100.00%)	7,232 (100.00%)	7,719 (100.00%)	8,343 (100.00%)	9,140 (100.00%)

=== 2020 census ===
As of the 2020 census, there were 9,140 people, 3,988 households, and 2,249 families residing in the city. The population density was 1,137.66 inhabitants per square mile (439.25/km^{2}). There were 4,243 housing units at an average density of 528.13 per square mile (203.91/km^{2}). The racial makeup of the city was 92.22% White, 1.47% African American, 0.51% Native American, 0.49% Asian, 0.05% Pacific Islander, 0.68% from some other races and 4.57% from two or more races. Hispanic or Latino people of any race were 2.26% of the population.

=== 2010 census ===
As of the 2010 census, there were 8,343 people, 3,608 households, and 2,055 families residing in the city. The population density was 1,152.99 inhabitants per square mile (445.17/km^{2}). There were 3,867 housing units at an average density of 534.41 per square mile (206.34/km^{2}). The racial makeup of the city was 96.14% White, 0.79% African American, 0.38% Native American, 0.54% Asian, 0.04% Pacific Islander, 0.22% from some other races and 1.89% from two or more races. Hispanic or Latino people of any race were 1.39% of the population.

There were 3,608 households, of which 27.2% had children under the age of 18 living with them, 38.1% were married couples living together, 13.5% had a female householder with no husband present, 5.3% had a male householder with no wife present, and 43.0% were non-families. 36.5% of all households were made up of individuals, and 17.2% had someone living alone who was 65 years of age or older. The average household size was 2.21 and the average family size was 2.85.

The median age in the city was 40.9 years. 22.2% of residents were under the age of 18; 8.6% were between the ages of 18 and 24; 23.4% were from 25 to 44; 25.2% were from 45 to 64; and 20.6% were 65 years of age or older. The gender makeup of the city was 46.9% male and 53.1% female.

=== 2000 census ===
As of the 2000 census, there were 7,719 people, 3,197 households, and 1,899 families residing in the city. The population density was 1,232.54 inhabitants per square mile (475.89/km^{2}). There were 3,358 housing units at an average density of 536.19 per square mile (207.02/km^{2}). The racial makeup of the city was 97.21% White, 0.49% African American, 0.52% Native American, 0.52% Asian, 0.06% Pacific Islander, 0.23% from some other races and 0.96% from two or more races. Hispanic or Latino people of any race were 1.05% of the population.

38.2% were of German, 16.5% Polish, 8.4% Norwegian and 7.8% Swedish ancestry.

There were 3,197 households, out of which 29.2% had children under the age of 18 living with them, 42.8% were married couples living together, 13.0% had a female householder with no husband present, and 40.6% were non-families. 36.0% of all households were made up of individuals, and 17.8% had someone living alone who was 65 years of age or older. The average household size was 2.29 and the average family size was 2.95.

In the city, the population was spread out, with 24.9% under the age of 18, 8.2% from 18 to 24, 25.7% from 25 to 44, 18.7% from 45 to 64, and 22.5% who were 65 years of age or older. The median age was 39 years. For every 100 females, there were 85.5 males. For every 100 females age 18 and over, there were 80.5 males.

The median income for a household in the city was $30,547, and the median income for a family was $40,298. Males had a median income of $30,925 versus $22,922 for females. The per capita income for the city was $15,924. About 9.2% of families and 15.9% of the population were below the poverty line, including 15.8% of those under age 18 and 23.1% of those age 65 or over.

== Transportation ==
Amtrak’s Empire Builder, which operates between Seattle/Portland and Chicago, passes through the town on BNSF tracks, but makes no stop. The nearest station is located in St. Cloud, 34 miles (55 km) to the south.

== Education ==
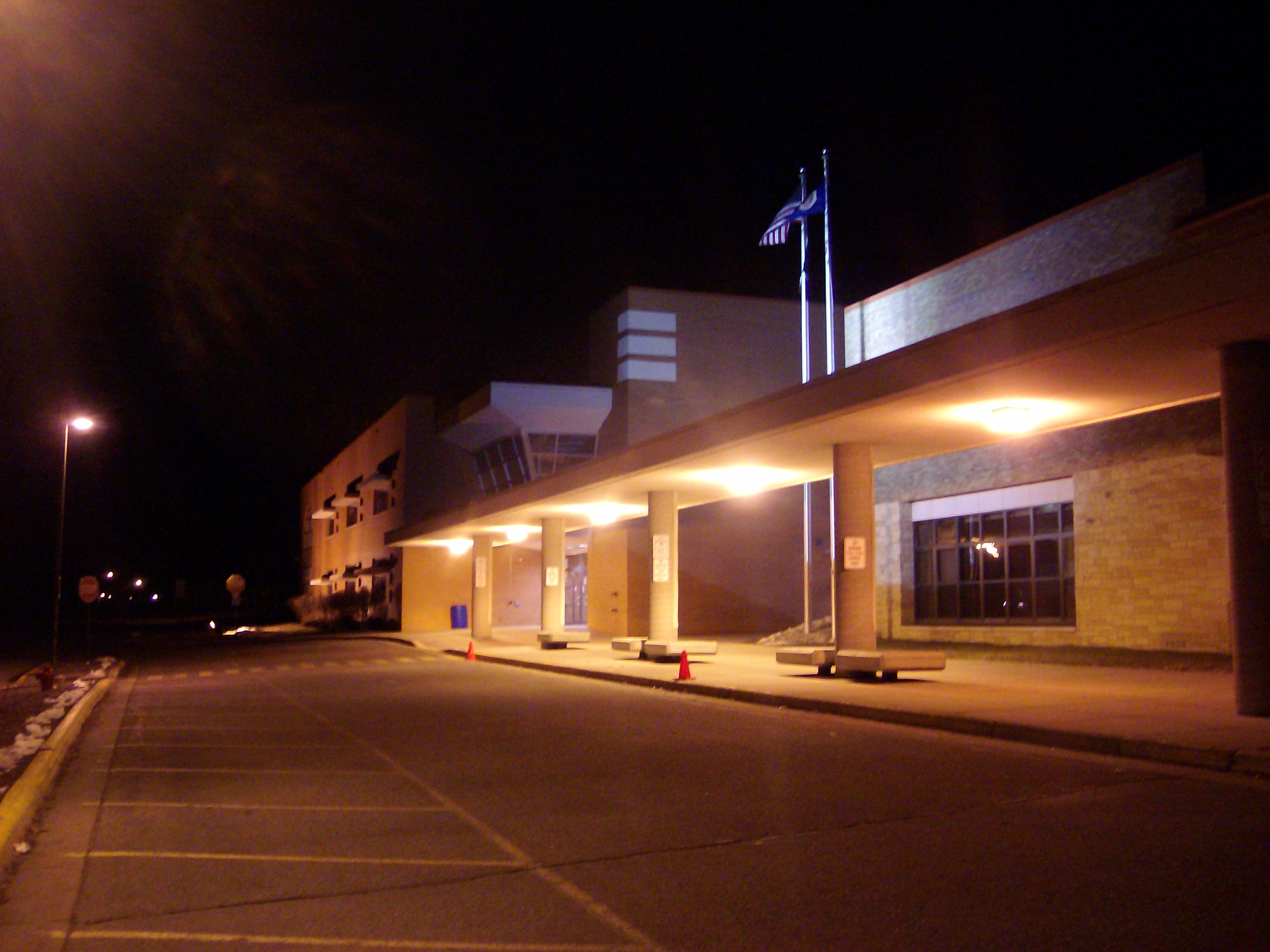
Lindbergh Elementary

Little Falls has several schools which include:

- Little Falls Community Schools (the public school system)
  - Lindbergh Elementary
  - Lincoln Elementary
  - Dr. S. G. Knight Elementary, a satellite school for the Little Falls district
  - Little Falls Community Middle School
  - Little Falls Community High School
  - Little Falls Continuing Education School
- Other
  - Mary of Lourdes School (pre-kindergarten through grade 8 but on two campuses) Catholic

== Attractions ==
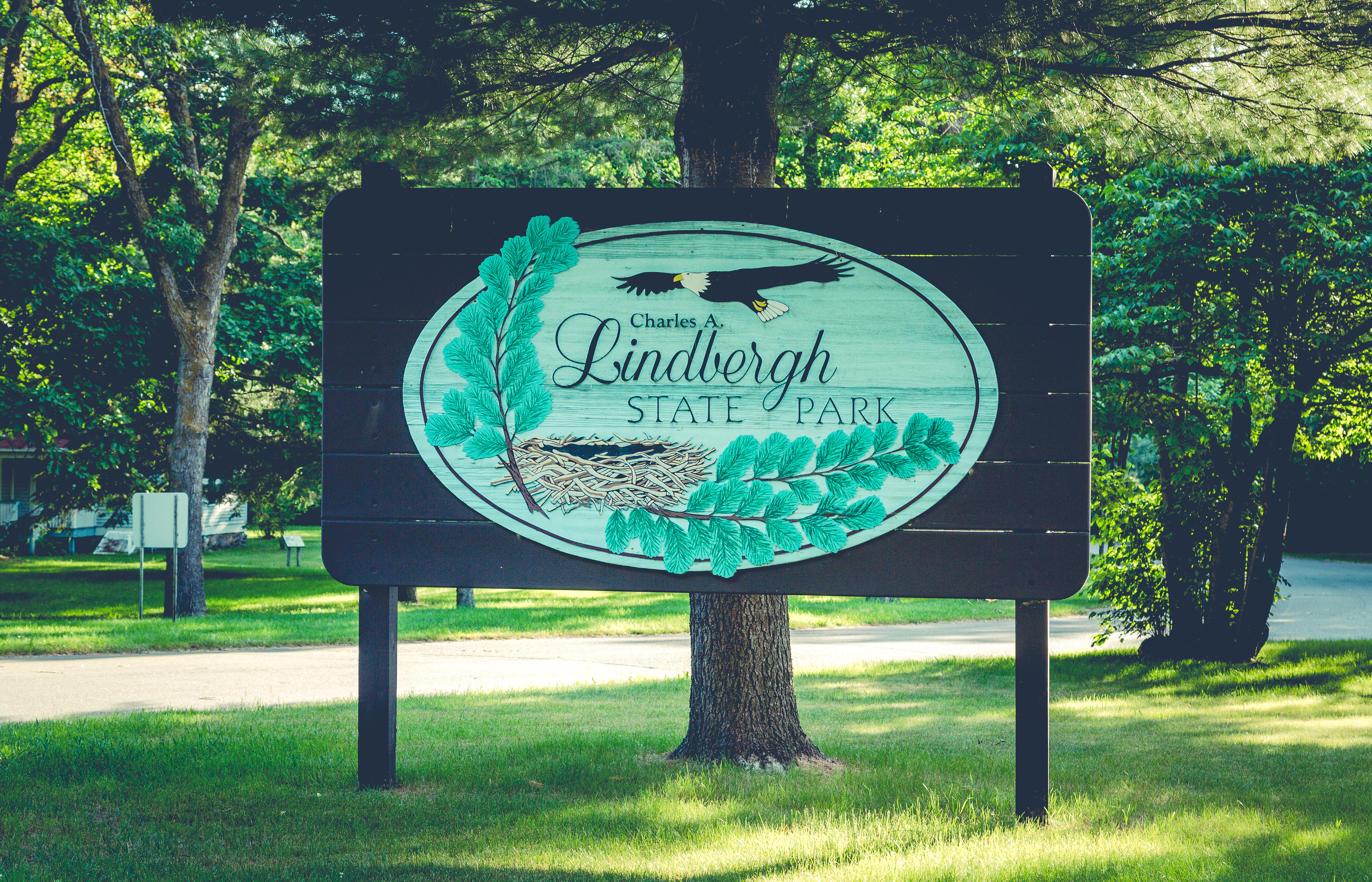
Entrance sign at Charles A. Lindbergh State Park

Charles A. Lindbergh State Park and Historical Site is on the Mississippi River. This 436 acres (1.76 km^{2}) park was established in 1931 in memory of United States Congressman and Minnesota lawyer Charles A. Lindbergh, Sr., also known as the father of aviator Charles Lindbergh. The historical site includes the home where the aviator spent summers next to the Mississippi River and a visitor center that tells the Lindbergh family story and displays a full-size replica of The Spirit of St. Louis cockpit. The home, with its original family furnishings and possessions, is open for informational tours.

Two large colored murals by Frank Gosiak depicting the logging era and Main Street of Little Falls in the early 1900s were painted on the façade of the Hennepin Paper Co. warehouse on Broadway Avenue West, across from Cass Gilbert Depot. A third Gosiak mural, Door Into the Past, depicts historic Little Falls and its development to the present day. The mural is on a building at the intersection of Broadway Avenue East and Second Street.

Two public frescoes were created at Lindbergh Elementary School by local artist Charles Kapsner. The first, The Stewardship, was completed in 1994 and portrays the values of Charles Lindbergh. It may be seen at all times of the day from 9th Street SE, as it is in a hall with glass to the exterior. The other fresco, Beginnings, is on an interior wall. It depicts the origins of Central Minnesota life and history.

Pine Grove Primeval Park and Zoo is on the west side of town, among pines in a 70-acre (280,000 m^{2}) park. It features a zoo, walking trails, picnic and playground area, a granite "council circle", and a rustic log shelter. The zoo is home to a variety of exotic, native and domestic animals, including cougars, bobcats, tigers, timber wolves, bears, pronghorn, bison, elk, white tail deer, prairie dogs, yaks and a petting stable.

On the southeast side of town is St. Francis Convent and Campus. It was founded in 1891 by the Roman Catholic order of Franciscan Sisters of the Immaculate Conception of Little Falls.

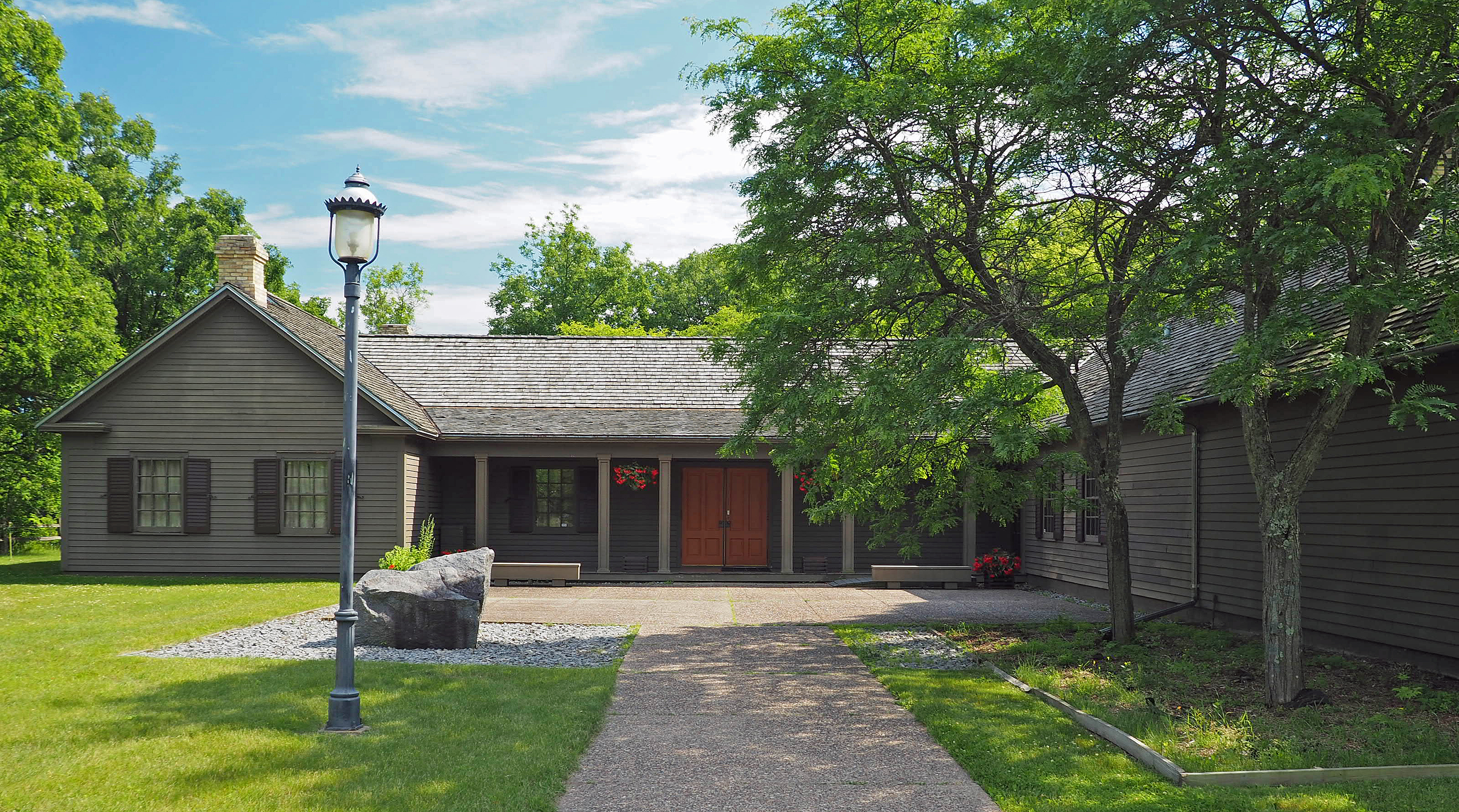
Weyerhaeuser Memorial Museum

The Morrison County Historical Society owns and operates The Charles A. Weyerhaeuser Memorial Museum, on the west side of the Mississippi River above the confluence of Pike Creek. Weyerhaeuser was a lumberman who managed the Pine Tree Lumber Company. The Weyerhaeuser Museum property adjoins the Charles A. Lindbergh Historic Site and Lindbergh State Park. The museum was built as the new home of the Morrison County Historical Society between 1974 and 1975, with the official dedication on August 24, 1975. Before that, the Morrison County Historical Society, which was founded in 1936, made its home in the basement of the Historic Morrison County Courthouse. The Weyerhaeuser Museum contains exhibits of three-dimensional artifacts and a full archive of documents, newspapers and photos related to county history. Museum grounds are home to natural prairie gardens, a Victorian-style fountain, and a gazebo overlooking the river. The Weyerhaeuser Museum is open year-round to visitors and researchers.

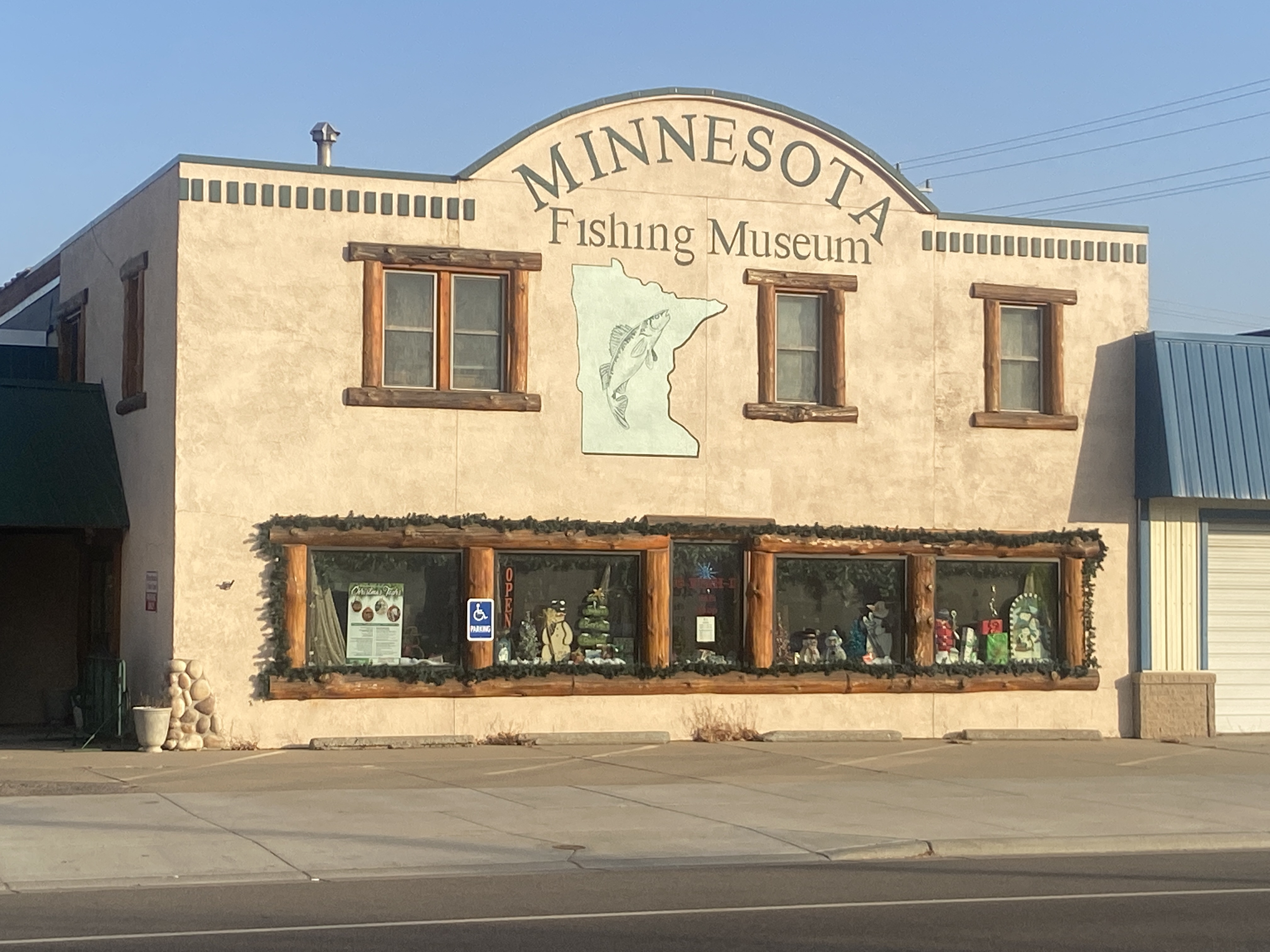
Minnesota Fishing Museum

The Minnesota Fishing Museum (MFM) is a nonprofit organization dedicated to preserving the heritage and history of freshwater fishing in Minnesota. It features over 8,000 artifacts in two large display rooms, the O'FISH-L Gift Shop, and tourism and DNR information. The MFM and the Minnesota Department of Natural Resources (DNR) partner in the MinnAqua education programs. The MFM is also host of the Let's Go Fishing Minnesota, Little Falls Chapter.

The Paul Larson Memorial Museum is a collection of boats, motors and trailers. Larson founded the Little Falls-based Larson Boats, as well as the Fred Larson Wildlife Animal Collection.

The Burton-Rosenmeier House was built in 1903 for Barney Burton. Burton, born to Isaac and Sarah Burton, was the seventh of eight children. At age 18, he moved from Wisconsin to St. Cloud, Minnesota, where he engaged in the clothing and men's furnishing business with his brother, Jacob, as a partner. In 1886, they moved their business to Little Falls, but in 1891 the brothers dissolved their partnership. Nevertheless, the business kept growing and the Barney Burton Clothing Store became the largest mercantile business in Morrison County. Burton married Sarah Deautsch, of Minneapolis, in 1894. She died after the birth of their daughter. In 1898, Barney married Josephine, a sister of Sarah, and had three children. At the turn of the century, they were becoming increasingly prosperous and began planning and building a home. In 1903, they started to build their house in the Classical Revival Style. Barney died of a heart attack in 1942 and Josephine died in 1953. Christian and Linda Rosenmeier moved to Little Falls in 1914 and resided in a flat over the Barney Burton Clothing Store. In 1921, they purchased the home with their three children, Gordon, Margaret and Donald, from the Burton family. Christian had a long career as an attorney, a president of the American National Bank and American Savings and Trust Company, and as a Minnesota state senator from 1922 to 1932. As a state senator, he was the author of the legislation, and helped in establishing Camp Ripley and Lindbergh State Park. Gordon Rosenmeier, Christian's oldest son, followed in his father's footsteps. In 1940, he was elected to the unexpired term of the late senator Fred Miller of Little Falls, and he served in the Minnesota State Senate under eight successive governors. During his three decades of service, he authored series of major bills. Gordon was also a corporate attorney for the local lumber barons R.D. Musser and C.A. Weyerheauser, whose mansions are on the adjacent property to the Rosenmeier estate. The Burton-Rosenmeier House serves as the Little Falls Convention and Visitors Bureau.

=== Linden Hill ===
Beginning in the 1890s, Richard Drew (R.D.) Musser managed Pine Tree Lumber, a lumber company in Little Falls, along with owner Charles Weyerhaeuser. By 1920, Musser and Weyerhaeuser had sold the company, but the Musser family remained at their estate. The Musser estate, called Linden Hill, stands on 1st St SE alongside the Mississippi River, adjacent to Maple Island Park. Musser's daughter Laura Jane became Linden Hill's sole heiress and proprietor in the 1950s. Laura Jane was a steadfast environmentalist and Native American rights advocate during her time as landowner from the 1950s to her death in 1989. She collaborated with the Mille Lacs Band of Ojibwe and the Native American Rights Fund, and frequently spoke out against Pine Tree Lumber's unjust, exploitative, and environmentally destructive practices.

In 1995, years after Laura Jane's death, Little Falls bought Linden Hill, with renovations paid for by the Musser family fund. However, operation became expensive, and the city council quietly voted to close the site in 2005. Many residents criticized the council's decision, and in February 2006 hundreds of citizens gathered to show their support for public ownership of the houses. In October 2007, an agreement was reached between the city and its citizens, and the houses were sold to the Friends of Linden Hill, a 501(c)(3) nonprofit organized by local activists. Today, the mansions are furnished with antiques and original belongings of the families who once occupied them. The estates are collectively known as the Linden Hill Historical Event Center. They are used for education, tours, overnight stays, conferences/retreats, weddings, family reunions and assorted special events.

== Events ==
=== Little Falls Dam Festival ===
Beginning in 2005, the Dam Festival is an annual event that takes place in Maple Island Park. The festival was founded by Richard John Lano of Crawfordsville, Indiana, who had relatives in Little Falls and Long Prairie, Minnesota. It is held at LeBourget Park and surrounding areas near the town's dam in late June. Activities include street dances, simple games, face painting, food, a petting zoo, pony rides, bingo, karaoke, a parade, and specialty shows. The event usually culminates with a fireworks show over the Mississippi River.

In June 2013, The Voice USA season 3 contestant Nicholas David performed a concert at the festival.

=== Little Falls Arts and Crafts Fair ===
The Arts and Craft Fair is an annual fair held the weekend after Labor Day. It is sponsored by the Little Falls Chamber of Commerce since 1972. This attracts numerous visitors and the town is bustling.

=== Rock the Park ===
Held every Summer during the month of June; typically towards the end of the month. Rock the Park is a unique concert experience because of its representation of local talent, most of the members in Brothers Tone and The Big Groove are from the Little Falls area. The event is completely funded by almost 30 local business sponsors.

=== Little Falls Antiques and Collectibles Fair ===
This event held the weekend after Labor Day as well. It is held at Le Bourget Park on the West Side of town. Sponsored by the West Side Improvement Association.

=== Lone Eagle Auto Club Car Show ===
Held the Sunday after Labor Day at the Morrison County Fairgrounds. Antique Car Show and swap meet.

=== Morrison County Fair ===
An annual fair held at the Morrison County Fairgrounds northeast of town.

=== Greater Minnesota Two-Cylinder Club Annual Field Days ===
The club hosts this show the First Weekend in May Annually out at the Morrison County Fairgrounds. It features plowing, a swap meet, consignment auction, flea market, antique tractor pull, and more!

== Media ==
The Morrison County Record is a weekly newspaper published in Little Falls.

Little Falls Radio Corporation consists of three stations:

- KLTF AM 960
- WYRQ FM 92.1
- KFML FM 94.1

Great River Television (GRTV), the Little Falls area's public-access cable TV station broadcast on channel 180, serves as a medium for community updates, airing biweekly Morrison County county commissioners and Little Falls city council meetings, as well as coverage of other local events, such as sports, concerts, parades, veterans information, fitness programs, and church services. Originally, the channel operated as Central Minnesota Access Television. The channel formerly broadcast out of the Little Falls Community High School, but has since transitioned to the Great River Arts Center in historic downtown of Little Falls.

== Notable people ==
- Frances Eliza Babbitt, 19th century teacher and archaeologist
- Greg Blaine, Minnesota state legislator, farmer, and businessman
- Duane Bobick, world champion amateur heavyweight boxer
- Joe Brinkman, American League baseball umpire
- Louise Erdrich, National Book Award novelist
- Gordon D. Gerling, Minnesota state legislator and businessman
- Gale Gillingham, five-time NFL All Pro guard, two-time Super Bowl champion, Green Bay Packers
- Ben Hanowski, member of the 2013 Calgary Flames
- Brian Kobilka, Nobel Prize-winning professor of chemistry
- Jim Langer, member of the Pro Football Hall of Fame
- Charles A. Lindbergh, first person to fly across the Atlantic Ocean in a solo, non-stop flight (1927)
- Christian Rosenmeier, lawyer and state senator
- Gordon Rosenmeier, lawyer and state senator; son of Christian
- John E. Simonett, lawyer and Minnesota Supreme Court justice
- Byron David Smith, veteran convicted of murdering burglars at his home
- William Stobb, poet
- George P. Wetzel, Sr., Minnesota state representative and jurist
- Arthur DeLacy Wood, chairperson of the United States Parole Commission
- Zachary Sobania, member of American boy band, Boy Throb
- Fred Zollner, founder of the Fort Wayne Pistons (now Detroit)

== Sister cities ==
- Le Bourget, France (since 1987)
