= Charles Rau =

American archaeologist (1826–1887)

- Born: January 1, 1826; Verviers, Belgium
- Died: July 25, 1887 (aged 61); Philadelphia, Pennsylvania, U.S.
- Education: University of Heidelberg
- Occupations: Archaeologist, Curator
- Employer(s): Smithsonian Institution, National Museum of the United States
- Known for: Curator at the Smithsonian Institution; Authority on American archaeology
- Notable work: Early Man in Europe (1876); The Palenque Tablet in the United States National Museum (1879); Articles on Anthropological Subjects, 1853-1877 (1882)
- Awards: Ph.D., University of Freiburg (1882)

Charles Rau (1826 Verviers, Belgium – 25 July 1887 Philadelphia) was an American archaeologist. He was a curator at the Smithsonian for more than a decade.

== Biography ==
He was educated at the University of Heidelberg and emigrated to the United States in 1848, where he engaged in teaching, first in the west, and later in New York City. Beginning in 1863, he contributed articles to the publications of the Smithsonian Institution, and subsequently his articles were published in nearly every annual report. From 1875 until his death, he was curator in the Department of Antiquities at the National Museum in Washington, D.C. and devoted himself to the study of American archaeology, on which he became a recognized authority. He wrote on American antiquities for Die Natur.

He was a member of the principal archaeological and anthropological societies of Europe and America. The University of Freiburg in Baden gave him the degree of Ph.D. in 1882. His great library and collections were bequeathed to the National Museum. Also in 1882, he was elected as a member of the American Philosophical Society.

== Writings ==
He published more than fifty papers. The titles of his books were:

- Early Man in Europe (1876) This was originally a series of articles contributed to Harper's Magazine.
- The Palenque Tablet in the United States National Museum (1879)
- Articles on Anthropological Subjects, 1853-1877 (1882)

He left unfinished a work on the types of early American implements, and what was projected to be an exhaustive record of American archaeology.
