= KFML (FM) =

KFML-FM
- Little Falls, Minnesota; United States
- Frequency: 94.1 MHz
- Branding: 94 Rocks

Programming
- Format: Active rock

Ownership
- Owner: Little Falls Radio Corporation
- Sister stations: WYRQ-FM, KLTF

History
- First air date: November 1988
- Call sign meaning: FM Little Falls

Technical information
- Licensing authority: FCC
- Facility ID: 37779
- Class: A
- ERP: 6,000 watts
- HAAT: 100 meters (330 ft)
- Transmitter coordinates: 46°0′15″N 94°19′40″W

Links
- Public license information: Public file; LMS
- Webcast: Listen live
- Website: fallsradio.com

KFML (94.1 FM, "94 Rocks") is a radio station licensed to Little Falls, Minnesota, United States.

From 1969-1975, the call letters belonged to a Denver, Colorado free-form underground station. In a later Minnesota incarnation, until June 2021, KFML carried a hot adult contemporary format with the branding "FM94" and slogan "More Music, More Variety". Its transmitter is located east of Little Falls, shared with KLTF.

Owned by Little Falls Radio Corporation, the station carries an active rock format. KFML is also the radio home for Pierz Pioneer sports. KFML and its two sister stations operate from studios at 16405 Haven Road, Little Falls. A signature program for the station is The Dark, an active rock block hosted by JZ that airs nightly. The show focuses on cutting-edge rock from the 2000s to the present, featuring bands such as Turnstile, Grey Daze, and Atreyu. The station is the home for Pierz Pioneer high school athletics, providing live play-by-play coverage for the regional community. It is an affiliate of the Minnesota News Network.

== History ==
It first signed on the air in November 1988.
