= Minnesota Graduation Standards =

The Minnesota Graduation Standards, also known as the Profile of Learning and the Minnesota Academic Standards, created in 1998, were intended to raise standards of education for Minnesota high school students. The Minnesota Graduation Standards were developed to ensure minimum competence in survival skills for all Minnesota graduates from high school. The standards included two parts: the Minnesota Statewide Assessments and the Minnesota Academic Standards.

== History ==
Historically, Minnesota high schools awarded diplomas based on Carnegie units ("seat time requirements") or course credits completed by students. Critics maintained that this system provided no statewide standards on subject content and no statewide assessment of what students learned. In the early 1990s, the Legislature, the Minnesota State Board of Education (abolished in 1998), and the Minnesota Department of Children, Families & Learning, (now the Department of Education) began working together to develop a more rigorous K-12 education system. The resulting graduation rule had two distinct components, the Basic Skills Tests and the Profile of Learning.

To graduate, students had to do two things: pass the Basic Skills Tests and successfully complete the minimum Profile of Learning standards requirements. Basic Skills Tests in reading, writing, and math were developed to ensure that students acquired the basic level of knowledge needed to function in a literate society. The Profile of Learning standards contained 10 learning areas, plus a requirement for vocational education. Detailed content standards were developed for each learning area. Elementary and middle school students had to master preparatory content standards. Initially, high school students had to complete 24 of 48 high school content standards to graduate.

== Debate ==
Developing and implementing the Profile of Learning generated much debate. Concerns with the content of the standards and with how the standards were taught led to a compromise, which gave local school boards the authority to decide which content standards students had to complete and how many standards were required for graduation. Districts were also able to select the assessment tools used to measure student performance. (Laws of Minnesota 2000, Chapter 500)

== Switch to Minnesota Academic Standards ==
Continuing debate about the Profile of Learning led to its repeal in 2003. It was replaced with the Minnesota Academic Standards (Laws of Minnesota 2003, Chapter 129). The new law defined five core academic content standards areas: language arts, math, science, social studies, and arts. Standards for mathematics, language arts, and arts were adopted in the 2003 law (The law allowed school districts to use either the statewide arts standards or locally developed arts standards).

In 2004, the Minnesota Department of Education adopted science and social studies standards through rule making. Each of the academic standards are supplemented by grade-level benchmarks. These benchmarks specify the academic knowledge and skills that students must achieve to complete a state standard. The standards and benchmarks will be reviewed on a four-year cycle beginning in the 2006–2007 school year.

In addition to the core academic standards areas, there are several elective subject areas. School districts must create local elective standards and must offer elective courses covering health and physical education, vocational and technical education, and world languages.

The legislation created a transition process for schools and students to move from the Profile of Learning to the Minnesota Academic Standards. School districts may switch to the new graduation system at any time but must continue to offer the old graduation standards to students who started ninth grade under those standards.

== Changes to the Basic Skills Tests ==
Changes were also made in the state's assessment system. The Basic Skills Tests (BST) have been replaced by the Minnesota Comprehensive Assessments (MCA-IIs). Starting with the class of 2010 (students entering grade eight in 2005–2006), students are required to pass the MCA-III test instead of the BST. The MCA-IIIs were developed to help schools and districts measure student progress in mastering the state's new reading, writing, and mathematics standards.

Students' performance on these statewide assessments can be used as one of multiple criteria to determine grade promotion or retention. To graduate, students will have to pass the MCA-II writing test given in grade nine (beginning in spring 2007), the MCA-II reading test given in grade ten (beginning in spring 2008), and the MCA-II math test given in grade 11 (beginning in spring 2009). All public schools and charter schools must administer the tests. Students must pass these required state exams, must successfully complete a required number of course credits, and must meet any local graduation requirements to graduate from a Minnesota public high school.

Graduation assessments: Students are not required to achieve a specified score or level of proficiency on any statewide assessment in order to graduate from high school.
