= Pierz, Minnesota =

City in Minnesota, United States

- City
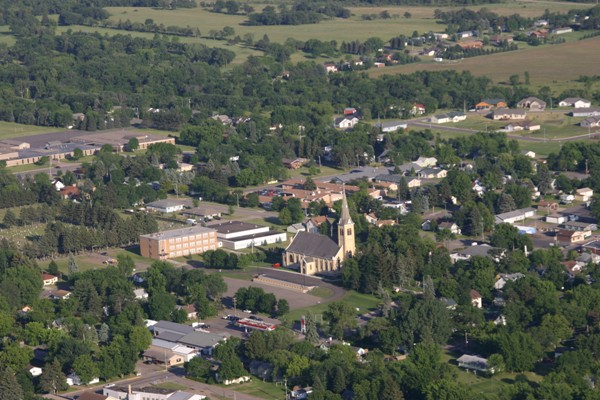
- Aerial view of Pierz, note St. Joseph's Church near the center

- Location in Morrison County and the state of Minnesota
- Coordinates: 45°58′38″N 94°06′03″W
- Country: United States
- State: Minnesota
- County: Morrison
- Founded: 1869

Area
  - Total: 1.38 sq mi (3.57 km^{2})
  - Land: 1.38 sq mi (3.57 km^{2})
  - Water: 0 sq mi (0.00 km^{2})
- Elevation: 1,175 ft (358 m)

Population (2020)
  - Total: 1,418
  - Density: 1,028.3/sq mi (397.04/km^{2})
- Time zone: UTC-6 (Central (CST))
  - Summer (DST): UTC-5 (CDT)
- ZIP code: 56364
- Area code: 320
- FIPS code: 27-50776
- GNIS feature ID: 2396202
- Website: www.pierzmn.org

Pierz is a city in Morrison County, Minnesota, United States. The population was 1,418 at the 2020 census.

== History ==
Pierz was named for Father Francis Xavier Pierz (Slovene: Franc Pirc), a Slovenian Roman Catholic priest who came to Minnesota in the early 1850s as a missionary to the native Ojibwe people. The town was incorporated on January 12, 1892, under the name "Rich Prairie", but on August 15, 1894, the residents voted to change the name to Pierz in F. X. Pierz's honor.

== Geography ==
Pierz is in eastern Morrison County. It is bordered to the south, east, and west by Pierz Township, also to the south by the city of Genola, and to the north by Buh Township. Minnesota State Highways 25 and 27 are the main routes in the city. MN 25 leads north 28 miles (45 km) to Brainerd and south 30 miles (48 km) to Foley, while MN 27 leads west 13 miles (21 km) to Little Falls, the Morrison county seat, and east-northeast 26 miles (42 km) to Onamia. Highways 25 and 27 leave Pierz together to the north, splitting 3 miles (5 km) north of town.

According to the U.S. Census Bureau, the city of Pierz has an area of 1.38 square miles (3.57 km^{2}), all of it recorded as land. The Skunk River passes through the southeast part of the city, flowing south and then west to join the Platte River, a south-flowing tributary of the Mississippi.

== Demographics ==
Historical population
| Census | Pop. | Note | %± |
|---|---|---|---|
| 1900 | 358 | | — |
| 1910 | 545 | | 52.2% |
| 1920 | 624 | | 14.5% |
| 1930 | 634 | | 1.6% |
| 1940 | 714 | | 12.6% |
| 1950 | 856 | | 19.9% |
| 1960 | 816 | | −4.7% |
| 1970 | 893 | | 9.4% |
| 1980 | 1,018 | | 14.0% |
| 1990 | 1,014 | | −0.4% |
| 2000 | 1,277 | | 25.9% |
| 2010 | 1,393 | | 9.1% |
| 2020 | 1,418 | | 1.8% |
U.S. Decennial Census

=== 2010 census ===
As of the census of 2010, there were 1,393 people, 585 households, and 339 families living in the city. The population density was 1,031.9 inhabitants per square mile (398.4/km^{2}). There were 605 housing units at an average density of 448.1 per square mile (173.0/km^{2}). The racial makeup of the city was 98.6% White, 0.1% Native American, 0.2% Asian, 0.1% from other races, and 0.9% from two or more races. Hispanic or Latino of any race were 0.6% of the population.

There were 585 households, of which 29.4% had children under the age of 18 living with them, 42.2% were married couples living together, 11.8% had a female householder with no husband present, 3.9% had a male householder with no wife present, and 42.1% were non-families. 37.8% of all households were made up of individuals, and 25.7% had someone living alone who was 65 years of age or older. The average household size was 2.23 and the average family size was 2.94.

The median age in the city was 42.5 years. 24.5% of residents were under the age of 18; 7.1% were between the ages of 18 and 24; 21.2% were from 25 to 44; 19.8% were from 45 to 64; and 27.3% were 65 years of age or older. The gender makeup of the city was 41.3% male and 58.7% female.

=== 2000 census ===
As of the census of 2000, there were 1,277 people, 512 households, and 321 families living in the city. The population density was 945.8 inhabitants per square mile (365.2/km^{2}). There were 522 housing units at an average density of 386.6 per square mile (149.3/km^{2}). The racial makeup of the city was 98.67% White, 0.39% Native American, and 0.94% from two or more races. Hispanic or Latino of any race were 0.08% of the population.

There were 512 households, out of which 28.7% had children under the age of 18 living with them, 48.8% were married couples living together, 11.9% had a female householder with no husband present, and 37.3% were non-families. 33.0% of all households were made up of individuals, and 22.5% had someone living alone who was 65 years of age or older. The average household size was 2.29 and the average family size was 2.91.

In the city, the population was spread out, with 23.6% under the age of 18, 8.2% from 18 to 24, 22.9% from 25 to 44, 15.2% from 45 to 64, and 30.1% who were 65 years of age or older. The median age was 41 years. For every 100 females, there were 79.4 males. For every 100 females age 18 and over, there were 72.1 males.

The median income for a household in the city was $27,292, and the median income for a family was $34,167. Males had a median income of $29,107 versus $21,250 for females. The per capita income for the city was $14,638. About 6.0% of families and 13.6% of the population were below the poverty line, including 12.7% of those under age 18 and 20.8% of those age 65 or over.

== Arts and culture ==
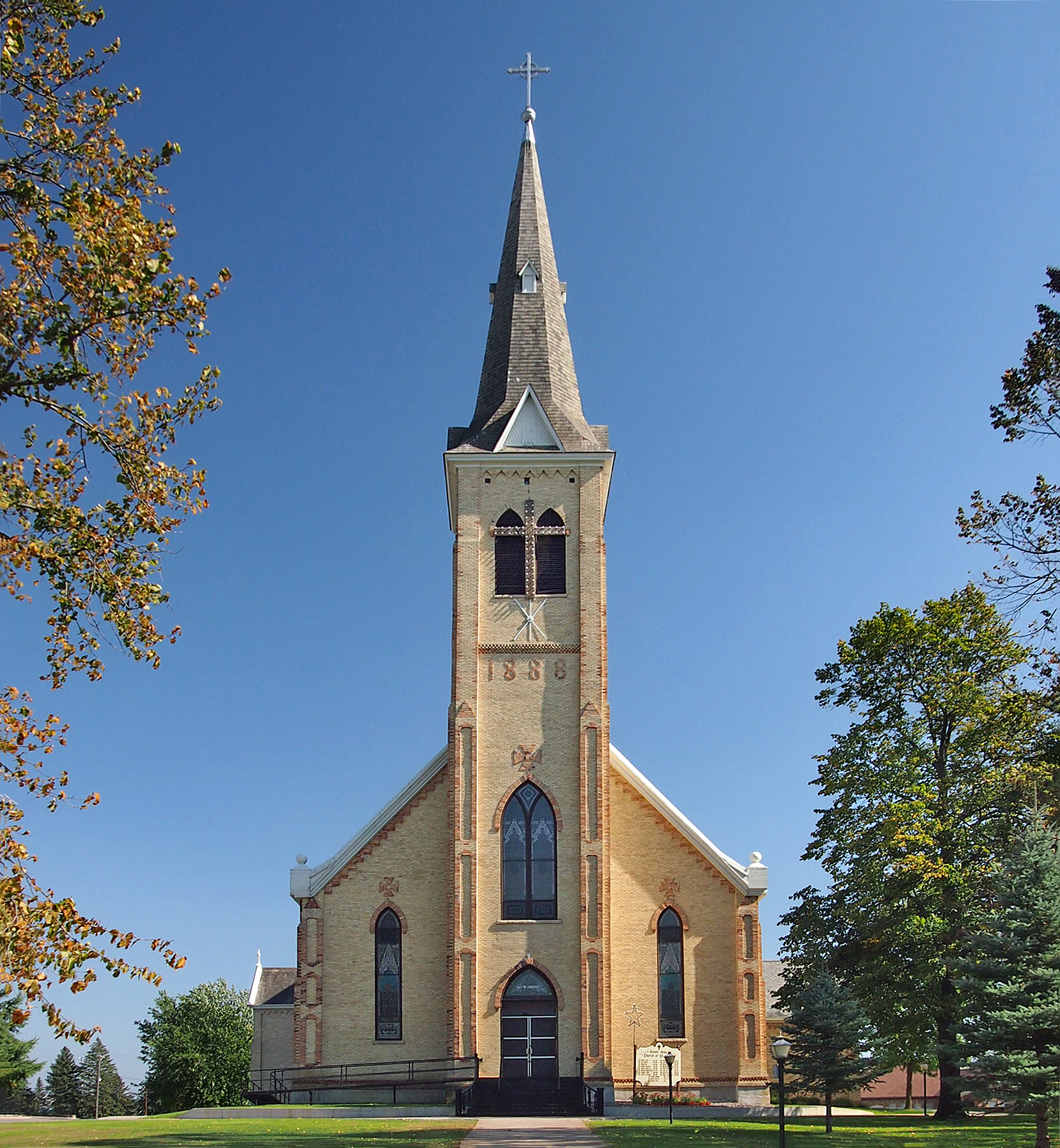
St Joseph's Church viewed from the west, 2013.

Every year Pierz celebrates Oktoberfest during the last weekend in August. There is a medallion search with daily clues; the winner gets $500 in "Pierz Bucks" from local businesses to spend in town. There is also a parade and festival at the city park plus other events, including live Oktoberfest music and games for children.

In the summer, Pierz hosts the Commercial Club's Rock, Roll, & Stroll event. It takes place on Main Street on the first Thursday of June, July, August, and September. During the R.R.S. classic cars roll-in to Pierz to park. These cars are works of art and are admired by many. Car owners, admirers, and pedestrians can find local food stands, business specials, and entertainment throughout town. The Pierz Commercial Club sponsors the event and provides prizes for classic car owners. In 2015, the prizes totaled over $1,000.

Pierz is home to Independent School District 484, where close to 1,200 students are served in grades preK-12. Students are offered a wide variety of outside activities including sports and clubs. The 2017 football season, led by coach Leo Pohlkamp, won the state title.

== Notable people ==
- Joey Browner, Minnesota Vikings (former resident)
- Mary Kiffmeyer, Minnesota Secretary of State (1999–2007)
- John Stumpf, former CEO, Wells Fargo Bank
