= List of county roads in Cook County, Minnesota =

- Standard county road marker

Highway names
- Interstates: Interstate X (I-X)
- US Highways: U.S. Highway X (US X)
- State: Trunk Highway X (MN X or TH X)
- County State-Aid Highways: County State-Aid Highway X (CSAH X)
- County Roads: County Road X (CR X)

System links
- County roads of Minnesota; Cook County

The following is a list of county-maintained roads in Cook County, Minnesota, United States. Some of the routes included in this list are also county-state-aid-highways (CSAH.)

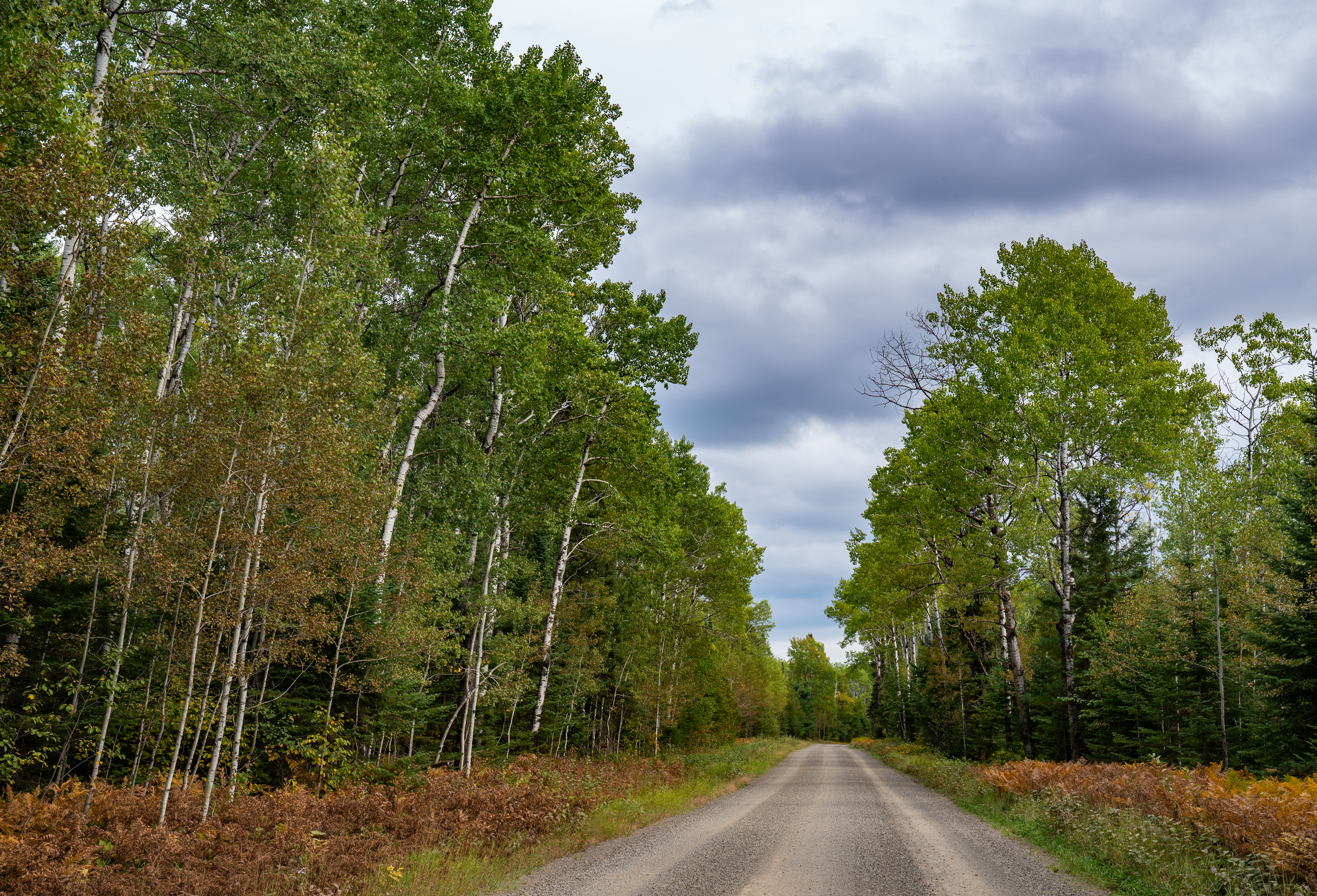
CSAH 16 in Cook County in September, 2018

== Route list ==
Number	Length (mi)	Length (km)	Southern or western terminus	Northern or eastern terminus	Local names	Formed	Removed	Notes
CSAH 1	6.1	9.8	Lake County line (County 8)	MN 61 in Schroeder	Cramer Road	—	—	
CSAH 2	17	27	MN 61 in Tofte	The Grade in Tofte Township	Sawbill Trail	—	—	
CSAH 4	17.3	27.8	MN 61 in Lutsen	The Grade in West Cook	Caribou Trail	—	—	
CSAH 5	1.9	3.1	MN 61 in Lutsen Township	CR 36 in Lutsen Township	Ski Hill Road	—	—	
CSAH 6	4.3	6.9	CSAH 7 in West Cook	CSAH 8 in West Cook		—	—	
CSAH 7	9.5	15.3	MN 61 in West Cook	MN 61 in Grand Marais	5th Street	—	—	
CSAH 8	5.7	9.2	CR 57 in West Cook	CSAH 12 in West Cook	Devil Track Road	—	—	
CSAH 9	0.2	0.32	MN 61 in Grand Marais	CSAH 10 in Grand Marais	Wisconsin Street	—	—	
CSAH 10	0.5	0.80	Dead End in Grand Marais	CSAH 7 in Grand Marais	Broadway Avenue	—	—	
CSAH 12	55.5	89.3	MN 61 in Grand Marais	Dead End in West Cook	Gunflint Trail	—	—	Gunflint Trail National Scenic Byway
CSAH 13	1.1	1.8	MN 61 in West Cook	CSAH 7 in West Cook	Fall River Road	—	—	
CSAH 14	8.7	14.0	MN 61 in East Cook	MN 61 in East Cook		—	—	
CSAH 15	0.7	1.1	MN 61 in Grand Marais	CSAH 12 in Grand Marais	5th Avenue West	—	—	
CSAH 16	16.8	27.0	MN 61 in Hovland	CR 74 in East Cook	Arrowhead Trail	—	—	
CSAH 17	3.8	6.1	MN 61 in Grand Portage Unorganized Territory	Dead End in Grand Portage Unorganized Territory	Old Highway 61; Mineral Center Road; Mile Creek Road; Upper Road	—	—	
CSAH 18	5.7	9.2	Dead End in West Cook	CSAH 8 in West Cook	South Shore Drive	—	—	
CSAH 19	0.4	0.64	MN 61 in Grand Marais	CSAH 7 in Grand Marais	8th Avenue West	—	—	
CSAH 20	2.8	4.5	CSAH 12 in West Cook	CR 50 in West Cook	South Gunflint Lake Road; Mile O Pine	—	—	
CSAH 21	2.6	4.2	CSAH 12 in West Cook	Dead End in West Cook	Hungry Jack Road	—	—	
CSAH 22	5.2	8.4	CSAH 12 in West Cook	Dead End in West Cook	Clearwater Road	—	—	
CSAH 23	0.7	1.1	CSAH 17 in Grand Portage	MN 61 in Grand Portage	Store Road	—	—	
CR 24	0.6	0.97	MN 61 in Tofte	MN 61 in Tofte	Tofte Park Road	—	—	
CR 26	0.3	0.48	Dead End in West Cook	CR 52 in West Cook		—	—	
CR 27	5	8.0	CSAH 8 in West Cook	The Grade in West Cook	Ball Club Road	—	—	
CR 28	0.6	0.97	MN 61 in Lutsen	Dead End in Lusten Township	Alfred Creek Road	—	—	
CR 29	0.3	0.48	MN 61 in Tofte	MN 61 in Tofte	Bayview Drive	—	—	
CR 30	0.5	0.80	Dead End in Schroeder Township	CSAH 1 in Schroeder Township	Dyers Lake Road	—	—	
CR 31	0.5	0.80	CSAH 2 in Tofte Township	Dead End in Tofte Township	Springdale Road	—	—	
CR 33	1.3	2.1	Lake County line (County 7)	CR 49 in Tofte Township	Perent Lake Road	—	—	
CR 34	1.8	2.9	MN 61 in Lutsen Township	Dead End in Lutsen Township		—	—	
CR 35	1	1.6	MN 61 in Lutsen Township	MN 61 in Lutsen Township		—	—	
CR 36	0.4	0.64	CSAH 5 in Lutsen Township	Dead End in Lutsen Township	Ski Hill Road	—	—	
CR 37	0.8	1.3	MN 61 in Lutsen Township	Dead End in Lutsen Township	Mink Ranch Road	—	—	
CR 38	1.5	2.4	CSAH 4 in Lutsen Township	Dead End in Lutsen Township	Peninsula Point Road	—	—	
CR 39	1.5	2.4	CSAH 4 in Lutsen Township	Dead End in Lutsen Township	South Caribou Drive	—	—	
CR 40	0.3	0.48	MN 61 in Lutsen Township	Massie Road in Lutsen Township	Hansen Hjemsted	—	—	
CR 41	0.9	1.4	MN 61 in West Cook	Hall Road in West Cook	Hall Road	—	—	
CR 42	1.2	1.9	CR 45 in West Cook	CR 44 in West Cook	Cardinal Road	—	—	
CR 43	0.6	0.97	Benedict Lane in West Cook	CR 45 in West Cook	Wildwood Lane	—	—	
CR 44	1.5	2.4	CSAH 7 in West Cook	Dead End in West Cook		—	—	
CR 45	6.9	11.1	Dead End in West Cook	CSAH 7 in West Cook	Pike Lake Road	—	—	
CR 46	1.1	1.8	CSAH 12 in West Cook	Dead End in West Cook	North Gunflint Lake Road	—	—	
CR 47	1	1.6	Dead End in West Cook	CSAH 12 in West Cook	Round Lake Road	—	—	
CR 48	0.3	0.48	Bally Creek Road West Cook	CSAH 7 in West Cook		—	—	
CR 49	5.6	9.0	CR 33 in Tofte Township	Dead End in Tofte Township	Sawbill Trail	—	—	
CR 50	1.6	2.6	CSAH 20 in West Cook	Dead End in West Cook	Mile O Pine	—	—	
CR 51	1.3	2.1	CSAH 12 in West Cook	Dead End in West Cook	Loon Lake Road	—	—	
CR 52	0.7	1.1	CSAH 12 in West Cook	CSAH 12 in West Cook	Cutoff Road	—	—	
CR 53	0.2	0.32	CSAH 12 in West Cook	Dead End in West Cook	Pincushion Drive	—	—	
CR 54	0.4	0.64	CSAH 12 in West Cook	Dead End in West Cook	Maple Hill Drive	—	—	
CR 55	2.2	3.5	CSAH 12 in West Cook	Whalstrom Road in West Cook	Golf Course Road; School House Road; Whalstrom Road	—	—	
CR 56	0.8	1.3	Dead End in West Cook	CR 60 in West Cook		—	—	
CR 57	6	9.7	Bally Creek Road in West Cook	CSAH 8 in West Cook	Devil Track Road	—	—	
CR 58	2.6	4.2	MN 61 in West Cook	CR 60 in West Cook	Lindskog Road	—	—	
CR 59	0.7	1.1	MN 61 in East Cook	MN 61 in East Cook	Manitoo Trail	—	—	
CR 60	6.4	10.3	CSAH 12 in West Cook	CSAH 14 in East Cook		—	—	
CR 64	1.8	2.9	Dead End in Grand Marais	CR 52 in West Cook	Old Ski Hill Road	—	—	
CR 67	1.3	2.1	MN 61 in East Cook	Dead End in East Cook	Linnell Road	—	—	
CR 68	3.9	6.3	CSAH 14 in East Cook	Caspers Hill in East Cook	Caspers Hill	—	—	
CR 69	5.5	8.9	MN 61 in East Cook	MN 61 in Hovland	N Road	—	—	
CR 70	11.5	18.5	CR 69 in East Cook	Dead End in East Cook	Camp 20 Road; Hong Hill	—	—	
CR 71	3	4.8	MN 61 in East Cook	Dead End in East Cook	Moose Valley Road	—	—	
CR 73	1.5	2.4	CSAH 17 in Grand Portage	CSAH 17 in Grand Portage Unorganized Territory	Bay Road	—	—	
CR 74	20.4	32.8	CSAH 16 in East Cook	Dead End in East Cook	Arrowhead Trail	—	—	
CR 75	0.7	1.1	Dead End in West Cook	CSAH 6 in West Cook	Sabanja Lane	—	—	
CR 76	1.2	1.9	CR 88 in Hovland	Dead End in Hovland	Stonegate Road	—	—	
CR 77	0.2	0.32	Dead End in Hovland	MN 61 in Hovland	Hammer Road	—	—	
CR 78	0.4	0.64	Dead End in East Cook	MN 61 in East Cook	Trailsyde	—	—	
CR 80	0.3	0.48	Dead End in East Cook	MN 61 in East Cook	Spruce Point	—	—	
CR 82	0.1	0.16	Dead End in East Cook	MN 61 in East Cook		—	—	
CR 83	0.4	0.64	CSAH 12 in West Cook	Dead End in West Cook	Sag Lake Trail	—	—	
CR 83	—	—	MN 61 in Croftville	Dead End in Croftville		—	—	
CR 84	0.2	0.32	Dead End in East Cook	MN 61 in East Cook	Ongstad Road	—	—	
CR 85	2.3	3.7	CSAH 12 in West Cook	CSAH 12 in West Cook	Voyageurs Point Road; Poplar Lake Lane; Austins Landing; Rockwood Road	—	—	
CR 86	—	—	MN 61 in Grand Portage Unorganized Territory	MN 61 in Grand Portage Unorganized Territory		—	—	
CR 87	1.5	2.4	MN 61 in Croftville	MN 61 in Croftville	Croftville Road	—	—	
CR 88	0.6	0.97	MN 61 in Hovland	MN 61 in Hovland	Chicago Bay Road	—	—	
CR 89	12.9	20.8	CSAH 17 in Mineral Center	Dead End in Pigeon River	Old Highway 61	—	—	
CR 91	0.4	0.64	CSAH 12 in West Cook	Dead End in West Cook	Birch Lake Road	—	—	
CR 92	4.6	7.4	CSAH 12 in West Cook	CSAH 12 in West Cook	Old Gunflint Trail	—	—	
CR 94	0.9	1.4	Dead End in Lutsen Township	Dead End in Lutsen Township	White Sky	—	—	
CR 97	4.7	7.6	MN 61 in West Cook	MN 61 in West Cook	Cascade Beach Road	—	—	
CR 101	1.6	2.6	Birch Drive in West Cook	MN 61 in West Cook	Birch Drive	—	—	
CR 102	0.5	0.80	CSAH 6 in West Cook	Dead End in West Cook	Brandon Lane	—	—	
CR 103	0.2	0.32	CR 58 in West Cook	Taylor Lane in West Cook	Taylor Lane	—	—	
