= Devil Track River =

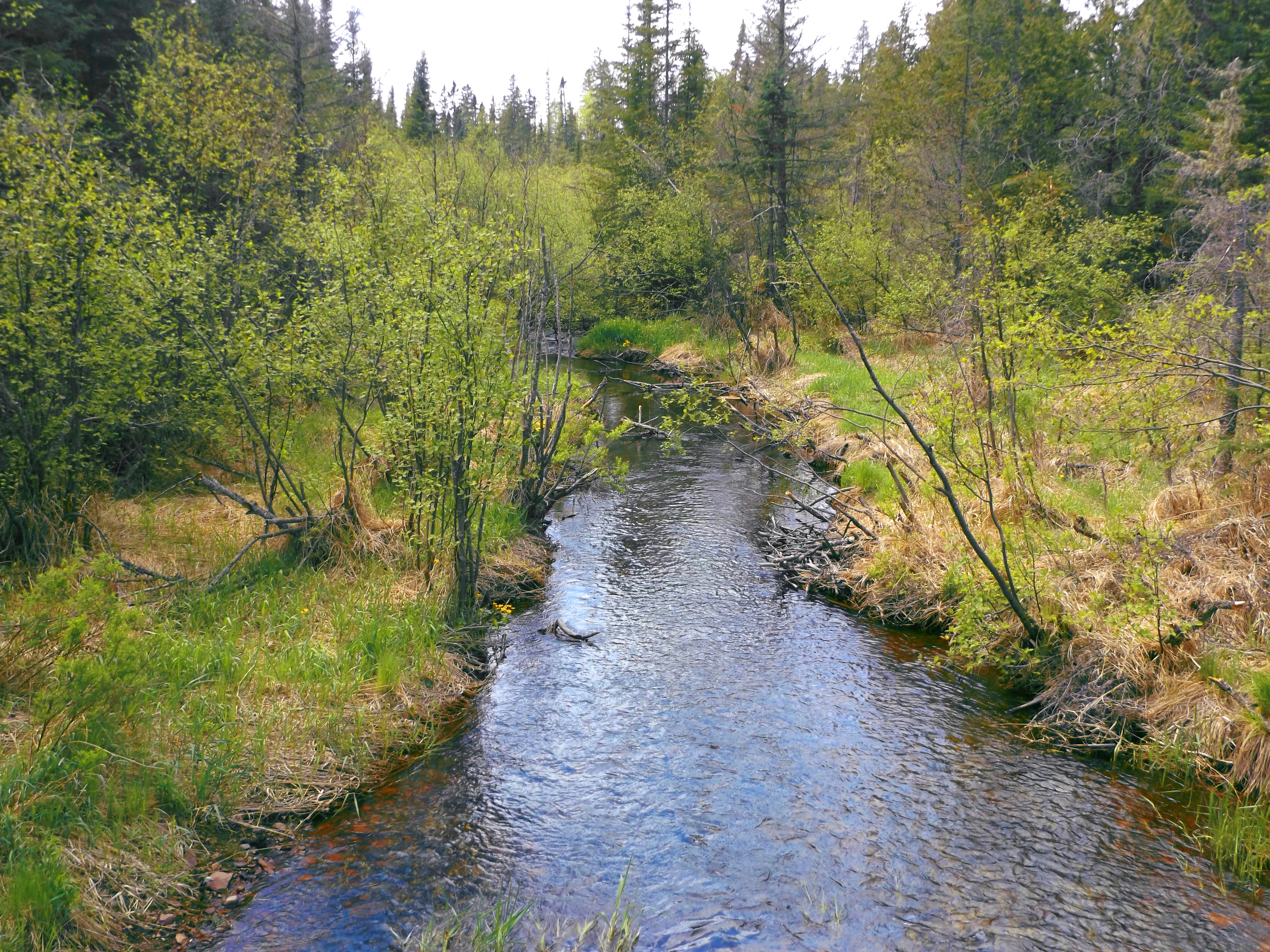
- A stretch of Devil Track River

- Mouth of Devil Track River

Location
- Country: United States
- State: Minnesota
- County: Cook County

Physical characteristics
- Source
  - location: Devil Track Lake
  - coordinates: 47.8186111°N 90.3675°W
- Mouth
  - location: Lake Superior
  - coordinates: 47.7682244°N 90.2612124°W

The Devil Track River is an 8.7-mile-long (14.0 km) river in northeastern Minnesota, the United States. It begins at the outlet of Devil Track Lake and flows southeast to Lake Superior east of Croftville.

Devil Track River is a loose translation of the Ojibwe-language name.

== See also ==
- List of rivers of Minnesota
