= East Cook, Minnesota =

Unorganized territory of Cook County, Minnesota, United States

- Unorganized territory
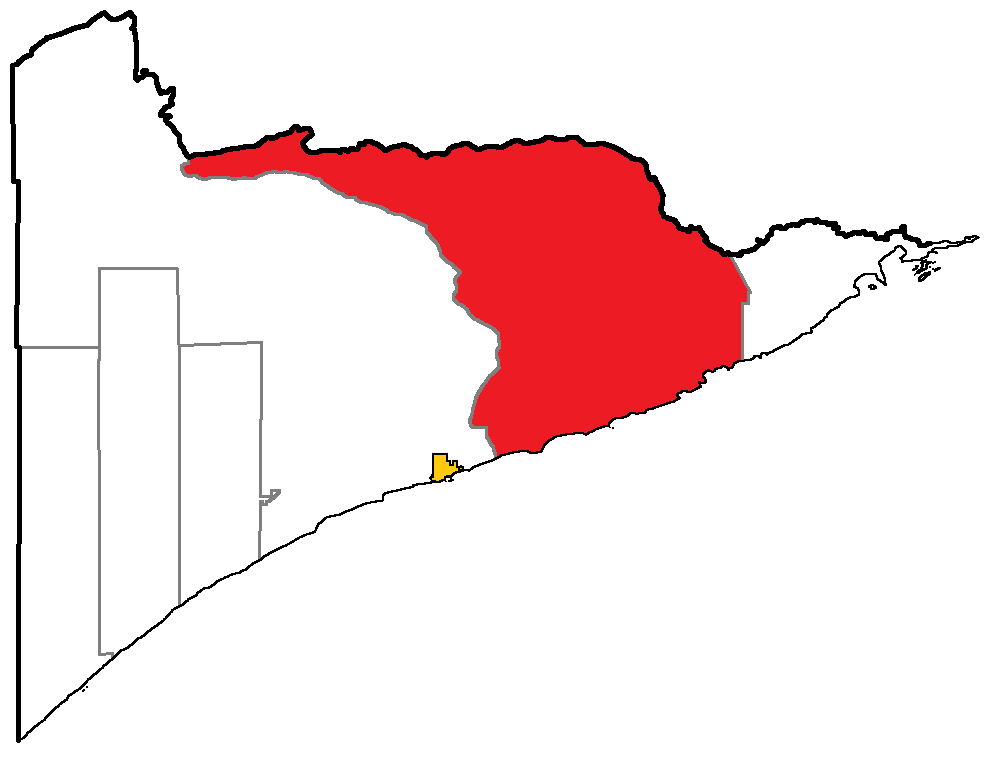
- Location of East Cook in Cook County, Minnesota
- Coordinates: 47°58′20″N 90°10′15″W
- Country: United States
- State: Minnesota
- County: Cook

Area
  - Total: 437.74 sq mi (1,133.7 km^{2})
  - Land: 395.08 sq mi (1,023.3 km^{2})
  - Water: 42.66 sq mi (110.5 km^{2})

Population (2020)
  - Total: 904
  - Density: 2.29/sq mi (0.883/km^{2})
- Time zone: UTC-6 (Central (CST))
  - Summer (DST): UTC-5 (CDT)
- Area code: 218
- GNIS feature ID: 664025

East Cook is an unorganized territory in Cook County, Minnesota, United States. The population was 904 at the 2020 census.

== Geography ==
According to the United States Census Bureau, the unorganized territory has a total area of 438.0 square miles (1,134 km^{2}), of which 395.4 square miles (1,024 km^{2}) is land and 42.6 square miles (110 km^{2}) (9.72%) is water.

=== Unincorporated communities ===
The following unincorporated communities are located within East Cook Unorganized Territory:

- Hovland

=== Streams ===
- Brule River
- Carlson Creek
- Cliff Creek
- Durfee Creek
- Flute Reed River
- Gauthier Creek
- Greenwood River
- Irish Creek
- Kadunce River
- Kimball Creek
- Swamp River
- Swamper Creek
- Woodpile Creek
- Woods Creek

== Demographics ==
As of the census of 2000, there were 814 people, 372 households, and 233 families residing in the unorganized territory. The population density was 2.1 people per square mile (0.81 people/km^{2}). There were 1,128 housing units at an average density of 2.9 per square mile (1.1/km^{2}). The racial makeup of the unorganized territory was 95.70% White, 1.11% Black or African American, 0.86% Native American, 0.61% Asian, 0.74% from other races, and 0.98% from two or more races. Hispanic or Latino of any race were 1.23% of the population.

There were 372 households, out of which 21.5% had children under the age of 18 living with them, 57.5% were married couples living together, 3.2% had a female householder with no husband present, and 37.1% were non-families. 29.6% of all households were made up of individuals, and 8.9% had someone living alone who was 65 years of age or older. The average household size was 2.19 and the average family size was 2.73.

In the unorganized territory the population was spread out, with 19.2% under the age of 18, 4.7% from 18 to 24, 23.6% from 25 to 44, 37.8% from 45 to 64, and 14.7% who were 65 years of age or older. The median age was 46 years. For every 100 females, there were 112.0 males. For every 100 females age 18 and over, there were 109.6 males.

The median income for a household in the unorganized territory was $41,786, and the median income for a family was $49,444. Males had a median income of $31,010 versus $26,827 for females. The per capita income for the unorganized territory was $21,728. About 11.8% of families and 13.7% of the population were below the poverty line, including 16.2% of those under age 18 and 7.4% of those age 65 or over.
