= Colvill, Minnesota =

Ghost town in Minnesota, United States

Colvill
- Ghost town
- Location within Minnesota
- Coordinates: 47°47′43″N 90°09′38″W
- Country: United States
- State: Minnesota
- County: Cook
- Elevation: 692 ft (211 m)
- Time zone: UTC-6 (Central (CST))
  - Summer (DST): UTC-5 (CDT)
- Area code: 218
- GNIS feature ID: 659211

Colvill (also spelled Covill) is an extinct townsite in Cook County, Minnesota, United States.

The community was located between Grand Marais and Grand Portage on Minnesota Highway 61.

Colvill was located 9 miles northeast of Grand Marais, and 25 miles southwest of Grand Portage.

Kadunce River State Wayside area is located near the abandoned townsite of Colvill.

== History ==
Colvill was named after Colonel William J. Colvill, who for a time lived on a homestead in the community.

Colvill Township of Cook County was originated and established in 1906; it was not abandoned during the Great Depression of the 1930s.

Today, the stretch of Highway 61 in Colvill is inhabited with homes and vacation resorts, as well as the Colvill Town Hall and Colvill Fire Department.
