= County State-Aid Highway 12 (Cook County, Minnesota) =

Highway in Minnesota, U.S.

County Road 12
- Gunflint Trail
- CR 12, the Gunflint Trail, highlighted in red

Route information
- Maintained by Cook County Highway Department
- Length: 56.60 mi (91.09 km)

Major junctions
- South end: MN 61 in Grand Marais
- North end: Near Saganaga Lake

Location
- Country: United States
- State: Minnesota
- County: Cook

Highway system
- County roads of Minnesota; Cook County

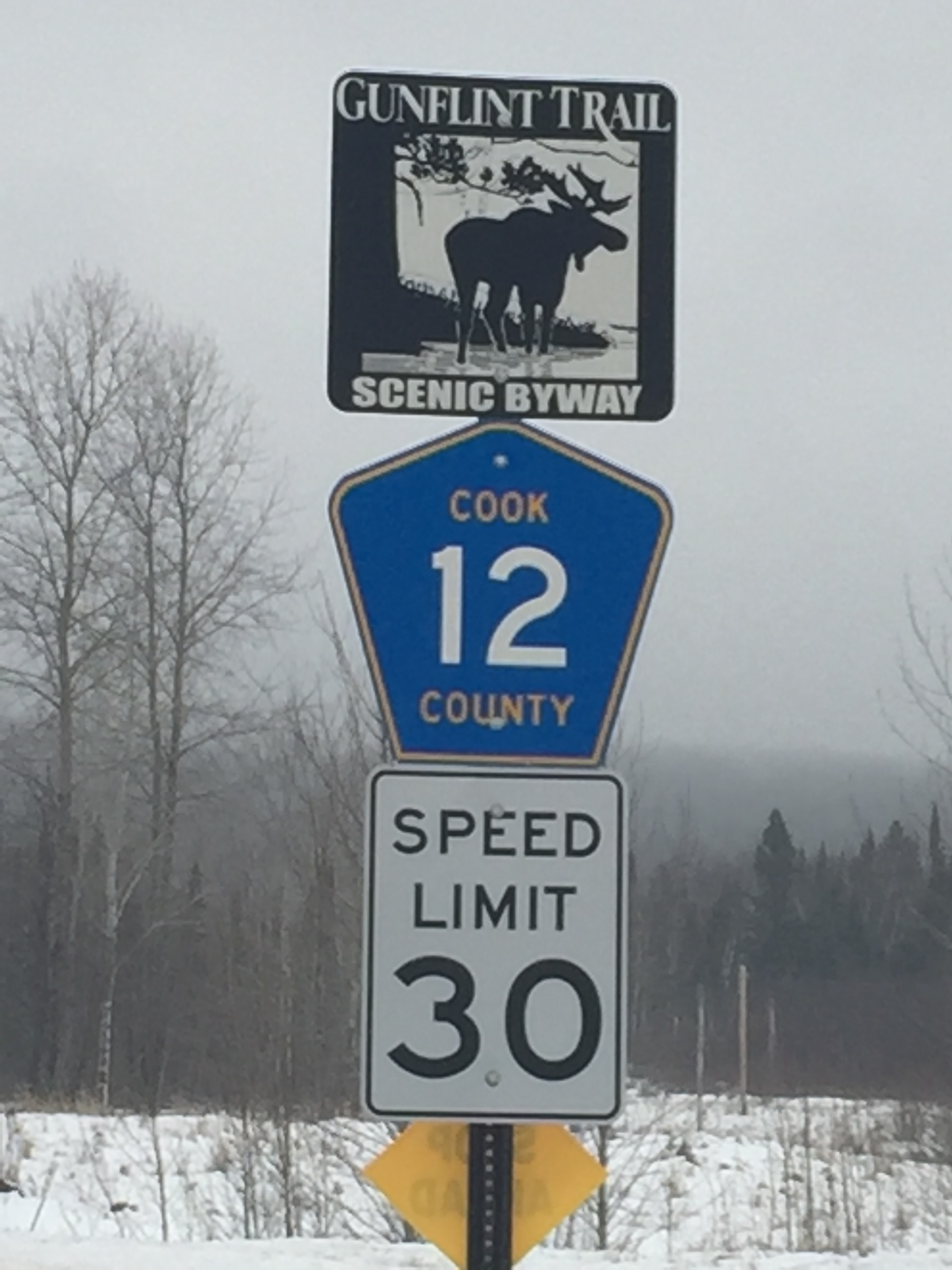
First sign for the Gunflint Trail in Grand Marais

County State-Aid Highway 12 (CSAH 12), also known as the Gunflint Trail, or County Road 12 (CR 12), is a 57-mile (92 km) paved roadway and National Scenic Byway in Cook County, Minnesota, that begins in Grand Marais and ends at Saganaga Lake in the Boundary Waters Canoe Area Wilderness (BWCAW), near the U.S. border with Ontario. It provides access to many of the entry points in the BWCAW.

== Route description ==
Originally a footpath for travelers from inland lakes to Lake Superior, the trail was eventually widened into a roadway, and designated as County Road 12 (CR 12). It now serves as a route to lodges, outfitters, hiking trails and the lakes and rivers of the BWCA. A small number of people, numbering in the hundreds, have full-time residences or businesses along the road, though thousands have cabins or other part-time residential properties.

The route begins at Highway 61 in Grand Marais. It travels generally northward until Northern Light Lake, where it turns northwestward, following the Brule River. It crosses the Brule and continues north-northwest along Swamper Creek, gradually arcing westward and running along the northern shore of Poplar Lake. The road continues west past several lakes including Birch, Mayhew, and Loon before reaching the access roads to Gunflint Lake. The route turns north near Round Lake and travels several miles to Sea Gull Lake, where it turns west again to its terminus at Saganaga Lake.

== History ==
The footpath was improved into a dirt road by Cook County in the 1890s to support the Paulson Mine. In the 1920s, local business owners paid for some improvements to the road; by 1957, it was paved from Grand Marais to Hungry Jack Lake. The last gravel section, south of Sea Gull Lake, was paved in 1979.

The road was designated a National Scenic Byway in 2009.

=== Ham Lake Fire ===
The Ham Lake Fire of spring 2007 severely impacted the Upper Gunflint Trail, burning over 40,000 acres (160 km^{2}) in the Boundary Waters Canoe Area and Ontario's Quetico Provincial Park. The fire lasted several weeks and claimed almost 200 structures, although no one was seriously injured or killed. It was started accidentally by an unattended campfire at a campsite on Ham Lake. The fire drew national attention and a visit from Governor Tim Pawlenty, who inspected the damage first-hand. Despite the significant damage to the forest, most outfitters and commercial businesses have reopened and access to the region's lakes has resumed.

=== The Old Gunflint Trail Post Office ===
Located along a portion of the "Old Gunflint Trail", the post office was originally located in the Voyagers Inn and run by its first postmaster George Stapleton. It was later purchased by Lawrence F. Wooding (Gus) in the early 1950s and came to be known as "Woody's Place".

== Geography and tourism ==
Glaciers created the area's geographical features, forming basins running east to west with the region's bedrock, and when they retreated, lakes formed. The Ojibwa and French explorers found chert, which produces sparks, at Gunflint Lake and gave the trail its name. In contemporary times, both fire and wind put stress on the area.

The Ojibwa built a village that is now Grand Marais, which became a trading post and a center for logging and commercial fishing. The town today is home to artists and artisans, and tourists who visit for the Gunflint Trail's canoe routes, hiking, fishing and 120 miles (193 km) of trails for cross-country skiing.

== Flora and Fauna ==
Grouse, white-tailed deer, American black bear, moose, red fox, snowshoe hare, Great Lakes wolf, lynx and American pine marten inhabit the surrounding forest which comprises spruces, fir, pines, birch and aspen. Lake trout, walleye, northern pike, and bass inhabit the many lakes along the Gunflint Trail.

== Major intersections ==
County	Location	mi	km	Destinations	Notes
Grand Marais	0.00	0.00	MN 61 / LSCT – Duluth, Thunder Bay	Southern terminus	
Grand Marais	0.17	0.27	CR 7 (5th Street)		
Grand Marais	0.95	1.53	CR 15 (5th Avenue)		
West Cook	3.95	6.36	CR 8 (Devil Track Road) / CR 55 (Golf Course Road)		
West Cook	27.63	44.47	CSAH 22 (Clearwater Road)		
West Cook	29.34	47.22	CSAH 21 (Hungry Jack Road)		
West Cook	44.23	71.18	CSAH 20 (South Gunflint Lake Road)		
West Cook	55.93– 56.60	90.01– 91.09	Saganaga Lake	Northern terminus; one-way access loop to lake	
1.000 mi = 1.609 km; 1.000 km = 0.621 mi
