= Pigeon River, Minnesota =

Unincorporated community in Minnesota, United States

Pigeon River
- Unincorporated community
- Location within Minnesota Location within the United States
- Coordinates: 48°00′37″N 89°42′30″W
- Country: United States
- State: Minnesota
- County: Cook
- Elevation: 942 ft (287 m)
- Time zone: UTC-6 (Central (CST))
  - Summer (DST): UTC-5 (CDT)
- Area code: 218
- GNIS feature ID: 1802954

Pigeon River is an unincorporated community in Cook County, Minnesota, United States; located four miles north of the community of Grand Portage.

The community is situated on the banks of the Pigeon River, which serves as part of the Canada–United States border.

Pigeon River is located at the intersection of Cook County Road 89 and Joe's Road. The community is near the tip of Minnesota's Arrowhead Region in the extreme northeast part of the state. Pigeon River is located within the Grand Portage Indian Reservation.

The Grand Portage National Monument is nearby.

== Education ==
All of the county is zoned to Cook County ISD 166.
