= Flute Reed River =

Stream in northeastern Minnesota

Location
- Country: United States
- State: Minnesota
- County: Cook County

Physical characteristics
- Source
  - location: Tom Lake
  - coordinates: 47.9012787°N 90.02065°W
- Mouth
  - location: Hovland
  - coordinates: 47.8387807°N 89.9662078°W
- Length: 10.5 miles (16.9 km)

The Flute Reed River is a 10.5-mile-long (16.9 km) stream in northeastern Minnesota, United States, flowing into Lake Superior at the village of Hovland.

Early in author Calvin Rutstrum's life he lived in a cabin on the Flute Reed river.

== See also ==
- List of rivers of Minnesota
