= Tofte Township, Cook County, Minnesota =

Tofte Township, Minnesota
- Township
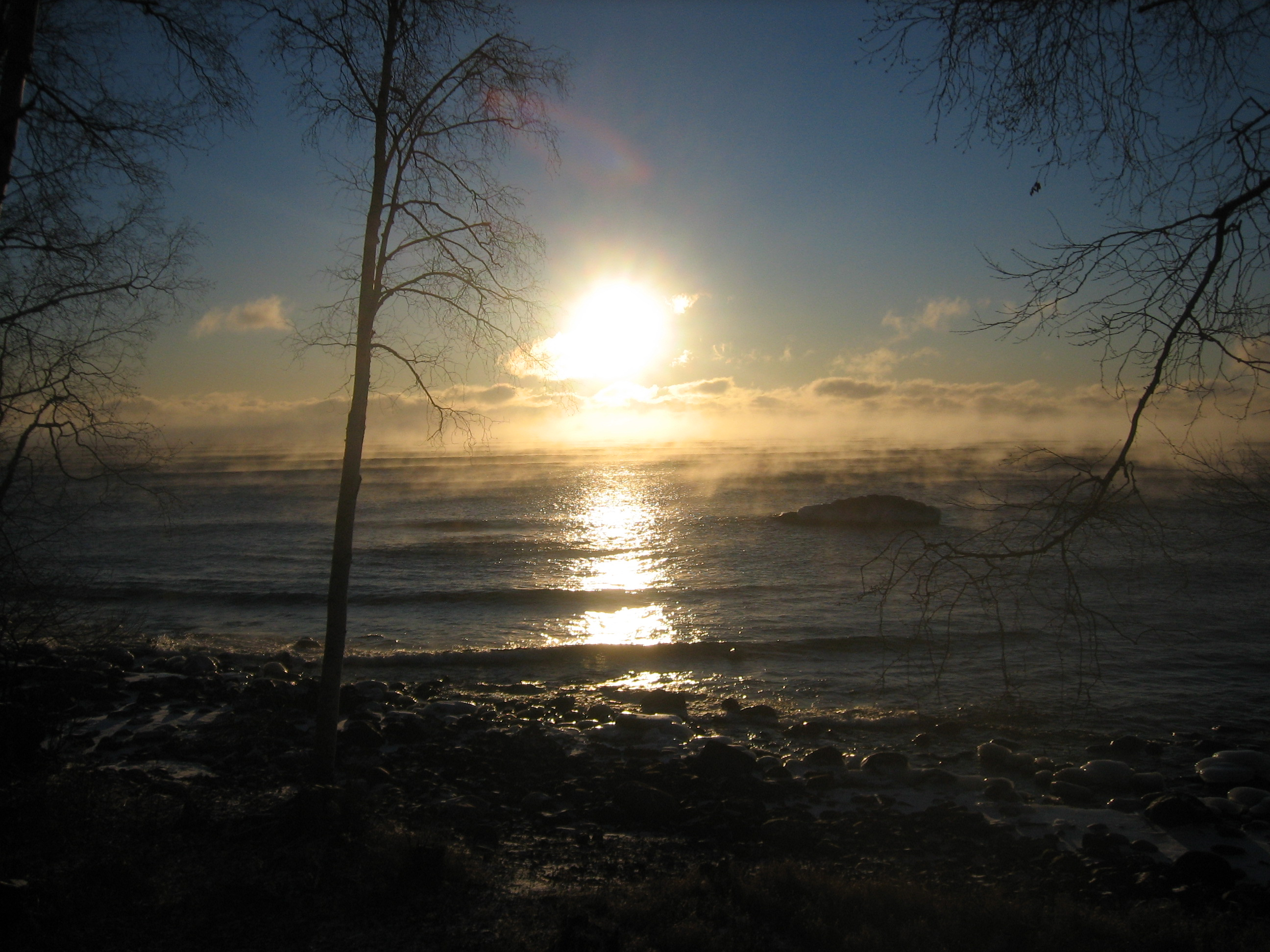
- Sunrise over Lake Superior in Tofte Township

- Logo

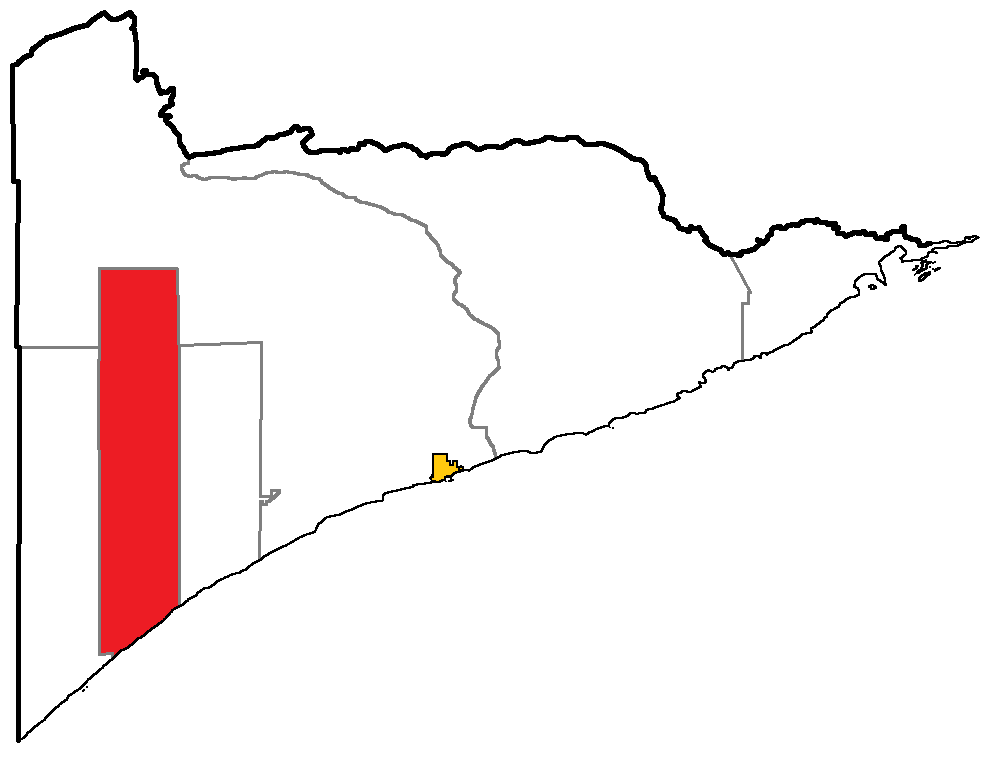
- Location of Tofte Township in Cook County, Minnesota
- Coordinates: 47°45′55″N 90°50′28″W
- Country: United States
- State: Minnesota
- County: Cook

Area
  - Total: 162.5 sq mi (421.0 km^{2})
  - Land: 154.6 sq mi (400.3 km^{2})
  - Water: 8.0 sq mi (20.7 km^{2})
- Elevation: 1,759 ft (536 m)

Population (2020)
  - Total: 269
  - Density: 1.74/sq mi (0.672/km^{2})
- Time zone: UTC-6 (Central (CST))
  - Summer (DST): UTC-5 (CDT)
- ZIP code: 55615
- Area code: 218
- FIPS code: 27-65065
- GNIS feature ID: 0665794
- Website: www.toftemn.com

Tofte Township is one of the three townships of Cook County, Minnesota, United States. The population was 269 at the 2020 census. The unincorporated community of Tofte is located within the township.

== Geography ==
According to the United States Census Bureau, the township has a total area of 162.6 square miles (421.0 km^{2}), of which 154.6 square miles (400.3 km^{2}) is land and 8.0 square miles (20.7 km^{2}) (4.92%) is water.

The township is located on the North Shore of Lake Superior.

Minnesota Highway 61 serves as a main route in the township.

The community of Tofte is located 27 miles southwest of the city of Grand Marais; and 56 miles northeast of the city of Two Harbors.

Temperance River State Park, Ray Berglund State Wayside Park, and the Carlton Peak Lookout are all located within the township. The Superior Hiking Trail and the Gitchi-Gami State Trail both run through the township.

Tofte Township is located within the Superior National Forest.

== Demographics ==
As of the census of 2000, there were 226 people, 102 households, and 65 families residing in the township. The population density was 1.5 people per square mile (0.6/km^{2}). There were 225 housing units at an average density of 1.5/sq mi (0.6/km^{2}). The racial makeup of the township was 98.67% White, 0.88% Native American, 0.44% from other races. Hispanic or Latino of any race were 0.44% of the population.

There were 102 households, out of which 26.5% had children under the age of 18 living with them, 58.8% were married couples living together, 3.9% had a female householder with no husband present, and 35.3% were non-families. 32.4% of all households were made up of individuals, and 6.9% had someone living alone who was 65 years of age or older. The average household size was 2.22 and the average family size was 2.82.

In the township the population was spread out, with 19.0% under the age of 18, 4.0% from 18 to 24, 25.2% from 25 to 44, 36.3% from 45 to 64, and 15.5% who were 65 years of age or older. The median age was 46 years. For every 100 females, there were 121.6 males. For every 100 females age 18 and over, there were 120.5 males.

The median income for a household in the township was $47,188, and the median income for a family was $57,500. Males had a median income of $42,083 versus $35,625 for females. The per capita income for the township was $23,120. None of the families and 1.2% of the population were living below the poverty line.
