= Loon Lake (Cook County, Minnesota) =

Lake in the state of Minnesota, United States

- Location within Minnesota
- Location: Cook County, Minnesota
- Coordinates: 48.076°N 90.689°W
- Type: lake

Loon Lake is a lake in Cook County, Minnesota, off of the Gunflint Trail.

Loon Lake is stocked with lake trout by the Minnesota Department of Natural Resources.
