= Pigeon River Bridge =

Canada–United States border crossing

Grand Portage–Pigeon River Border Crossing
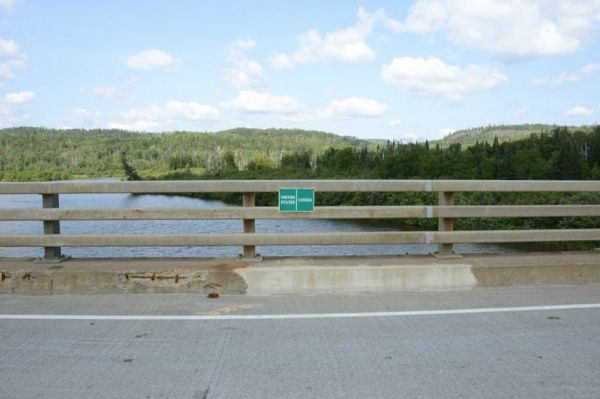
- International Boundary at the Pigeon River Bridge

Location
- Country: United States; Canada
- Location: MN 61 / Highway 61 / Pigeon River Bridge; US Port: 9403 East Highway 61, Grand Portage, MN 55605; Canadian Port: 7690 Highway 61 Neebing ON P7L 0A2
- Coordinates: 48.001435°N 89.585154°W

Details
- Opened: 1964

Website
- https://www.cbp.gov/contact/ports/grand-portage

The Pigeon River Bridge connects the cities of Grand Portage, Minnesota, and Neebing, Ontario. It is the main route between the larger cities of Duluth, Minnesota, and Thunder Bay, Ontario.

== Original crossing ==
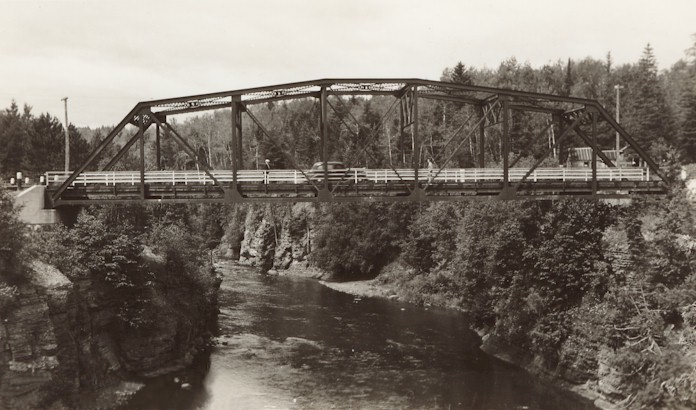
Outlaw Bridge over the Pigeon River carrying Highway 61 (c. 1940)

Prior to 1964, the international border was located 5.5 miles to the west at Outlaw Bridge via the Old Border Road. The route, which was started in 1913, was completed by 1916. It was initially known as the "Scott Highway" after a local lumberman William Scott. but no bridge existed to connect them. The first crossing was constructed from wood in 1916; which was replaced in 1930 by a steel truss bridge, which was paid-for jointly by the American and Canadian governments. The steel bridge was longer and had safer approaches.

Settlements developed at Outlaw bridge near the custom posts on both the Canadian and American sides of the Pigeon River. The Minnesota town was known as Sextus City, named after Wisconsin assemblyman Sextus Lindahl. The Ontario town was called Pigeon River. These small towns contained hotels, gas stations and other businesses catering to travellers crossing the border.

Within weeks of the new International Bridge opening in 1964, the settlements had become ghost towns as the businesses relocated or closed. Ryden's Border Store, which had been located at the old crossing since 1947, moved to Grand Portage when the new bridge was completed. The towns' remains can be still be found at the old crossing.

== Modern bridge ==
Plans to move the crossing from Outlaw Bridge to a more direct route between Duluth and Port Arthur (now Thunder Bay) began as early as 1935 but efforts of the Minnesota government to acquire the necessary land for the roadway from the US government, which held it on behalf of the Chippewa tribe, proved challenging and ended up at the US Supreme Court in 1939. Congress finally approved the condemnation request in 1943 but it took another 20 years before the bridge was prioritized, funded and completed. It would take another four years to complete the roadway leading to it.

The Port of Entry at Grand Portage was established in 1964 when the International Bridge spanning the Pigeon River and connecting highways were completed.

Both the US and Canada border stations are open 24 hours per day. The time zone changes at this crossing: the Canadian side of the border is in the Eastern Time Zone and the American side is in the Central Time Zone.

== See also ==
- List of Canada–United States border crossings
