= John Lyght =

American sheriff

John R. Lyght
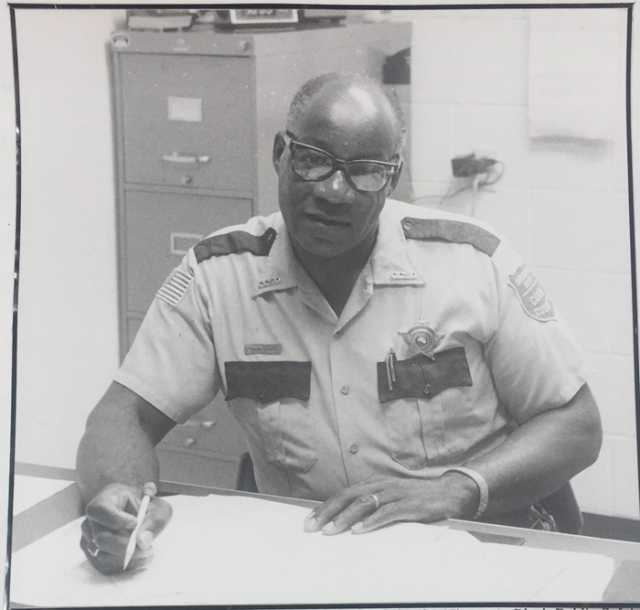

Sheriff of Cook County, Minnesota
- In office 1972–1994

Personal details
- Born: October 1, 1927 Lutsen, Minnesota, U.S.
- Died: January 15, 2010 (aged 82) Grand Marais, Minnesota, U.S.

Military service
- Allegiance: United States
- Branch/service: United States Air Corps
- Years of service: 1944–1945
- Battles/wars: World War II

John R. Lyght (October 1, 1927 – January 15, 2010) was an American businessman, lumberjack, and law enforcement officer. Lyght was the first elected African American sheriff in the state of Minnesota, Lyght served as the sheriff of Cook County, Minnesota in the Arrowhead Region for 22 years from 1972 to 1994.

== Biography ==
Lygth was born on October 1, 1927 in Lutsen, Minnesota to Hosiah Posey Lyght and Stella Jefferson Jones Lyght. Lught's parents originally settled in Lutsen in 1913, they originally lived in West Pennsylvania where they worked as coal miners. Lyght attended local schools before joining the United States Air Corps and serving in World War II from 1944 to 1945. Following his military service Lyght worked for the Foster-Forbes Glass Co. as a resort manager and drove school buses for Cook County Schools. In 1968 Lyght began working as a bouncer for a local club in Lutsen, during this time a conservation officer suggested that Lyght to become a deputy in order to assist the Cook County Sheriff's Office with patrolling.

Beginning in 1968 Lyght was hired as a part-time deputy sheriff for Cook County. Later in 1972 when the sheriff retired, Lyght was offered the role of sheriff by the Cook County commissioners, which Lyght accepted. Despite his imposing height and stature, Lyght's reputation as a fair and friendly person paired with his easygoing attitude allowed him to win multiple elections for sheriff in Cook County, for example, Lyght won 97.4% of the popular vote in 1974. According to Don Davison, the city attorney of Grand Marais, Lyght treated all people based on their behavior and not race, education, or social status. Lyght would serve a total of six terms as sheriff until he was outvoted in 1994.

Lyght died on January 15, 2010 in Grand Marais, Minnesota.
