= Point 2210 =

Mountain in Minnesota, United States

- Location within Minnesota

Highest point
- Elevation: 2,210 ft (670 m)
- Prominence: 380 ft (120 m)
- Coordinates: 47°59′57.12″N 90°13′37.5594″W

Geography
- Location: Cook County, Minnesota, U.S.

Point 2210 is a 2,210-foot (670 m) peak in Cook County, Minnesota, United States, the fifth-highest-ranked peak in the state. It has three closed contours of between 2,200 and 2,219 feet, and survey has not determined which is taller. Two of these summits have less than 20 feet of prominence from each other, but a third has several hundred feet and is located more than two miles to the west (48.004912°N 90.276725°W). There is no summit trail.
