= Grand Portage State Forest =

State Forest in Cook County, Minnesota

- Location within Minnesota
- Interactive map of Grand Portage State Forest

Geography
- Location: Cook County, Minnesota, United States
- Coordinates: 47°56′07″N 89°56′35″W
- Elevation: 1,378 feet (420 m)
- Area: 99,200 acres (40,100 ha)

Administration
- Established: 1933
- Authority: Minnesota DNR, USFS, private
- Website: www.dnr.state.mn.us/state_forests/sft00023/index.html

Ecology
- WWF Classification: Western Great Lakes Forests
- EPA Classification: Northern Lakes and Forests
- Disturbance: Wildfire

Map of the Grand Portage State Forest

The Grand Portage State Forest is a state forest located near the community of Hovland in Cook County, in extreme northeastern Minnesota, United States. The forest encloses Judge C. R. Magney State Park, Swamp River Wildlife Management Area, Hovland Woods Scientific and Natural Area, and Spring Beauty Hardwoods Scientific and Natural Area. It borders the Grand Portage Indian Reservation to the east, the Superior National Forest to the west, and Ontario to the north. The forest is named after the Grand Portage, a historic trade route between the Great Lakes and the Northwest.

== History ==
The area was extensively logged in the early 20th century, and abandoned logging camps can still be found throughout the forest. The Pigeon River Company, the Hughes Brothers Timber Company, and the George W. Mead Company were responsible for the harvest of millions of board feet of White Pine and Northern White Cedar timber, and pulpwood from the black and white spruce found in the forest. Cut pulpwood was usually rafted on Lake Superior to pulp mills in Wisconsin. Wildfires historically played a large part in the formation of the forest's woods. In 1910, a wildfire burned through much of the southeast portion of the forest, and in 1936, 10,000 acres (4,000 ha) of the central part of the forest were burned.

The state forest was established in 1933. By June of that year, passage of the Emergency Conservation Work Act and creation of the Civilian Conservation Corps led to establishment of CCC Camp S-62 in Hovland by Company 722. For the next four years, under the direct of State Forest Service personnel, the company planted trees, fought wildfires, and built roads, fire towers, buildings, and recreational facilities on the forest.

== Recreation ==
Located in the Arrowhead Region of the state, the forest has a number of regional trails. The Border Route Trail follows the Pigeon River, which is the northern limit of the forest and forms the international border between the United States and Canada. This trail connects with the Superior Hiking Trail in the northeastern portion of the forest.

The abundance of lakes in the forest make fishing and water recreation very popular. There are nine boat launches in the forest, including one at McFarland Lake in the northernmost area of the forest, which serves as the easternmost entrance to the Boundary Waters Canoe Area Wilderness. Other outdoor recreational activities include picnicking; 30 miles (48 km) of designated hiking trails, 40 miles (64 km) for snowmobiling, and over 60 miles (97 km) for cross-country skiing. Backcountry camping is offered as an alternative to camping at the three established campgrounds.

== See also ==
- List of Minnesota state forests
- Grand Portage State Park
- Grand Portage National Monument
- Grand Portage Indian Reservation
- Judge C.R. Magney State Park
- Pigeon River (Minnesota–Ontario)
- Superior National Forest
- Boundary Waters Canoe Area Wilderness
