= Durfee Creek =

Stream in Cook County, Minnesota, United States of America

Coordinates: 47°48′2″N 90°15′2″W

Durfee is a stream in Cook County, Minnesota, in the United States.

Durfee Creek was named for George H. Durfee, a county judge.

== See also ==
- List of rivers of Minnesota
