= Mineral Center, Minnesota =

Unincorporated community in Minnesota, United States

Mineral Center
- Unincorporated community
- Location within Minnesota Location within the United States
- Coordinates: 47°56′52″N 89°46′50″W
- Country: United States
- State: Minnesota
- County: Cook
- Elevation: 1,299 ft (396 m)

Population
  - Total: 10
- Time zone: UTC-6 (Central (CST))
  - Summer (DST): UTC-5 (CDT)
- Area code: 218
- GNIS feature ID: 647902

Mineral Center is an unincorporated community in Cook County, Minnesota, United States; located five miles west of the community of Grand Portage.

The community is located at the intersection of Cook County Road 89 and Cook County Road 17 (Mineral Center Road).

Mineral Center is located within the Grand Portage Indian Reservation.

== Education ==
All of the county is zoned to Cook County ISD 166.

Mineral Center had a school house by the name of Birchwood School which was open from 1911-1937.

https://commons.wikimedia.org/wiki/File:Mineral_Center_School,_1921.jpg
