= Chicago Bay =

Bay in Minnesota, U.S.

Chicago Bay is a small bay on the North Shore of Lake Superior, located at 47°50′17″N 89°57′49″W. The community of Hovland, Minnesota, is situated nearby.
