= Tofte, Minnesota =

Unincorporated community in Minnesota, United States

Tofte
- Unincorporated community
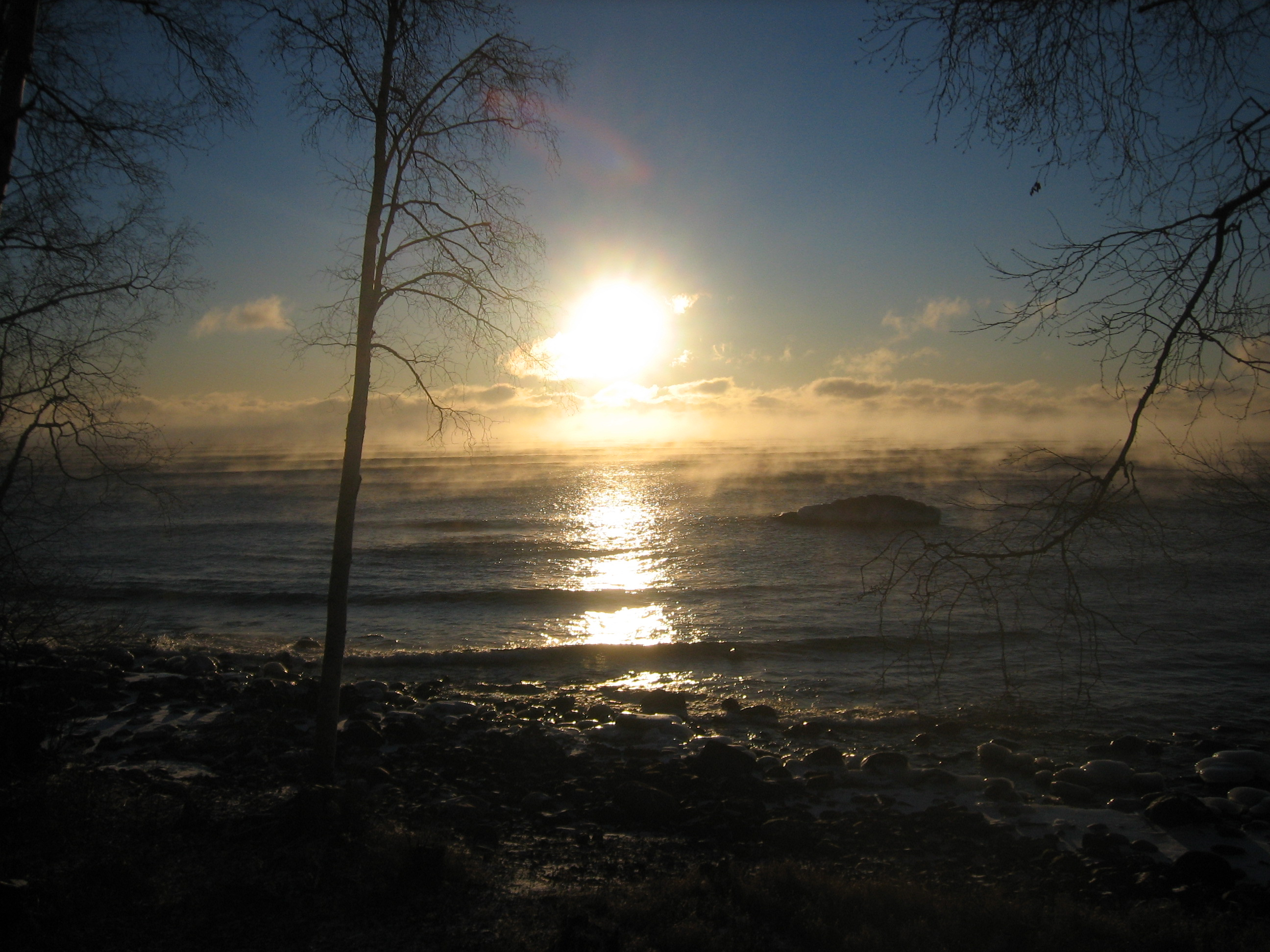
- Sunrise over Lake Superior in Tofte

- Location within Minnesota Location within the United States
- Coordinates: 47°34′26″N 90°50′11″W
- Country: United States
- State: Minnesota
- County: Cook
- Elevation: 627 ft (191 m)
- Time zone: UTC-6 (Central (CST))
  - Summer (DST): UTC-5 (CDT)
- ZIP code: 55615
- Area code: 218
- GNIS feature ID: 658702

Tofte (/ˈtɔːfti/ TAWF-tee) is an unincorporated community in Tofte Township, Cook County, Minnesota, United States.

== Location ==
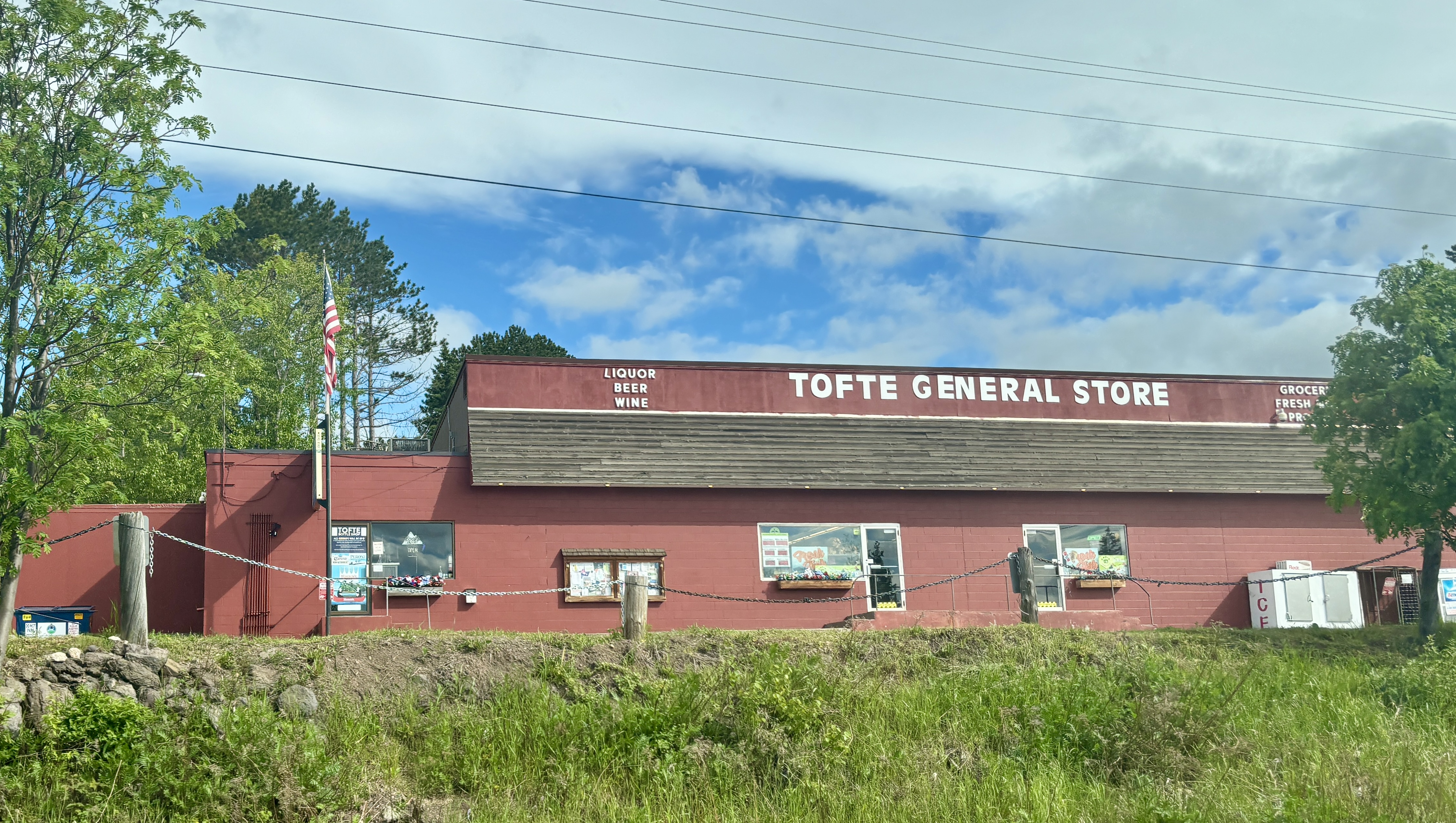
Tofte General Store

Tofte is on the North Shore of Lake Superior, within the Superior National Forest, 27 miles southwest of the city of Grand Marais and 56 miles northeast of the city of Two Harbors. Temperance River State Park, the Gitchi-Gami State Trail, the Superior Hiking Trail, and the Carlton Peak Lookout are all nearby, and the communities of Schroeder and Taconite Harbor are immediately southwest of the town.

Minnesota Highway 61 and Cook County Road 2 (Sawbill Trail) are two of the main routes in the community.

A post office called Tofte has been in operation since 1897.

== History ==
Tofte was founded in 1893 by Norwegian settlers (and twin brothers) Andrew and John Tofte, their sister Torget, and her husband Hans Engelsen. Tofte takes its name from the Norwegian birthplace of its founders. They originally named the town "Carlton" for nearby Carlton Peak, but the name was already used by the town of Carlton, Minnesota. In 1968, Engelsen's nephew Chris Tormondson wrote a booklet titled Tofte: A collection of facts and tales of the North Shore area of Lake Superior as told to Bill Westphal.

Much of the town was destroyed by a forest fire in 1910, but it was rebuilt.

== Attraction ==
In 1996, the North Shore Commercial Fishing Museum opened in Tofte. The museum is Minnesota's first dedicated to commercial fishing, and chronicles the history of the Scandinavian immigrants and communities of the North Shore region of Lake Superior, especially their importance to the national commercial fishing industry of the 1880s to 1940s.

== Education ==
All of the county is zoned to Cook County ISD 166.
