= Lake Abita =

Lake in the state of Minnesota, United States

- Location within Minnesota Location within the United States
- Location: West Cook, Cook County, Minnesota, U.S.
- Coordinates: 47.9231°N 90.4557°W
- Basin countries: United States
- Surface area: 102 acres (0.41 km^{2})
- Max. depth: 14 ft (4.3 m)
- Surface elevation: 2,040.19 ft (622 m)

Abita Lake is a lake in West Cook, Minnesota, which, at an elevation of 2,040.19 feet (621.85 m) above sea level, is Minnesota's ninth highest named lake. Prior to modern surveys, the lake was once believed to be Minnesota's highest elevation lake.

== Name ==
Abita is Ojibwe for "half."

== Topography ==
Lake Abita is situated in the northern region of the Duluth Complex, in the Misquah Hills. The Duluth gabbro of this region forms several ridges running east to west, which are punctuated by outcroppings of so-called "red rock," several of which is the highest points of land in Minnesota. Lake Abita sits on the southern face of one of these, Brule Mountain. Brule Mountain rises 506 feet (154 m) on its northern approach, and the highland to its south, where Lake Abita sits, is only 30 feet (9.1 m) below its summit, which gives the lake the distinction of being Minnesota's highest. It sits about 1,450 feet (440 m) above Lake Superior, which at 602 feet (183 m), is Minnesota's lowest point, and is only about 12 miles (19 km) away from it.

Lake Abita is part of the Brule River watershed. Its water enters the Brule's south branch between Lake Brule and the junction with the north branch. It is located just within the border of the Boundary Waters Canoe Area, which can only be legally entered by water through certain points. The nearest canoe entry point is located on Bower Trout Lake. The south shore can be reached by foot on a trail from Mit Lake Road.

== Ecology ==
Lake Abita is a shallow lake, with a maximum depth of 14 feet (4.3 m). This makes the lake suitable for smaller fish. In a 1990 survey, the overwhelming majority of fish caught in survey nets were white suckers, an average of 58.3 per net. An average of one yellow perch was caught per net, but surveys failed to find any presence of the walleye population which state fisheries had been trying to establish in the lake through three years of fry stocking. The state DNR thus concluded that lake Abita has minimal sport fishing value. Lake Abita's water clarity was measured at seven feet with a secchi disk reading.

== Geology ==
Late 19th century geological surveys of Minnesota found that the rock surrounding Lake Abita was predominately red and grey feldspar, specifically plagioclase, partially changed to diallage, magnetite, and hornblende. This survey found the color changed to brown as one moved south from the lake, due to the presence of Limonite. Eozoon quartz, apatite, and pyrite were also noted in the vicinity of the lake.
