= Mayhew Lake =

Lake in the state of Minnesota, United States

- Location within Minnesota
- Location: Cook County, Minnesota
- Coordinates: 48°4′41″N 90°35′11″W
- Type: lake

Mayhew Lake is a lake in Cook County, Minnesota, in the United States.

Mayhew Lake was named for Henry Mayhew, a state surveyor's assistant.
