= Hovland, Minnesota =

Unincorporated community in Minnesota, United States

Hovland
- Unincorporated community
- Location within Minnesota Location within the United States
- Coordinates: 47°50′20″N 89°58′19″W
- Country: United States
- State: Minnesota
- County: Cook
- Elevation: 610 ft (190 m)

Population
  - Total: 80
- Time zone: UTC-6 (Central (CST))
  - Summer (DST): UTC-5 (CDT)
- ZIP code: 55606
- Area code: 218
- GNIS feature ID: 656669

Hovland is an unincorporated community in Cook County, Minnesota, United States.

The community is located on Chicago Bay of the North Shore of Lake Superior. Hovland is located 18 miles northeast of the city of Grand Marais; and 16 miles southwest of Grand Portage.

Minnesota Highway 61 and Cook County Road 16 (Arrowhead Trail) are two of the main routes in the community.

Hovland is located within the Grand Portage State Forest; and was (until 2004) the location of a Minnesota Forest Service Ranger Station.

Judge C. R. Magney State Park and the Naniboujou Club Lodge are both located near Hovland.

== History ==
Hovland was settled during the late 1880s by fishermen of primarily Scandinavian ancestry. Hovland post office was established in 1889, named after settler Ole Brunes' place of origin in Norway. The Trefoldighets Evangelisk Norsk Lutherske menighet, a Hauge Synod Lutheran congregation, was organized in 1909. The congregation continues as Trinity Lutheran and is noted for the distinctive architecture of its stone church, begun in 1947.

Of similar origin is also the name of Hoffland, Nebraska.

== Education ==
All of the county is zoned to Cook County ISD 166.

== Bibliography ==
- Rand McNally Road Atlas (2007 year ed.). "see Minnesota entry"
- Official State of Minnesota Highway Map (2011-2012 ed.).
