= Pigeon River (Minnesota–Ontario) =

- Pigeon River High Falls in Grand Portage State Park, Minnesota

- Mouth of the Pigeon River
- Native name: Rivière aux Tourtres (French)

Location
- Country: Canada and United States
- Region: Minnesota and Ontario
- County: Cook

Physical characteristics
- Source
  - location: South Fowl Lake
  - coordinates: 48.0396086°N 89.9964786°W
  - elevation: 1,437 feet (438 m)
- Mouth
  - location: Pigeon Point, Lake Superior
  - coordinates: 47.9991667°N 89.5694444°W
  - elevation: 600 feet (180 m)
- Length: 31.2 miles (50.2 km)

The Pigeon River forms part of the Canada–United States border between the state of Minnesota and the province of Ontario, west of Lake Superior. In pre-industrial times, the river was a waterway of great importance for transportation and the fur trade.

== Geography ==
The Pigeon River flows in an easterly direction out of the Boundary Waters Canoe Area Wilderness for 31.2 miles (50.2 km) until it drains into Lake Superior. The Pigeon is one of the larger rivers on Superior's North Shore.

=== Headwaters ===
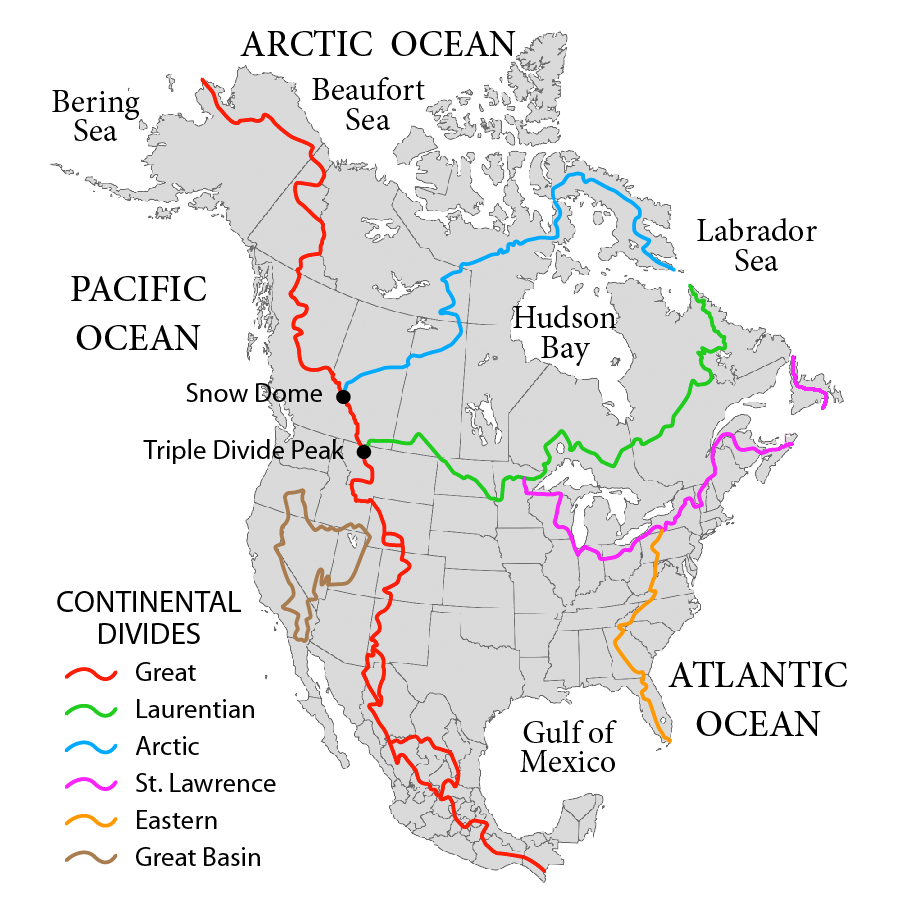
Continental divides in North America. The Laurentian Divide is in green.

The Pigeon River originates from a chain of lakes along the US-Canada border, the highest of which, and furthest west, is Mountain Lake. Among the Pigeon's tributaries is the Arrow River of Ontario, which rises in South Lake, west of and at a lower elevation than Mountain Lake. South Lake is separated only by a narrow isthmus from North Lake in the Rainy River watershed. This isthmus is a part of the Northern (or Laurentian) Continental divide, and is crossed by the Height of Land Portage. The fur-trading Voyageurs and coureurs des bois crossed this divide and travelled north and west downstream on the Rainy River and Winnipeg River to Lake Winnipeg, and thence to fur-producing areas of the Canadian northwest.

=== Lower course ===
Below South Fowl Lake, the Pigeon River alternates between navigable waters and cascades or waterfalls. As the river nears Lake Superior, the gradient increases, culminating in a spectacular gorge including two notable waterfalls: High Falls, at 120 feet (37 m) the highest waterfall in Minnesota, and Middle Falls. This gorge is included within both Grand Portage State Park in Cook County, Minnesota, and Pigeon River Provincial Park (9.49 km^{2}) across the border in Thunder Bay District, Ontario. Its lower course also forms the northern boundary of the Grand Portage Indian Reservation.

A 9-mile (14 km) portage, known as Grand Portage and used for hundreds of years by canoe travelers, bypasses these lower waterfalls and reaches Lake Superior a few miles from the mouth of the river. This historic area is protected as a part of the Grand Portage National Monument.

== History ==
Up to the 19th century, the river was a primary water route for fur traders, and even earlier, for Native Americans, leading to the Lake of the Woods and thence to western Canada and Hudson Bay. The Montreal-based North West Company had a post at the community of Grand Portage on the shore of Lake Superior until 1801 when difficulties with the U.S. government following the adoption of the Jay Treaty obliged it to relocate to the Kaministiquia River in British territory.

The region was extensively logged for white and red pine in the early part of the 20th century. An "outlaw" bridge across the river was built by residents of Thunder Bay, Ontario, and opened on August 18, 1917, to permit access to Minnesota. The Canadian road leading to the customs and immigration facilities at the bridge was initially known as the "Scott Highway" after lumberman William Scott, and was designated as King's Highway 61 in 1937. Later the Pigeon River Bridge was built downstream and the "outlaw bridge" was removed.

The river's English name is a translation of the 18th century French name Rivière aux Tourtres or Tourtes derived after the passenger pigeon which was once prolific in this region.

== See also ==
- List of rivers of Ontario
- List of rivers of Minnesota
- List of longest streams of Minnesota
