= Croftville, Minnesota =

Unincorporated community in Minnesota, United States

- Unincorporated community
- Location within Minnesota Location within the United States
- Coordinates: 47°45′54″N 90°16′32″W
- Country: United States
- State: Minnesota
- County: Cook
- Elevation: 627 ft (191 m)
- Time zone: UTC-6 (Central (CST))
  - Summer (DST): UTC-5 (CDT)
- Area code: 218
- GNIS feature ID: 655875

Croftville is an unincorporated community in Cook County, Minnesota, United States.

The community is located three miles northeast of the city of Grand Marais on Minnesota Highway 61.

Highway 61 and County Road 87 (Croftville Road) are two of the main routes in the community.

== History ==
Croftville, which thrived in the early 1900s, was first settled by Peter Olsen and brothers Charles and Joe Croft, from whom the community got its name.

== Education ==
All of the county is zoned to Cook County ISD 166.
