= Minnesota State Highway 61 =

Highway in Minnesota

Trunk Highway 61
- MN 61 highlighted in red

Route information
- Maintained by MnDOT
- Length: 150.321 mi (241.918 km)
- Existed: 1991–present
- Tourist routes: Lake Superior Circle Tour; North Shore Scenic Drive

Major junctions
- South end: I-35 at Duluth
- MN 1 at Illgen City
- North end: Highway 61 at Grand Portage–Pigeon River Border Crossing

Location
- Country: United States
- State: Minnesota
- Counties: St. Louis, Lake, Cook

Highway system
- Minnesota Trunk Highway System; Interstate; US; State; Legislative; Scenic
← US 61	→ MN 62

Minnesota State Highway 61 (MN 61) is a 150.321-mile-long (241.918 km) highway in northeast Minnesota, which runs from a junction with Interstate 35 (I-35) in Duluth at 26th Avenue East, and continues northeast to its northern terminus at the Canadian border near Grand Portage, connecting to Ontario Highway 61 at the Pigeon River Bridge. The route is a scenic highway, following the North Shore of Lake Superior, and is part of the Lake Superior Circle Tour designation that runs through Minnesota, Ontario, Michigan, and Wisconsin.

This roadway was designated U.S. Highway 61 (US 61) until 1991. US 61 ran from the Canadian border to New Orleans, and is the road to which musician and Duluth native Bob Dylan referred in the album and song Highway 61 Revisited.

The North Shore Scenic Drive is an All-American Road scenic byway that follows Saint Louis County Road 61 / Lake County Road 61 / MN 61, formerly US 61, from the city of Duluth, Minnesota, to the Canadian border near Grand Portage. The route stays close to the rocky North Shore, offering spectacular vistas of the lake to the southeast as it skirts along the foothills of the Sawtooth Range to the northwest.

== Route description ==
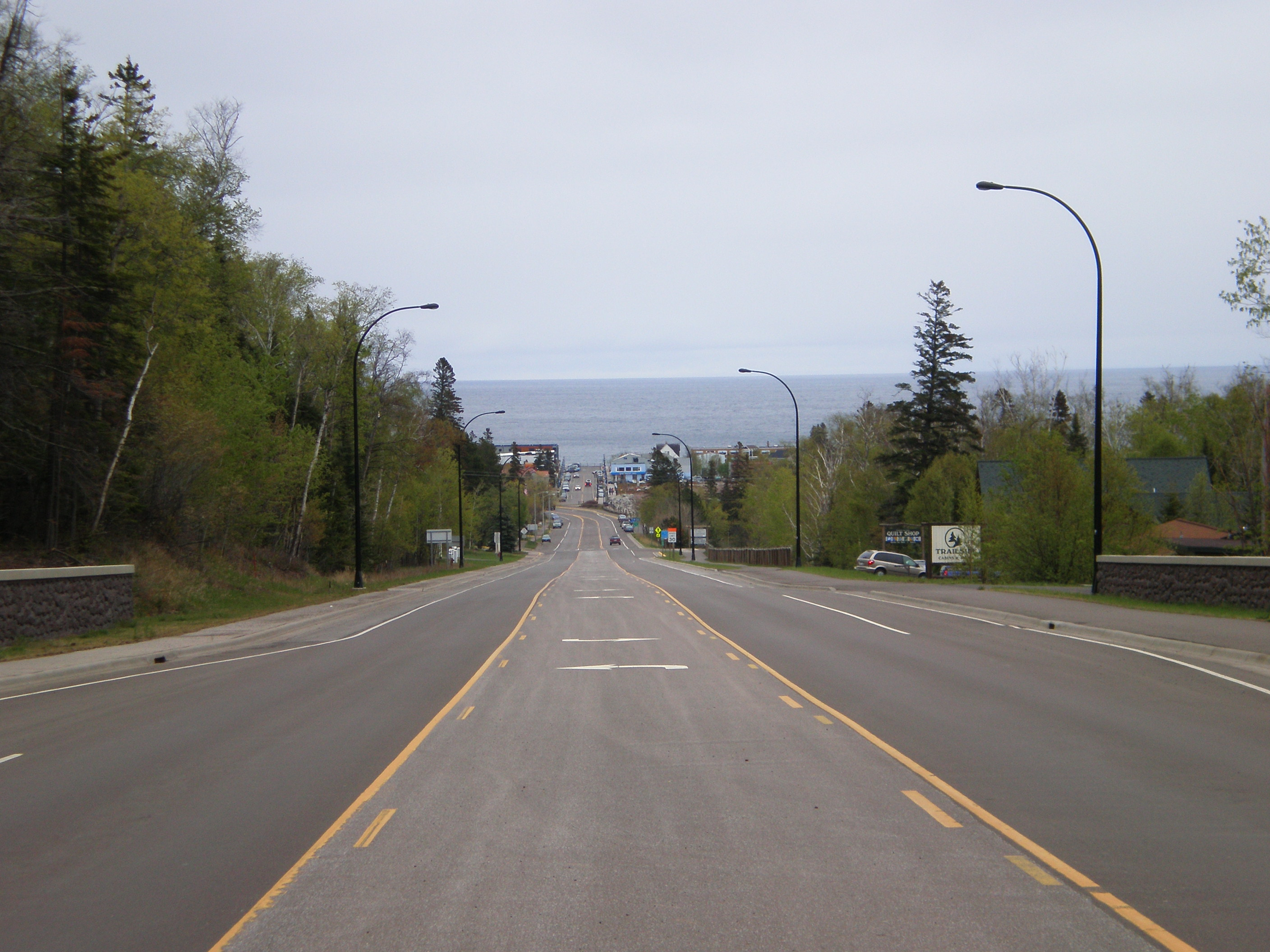
Highway 61 entering Grand Marais from the south

MN 61 serves as a northeast–southwest route in northeast Minnesota between Duluth, Two Harbors, Silver Bay, Grand Marais, and the Canadian border.

21 miles (34 km) of MN 61 from Duluth to Two Harbors is a four-lane expressway officially designated the Arthur Rohweder Memorial Highway. There are no markers on the highway showing this designation, but there is a plaque at a wayside.

The roadway is located close to and in many places next to Lake Superior. Sights include forests, wildlife, cliffs, state parks, and a national monument.

Highway 61 passes through the Superior National Forest and the Grand Portage State Forest in Cook County.

The following state parks are located on Highway 61:

- Gooseberry Falls State Park is located 13 miles (21 km) northeast of Two Harbors in Lake County.
- Split Rock Lighthouse State Park is located in Lake County between Two Harbors and Silver Bay.
- Tettegouche State Park is located in Lake County at the base of the Baptism River. The park is located immediately northeast of Silver Bay.
- Temperance River State Park is located immediately northeast of Schroeder in Cook County.
- Cascade River State Park is located in Cook County between Lutsen and Grand Marais.
- Judge C. R. Magney State Park is located on the banks of the Brule River. The park is located 14 miles (23 km) northeast of Grand Marais in Cook County.
- Grand Portage State Park is located in Cook County on the banks of the Pigeon River. The community of Grand Portage is nearby.

MN 61 starts on the northern end of Duluth and continues northeasterly towards Two Harbors, the first city outside Duluth and the largest city between Duluth and Grand Portage. MN 61 continues as a four-lane expressway through Two Harbors, then becomes two lanes. After Two Harbors, there are no towns for almost 30 miles (48 km), until reaching Beaver Bay, followed by Silver Bay. Afterwards, MN 61 passes a few state parks before reaching Schroeder, followed by Tofte. After Tofte, the road to Lutsen Mountains ski resort, County Road 5, meets with MN 61. The next town is Lutsen, followed by Cascade River State Park. About 18 miles (29 km) further along is Grand Marais, the second largest city after Two Harbors, and another 34 miles (55 km) along is Grand Portage; between the two is Hovland. MN 61 bypasses Grand Portage to the west. The northern terminus for MN 61 is at the Canadian border, where it becomes Ontario Highway 61 upon entering Canada at the Pigeon River Bridge; the roadway continues to Thunder Bay.

== History ==
U.S. Highway 61
- Location: Wyoming, MN—Canadian border
- Existed: 1926–1991

Minnesota Highway 61 was designated and signed in 1991. The roadway was originally part of US 61 from 1926 to 1991.

After construction of I-35 in the 1960s, US 61 was co-signed with I-35 until 1991. During that year, US 61 was decommissioned from the Canadian border south to its present-day junction with I-35 at the city of Wyoming near Forest Lake. The section of US 61 north of Duluth was redesignated MN 61 that same year.

MN 61 is one of three state marked highways to carry the same number as an existing U.S. Highway within the state; the others are MN 65 and MN 169.

From 1991 to 1997, MN 61 continued southwest on London Road beyond I-35 to 14th Avenue East, where southbound traffic then turned northwest to end at MN 23 which followed a one-way pair of 2nd Street East (eastbound) and 3rd Street East (westbound); northbound MN 61 began following 12th Avenue East south to London Road. Both routes were turned back to end at their respective I-35 junctions in Duluth in 1997.

=== Early history ===
MN 61, between Duluth and the Canadian border, was commissioned as part of US 61 in 1926, ready for use by 1929, and paved by 1940.

The section of MN 61 from Hovland to the Pigeon River formerly ran inland, bypassing the community of Grand Portage. The new highway alignment and border crossing were constructed in the early 1960s.

The MN 61 expressway between Duluth and Two Harbors was constructed inland in the 1960s. The state then turned over maintenance of the original US 61 between Duluth and Two Harbors to Saint Louis and Lake counties. The two counties then redesignated this section as CR 61 or Scenic 61.

== Major intersections ==
County	Location	mi	km	Destinations	Notes
St. Louis	Duluth	1.471	2.367	I-35 south / LSCT / London Road / 26th Avenue	Southern terminus; I-35 exit 259; northern terminus of I-35; southern end of LSCT concurrency; road continues as London Rd. (former US 61 south)
St. Louis	Duluth	5.425	8.731	North Shore Scenic Drive (Scenic 61) / LSCT Spur to CSAH 61	
Lake	Two Harbors	24.668	39.699	North Shore Scenic Drive (CSAH 61) / LSCT Spur	
Lake	Silver Bay			CSAH 5 / FFH 11 (Superior National Forest Scenic Byway)	
Lake	Illgen City	59.308	95.447	MN 1 west – Ely	Eastern terminus of MN 1
Lake	Little Marais	65.271	105.043	Little Marais Road (CSAH 6)	
Cook	Tofte	82.682	133.064	Sawbill Trail (CSAH 2)	
Cook	Lutsen	92.528	148.909	Caribou Trail (CSAH 4)	
Cook	Grand Marais	110.256	177.440	Gunflint Trail (CSAH 12)	
Cook	Hovland	128.867	207.391	Arrowhead Trail (CSAH 16)	
Pigeon River		150.870	242.802	Grand Portage–Pigeon River Border Crossing	
Pigeon River		150.870	242.802	Highway 61 north / LSCT – Thunder Bay	Continuation into Canada; northern end of LSCT concurrency
1.000 mi = 1.609 km; 1.000 km = 0.621 mi: Concurrency terminus

== See also ==
- Saint Louis County Road 61: Scenic 61
- Lake County Road 61: Scenic 61
