= Lutsen, Minnesota =

Unincorporated community in Minnesota, US

- Census-designated place (CDP) and Unincorporated community
- Location within Minnesota
- Coordinates: 47°38′50″N 90°40′29″W
- Country: United States
- State: Minnesota
- County: Cook
- Township: Lutsen

Area
  - Total: 11.08 sq mi (28.69 km^{2})
  - Land: 10.96 sq mi (28.39 km^{2})
  - Water: 0.12 sq mi (0.30 km^{2})
- Elevation: 669 ft (204 m)

Population (2020)
  - Total: 220
  - Density: 20.8/sq mi (8.03/km^{2})
- Time zone: UTC-6 (CST)
  - Summer (DST): UTC-5 (CDT)
- ZIP codes: 55604, 55612
- Area code: 218
- GNIS feature ID: 657265

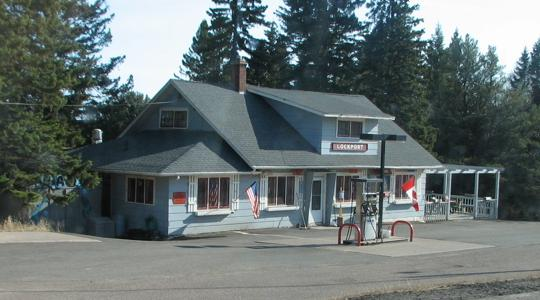
Lockport Marketplace at Lutsen

Lutsen (/ˈluːtsən/ LOOT-sən) is an unincorporated community and census-designated place (CDP) in Lutsen Township, Cook County, Minnesota, United States. As of the 2020 census, its population was 220.

Lutsen is located within the Superior National Forest, on the North Shore of Lake Superior. It is 18 miles southwest of the city of Grand Marais; and 65 miles northeast of the city of Two Harbors. Cascade River State Park and the Superior Hiking Trail are both nearby.

Minnesota Highway 61, formerly part of U.S. Route 61, is the main arterial route in the community. It runs along Lake Superior between Duluth and Grand Portage to the Canadian border.

== Economy ==
Lutsen Mountains Ski Resort is the main economic feature of the community. The community is also home to several resorts.

== Climate ==
Climate data for Lutsen, Minnesota, 1991–2020 normals: 1300ft (396m)
Month	Jan	Feb	Mar	Apr	May	Jun	Jul	Aug	Sep	Oct	Nov	Dec	Year
Mean daily maximum °F (°C)	17.0 (−8.3)	21.2 (−6.0)	32.6 (0.3)	44.3 (6.8)	58.4 (14.7)	66.3 (19.1)	72.9 (22.7)	70.8 (21.6)	62.3 (16.8)	49.0 (9.4)	34.4 (1.3)	22.3 (−5.4)	46.0 (7.8)
Daily mean °F (°C)	6.9 (−13.9)	10.3 (−12.1)	21.8 (−5.7)	34.4 (1.3)	48.2 (9.0)	57.4 (14.1)	63.5 (17.5)	61.6 (16.4)	53.4 (11.9)	40.8 (4.9)	27.1 (−2.7)	14.8 (−9.6)	36.7 (2.6)
Mean daily minimum °F (°C)	−3.2 (−19.6)	−0.6 (−18.1)	11.0 (−11.7)	24.4 (−4.2)	38.1 (3.4)	48.5 (9.2)	54.1 (12.3)	52.3 (11.3)	44.4 (6.9)	32.6 (0.3)	19.9 (−6.7)	7.4 (−13.7)	27.4 (−2.6)
Average precipitation inches (mm)	1.39 (35)	0.87 (22)	1.55 (39)	3.06 (78)	3.27 (83)	3.77 (96)	3.61 (92)	3.77 (96)	3.89 (99)	3.88 (99)	2.62 (67)	1.89 (48)	33.57 (854)
Average snowfall inches (cm)	27.1 (69)	13.7 (35)	9.2 (23)	3.8 (9.7)	0.4 (1.0)	0.0 (0.0)	0.0 (0.0)	0.0 (0.0)	trace	1.8 (4.6)	14.2 (36)	17.4 (44)	87.6 (222.3)
Source 1: NOAA (1981-2010 precipitation)
Source 2: XMACIS (1991-2005 snowfall)

== Demographics ==
Historical population
Census	Pop.	Note	%±
2010	190		—
2020	220		15.8%
U.S. Decennial Census; 2020 Census

== Education ==
All of the county is zoned to Cook County ISD 166.
