= West Cook, Minnesota =

Unorganized territory of Cook County, Minnesota, United States

- Unorganized territory
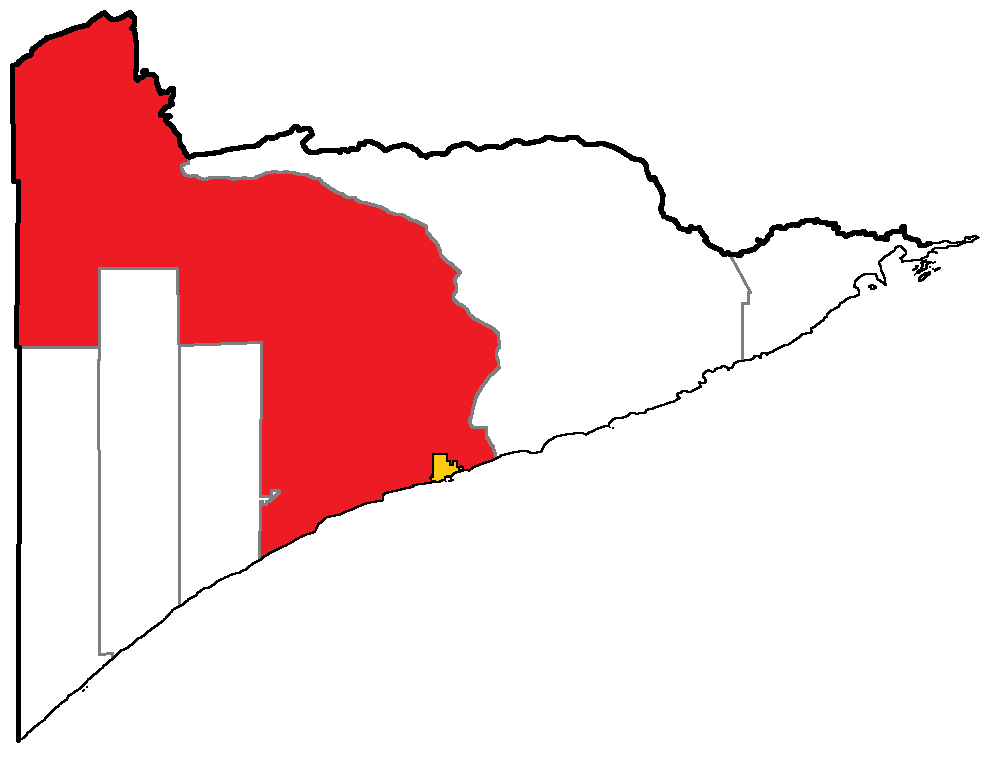
- Location of West Cook in Cook County, Minnesota
- Coordinates: 47°58′08″N 90°38′46″W
- Country: United States
- State: Minnesota
- County: Cook

Area
  - Total: 663.1 sq mi (1,717 km^{2})
  - Land: 575.9 sq mi (1,492 km^{2})
  - Water: 87.2 sq mi (226 km^{2})

Population (2020)
  - Total: 1,756
  - Density: 3.049/sq mi (1.177/km^{2})
- Time zone: UTC–6 (CST)
  - Summer (DST): UTC–5 (CDT)
- ZIP Code: 55604, 55612
- Area code: 218

West Cook is an unorganized territory in Cook County, Minnesota, United States. The population is 1,848 in 2024.

== Geography ==
According to the United States Census Bureau, the unorganized territory has a total area of 663.1 square miles (1,717.4 km^{2}), of which 575.9 square miles (1,491.7 km^{2}) is land and 87.2 square miles (225.8 km^{2}) (13.15%) is water.

=== Unincorporated communities ===
The following unincorporated communities are located within West Cook Unorganized Territory:

- Croftville

== Demographics ==
As of the census of 2000, there were 1,671 people, 728 households, and 497 families residing in the unorganized territory. The population density was 2.9 inhabitants per square mile (1.1/km^{2}). There were 1,526 housing units at an average density of 2.6 per square mile (1.0/km^{2}).

The racial makeup of the unorganized territory was 98.48% White, 0.00% Black or African American, 0.00% Native American, 0.00% Asian, 0.00% from other races, and 1.52% from two or more races. Hispanic or Latino of any race were 0.42% of the population.

There were 728 households, out of which 24.9% had children under the age of 18 living with them, 61.0% were married couples living together, 4.1% had a female householder with no husband present, and 31.6% were non-families. 26.4% of all households were made up of individuals, and 5.4% had someone living alone who was 65 years of age or older. The average household size was 2.30 and the average family size was 2.73.

In the unorganized territory the population was spread out, with 20.8% under the age of 18, 4.8% from 18 to 24, 25.1% from 25 to 44, 33.6% from 45 to 64, and 15.7% who were 65 years of age or older. The median age was 44 years. For every 100 females, there were 107.1 males. For every 100 females age 18 and over, there were 105.9 males.

The median income for a household in the unorganized territory was $37,667, and the median income for a family was $46,083. Males had a median income of $31,307 versus $20,893 for females. The per capita income for the unorganized territory was $22,131. About 7.0% of families and 8.6% of the population were below the poverty line, including 6.9% of those under age 18 and 2.9% of those age 65 or over.

== Attractions ==
- Lake Abita, once thought to be the highest lake in Minnesota
