= Temperance River State Park =

State park in Minnesota, United States

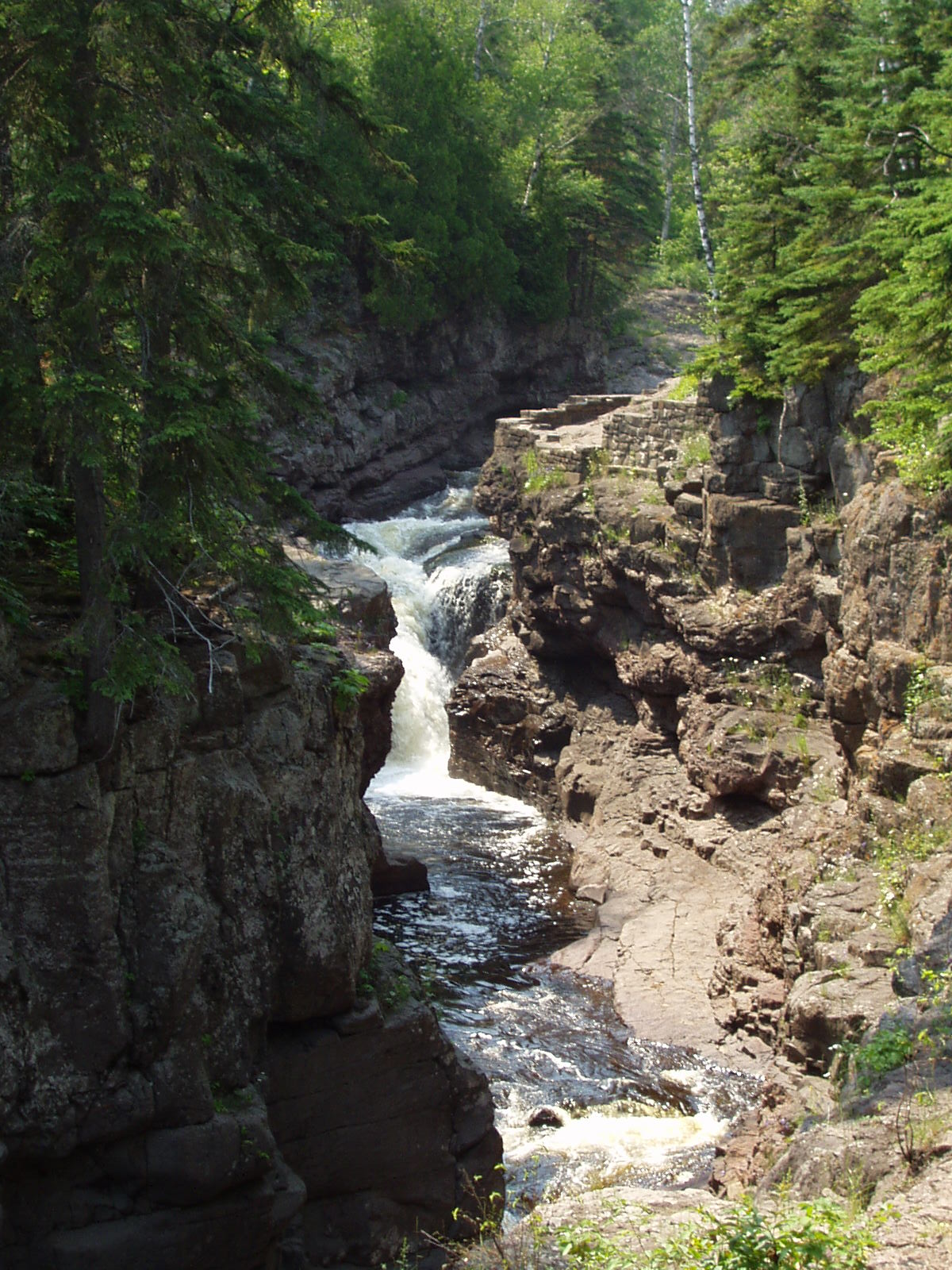
- One of the park's waterfalls

- Location within Minnesota Location within the United States
- Location: Cook, Minnesota, United States
- Coordinates: 47°33′15″N 90°52′20″W
- Area: 5,059 acres (20.47 km^{2})
- Elevation: 663 ft (202 m)
- Established: 1957
- Governing body: Minnesota Department of Natural Resources

Temperance River State Park is a state park of Minnesota, USA, located between the communities of Schroeder and Tofte on Highway 61 on the North Shore of Lake Superior. It has campsites, picnic areas, and hiking trails on both sides of the Temperance River.

== History ==
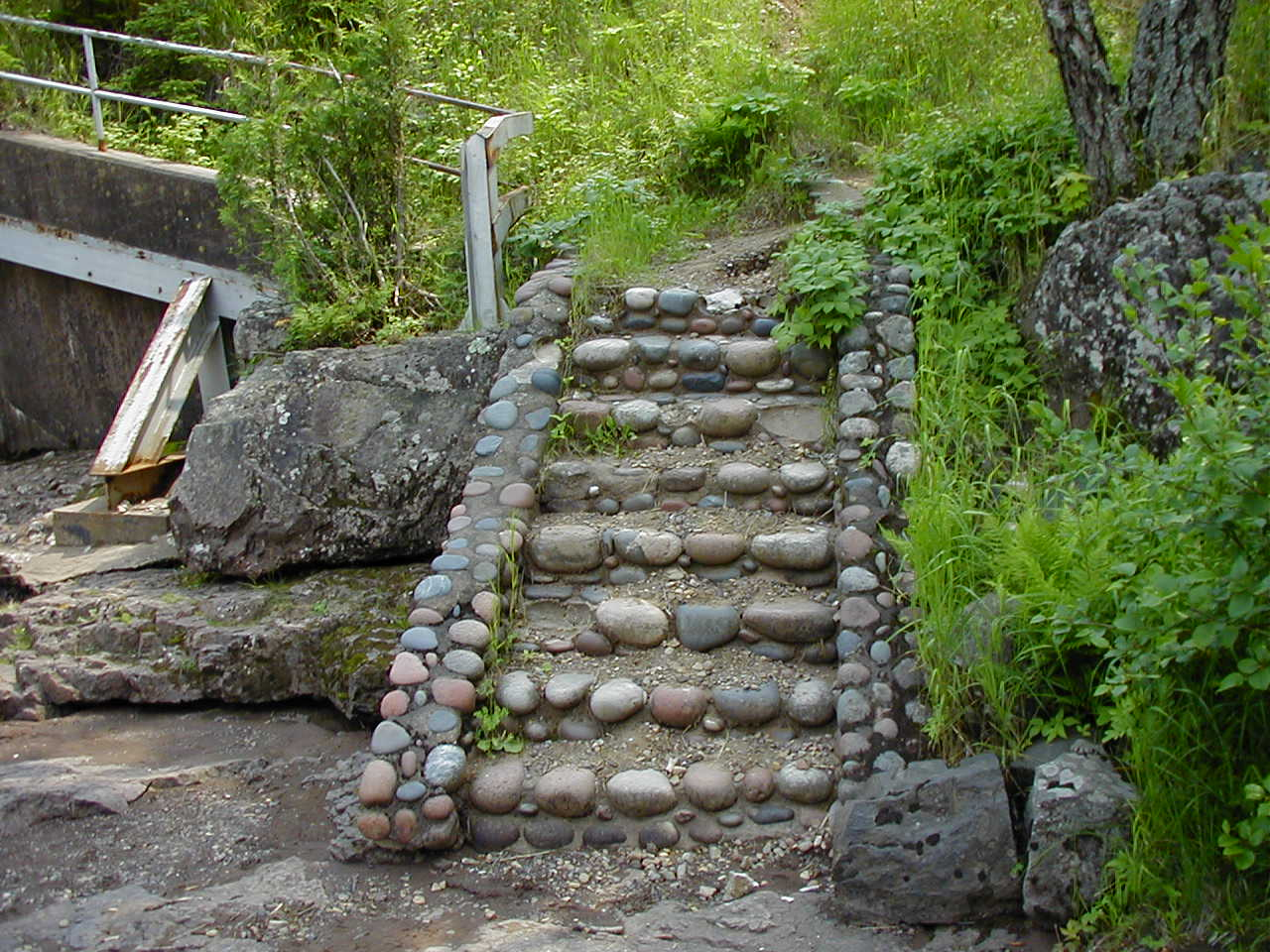
Original stone staircase created by the Civilian Conservation Corps

The Temperance River area was first permanently inhabited by Europeans in the 1830s. Settlers had to decide what to name various geographical features. When the geographical surveyors came through the area in 1864, they noticed that one particular river ran into water which was so deep that no sand bar formed at the mouth. Because there was no "bar" that river was named "Temperance."

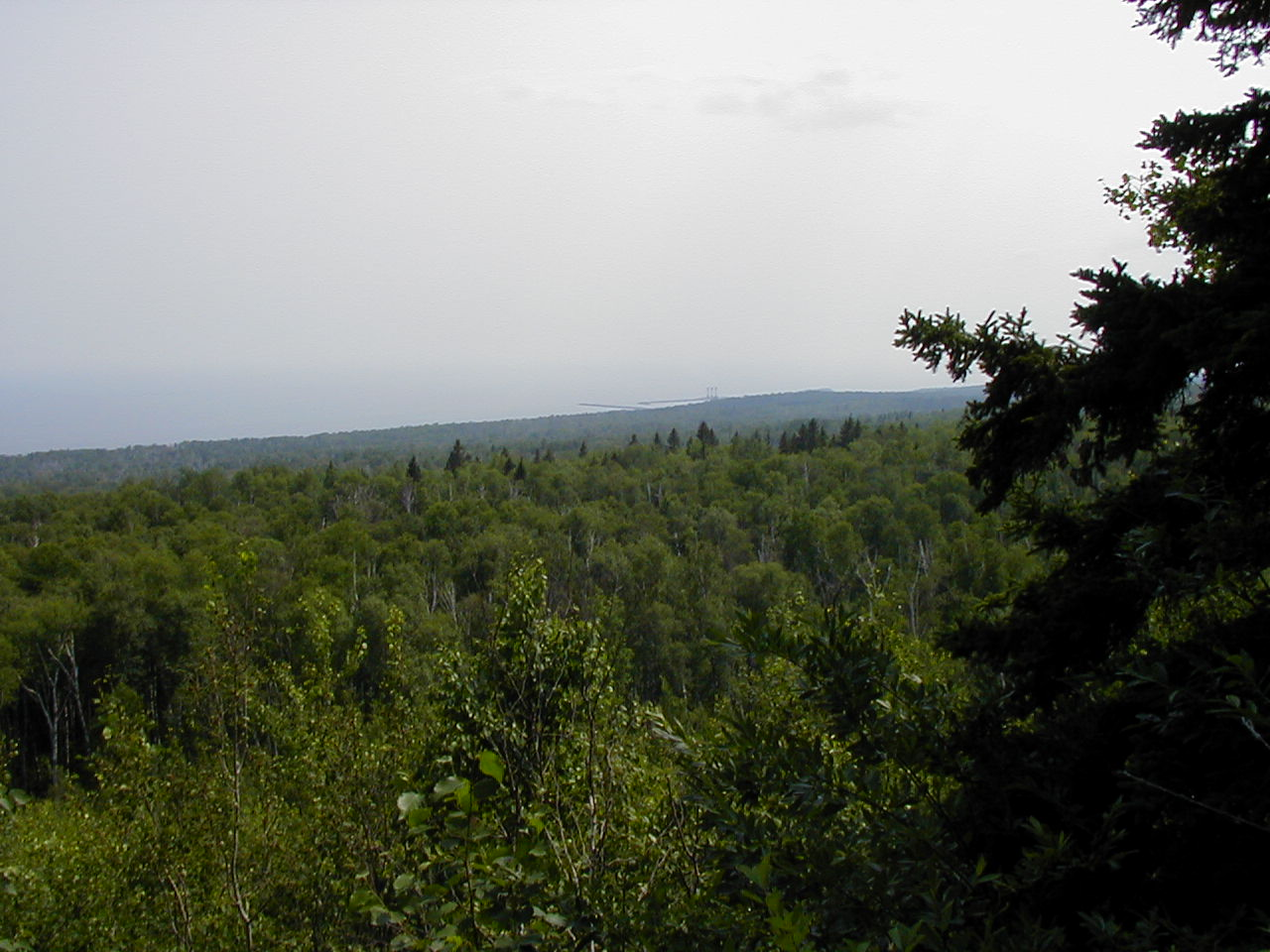
Looking from the bluff on the Superior Hiking Trail to Cross River

In the 1930s, the Civilian Conservation Corps built several overlooks at certain places along the riverside. In 1957, the state organized 539 acres (2.18 km^{2}) of land into Temperance River State Park.

== Wildlife ==
Visitors often view mammals such as white-tailed deer, snowshoe hare, red squirrel, beaver, red fox, river otter, moose, fisher, coyote, marten, northern flying squirrel, black bear and timber wolf.

Birds that roam within this park would be spruce grouse, kinglets, warblers, hawks and eagles. They seasonally migrate along shores. Woodpeckers, finches, ravens and unusual water birds as well as snowy, great gray and boreal owls are spotted by visitors during winter months.

== Attractions ==
Temperance River has two campgrounds, one on each side of the river. Both campgrounds are closer to Lake Superior than most state park campgrounds near the lake. Besides the "bar-less" mouth of the river, Temperance River has three waterfalls which can be reached by footpath. The park is also one of four Minnesota state parks to allow rock climbing, along with nearby Tettegouche State Park.

The Superior Hiking Trail passes through the park, following the river gorge before climbing to the top of Carlton Peak, nearly 1,000 feet (300 m) above Lake Superior.
