= Grand Portage, Minnesota =

Unorganized territory of Cook County, Minnesota, United States

Grand Portage, Minnesota Gichi-onigamiing (Ojibwe)
- Unorganized territory
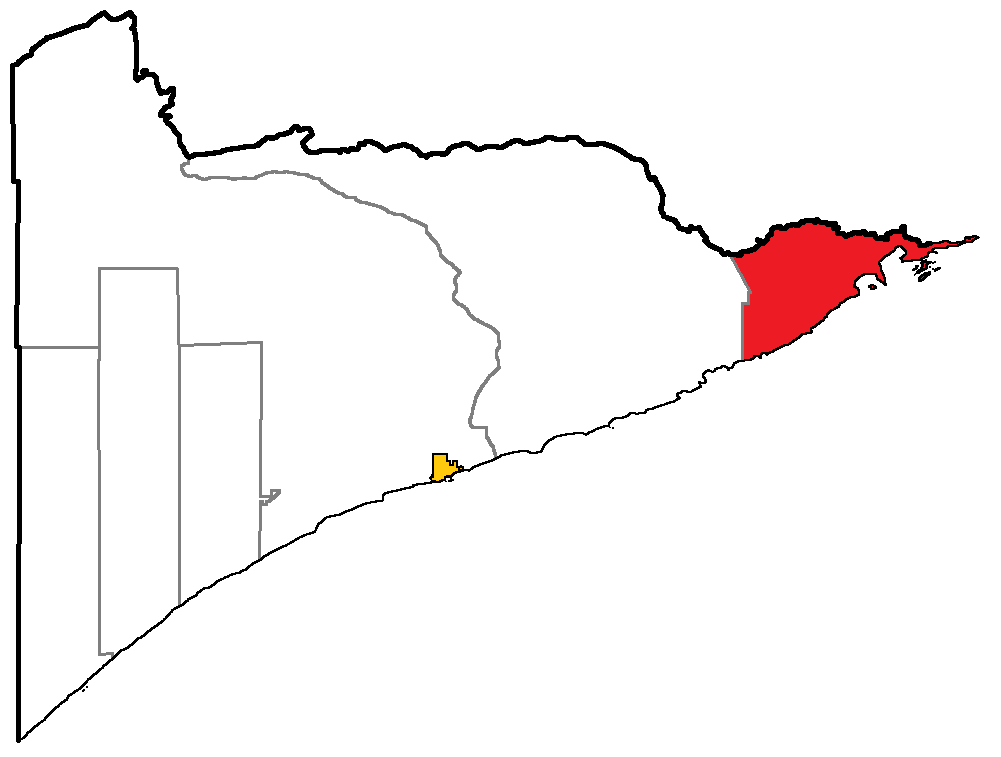
- Location of Grand Portage in Cook County, Minnesota
- Coordinates: 47°57′50″N 89°41′05″W
- Country: United States
- State: Minnesota
- County: Cook

Area
  - Total: 192.8 sq mi (499 km^{2})
  - Land: 74.47 sq mi (192.9 km^{2})
  - Water: 118.33 sq mi (306.5 km^{2})

Population (2020)
  - Total: 616
  - Density: 8.27/sq mi (3.19/km^{2})
- Time zone: UTC-6 (Central (CST))
  - Summer (DST): UTC-5 (CDT)
- Area code: 218
- GNIS feature ID: 664317

Grand Portage (Ojibwe: Gichi-onigamiing) is an unorganized territory in Cook County, Minnesota, United States, on Lake Superior, at the northeastern corner of the state near the border with northwestern Ontario. The population was 616 at the 2020 census. The unincorporated community of Grand Portage and the Grand Portage Indian Reservation are both located within Grand Portage Unorganized Territory of Cook County.

The adjacent Grand Portage National Monument, designated a National Monument in 1958, lies entirely within the boundaries of the Grand Portage Ojibwe Indian Reservation. The reconstructed depot celebrates fur trade and Ojibwe ways of life. The British North West Company built its inland headquarters at Grand Portage; the post was active until 1802.

Grand Portage is home to passenger ferries that provides access from the community to Isle Royale National Park, meaning Minnesota has access to the U.S. state of Michigan.

== Geography ==
According to the United States Census Bureau, the unorganized territory has a total area of 192.5 sq mi (498.7 km^{2}), of which 74.2 sq mi (192.2 km^{2}) is land and 118.3 sq mi (306.5 km^{2}) (61.46%) is water.

Minnesota State Highway 61 (Old U.S. Highway 61) serves as a main route in the area.

The community of Grand Portage is located 34 miles (55 km) northeast of the city of Grand Marais; and six miles (9.7 km) southwest of the Canada–US border.

=== Unincorporated communities ===
The following unincorporated communities are located within Grand Portage Unorganized Territory:

- Grand Portage
- Mineral Center
- Pigeon River

=== Climate ===
Grand Portage has a humid continental climate that is prevalent throughout the state. Its version is significantly cooler in summers than more southerly areas and more severe in winters. Precipitation is dominant in summers, but can render some high volumes of snowfall in winter.

Climate data for Grand Portage, Minnesota (1991–2020 normals, extremes 1895–present)
Month	Jan	Feb	Mar	Apr	May	Jun	Jul	Aug	Sep	Oct	Nov	Dec	Year
Record high °F (°C)	50 (10)	56 (13)	67 (19)	82 (28)	88 (31)	95 (35)	97 (36)	94 (34)	87 (31)	78 (26)	67 (19)	52 (11)	95 (35)
Mean maximum °F (°C)	39.3 (4.1)	42.7 (5.9)	53.0 (11.7)	64.6 (18.1)	77.1 (25.1)	82.6 (28.1)	86.3 (30.2)	85.2 (29.6)	79.1 (26.2)	68.5 (20.3)	53.4 (11.9)	41.6 (5.3)	88.7 (31.5)
Mean daily maximum °F (°C)	20.3 (−6.5)	24.3 (−4.3)	34.4 (1.3)	45.4 (7.4)	58.1 (14.5)	67.7 (19.8)	73.6 (23.1)	73.0 (22.8)	64.8 (18.2)	51.4 (10.8)	37.5 (3.1)	25.8 (−3.4)	48.0 (8.9)
Daily mean °F (°C)	10.5 (−11.9)	13.1 (−10.5)	23.7 (−4.6)	35.8 (2.1)	47.4 (8.6)	56.9 (13.8)	63.0 (17.2)	62.6 (17.0)	54.4 (12.4)	42.4 (5.8)	29.6 (−1.3)	17.5 (−8.1)	38.1 (3.4)
Mean daily minimum °F (°C)	0.7 (−17.4)	2.0 (−16.7)	13.0 (−10.6)	26.2 (−3.2)	36.8 (2.7)	46.1 (7.8)	52.3 (11.3)	52.1 (11.2)	44.0 (6.7)	33.3 (0.7)	21.8 (−5.7)	9.2 (−12.7)	28.1 (−2.2)
Mean minimum °F (°C)	−21.3 (−29.6)	−17.8 (−27.7)	−9.6 (−23.1)	12.7 (−10.7)	26.7 (−2.9)	35.6 (2.0)	43.6 (6.4)	43.0 (6.1)	31.7 (−0.2)	22.5 (−5.3)	3.7 (−15.7)	−13.8 (−25.4)	−24.3 (−31.3)
Record low °F (°C)	−39 (−39)	−48 (−44)	−29 (−34)	−22 (−30)	18 (−8)	25 (−4)	38 (3)	31 (−1)	24 (−4)	10 (−12)	−18 (−28)	−28 (−33)	−48 (−44)
Average precipitation inches (mm)	1.35 (34)	1.03 (26)	1.33 (34)	2.79 (71)	3.11 (79)	3.58 (91)	3.42 (87)	3.04 (77)	3.13 (80)	3.40 (86)	2.65 (67)	1.74 (44)	30.57 (776)
Average snowfall inches (cm)	12.2 (31)	8.0 (20)	8.0 (20)	7.7 (20)	0.2 (0.51)	0.0 (0.0)	0.0 (0.0)	0.0 (0.0)	0.0 (0.0)	0.5 (1.3)	6.7 (17)	11.9 (30)	55.2 (140)
Average precipitation days (≥ 0.01 in)	8.6	6.2	6.6	8.6	11.3	11.8	11.6	10.2	11.5	11.2	9.2	9.3	116.1
Average snowy days (≥ 0.1 in)	8.0	5.6	4.3	2.9	0.2	0.0	0.0	0.0	0.0	0.4	3.8	7.9	33.1
Source: NOAA

== History ==
Beginning in the 17th century Grand Portage became a major center of the fur trade. See Canadian Canoe Routes (early). It was at the point where a major canoe fur trade route of the voyageurs left the great lakes. It was so named because the route began with a huge 9 mile portage. A portage is a place where the canoes and equipment are carried over land. The French established this trade with the Native Americans until the British took it over in the 18th century after the Seven Years' War. The North West Company established the area as its regional headquarters. Soon Grand Portage became one of Britain's four main fur trading posts, along with Niagara, Detroit, and Michilimackinac. Even after the American Revolutionary War and victory by the rebellious colonists, the British continued to operate in the area. Under the Treaty of Paris in 1783, Britain had to cede former territory to the United States, including this area.

Finally with the signing of the Jay Treaty in 1796 defining the northern border between Canada and the US, British traders planned to move from Grand Portage. They wanted to avoid the taxes the US put on their operations, in its effort to encourage American traders instead. In 1802 the traders planned to move north to create a new center, what they called Fort William. In 1803 following the Louisiana Purchase, in which the U.S. acquired the lands to the west of Grand Portage, the British finally moved from Grand Portage to the new post in Canada. The North West Company moved its headquarters northward to what they named Fort William. After British fur traders abandoned the area, it rapidly declined economically until fisheries and logging became popular in the 19th century.

== Demographics ==
As of the census of 2000, there were 557 people, 247 households, and 137 families residing in the unorganized territory. The population density was 7.5 people per square mile (2.9 people/km^{2}). There were 286 housing units at an average density of 3.9 per square mile (1.5/km^{2}). The racial makeup of the unorganized territory was 35.73% White, 57.81% Native American, 0.36% from other races, and 6.10% from two or more races. Hispanic or Latino of any race were 1.97% of the population.

There were 247 households, out of which 31.2% had children under the age of 18 living with them, 32.8% were married couples living together, 14.2% had a female householder with no husband present, and 44.5% were non-families. 32.4% of all households were made up of individuals, and 6.5% had someone living alone who was 65 years of age or older. The average household size was 2.26 and the average family size was 2.82.

In the unorganized territory, the population was spread out, with 27.1% under the age of 18, 8.1% from 18 to 24, 30.5% from 25 to 44, 26.2% from 45 to 64, and 8.1% who were 65 years of age or older. The median age was 36 years. For every 100 females, there were 98.2 males. For every 100 females age 18 and over, there were 95.2 males.

The median income for a household in the unorganized territory was $30,326, and the median income for a family was $31,771. Males had a median income of $26,458 versus $22,232 for females. The per capita income for the unorganized territory was $15,782. About 18.9% of families and 21.7% of the population were below the poverty line, including 28.1% of those under age 18 and 6.3% of those age 65 or over.

== See also ==
- Grand Portage National Monument
- Grand Portage Indian Reservation
- Grand Portage (community), Minnesota – Unincorporated community located within both the reservation and unorganized territory
- Territorial era of Minnesota
