= Cook County ISD 166 =

School district in Minnesota, United States

Cook County ISD 166, also known as Cook County Schools, is a school district headquartered in Grand Marais, Minnesota.

It is in northeast Minnesota. The square mileage is 3,800 square miles (9,800 km^{2}). Its service area is all of Cook County.

== History ==
In 2021, the school board selected Christopher Lindholm as the superintendent of the school district. He was previously the superintendent of Pequot Lakes Public Schools.

== Student body ==
In 2021, it had about 500 students.

== Transportation ==
One of the bus routes, the Gunflint bus route, has the longest time duration of any school bus ride in Minnesota. While it is the second longest distance-wise, extra time is added to the Gunflint route to account for road hazards.
