= Cook County, Minnesota =

County in Minnesota, United States

- County
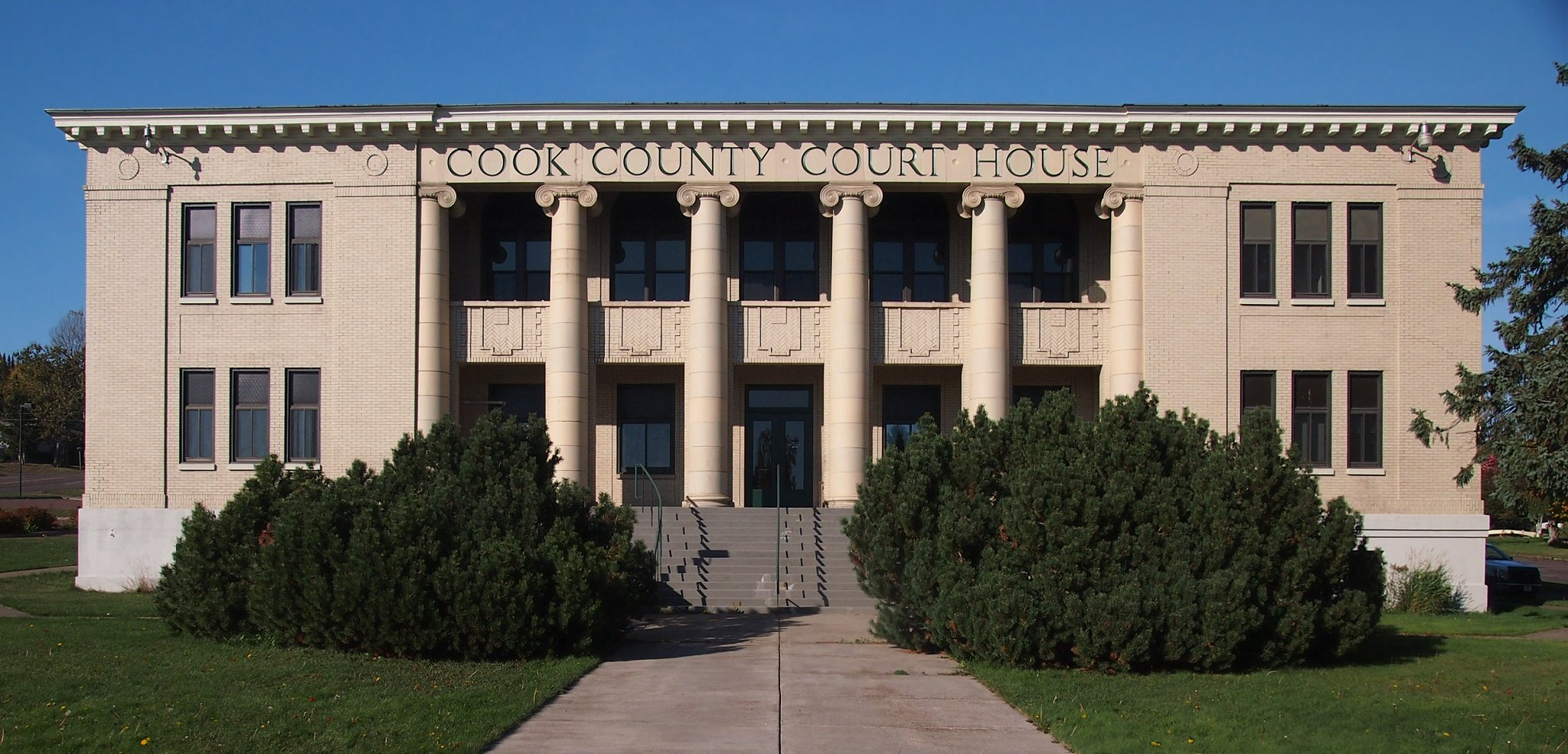
- Cook County Courthouse

- Location within the U.S. state of Minnesota
- Coordinates: 47°55′00″N 90°33′00″W
- Country: United States
- State: Minnesota
- Founded: March 9, 1874
- Named for: Michael Cook
- Seat: Grand Marais
- Largest city: Grand Marais

Area
  - Total: 3,340 sq mi (8,700 km^{2})
  - Land: 1,452 sq mi (3,760 km^{2})
  - Water: 1,887 sq mi (4,890 km^{2}) 57%

Population (2020)
  - Total: 5,600
  - Estimate (2025): 5,522 ▼
  - Density: 3.9/sq mi (1.5/km^{2})
- Time zone: UTC−6 (Central)
  - Summer (DST): UTC−5 (CDT)
- Congressional district: 8th
- Website: cookcountymn.gov

Cook County is the easternmost county in the U.S. state of Minnesota. As of the 2020 census, the population was 5,600, making it Minnesota's seventh-least populous county. Its county seat is Grand Marais. The Grand Portage Indian Reservation is in the county.

== History ==
Ojibwe people were early inhabitants of this area. The first non-indigenous people to explore the area were French fur traders, a few of whom settled in the area. By the 1830s, the French population was a few dozen. In the 1830s, settlers began arriving from New England and from upstate New York. The completion of the Erie Canal (1825) and the settling of the Black Hawk War (1831) made migration easier.

Most of Cook County's 1830s settlers came from Orange County, Vermont and Down East Maine (modern day Washington County and Hancock County). Most were fishermen and farmers. By 1845 the future Cook County contained 350 people of European descent; by 1874 there were about 2,000. They were primarily members of the Congregational Church, Methodist, and Baptist churches. By 1900 there were about 3,000 people in Cook County.

The first decade of the 20th century saw a large influx of Europeans from Germany, Scandinavia, and Ireland. These waves introduced Lutheranism and Catholicism to Cook County.

The county was created on March 9, 1874. It was named for Territorial and State Senator Michael Cook (1828-1864).

The first African American to serve as a county sheriff in the state of Minnesota was John Lyght from Lutsen, Minnesota, Lyght served as the Sheriff of Cook County from 1972 to 1994.

== Geography ==
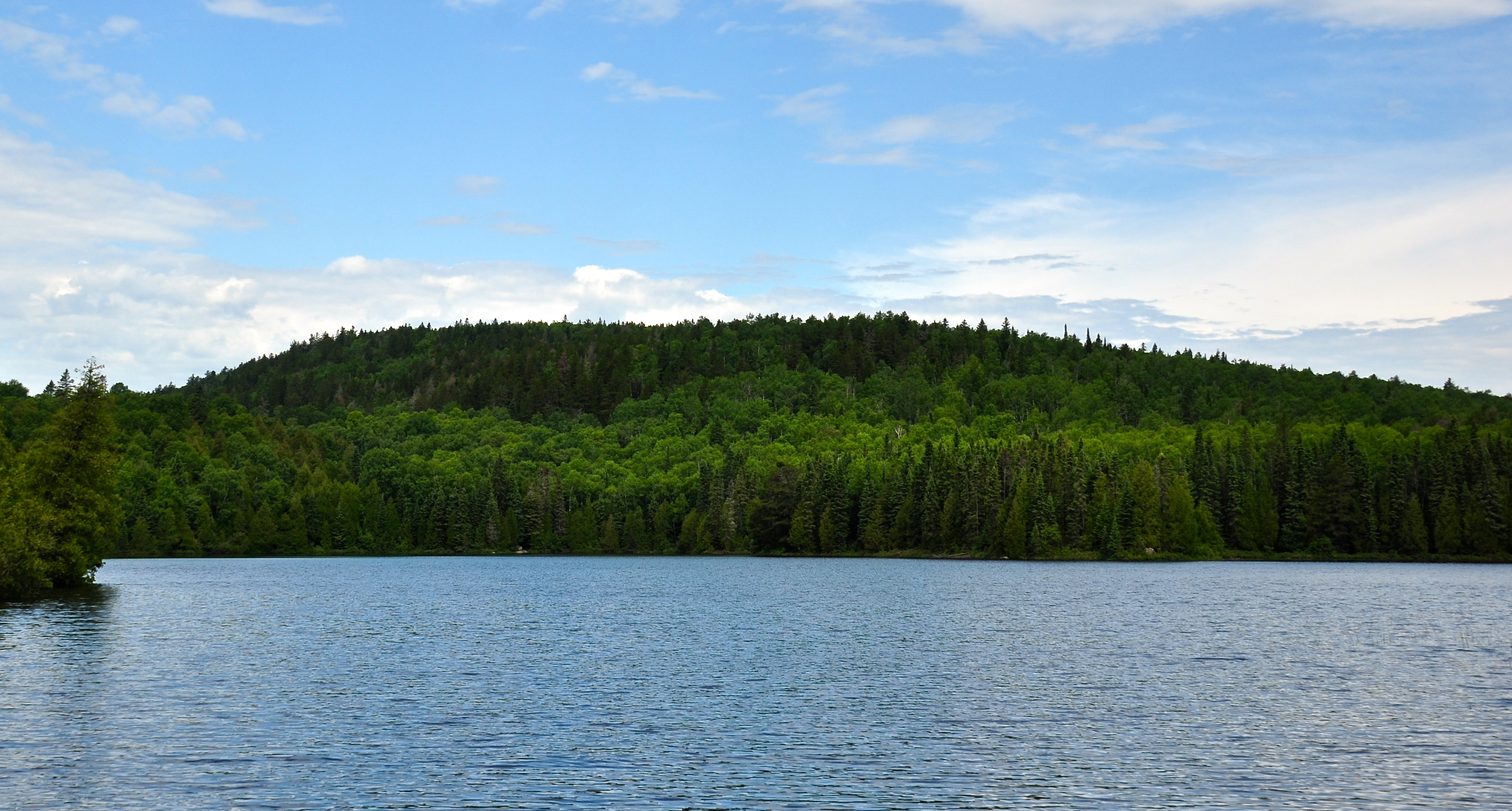
Eagle Mountain, the highest natural point in Minnesota at 2,301 feet (701 m), is located in northern Cook County.

Cook County is a rugged, heavily wooded triangle of land on Minnesota's northeastern tip. It abuts Canada's southern border and is largely surrounded by the northern end of the Great Lakes. It is heavily dotted with lakes, ponds and streams. The state's highest point is in the county, at 2,301 ft (701 m) ASL. The county has an area of 3,340 square miles (8,700 km^{2}), of which 1,452 square miles (3,760 km^{2}) is land and 1,887 square miles (4,890 km^{2}) (57%) is water. It is Minnesota's second-largest county by area. Minnesota's highest natural point, Eagle Mountain at 2,301 feet (701 m), and the highest lake, Lake Abita at 2,048 feet (624 m), are in Cook County. Lake Superior is at the county's southern border.

=== Major highways ===
- Minnesota State Highway 61
- Cook County Road 12 – Gunflint Trail

=== Adjacent counties ===
Cook County is in the extreme northeast of the state at the tip of the Arrowhead region; it is adjacent to only one other county by land. Its geographic neighbors are:

- Rainy River District, Ontario Canada - northwest
- Thunder Bay District, Ontario Canada - northeast (EST Border east of the 90th meridian west)
- Lake County - west
- Ashland County, Wisconsin - south
- Keweenaw County, Michigan - east/EST Border
- Ontonagon County, Michigan - southeast/EST Border

=== Protected areas ===
- Cascade River State Park
- Grand Portage National Monument
- Judge C. R. Magney State Park
- Kadunce River State Wayside Area
- North Shore State Trail (part)
- Pat Bayle State Forest
- Superior National Forest (part)
  - Boundary Waters Canoe Area Wilderness (part)
- Temperance River State Park

== Climate ==
Climate data for Lutsen, Minnesota
Month	Jan	Feb	Mar	Apr	May	Jun	Jul	Aug	Sep	Oct	Nov	Dec	Year
Mean daily maximum °F (°C)	22 (−6)	26 (−3)	35 (2)	47 (8)	56 (13)	64 (18)	70 (21)	70 (21)	62 (17)	52 (11)	39 (4)	27 (−3)	48 (9)
Mean daily minimum °F (°C)	4 (−16)	7 (−14)	19 (−7)	31 (−1)	39 (4)	45 (7)	52 (11)	54 (12)	47 (8)	38 (3)	26 (−3)	11 (−12)	31 (−1)
Average rainfall inches (mm)	0.9 (23)	0.7 (18)	1.4 (36)	1.9 (48)	2.8 (71)	3.5 (89)	3.3 (84)	3.3 (84)	3.6 (91)	2.5 (64)	1.6 (41)	1.1 (28)	26.4 (670)
Average snowfall inches (cm)	15.2 (39)	8.1 (21)	8.1 (21)	2.2 (5.6)	0.2 (0.51)	0 (0)	0 (0)	0 (0)	0 (0)	0.4 (1.0)	3.8 (9.7)	13.3 (34)	50.8 (129)
Source: Weatherbase

Northern Minnesota offers extreme winter weather. While the averages are low, the extremes provide more details. A third of the year is below freezing (31.9%, 116 days, or 4 months). Of those days, 21 are below zero degrees Fahrenheit (−17.8 °C).

Jan	Feb	Mar	Apr	May	June	Jul	Aug	Sep	Oct	Nov	Dec	Year
Days Below 32 °F/0 °C
20	18	19	13	3.5	0.1	0.1	0.0	0.5	5.8	16	20	116
Days Below 0 °F/-17.8 °C
8.2	6	1.5	0	0	0	0	0	0	5	0.5	4.8	21

== Demographics ==
Historical population
Census	Pop.	Note	%±
1880	65		—
1890	98		50.8%
1900	810		726.5%
1910	1,336		64.9%
1920	1,841		37.8%
1930	2,435		32.3%
1940	3,030		24.4%
1950	2,900		−4.3%
1960	3,377		16.4%
1970	3,423		1.4%
1980	4,092		19.5%
1990	3,868		−5.5%
2000	5,168		33.6%
2010	5,176		0.2%
2020	5,600		8.2%
2025 (est.)	5,522	▼	−1.4%
U.S. Decennial Census; 1790-1960 1900-1990; 1990-2000 2010-2020

=== Racial and ethnic composition ===
Cook County, Minnesota – Racial and ethnic composition Note: the US Census treats Hispanic/Latino as an ethnic category. This table excludes Latinos from the racial categories and assigns them to a separate category. Hispanics/Latinos may be of any race.
Race / Ethnicity (NH = Non-Hispanic)	Pop 1980	Pop 1990	Pop 2000	Pop 2010	Pop 2020	% 1980	% 1990	% 2000	% 2010	% 2020
White alone (NH)	3,774	3,558	4,609	4,528	4,670	92.23%	91.99%	89.18%	87.48%	83.39%
Black or African American alone (NH)	11	5	15	15	25	0.27%	0.13%	0.29%	0.29%	0.45%
Native American or Alaska Native alone (NH)	278	271	387	437	450	6.79%	7.01%	7.49%	8.44%	8.04%
Asian alone (NH)	9	20	17	27	48	0.22%	0.52%	0.33%	0.52%	0.86%
Native Hawaiian or Pacific Islander alone (NH)	x	x	2	3	1	x	x	0.04%	0.06%	0.02%
Other race alone (NH)	14	0	3	1	25	0.34%	0.00%	0.06%	0.02%	0.45%
Mixed race or Multiracial (NH)	x	x	96	107	258	x	x	1.86%	2.07%	4.61%
Hispanic or Latino (any race)	6	14	39	58	123	0.15%	0.36%	0.75%	1.12%	2.20%
Total	4,092	3,868	5,168	5,176	5,600	100.00%	100.00%	100.00%	100.00%	100.00%

=== 2020 census ===
As of the 2020 census, the county had a population of 5,600. The median age was 53.1 years. 15.9% of residents were under the age of 18 and 30.6% of residents were 65 years of age or older. For every 100 females there were 101.9 males, and for every 100 females age 18 and over there were 99.3 males age 18 and over.

The racial makeup of the county was 83.7% White, 0.4% Black or African American, 8.2% American Indian and Alaska Native, 0.9% Asian, <0.1% Native Hawaiian and Pacific Islander, 0.9% from some other race, and 5.9% from two or more races. Hispanic or Latino residents of any race comprised 2.2% of the population.

<0.1% of residents lived in urban areas, while 100.0% lived in rural areas.

There were 2,711 households in the county, of which 19.4% had children under the age of 18 living in them. Of all households, 47.3% were married-couple households, 22.4% were households with a male householder and no spouse or partner present, and 22.5% were households with a female householder and no spouse or partner present. About 34.4% of all households were made up of individuals and 15.8% had someone living alone who was 65 years of age or older.

There were 5,936 housing units, of which 54.3% were vacant. Among occupied housing units, 77.8% were owner-occupied and 22.2% were renter-occupied. The homeowner vacancy rate was 1.9% and the rental vacancy rate was 16.8%.

=== 2000 census ===
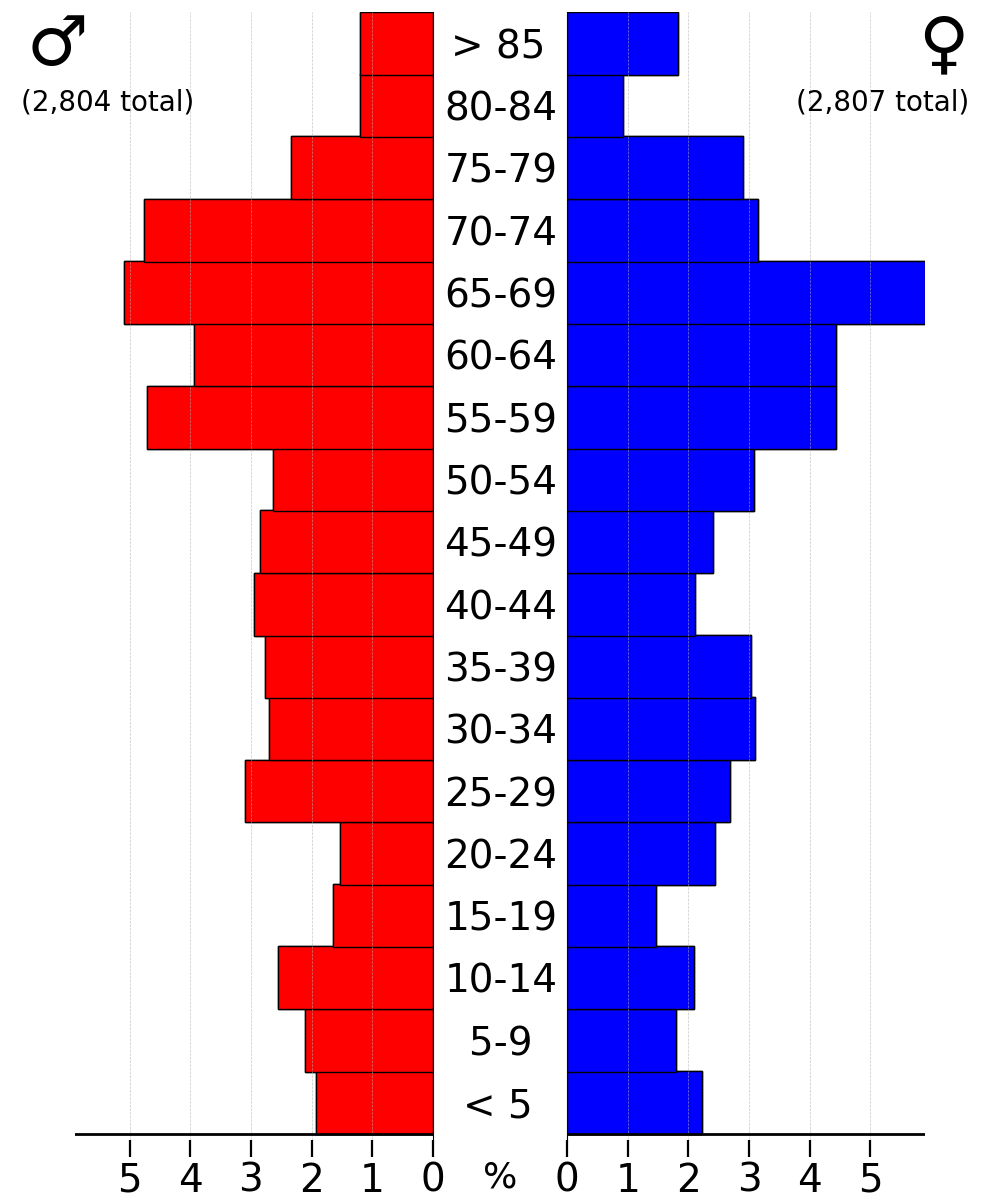
2022 US Census population pyramid for Cook County, from ACS 5-year estimates

As of the census of 2000, there were 5,168 people, 2,350 households, and 1,438 families in the county. The population density was 3.56 per square mile (1.37/km^{2}). There were 4,708 housing units at an average density of 3.24 per square mile (1.25/km^{2}). The racial makeup of the county was 89.45% White, 7.59% Native American, 0.33% Asian, 0.29% Black or African American, 0.04% Pacific Islander, 0.25% from other races, and 2.05% from two or more races. 0.75% of the population were Hispanic or Latino of any race. 21.6% were of German, 17.7% Norwegian, 11.5% Swedish, 7.2% Irish and 5.4% English ancestry.

There were 2,350 households, of which 24.4% had children under the age of 18 living with them, 52.0% were married couples living together, 6.1% had a female householder with no husband present, and 38.8% were non-families. 32.5% of all households were made up of individuals, and 10.8% had someone living alone who was 65 years of age or older. The average household size was 2.17 and the average family size was 2.73.

The county population contained 20.4% under the age of 18, 5.4% from 18 to 24, 25.8% from 25 to 44, 31.2% from 45 to 64, and 17.2% who were 65 years of age or older. The median age was 44. For every 100 females there were 99.7 males. For every 100 females age 18 and over, there were 98.5 males.

The median income for a household in the county was $36,640, and the median income for a family was $47,132. Males had a median income of $31,211 versus $23,650 for females. The per capita income for the county was $21,775. About 8.1% of families and 10.1% of the population were below the poverty line, including 12.2% of those under age 18 and 6.8% of those age 65 or over.

== Communities ==
=== City ===
- Grand Marais (county seat)

=== Census-designated place ===
- Lutsen

=== Unincorporated communities ===
- Croftville
- Grand Portage
- Hovland
- Maple Hill
- Martin Landing
- Mineral Center
- Pigeon River
- Schroeder
- Taconite Harbor
- Tofte

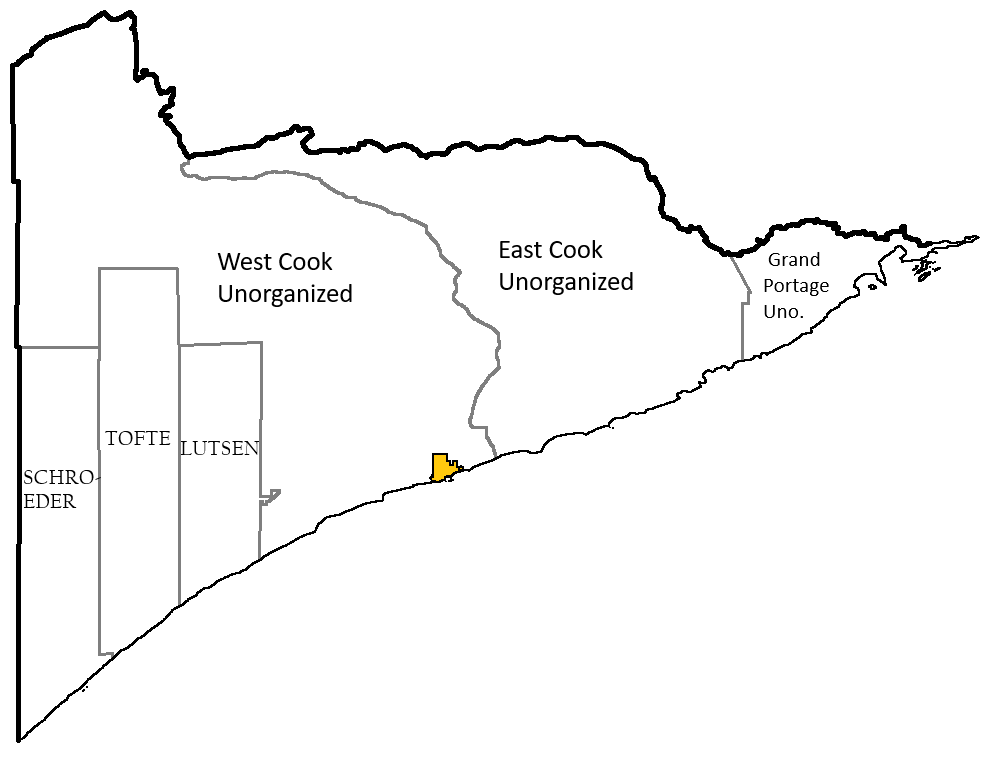
Townships and Unorganized Territories of Cook County

=== Townships ===
- Lutsen Township
- Schroeder Township
- Tofte Township

=== Unorganized territories ===
- East Cook
- Grand Portage
- West Cook

=== Ghost towns ===
- Chippewa City
- Colvill

== Government and politics ==
Cook County was a Republican-leaning bellwether in all but four elections from 1900 to 2000, with the exceptions being 1912, 1960, 1976 (by only 16 votes), and 1988 (by only 2 votes). The county was one of the rare white-majority rural counties to have its margin increase for Joe Biden in 2020 relative to Barack Obama's 2012 margin, with 66 percent of voters choosing the Democratic nominee. In both 2016 and 2020, it was the largest county by area in the contiguous states where Trump lost every precinct, although several counties in Hawaii and county equivalents in western Alaska and the northern Panhandle beat it in both elections. (Note: In both 2016 and 2020 Maui County in Hawaii alongside Kusilvak Census Area and Yakutat City and Borough in Alaska beat Cook County as the largest county-equivalent with no Trump precincts, whilst Hawaii County and Nome Census Area also beat in it 2016, and Sitka City and Borough in 2020.) In 2024, the county shifted even further to the left, with Kamala Harris' vote share of over 66% being the highest ever by a Democratic presidential nominee.

=== Elections and officeholders ===
United States presidential election results for Cook County, Minnesota
Year	Republican		Democratic		Third party(ies)	
Year	No.	%	No.	%	No.	%
1884	46	85.19%	8	14.81%	0	0.00%
1888	24	45.28%	29	54.72%	0	0.00%
1892	68	51.52%	19	14.39%	45	34.09%
1896	81	42.19%	107	55.73%	4	2.08%
1900	81	52.60%	65	42.21%	8	5.19%
1904	207	82.80%	31	12.40%	12	4.80%
1908	255	77.98%	42	12.84%	30	9.17%
1912	30	8.62%	65	18.68%	253	72.70%
1916	125	34.44%	162	44.63%	76	20.94%
1920	467	72.85%	98	15.29%	76	11.86%
1924	471	67.97%	29	4.18%	193	27.85%
1928	609	72.59%	219	26.10%	11	1.31%
1932	418	43.27%	492	50.93%	56	5.80%
1936	387	32.14%	793	65.86%	24	1.99%
1940	673	49.27%	686	50.22%	7	0.51%
1944	513	48.12%	545	51.13%	8	0.75%
1948	674	47.94%	688	48.93%	44	3.13%
1952	946	65.06%	503	34.59%	5	0.34%
1956	1,078	61.67%	668	38.22%	2	0.11%
1960	987	60.15%	650	39.61%	4	0.24%
1964	764	43.86%	976	56.03%	2	0.11%
1968	853	49.33%	777	44.94%	99	5.73%
1972	1,047	57.62%	742	40.84%	28	1.54%
1976	1,034	48.54%	1,018	47.79%	78	3.66%
1980	1,147	50.62%	871	38.44%	248	10.94%
1984	1,219	51.63%	1,129	47.82%	13	0.55%
1988	1,078	49.36%	1,080	49.45%	26	1.19%
1992	878	33.54%	1,005	38.39%	735	28.07%
1996	1,010	39.94%	1,169	46.22%	350	13.84%
2000	1,295	45.92%	1,171	41.52%	354	12.55%
2004	1,489	45.08%	1,733	52.47%	81	2.45%
2008	1,240	37.04%	2,019	60.30%	89	2.66%
2012	1,221	36.75%	1,993	59.99%	108	3.25%
2016	1,156	34.05%	1,912	56.32%	327	9.63%
2020	1,203	31.61%	2,496	65.58%	107	2.81%
2024	1,142	31.20%	2,416	66.01%	102	2.79%

County Board of Commissioners
Position	Name	District
Commissioner	Debra White	District 1
Commissioner	Stacey Hawkins	District 2
Commissioner	David Mills	District 3
Commissioner	Ann Sullivan	District 4
Commissioner	Ginny Storlie	District 5

State Legislature (2018-2020)
Position	Name	Affiliation	District
Senate	Grant Hauschild	Democrat	District 3
House of Representatives	Roger Skraba	Republican	District 3A

U.S Congress (2018-2020)
Position	Name	Affiliation	District
House of Representatives	Pete Stauber	Republican	8th
Senate	Amy Klobuchar	Democrat	N/A
Senate	Tina Smith	Democrat	N/A

== Education ==
Public education is provided by Cook County Schools.

== See also ==
- National Register of Historic Places listings in Cook County, Minnesota
