= Grm =

Grm or GRM may refer to:

== Business ==
- Gross Rent Multiplier, a real estate concept
- Palladium International (formerly GRM International), a consulting and management company

== European villages ==
- Grm (Zenica), Bosnia and Herzegovina
- Grm pri Podzemlju, Metlika, southeastern Slovenia
- Grm, Ivančna Gorica, central Slovenia
- Grm, Trebnje, eastern Slovenia
- Grm, Velike Lašče, central Slovenia

== Sport ==
- Daša Grm (born 1991), Slovenian figure skater
- Garry Rogers Motorsport, an Australian V8 Supercar racing team
- Grassroots Motorsports, a racing magazine

== Other uses ==
- Grand Marais/Cook County Airport (IATA code), airport in Grand Marais, Minnesota
- GRM, a class of genes coding for the metabotropic glutamate receptor
- Groupe de Recherches Musicales, a French concrete music collective
