= National Register of Historic Places listings in Cook County, Minnesota =

Location of Cook County in Minnesota

This is a list of the properties and districts on the National Register of Historic Places in Cook County, Minnesota, United States. The locations of National Register properties and districts for which the latitude and longitude coordinates are included below, may be seen in an online map.

There are 15 properties and districts listed on the National Register in the county.

This National Park Service list is complete through NPS recent listings posted October 2, 2026.

== Current listings ==
	Name on the Register	Image	Date listed	Location	City or town	Description
1	Amboy and George Spencer Shipwreck Sites	Amboy and George Spencer Shipwreck Sites	April 14, 1994 (#94000341)	Lake Superior shore about a mile southwest of Sugar Loaf Cove; 47°28′41″N 90°59′59″W	Schroeder vicinity	Remains of an 1884 wooden bulk freighter and its 1874 schooner-barge consort, associated with the nationally significant Great Lakes iron ore trade and the infamous 1905 Mataafa Storm that sank them.
2	Bally Blacksmith Shop	Bally Blacksmith Shop	August 13, 1986 (#86001548)	Broadway and First Streets; 47°45′03″N 90°19′58″W	Grand Marais	Rare intact and operational example of an early-20th-century blacksmith shop—built in 1911—and a representative of the utilitarian, false-front commercial buildings that once characterized Minnesota's small-town streetscapes. Now maintained by the Cook County Historical Society.
3	Cascade River Wayside	Cascade River Wayside	August 4, 2003 (#03000733)	3481 Minnesota Highway 61; 47°42′25″N 90°31′24″W	Cascade River State Park	Roadside park with eight contributing properties built 1936–38, representative of Minnesota's early state highway recreational development in collaboration with the National Park Service and the Civilian Conservation Corps. Also noted for its National Park Service rustic landscape architecture.
4	Chik Wauk Lodge	Chik Wauk Lodge	June 27, 2007 (#07000599)	28 Moose Pond Road; 48°10′08″N 90°52′51″W	West Cook	Well-preserved 1933 lodge representative of the rustic, family-owned fishing resorts that flourished in the Boundary Waters region from the 1920s to the early '60s. Now a museum and nature center.
5	Church of St. Francis Xavier-Catholic	Church of St. Francis Xavier-Catholic	July 31, 1986 (#86002119)	1382 Minnesota Highway 61; 47°45′29″N 90°18′43″W	Grand Marais vicinity	1895 church, one of Minnesota's few remaining 19th-century Indian missions and the only surviving structure of the Ojibwe settlement named Chippewa City. Now maintained by the Cook County Historical Society.
6	Clearwater Lodge	Clearwater Lodge	December 2, 1985 (#85003032)	Off County Road 66; 48°04′10″N 90°22′57″W	Grand Marais vicinity	Resort lodge built 1925–26, the oldest surviving guest accommodations in the Gunflint Trail area and a key representative of Cook County's tourism industry.
7	Cook County Courthouse	Cook County Courthouse	May 9, 1983 (#83000902)	411 Second Street; 47°45′09″N 90°20′21″W	Grand Marais	Courthouse built 1911–12, significant as the longstanding seat of Cook County's government and for its locally distinctive Neoclassical architecture.
8	Fowl Lake Site	Fowl Lake Site	December 30, 1974 (#74001013)	Address restricted	Hovland vicinity	Island site with rare Old Copper Complex resources, dating to around 3000 BCE; the region's most important archaeological site for this little-known Archaic period culture.
9	Grand Portage National Monument	Grand Portage National Monument	October 15, 1966 (#66000111)	Off Minnesota Highway 61 within Grand Portage Indian Reservation; 47°57′45″N 89°41′05″W	Grand Portage vicinity	Partially reconstructed wilderness headquarters of the North West Company in use 1778–1802, plus the sites of a key portage and its terminal outpost; crucial sites associated with the North American fur trade and the exploration and colonization of the northwest.
10	Height of Land	Height of Land	October 18, 1974 (#74001012)	Between North and South Lake in Superior National Forest; 48°06′01″N 90°33′58″W	Grand Marais vicinity	80-rod (1,300 ft; 400 m) portage on the Laurentian Divide, a key transition between upstream and downstream paddling for voyageurs of the fur trade era, who celebrated its crossing with a ritual rite of passage.
11	Hungry Jack Lake Summer Home Group	Hungry Jack Lake Summer Home Group	September 30, 2026 (#100013444)	Address Restricted	Grand Marais vicinity	
12	Lightkeeper's House	Lightkeeper's House	November 28, 1978 (#78001528)	12 South Broadway; 47°44′56″N 90°19′58″W	Grand Marais	1896 lighthouse keeper's residence, representative of late-19th-century settlement on the North Shore and its dependence on Lake Superior. Now a historic house museum.
13	Naniboujou Club Lodge	Naniboujou Club Lodge	October 21, 1982 (#82000558)	Minnesota Highway 61; 47°49′01″N 90°02′57″W	Grand Marais vicinity	Lodge built 1928–9 with unique Cree-inspired interior design, stemming from one of the most elaborate recreational developments planned in northern Minnesota.
14	Schroeder Lumber Company Bunkhouse	Schroeder Lumber Company Bunkhouse	July 31, 1986 (#86002120)	Minnesota Highway 61; 47°32′34″N 90°53′42″W	Schroeder vicinity	Lumberjacks' bunkhouse built circa 1900, the last remaining structure of one of the North Shore's largest logging operations, active 1895–1905.
15	Jim Scott Fishhouse	Jim Scott Fishhouse	October 23, 1986 (#86002904)	Minnesota Highway 61 at Fifth Avenue; 47°44′56″N 90°20′24″W	Grand Marais	1907 processing and storage building representative of the important commercial fishing industry of the upper North Shore.

== See also ==
- List of National Historic Landmarks in Minnesota
- National Register of Historic Places listings in Minnesota
