= Cross River Heritage Center =

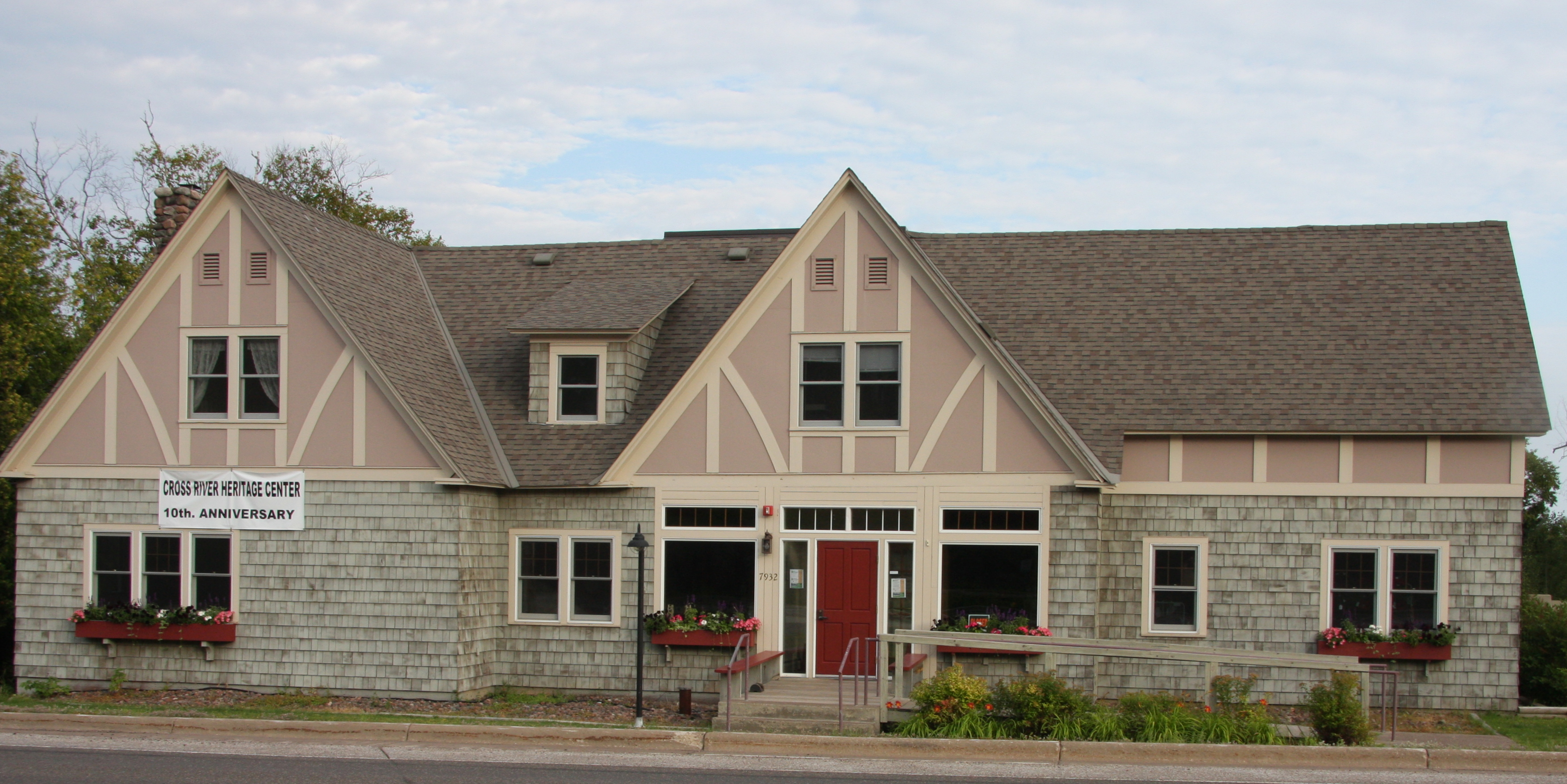
- The Cross River Heritage Center viewed from the northwest

- Location within Minnesota Location within the United States
- Established: 2002
- Location: 7932 West Highway 61, Schroeder, Minnesota
- Coordinates: 47°32′36.5″N 90°53′49.5″W

The Cross River Heritage Center is a museum in Schroeder, Minnesota, United States. Operated by the Schroeder Area Historical Society, it collects and interprets the history of the local area and the greater North Shore of Lake Superior. The center opened in 2002 in a Tudor Revival building constructed in 1929 as the Stickney Inn and Store. The building is located on the south side of Minnesota State Highway 61 near the west bank of the Cross River.

== Stickney Inn and Store ==
In 1921, Horace T. Stickney (1885–1983) purchased a 13-acre (5.3 ha) parcel of land along the Cross River in Schroeder from Hedley Redmyer. The parcel had been part of the Schroeder Lumber Company's logging camp. At the time of the purchase, the property included the Schroeder Lumber Company Bunkhouse, the logging superintendent's house, a shed, and an office building. Stickney called it a "depressed place" because of past logging and the burned landscape. His first store, built in 1922, burned down when the gas stove malfunctioned during food preparation.

After the fire, local artisans and an unnamed architect helped Stickney build a new structure featuring prominent, half-timbered gables. On June 6, 1929, the Cook County News Herald reported that the Stickney Inn featured bedrooms and a large dining room as well as a confectionary and store. The first floor had a grocery store, a kitchen, a post office, a dining room, and a living room with a large stone fireplace. The second floor had seven tourist bedrooms for 15–20 people. It was one of the first buildings in Schroeder to have indoor bathrooms.

Soon Stickney received requests for cabin rentals. In 1930 he built a log cabin, measuring 16 by 20 feet (5 by 6 m), behind the inn overlooking the Cross River. After he completed a second cabin, a Minnesota tourism pamphlet described the site as "Stickney's Resort". By 1936, Stickney had built eight cabins with views of the river and the shores of Lake Superior.

The inn served as a Civilian Conservation Corps (CCC) winter headquarters for workers who arrived on the North Shore in 1933. They constructed 135 miles (217 km) of telephone line, 40 miles (64 km) of truck lines, thirty bridges, three dams, and sixteen United States Forest Service buildings. The single-lane steel bridge (built in 1915) over the Cross River was replaced in 1932.

A small sign on Highway 61 advertised the Stickney Store and Cabins. It was a destination on the North Shore, and the Northland Bus Depot maintained a depot stop at the inn throughout the 1940s and 1950s.

The Stickneys did not offer organized activities; tourists were attracted to the hikes, trout fishing, and games of horseshoes. The inn did have an ample living room and a piano used for songfests and dancing. Author Florence Page Jacques wrote about her visit to the Stickney Inn and Store on November 13, 1942. She noted that she was surprised to see the inn's three modern bathrooms and to stay warm in the snug, airtight building.

Horace and Nell Stickney sold the inn to Horace's nephew, Harry Stickney Lamb (1909–1971), in 1955. Harry and Doris Mae Lamb (1913–2003) moved to Schroeder in December 1954. After Harry Lamb became postmaster in 1955, they renamed the inn Lamb's Resort.

In the early 1950s, the Erie Mining Company started construction of a taconite loading facility 2.5 miles (4.0 km) south of Lamb's Resort. Harry Lamb made an agreement with the ore carriers to supply them with groceries.

The third generation to live and work in the Stickney/Lamb store took over in 1965. Harry Lamb's son, Horace "Skip" Lamb, purchased the resort with his wife, Linda. In 1976 the Lambs separated the Stickney Inn and Store from the resort property, moved the post office into an empty Pure Oil station, and sold the inn to Bill and Gloria Jordon. The Jordons renamed the inn the Cross River General Store.

== Cross River Heritage Center ==
The Minnesota Department of Transportation (MnDOT) purchased and condemned the inn and store in preparation for highway repairs and bridge replacement in 1998. The Schroeder Area Historical Society persuaded MnDOT to transfer the title of the Stickney Inn and Store building to Schroeder Township in 1998. With secured funding and volunteer support, the Schroeder Area Historical Society completed the building's restoration in 2002 and began operating the building as the Cross River Heritage Center.

== See also ==
- List of museums in Minnesota
