= Jim Scott Fishhouse =

- U.S. National Register of Historic Places
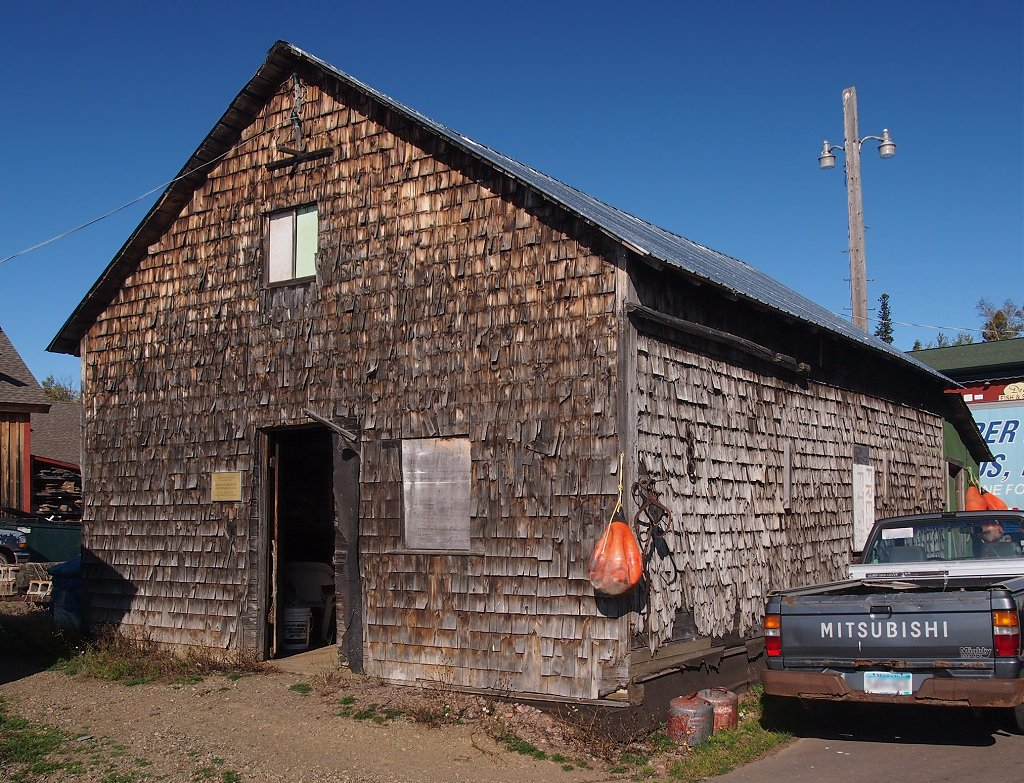
- The Jim Scott Fishhouse from the southeast

- Location within Minnesota Location within the United States
- Location: Minnesota State Highway 61 at Fifth Avenue, Grand Marais, Minnesota
- Coordinates: 47°44′55.8″N 90°20′23.9″W
- Area: .25 acres (0.10 ha)
- Built: 1907
- Built by: James Garfield Scott
- NRHP reference No.: 86002904
- Designated: October 23, 1986

The Jim Scott Fishhouse is a historic building in Grand Marais, Minnesota, United States, built in 1907 by a family-owned commercial fishing outfit. During the fishing season it served as a place to dress and pack fish, while over the winter it was used for the storage and repair of fishing gear. The Jim Scott Fishhouse was listed on the National Register of Historic Places in 1986 for having local significance in the theme of commerce. It was nominated for being a representative of the important commercial fishing industry on the upper North Shore of Lake Superior.

== Description ==
The Jim Scott Fishhouse stands on the waterfront of Grand Marais Harbor. It is a rectangular, wood-frame building with a footprint of about 30 by 25 feet (9.1 by 7.6 m). A wood-frame shed addition measuring 10 by 25 feet (3.0 by 7.6 m) is attached to the north wall. The south wall is pierced by a wooden door. The main section has a gable roof covered in tar paper, while the shed has tar paper walls and a metal roof. The building was comparable in size to other fishhouses in the region, but the wood shingled exterior walls of the main section add a decorative flair lacking in similar structures, which were usually sided with plain boards.

== History ==
James Garfield Scott (1881–1947), better known as Jim Scott, was a second-generation commercial fisherman. His father Andrew Jackson Scott had settled in Grand Marais in the 1870s, initially working as a trapper before becoming a commercial fisherman around 1900. Jim Scott, born in Grand Marais in 1881, joined his father in business as soon as he was old enough. The younger Scott purchased this waterfront property in 1907 and built the fishhouse and a dock.

The waters of western Lake Superior teemed with schools of lake whitefish and lake trout. Since the initial Euro-American settlement of the North Shore in the 1850s there had been some commercial fishing. However transportation to market was an issue until the mid-1880s, when regular steamboat service to Duluth and rail distribution to Minneapolis–Saint Paul were firmly established, allowing the North Shore fishing industry to achieve commercial significance. Residents all along the North Shore entered the business, many receiving loans from Duluth-based fish wholesalers to acquire boats and gear.

Shortly after the completion of his fishhouse, Jim Scott entered into a business partnership with Eugene Clark and permitted the unmarried man to live in a loft above the workspace. The two achieved success not only as fishermen but as fishing boat builders before Clark died in 1915. Scott's son Roger ultimately joined his father in the business when he came of age.

The Scotts started their fishing season as early as possible each year, as soon as the ice was gone from Grand Marais Harbor. On a typical day they were out of the harbor by 5 a.m., motoring four hours to cover 35 miles (56 km) to a location near Outer Island where lake trout were abundant. They would spend six hours playing out over four miles (6.4 km) of fishing net and reeling it back in. They cleaned the day's catch on the way back to harbor, where they packed it in ice at the fishhouse. In fall they would fish for herring near Duluth.

In the mid-1930s Jim and Roger Scott built a new boat for themselves, a 35-foot (11 m) fishing tug that could handle their long trips out on the lake and also serve as a workboat in the harbor. They named her the Nee-Gee, an anglicization of the word for "friend" in the Ojibwe language. It had a 110-horsepower engine, a 24-inch (61 cm) propeller, a large cabin that opened onto the bow, and was designed so a crew of three could set the fishing nets without leaving the cabin. The Nee-Gee was also used around the harbor to add logs to timber rafts about to be towed to paper mills in Ashland, Wisconsin.

Jim Scott was one of the most successful fishermen in the area. He also became an industry and community leader in Grand Marais. He helped found a fisherman's cooperative, a trucking company for fish and freight, and a congregational church, plus served as president of the local bank from 1920 to his death in 1947. He collapsed and died while working on the dock near the fishhouse.

The Great Lakes commercial fishery nearly collapsed as well, depleted by years of overfishing and the accidental introduction of the parasitic sea lamprey, but the industry survived by shifting to herring and smelt. The fishhouse remained in the Scott family for decades and continued to serve its original purpose into the 1980s. It was still owned by two of Jim Scott's grandchildren in 2004, though they were doing their fish processing in an adjacent building and using the historic structure for boat and gear storage. A 2008 travel guide mentions the fishhouse as having become part of the North House Folk School campus. The Nee-Gee fishing tug remained in service into the 1960s. Eventually taken out of the water, it was donated to the Cook County Historical Society in the late '90s. It is on public view in Grand Marais's municipal waterfront park and is gradually being restored by volunteers.

== See also ==
- National Register of Historic Places listings in Cook County, Minnesota
