= Grand Marais/Cook County Seaplane Base =

- IATA: none; ICAO: none; FAA LID: 0G5

Summary
- Airport type: Public
- Owner: Cook County
- Serves: Grand Marais, Minnesota
- Elevation AMSL: 1,635 ft (498 m)
- Coordinates: 47°49′N 090°23′W
- Website: www.boreal.org/airport/

Map
- Location of airport in Minnesota 0G5 (the United States)

Runways
Direction	Length		Surface
Direction	ft	m	Surface
9/27	15,000	4,572	Water
3/21	3,000	914	Water

Statistics (2003)
- Aircraft operations: 550
- Source: Federal Aviation Administration

Grand Marais/Cook County Seaplane Base (FAA LID: 0G5) is a county-owned, public-use seaplane base located seven miles (11 km) northwest of the central business district of Grand Marais, a city in Cook County, Minnesota, United States.

It is located on the shore of Devil's Track Lake and was formerly part of Devil's Track Municipal Airport (FAA: GRM). That airport had a runway which closed after the opening of Grand Marais/Cook County Airport (FAA: CKC), located one mile (1.6 km) to the north.

== Facilities and aircraft ==
Grand Marais/Cook County Seaplane Base covers an area of 6 acres (2.4 ha) at an elevation of 1,635 feet (498 m) above mean sea level. It has two seaplane landing areas: 9/27 is 15,000 by 1,500 feet (4,570 m × 460 m) and 3/21 is 3,000 by 2,000 feet (910 m × 610 m). For the 12-month period ending August 31, 2003, the airport had 550 general aviation aircraft operations, an average of 46 per month.

== See also ==
- Grand Marais/Cook County Airport
- List of airports in Minnesota
