= Bally Blacksmith Shop =

- U.S. National Register of Historic Places
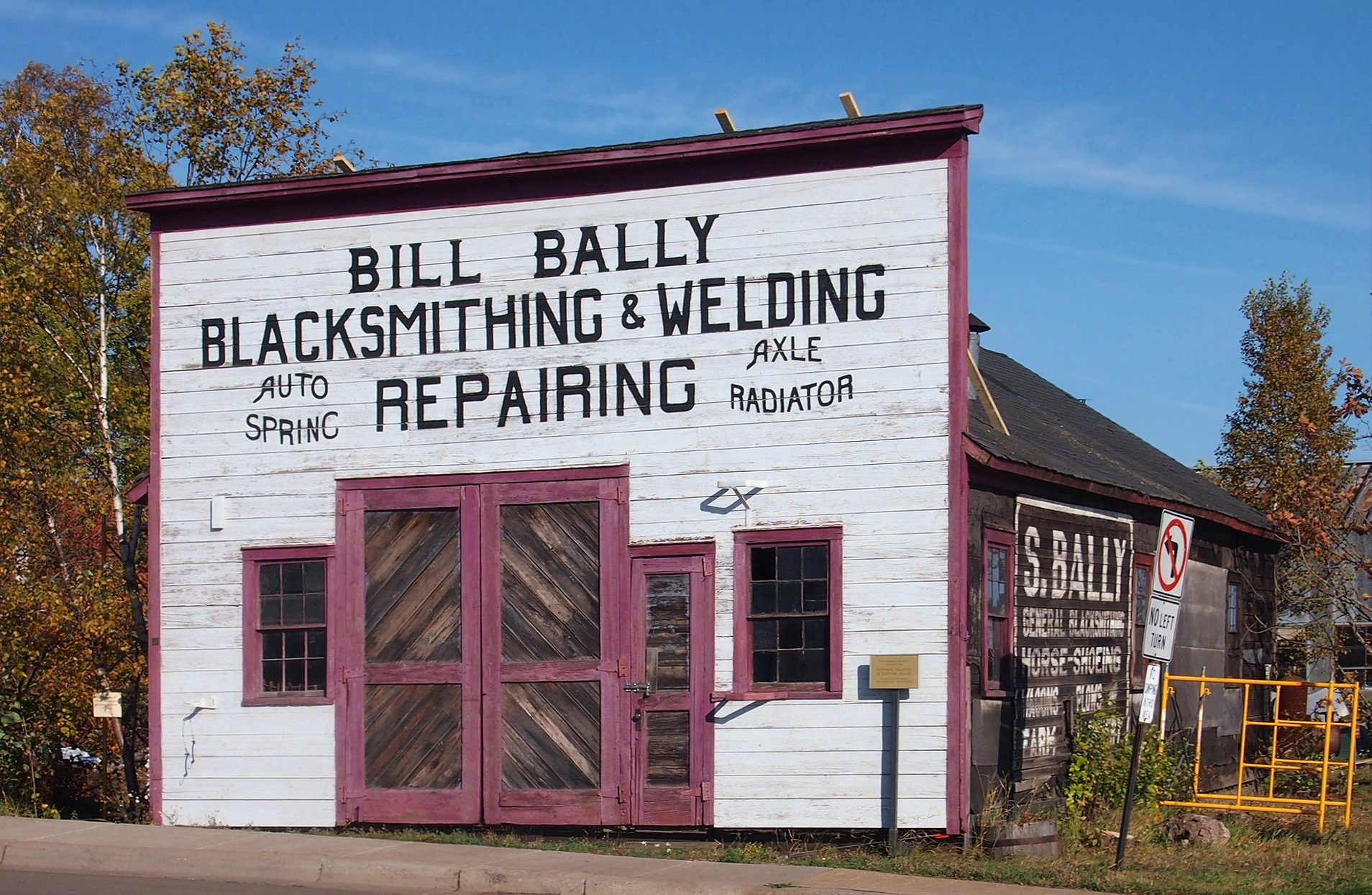

- Location within Minnesota Location within the United States
- Location: Broadway and First Streets, Grand Marais, Minnesota
- Coordinates: 47.750712°N 90.332894°W
- Area: .25 acres (0.10 ha)
- Built: 1911
- NRHP reference No.: 86001548
- Designated: October 13, 1986

The Bally Blacksmith Shop is a historic building in Grand Marais, Minnesota, United States, built in 1911 and used for nearly a century by three generations of the Bally family blacksmiths. The shop was listed on the National Register of Historic Places in 1986. It was nominated for being "architecturally and historically significant as a rare, intact, operating example of an early twentieth-century blacksmith shop", according to historical consultant Jeffrey Hess.

== Description ==
The Bally Blacksmith Shop stands in downtown Grand Marais. Hess' report to the NRHP describes the shop as "a wood-framed, wood-sided, one-story, gable-roofed structure measuring approximately 23 feet by 46 feet." It has not been significantly altered since its construction in 1911, with the exception of replacing the original wooden foundation with concrete in 1971, and a brick chimney in place of the original metal stovepipe at an unknown date.

It is a noteworthy example of the utilitarian, commercial, false-front architecture which was once common in small-town Minnesota. It also features an unusually well-preserved interior plan and fixtures of an early 20th-century blacksmith shop.

== History ==
According to the Cook County Historical Society, the shop "has chronicled Cook County’s economic history since the early 1900s - progressing from horse-drawn lumber camp equipment to motorized commercial fishing rigs to tourist automobiles and snowmobiles."

Founder Sam Bally relocated from Bayfield, Wisconsin, where he owned an earlier blacksmith shop, to Grand Marais in 1903. He was first employed as a blacksmith with the Cook County Manufacturing Company, which established the first sawmill in the town. He went into business for himself in 1911, building the blacksmith shop on Broadway in its current location. He was an important member of the community, regarded as the unofficial "village president", and was Cook County commissioner in 1914. Sam died in 1922, and the shop was taken over by his son William, whose name is on the front of the building, and passed it on to his brother Albert when he moved to Lutsen to start a well-drilling business in 1929. Albert was a veteran of World War I and graduated at the top of his class from the Milwaukee School of Engineering. He was an electrical engineer in Chicago before moving home to take over the family business. Albert ran the shop for many years, working alongside his son William, who took over in 1946. Billy Bally was a Korean War veteran and attended the University of Minnesota Duluth and Dunwoody College of Technology. They kept up with changing technology thanks to Albert's skills as an electrical engineer and Bill's as a trained machinist. The shop was in active use until the 1990s and closed in 2010 when the last Bally blacksmith, Bill Bally, died.

The metal Forest Service building behind the shop was added to the site in the 1960s after having been in service in Grand Portage until 1958. In 1973, the Cook County Historical Society planted three chestnut trees on the property, in honor of the Henry Wadsworth Longfellow poem "The Village Blacksmith."

The shop is now maintained by the Cook County Historical Society, which acquired the building in 2013. The society hosts blacksmithing demonstrations at the shop several times a year.

== Gallery ==
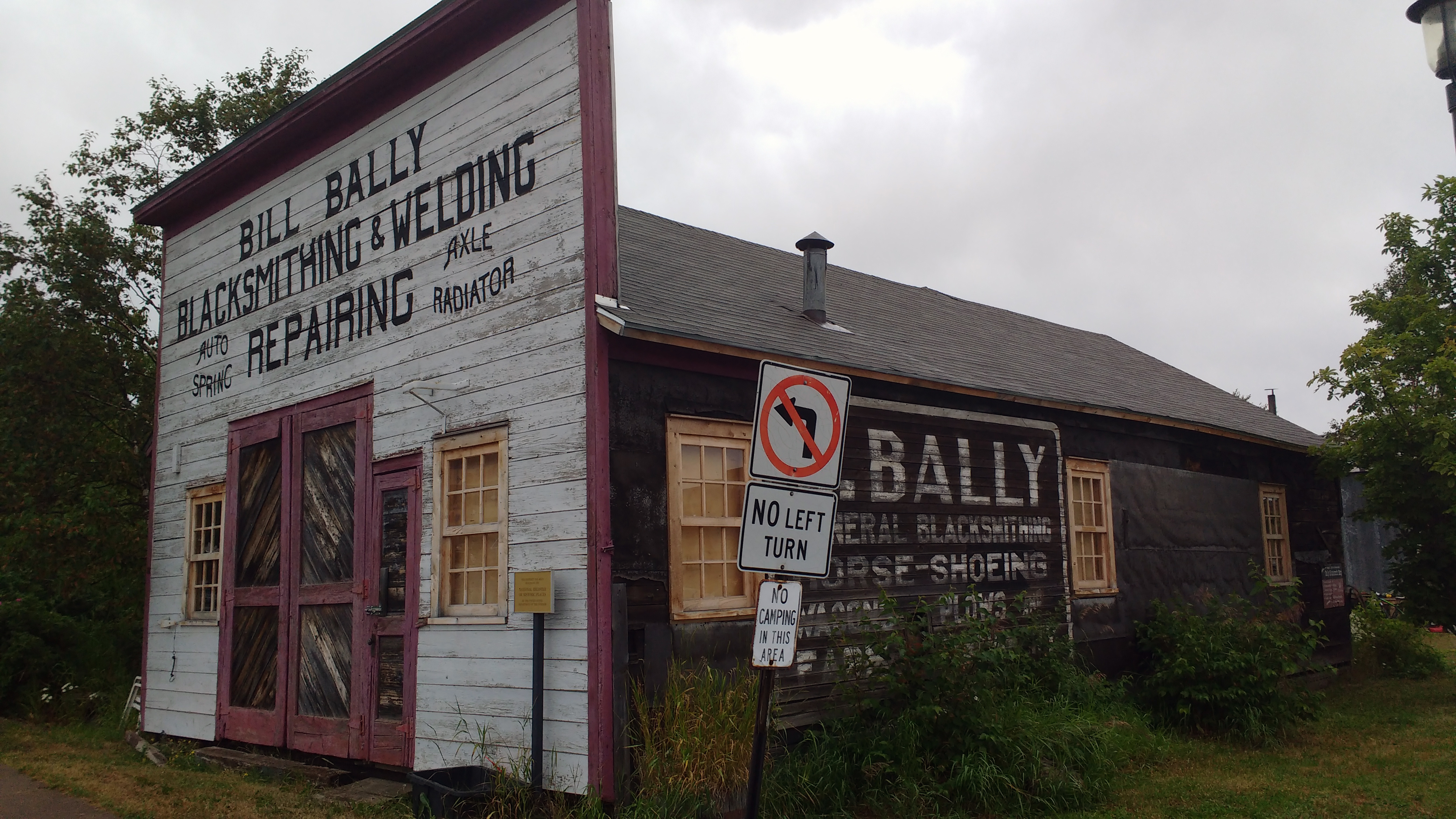

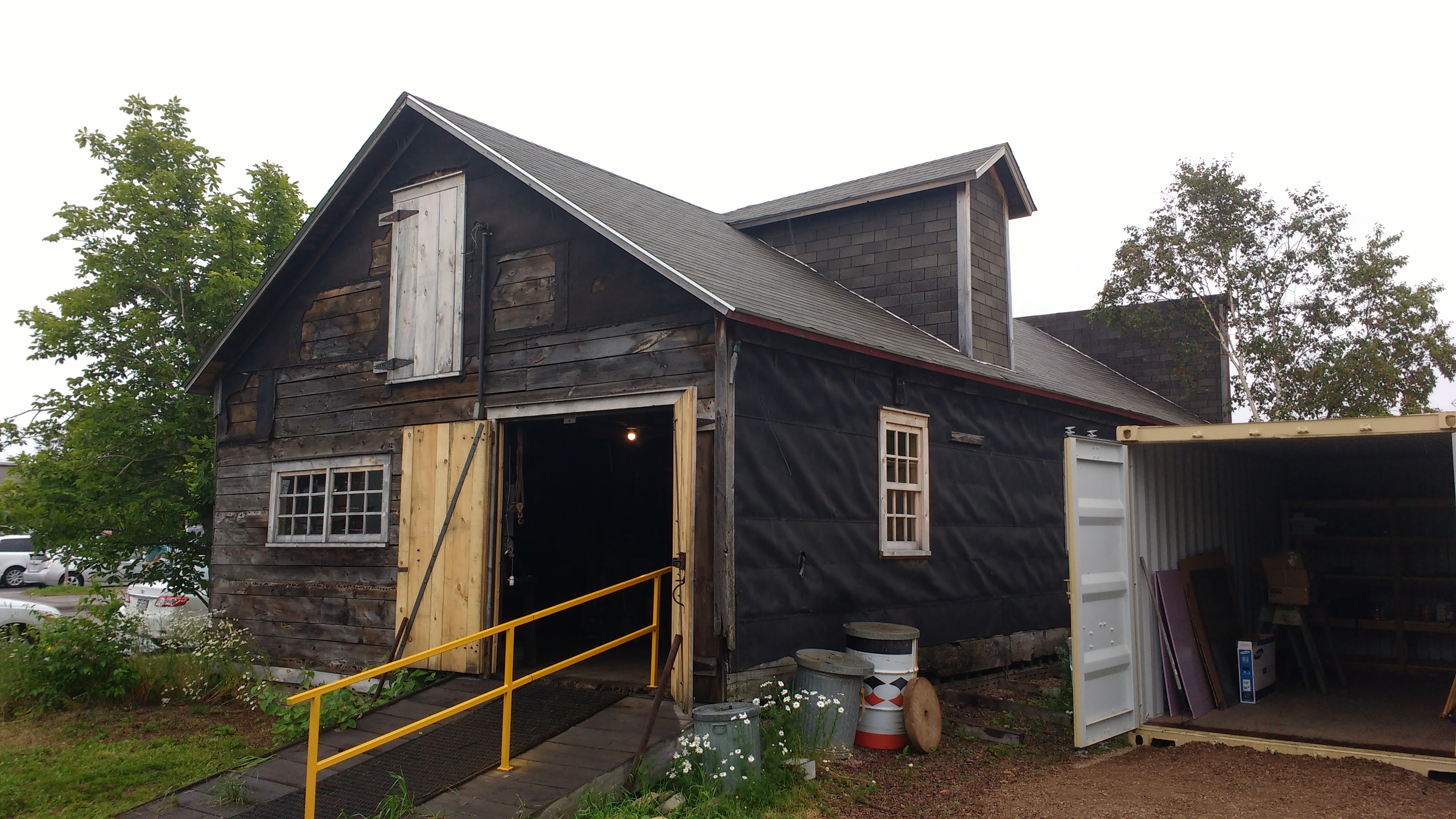

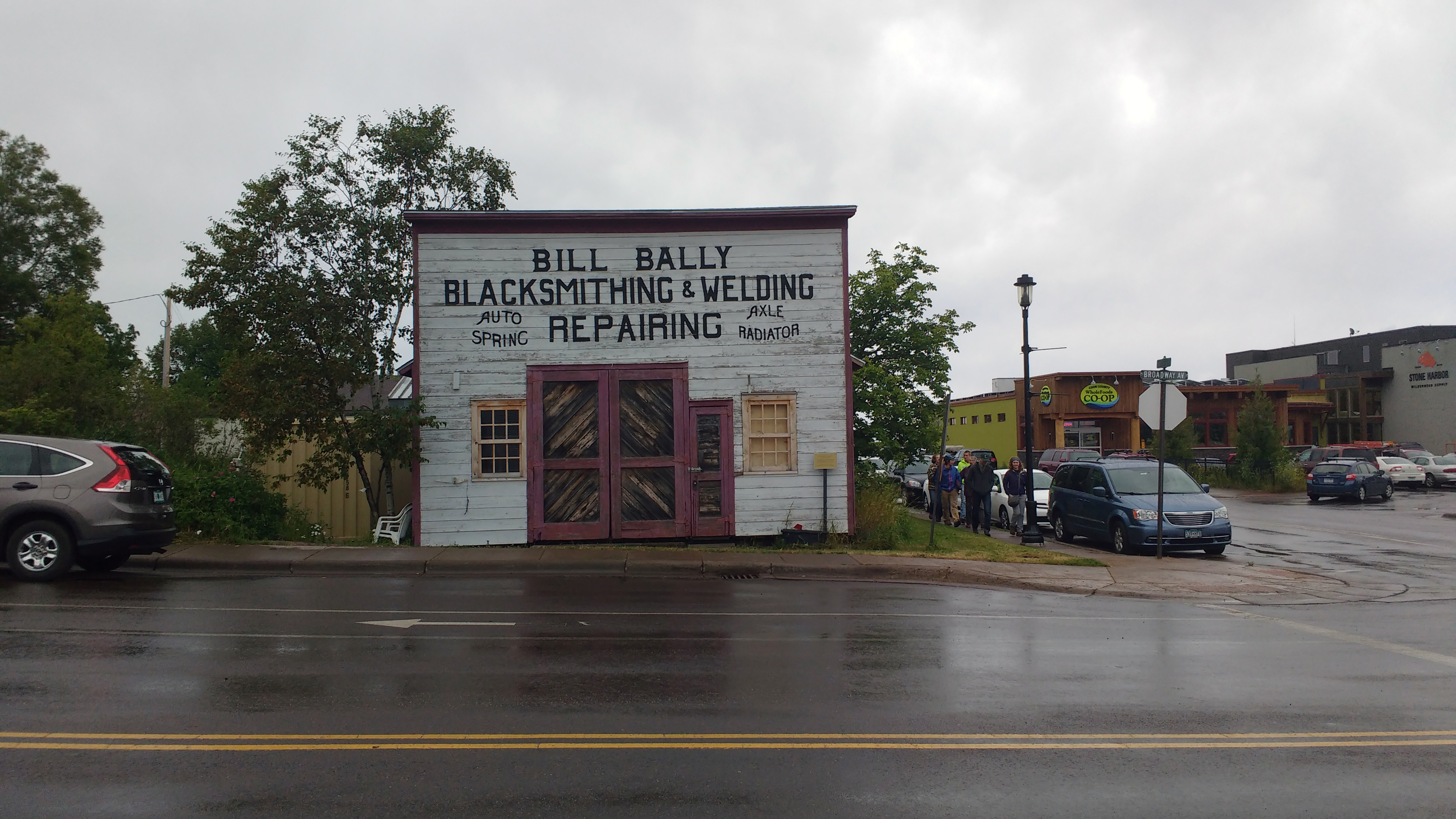

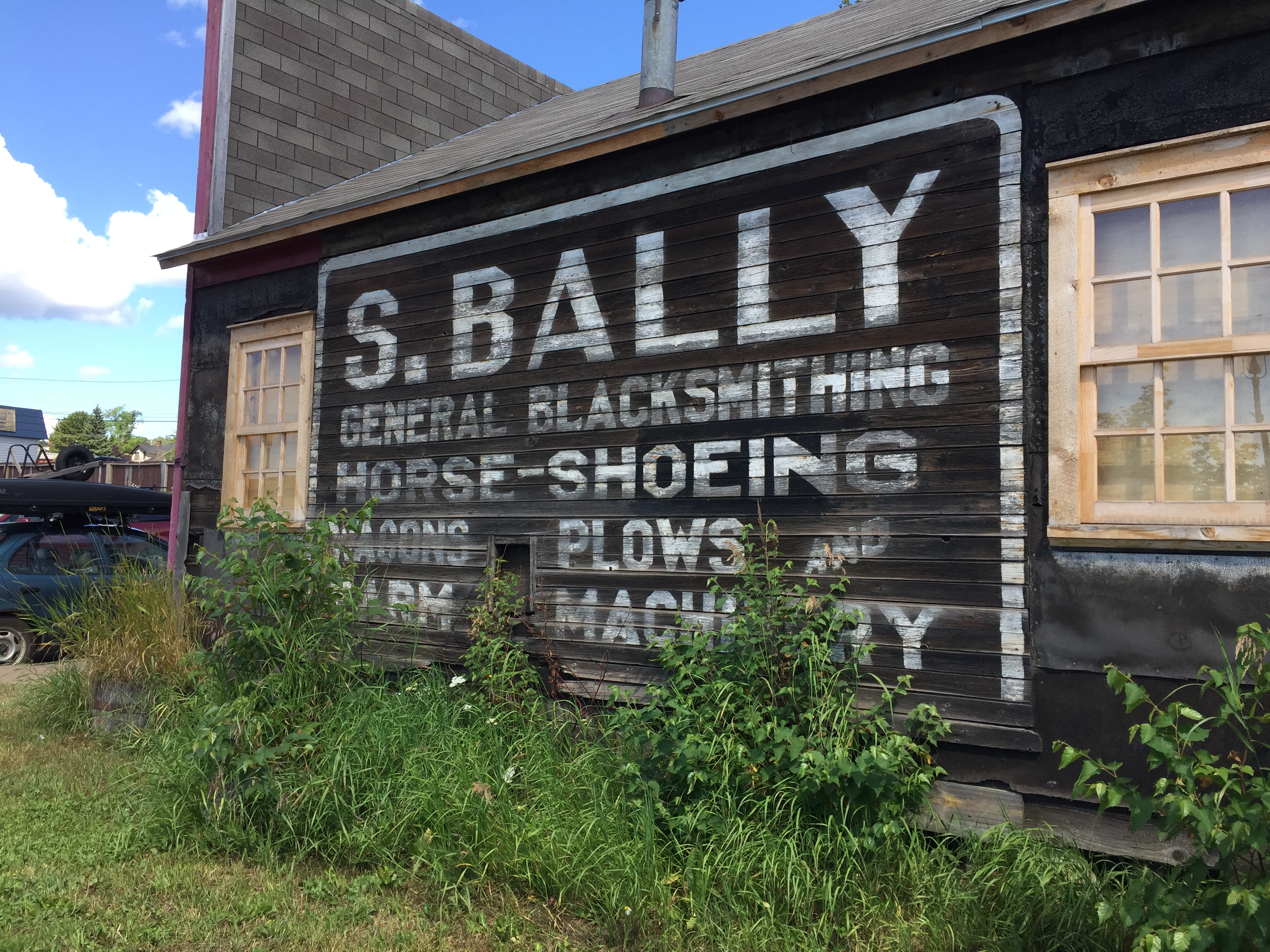

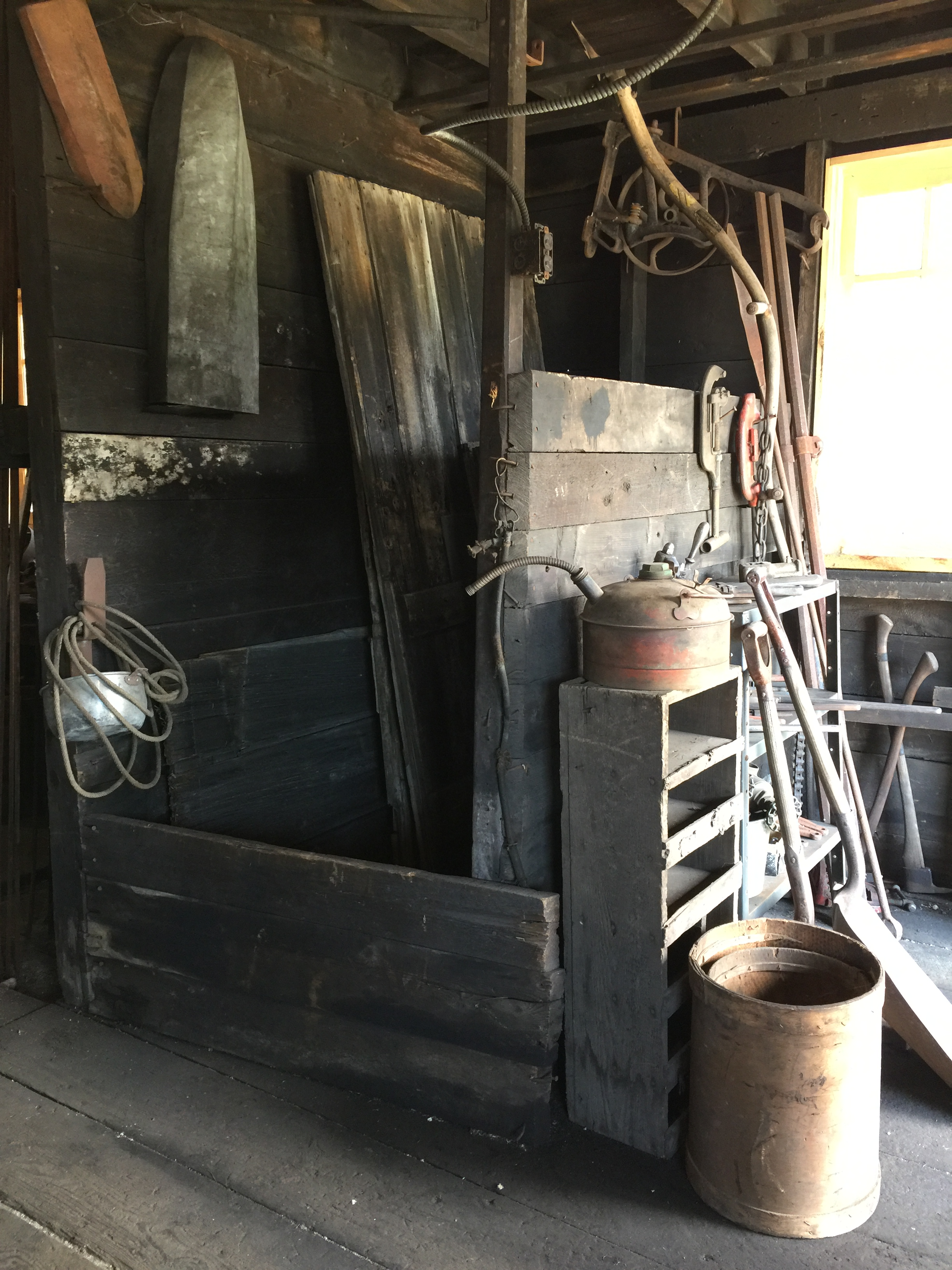
Coal bin

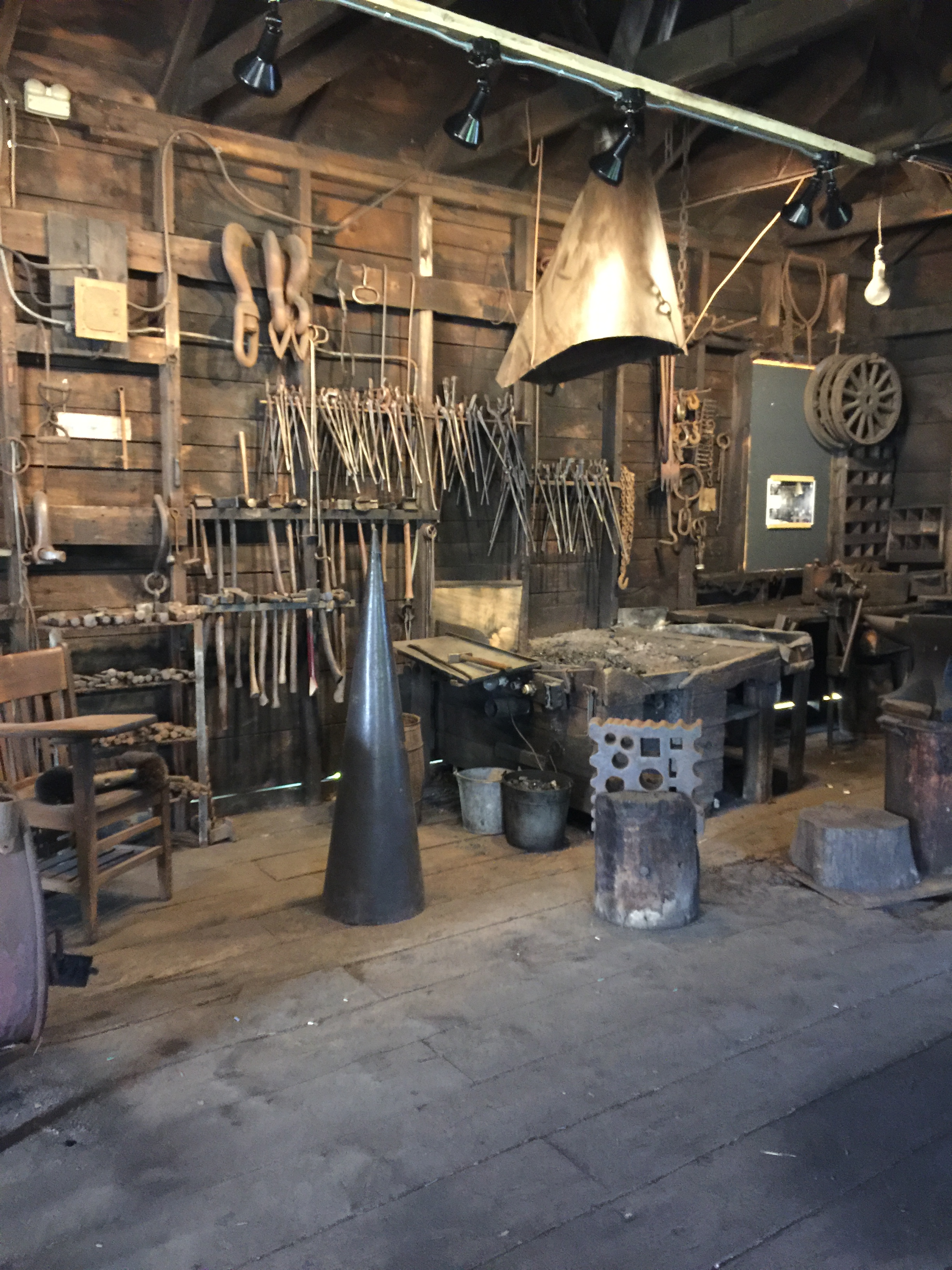
Forge

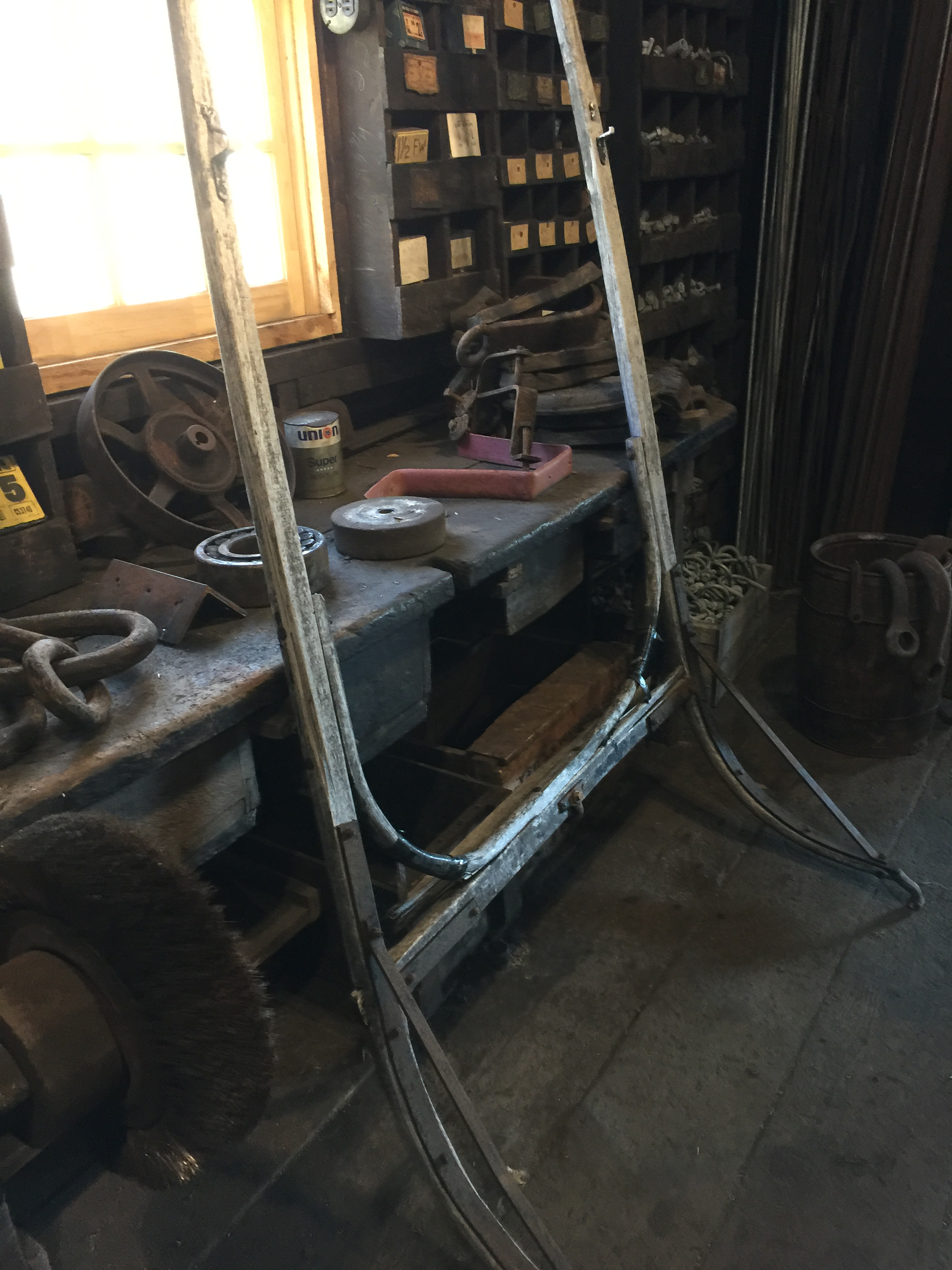
Harness and tools

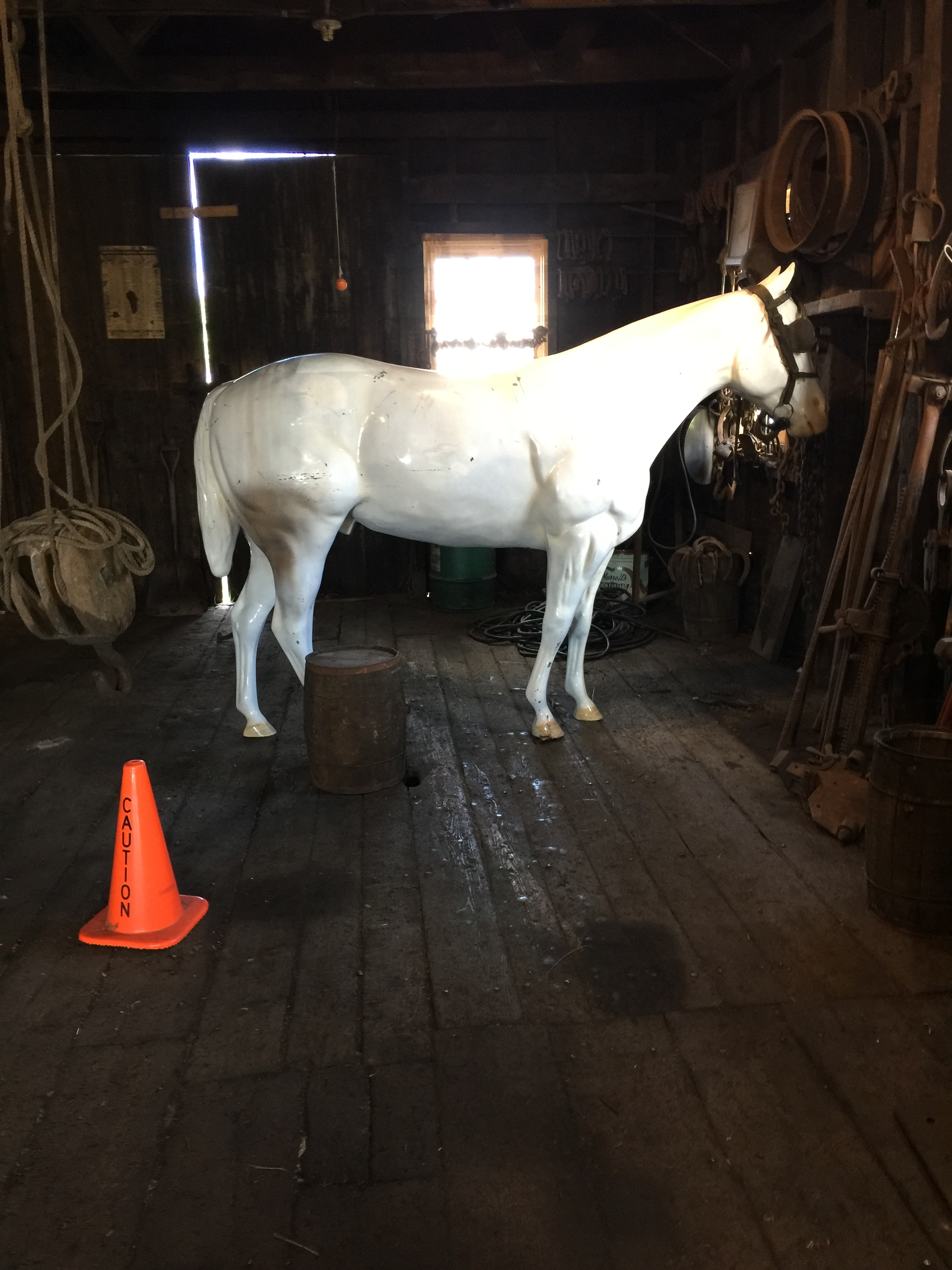
Horseshoe station

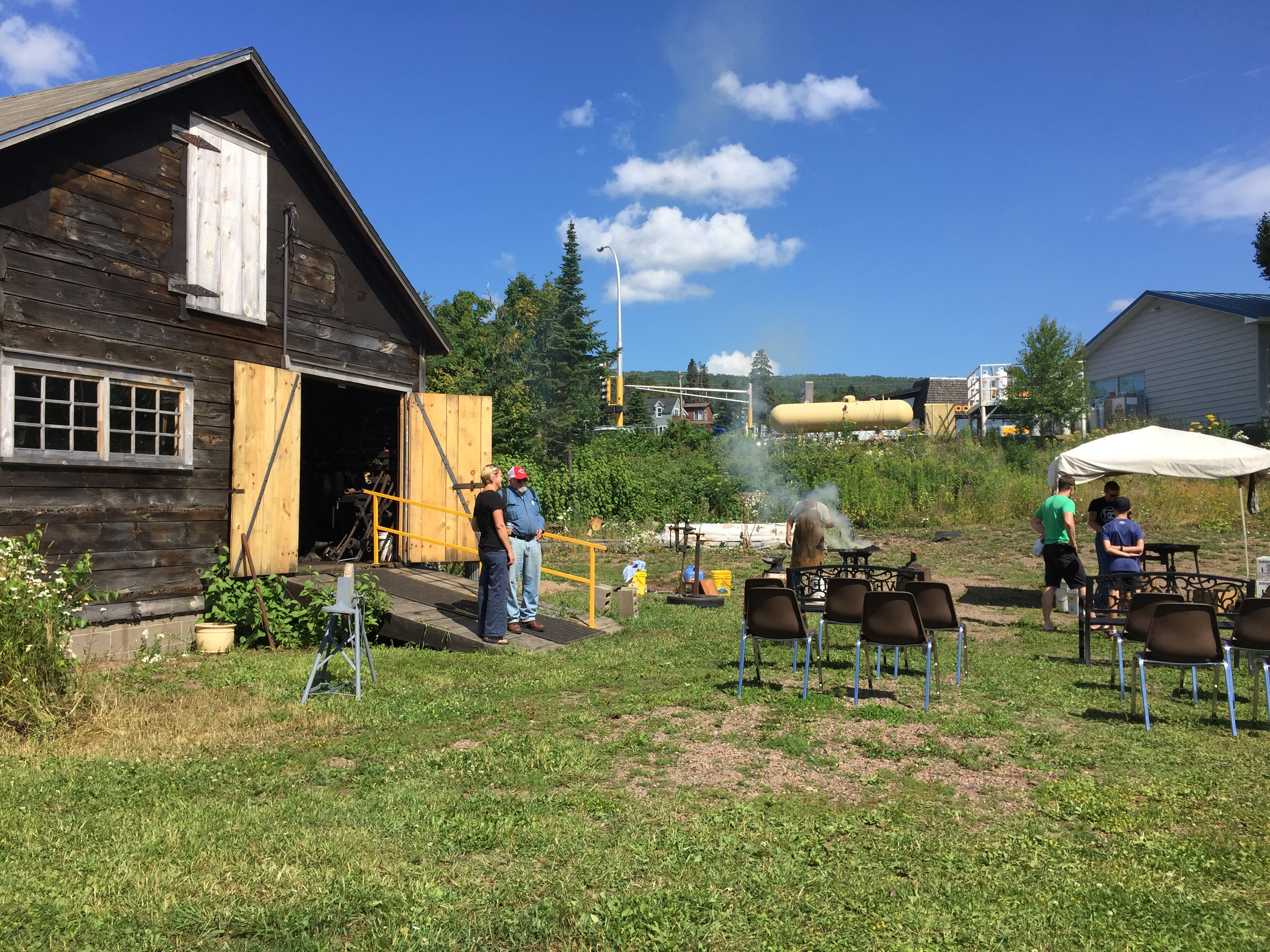
Rear yard

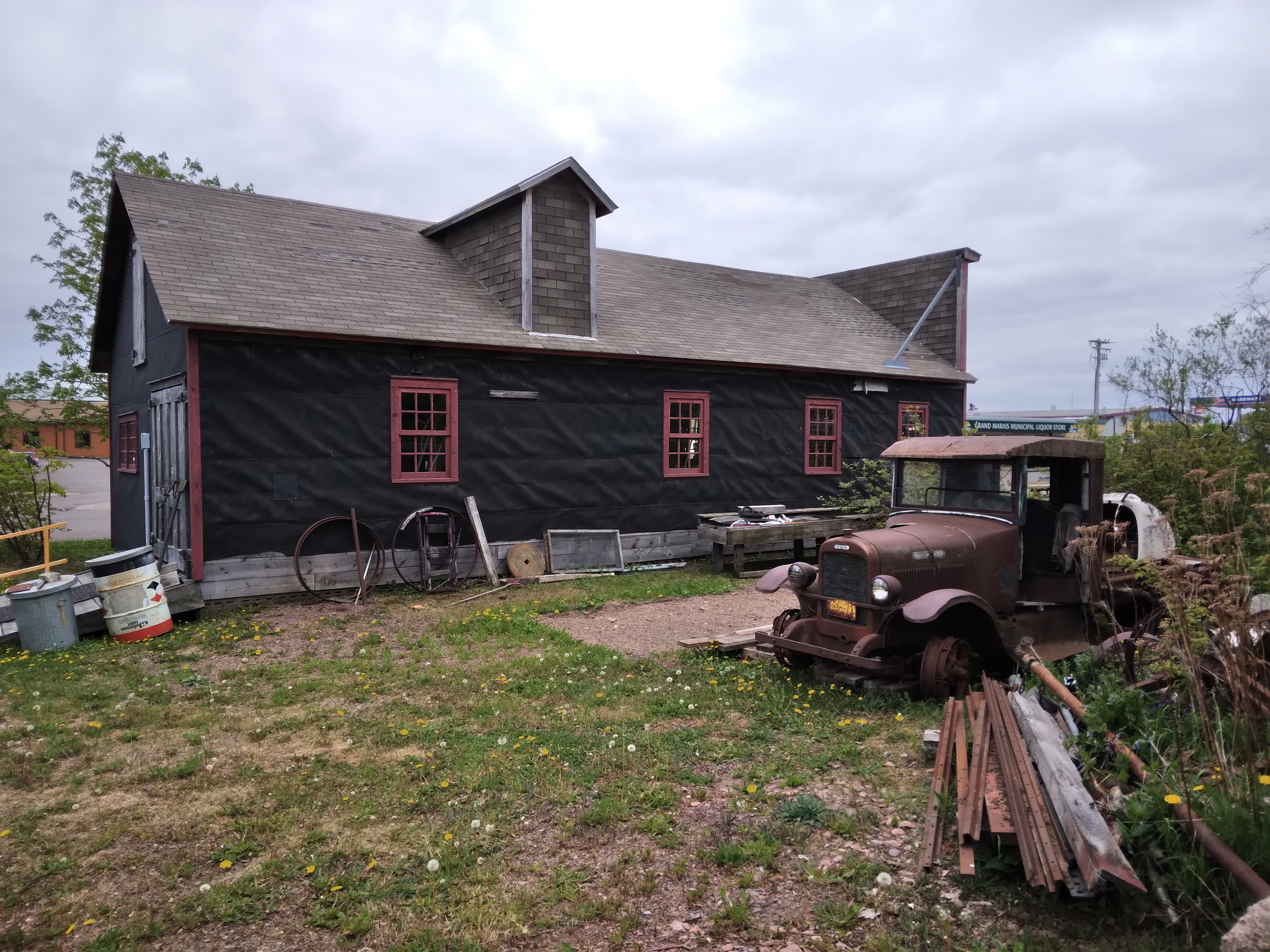

== See also ==
- National Register of Historic Places listings in Cook County, Minnesota
