= Cook County History Museum =

- Lightkeeper's House
- U.S. National Register of Historic Places
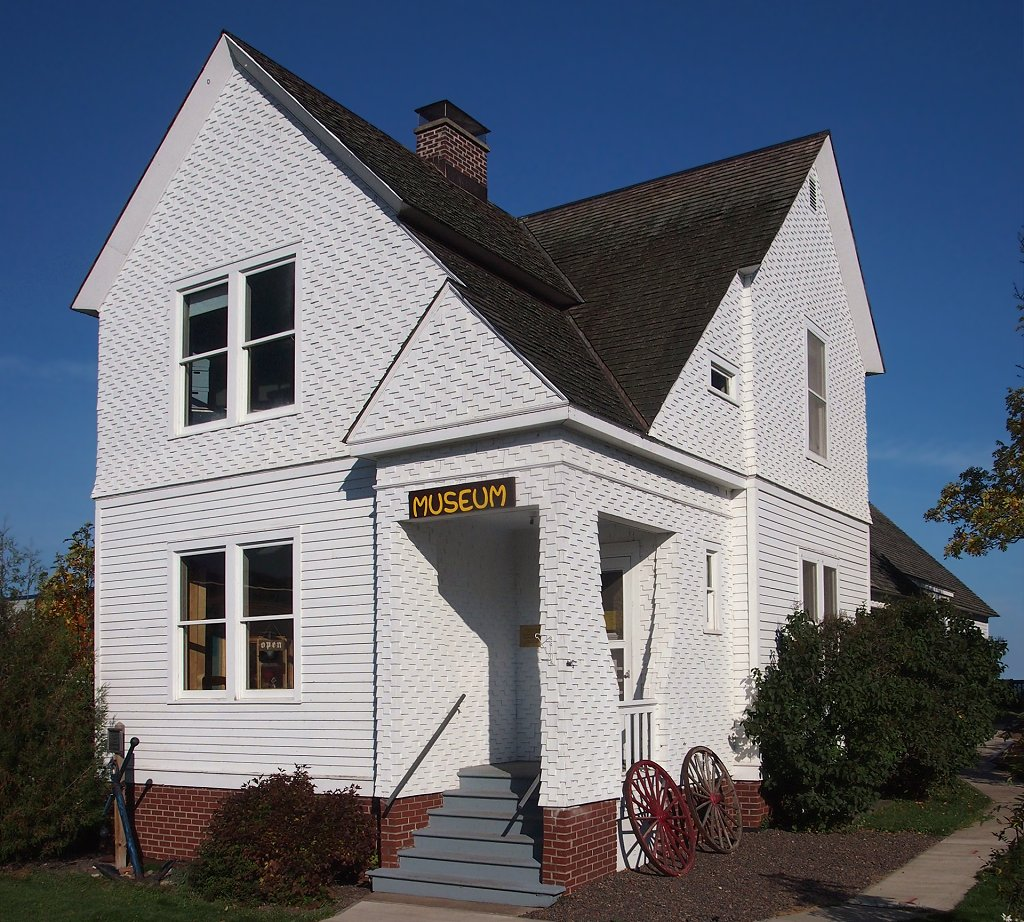

- Location within Minnesota Location within the United States
- Location: 12 South Broadway, Grand Marais, Minnesota
- Coordinates: 47.74902°N 90.33272°W
- Area: .25 acres (0.10 ha)
- Built: 1896
- NRHP reference No.: 78001528
- Designated: November 28, 1978

The Lightkeeper's House, also known as the Cook County History Museum, is a historic building in Grand Marais, Minnesota, United States.

It was listed on the National Register of Historic Places in 1978, and was nominated for being "a significant survivor of the settlement along Minnesota's north shore during the last decades of the nineteenth century. Furthermore, it is indicative of the dependence of communities such as Grand Marais on Lake Superior."

== Description ==
Constructed in 1896, the Lightkeeper's House is a well-preserved two-story frame residence of the kind called a "mechanics cottage". In his NHRP review, Charles Nelson called it "unimposing architecturally" and its ornamentation "undistinguished and sparse".

== History ==
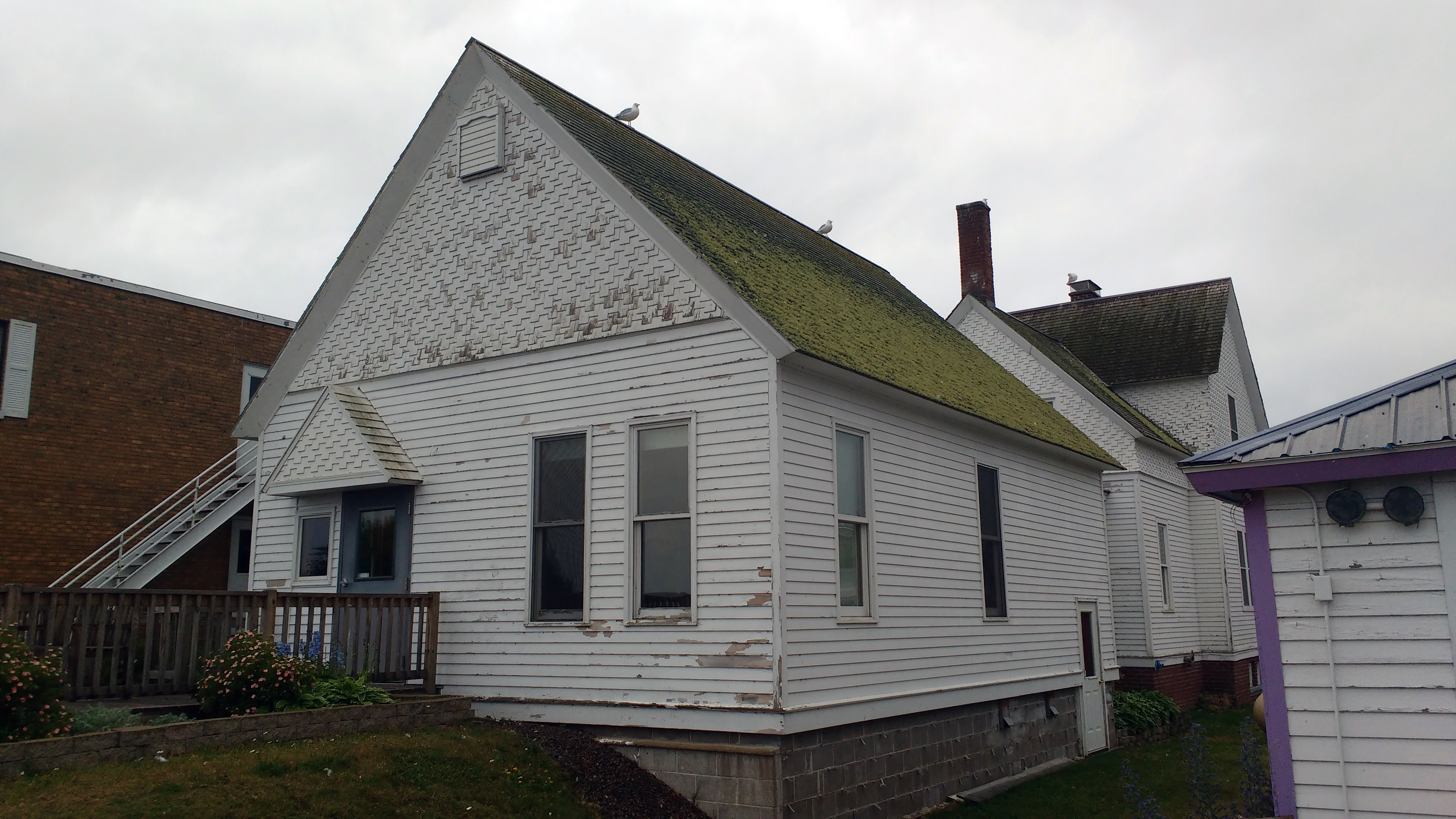
The back of the museum

The Lightkeeper's House, which is located a block from the shoreline near the Grand Marais lighthouse, was built in 1896 by the federal government to house the lighthouse keeper and his family. The Grand Marais lighthouse is one of several which were established along the shoreline between Duluth and the Canadian border during the second half of the nineteenth century. The rugged location of the well-known Split Rock Lighthouse was chosen to mark dangerous reefs. The lighthouses in Two Harbors and Grand Marais, conversely, marked places of refuge. The first lighthouse in Grand Marais was built in 1884, but the current building dates to 1896.

After 1946, it was used as a home for the U.S. Coast Guard commander. It was acquired by the Cook County Historical Society in 1966. In 2006, the society built an addition for use as an archival storage facility.

The building now houses the Cook County History Museum, which holds more than 50,000 artifacts, photos and documents including the Fresnel lens from the Grand Marais Lighthouse, and features exhibits on local history including fishing and maritime shipping, military history, the settlement of Lake Superior region, and the Civilian Conservation Corps. The building is also the society's main office.

== See also ==
- National Register of Historic Places listings in Cook County, Minnesota
