= Grand Marais Light =

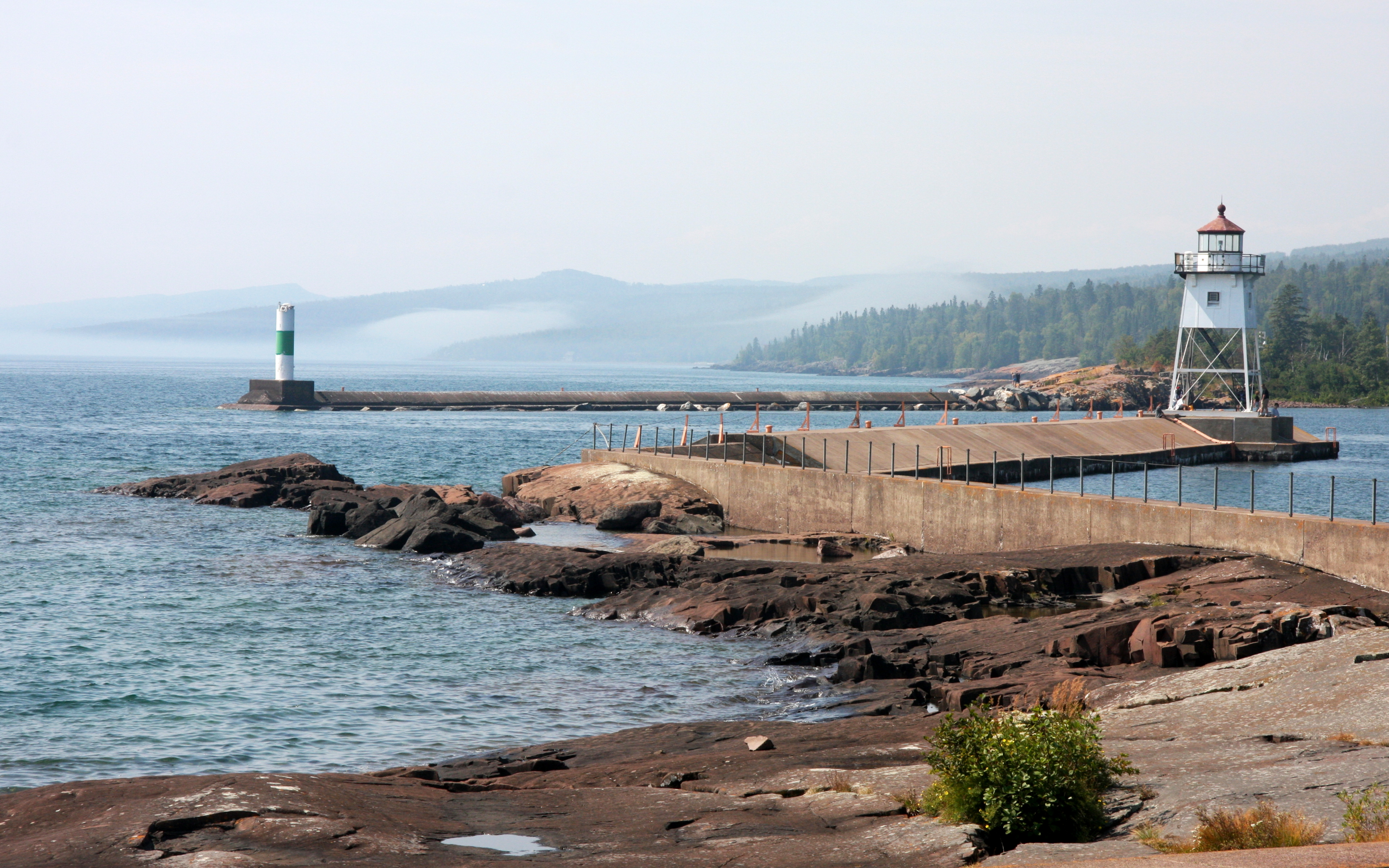
- Grand Marais Light in 2013
- Location: Grand Marais, Minnesota, USA
- Coordinates: 47.7451°N 90.3382°W

Tower
- Constructed: 1922
- Construction: Steel
- Height: 34 feet (10 m)
- Shape: Skeletal
- Markings: White

Light
- First lit: 1922
- Focal height: 48 feet (15 m)
- Lens: Fifth Order Fresnel
- Characteristic: Fl W 2.5s

Grand Marais Light is located on the outer end of a breakwater on the shore of Lake Superior in the city of Grand Marais in Cook County, Minnesota, United States. It is located in USCG District 9.

The tower was first lit in 1922 and is still operational.

The original keeper's house on shore is now operated as the main museum of the Cook County Historical Society. The museum features exhibits on area history, industry and culture.

== See also ==
- Grand Marais, Minnesota
- List of lighthouses in the United States
