= Schroeder, Minnesota =

Unincorporated community in Minnesota, United States

- Unincorporated community
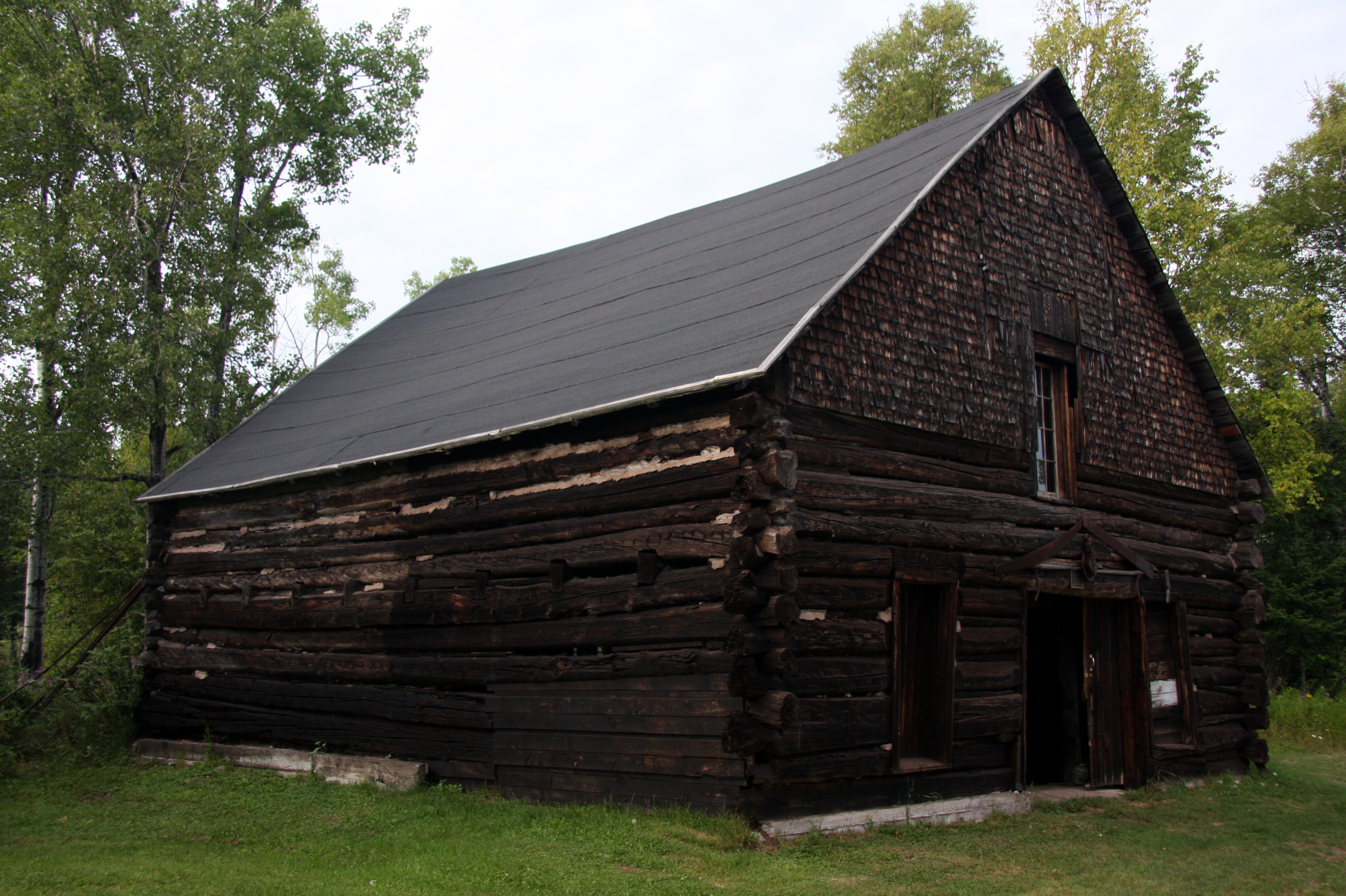
- The Schroeder Lumber Company Bunkhouse

- Location within Minnesota Location within the United States
- Coordinates: 47°32′40″N 90°53′31″W
- Country: United States
- State: Minnesota
- County: Cook
- Township: Schroeder
- Elevation: 640 ft (200 m)
- Time zone: UTC-6 (Central (CST))
  - Summer (DST): UTC-5 (CDT)
- ZIP codes: 55613
- Area code: 218
- GNIS feature ID: 658185

Schroeder is an unincorporated community in Schroeder Township, Cook County, Minnesota, United States.

The community is located on the North Shore of Lake Superior. The Cross River flows through the center, or middle of Schroeder.

Schroeder is located 30 miles (48 km) southwest of the city of Grand Marais; and 53 miles (85 km) northeast of the city of Two Harbors.

Minnesota Highway 61 serves as a main route in the community.

Temperance River State Park and the Superior Hiking Trail are both nearby.

== History ==
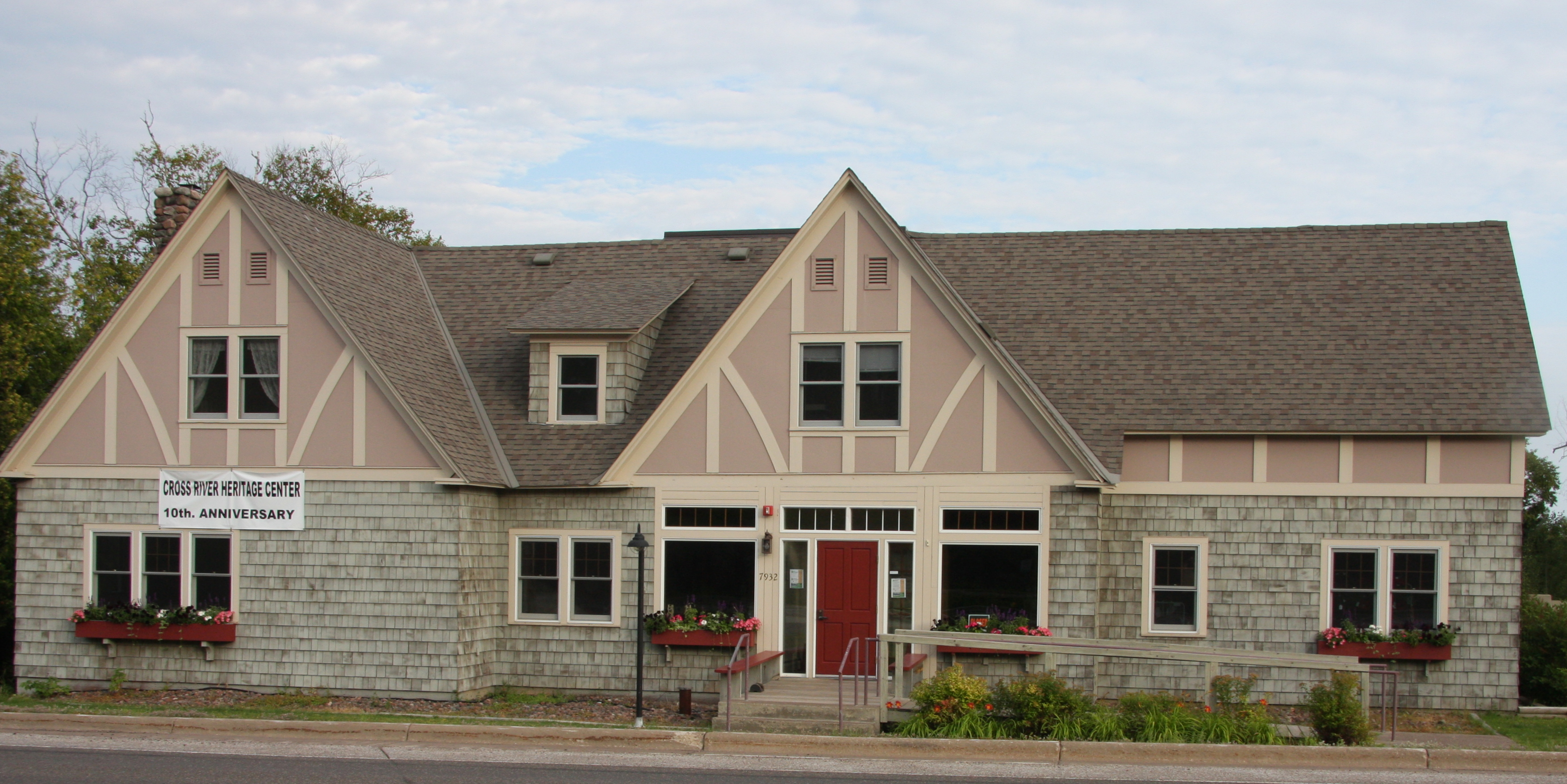
The Cross River Heritage Center in Schroeder

The community was named for John Schroeder, a lumber baron. The Schroeder Lumber Company Bunkhouse, listed on the National Register of Historic Places, stands near the town. It is the last remaining structure of a logging camp that existed from 1895 through 1905.

At the mouth of the Cross River is the place where Frederic Baraga safely washed ashore on a boat during a storm in 1846. In thanks he left a cross, now replaced by a granite one.

== Education ==
The entire county is served by Cook County Independent School District 166 (ISD 166).
