= Schroeder Lumber Company Bunkhouse =

- U.S. National Register of Historic Places
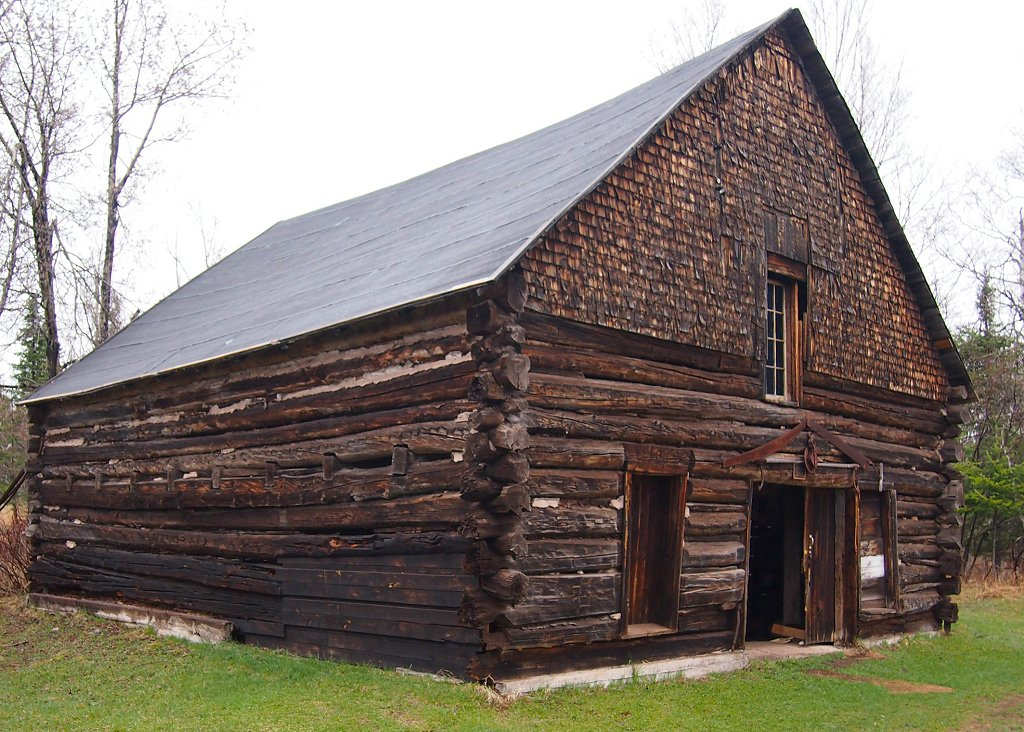
- The Schroeder Lumber Company Bunkhouse, now used for storage at Lamb's Resort

- Location within Minnesota Location within the United States
- Nearest city: Schroeder, Minnesota
- Coordinates: 47°32′35″N 90°53′41″W
- Area: 0.5 acres (0.20 ha)
- Built: 1900
- Built by: Schroeder Lumber Co.
- NRHP reference No.: 86002120
- Added to NRHP: July 31, 1986

The Schroeder Lumber Company Bunkhouse is the last remaining structure of a logging camp in Schroeder, Minnesota, United States, on the North Shore of Lake Superior. The Schroeder Lumber Company from Milwaukee, Wisconsin, established a camp there in 1895, on the Cross River. The loggers had plenty of white pine, balsam fir, and spruce trees to cut. Loggers also dynamited the top 20 feet (6.1 m) of the Cross River waterfall to widen the river and built a series of dams to hold water in reserve. This enabled the loggers to move the logs down the river and into Lake Superior, where they were collected into a "holding boom" that kept the logs from floating away. The camp operated until 1905, when crews left to log the Apostle Islands.

The camp had a reputation for good living conditions, fair wages, and good food. Lumberjacks ate a lot, and if the food wasn't to their liking, they would leave and seek employment with a different company. The sleeping accommodations were spartan, with rows of wooden bunk beds topped with mattresses stuffed with straw, hay, or evergreen boughs, along with pillows stuffed with grain and straw. Author Cathy Wurzer speculates that the smell in the bunkhouse was rather "ripe", given the smell of wet woolen clothes being hung up to dry and the housing of sweaty workers living in close quarters.

For a time, the Schroeder Lumber Company was one of the largest lumber retailers in the United States. The company owned and operated every step in the lumber supply chain, from cutting down trees to shipping the logs to milling and manufacturing wood products. Its owner, John Schroeder, had logging operations in Lake County and Cook County in Minnesota, as well as northern Wisconsin and the Upper Peninsula of Michigan. Owner John Schroeder died in 1905, and although his sons ran the firm for several decades afterward, the company went out of business in 1939 and the Milwaukee lumberyard was closed.
