= Grm, Velike Lašče =

Grm
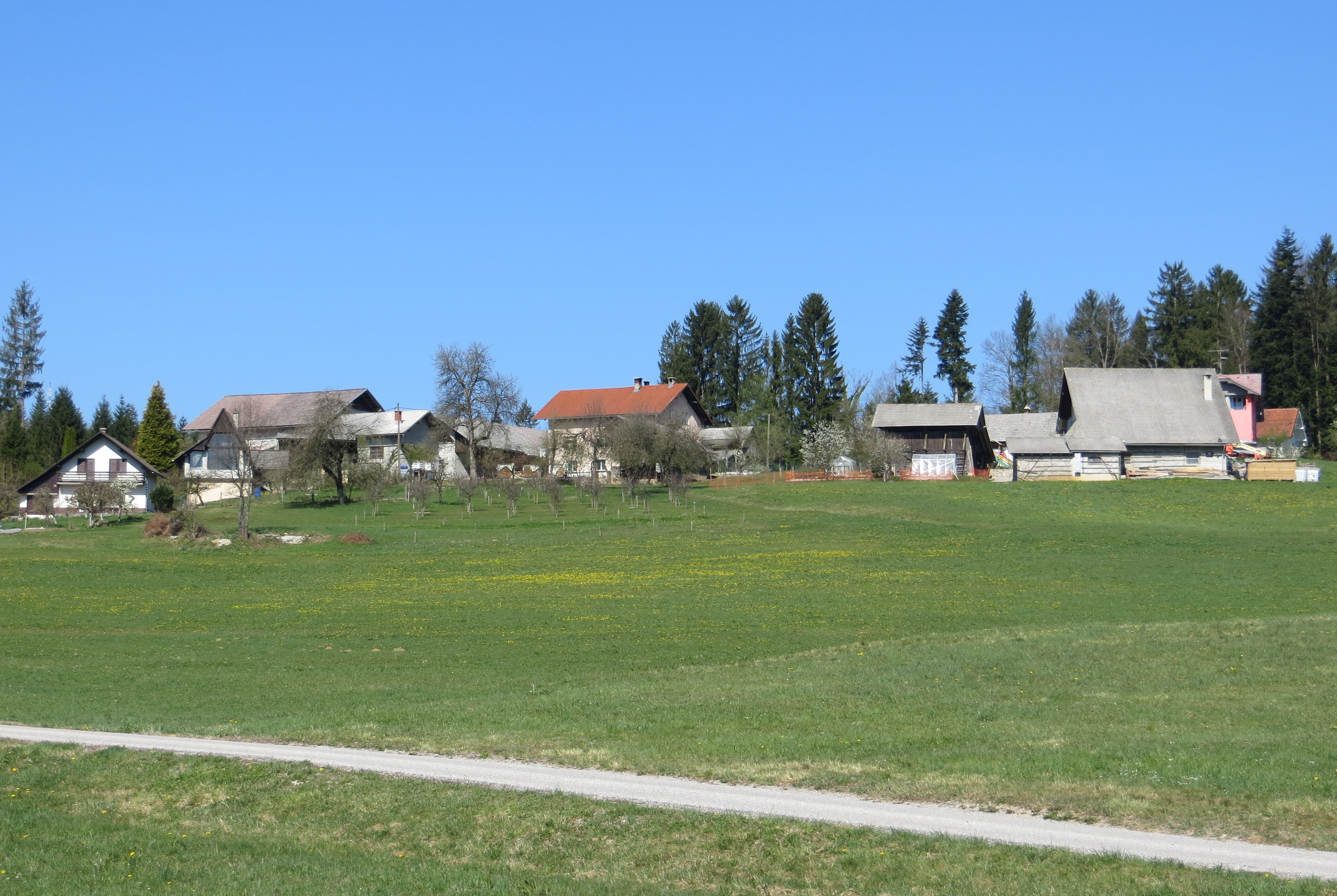

- Location in Slovenia
- Coordinates: 45°50′47.02″N 14°36′58.25″E
- Country: Slovenia
- Traditional region: Lower Carniola
- Statistical region: Central Slovenia
- Municipality: Velike Lašče

Area
  - Total: 0.17 km^{2} (0.066 sq mi)
- Elevation: 515.8 m (1,692 ft)

Population (2002)
  - Total: 11
- Postal code: 1315

Grm (pronounced [ˈɡəɾm]) is a small settlement south of Rašica in the traditional region of Lower Carniola in central Slovenia. It is part of the Municipality of Velike Lašče and is included in the Central Slovenia Statistical Region.
