= Grand Marais/Cook County Airport =

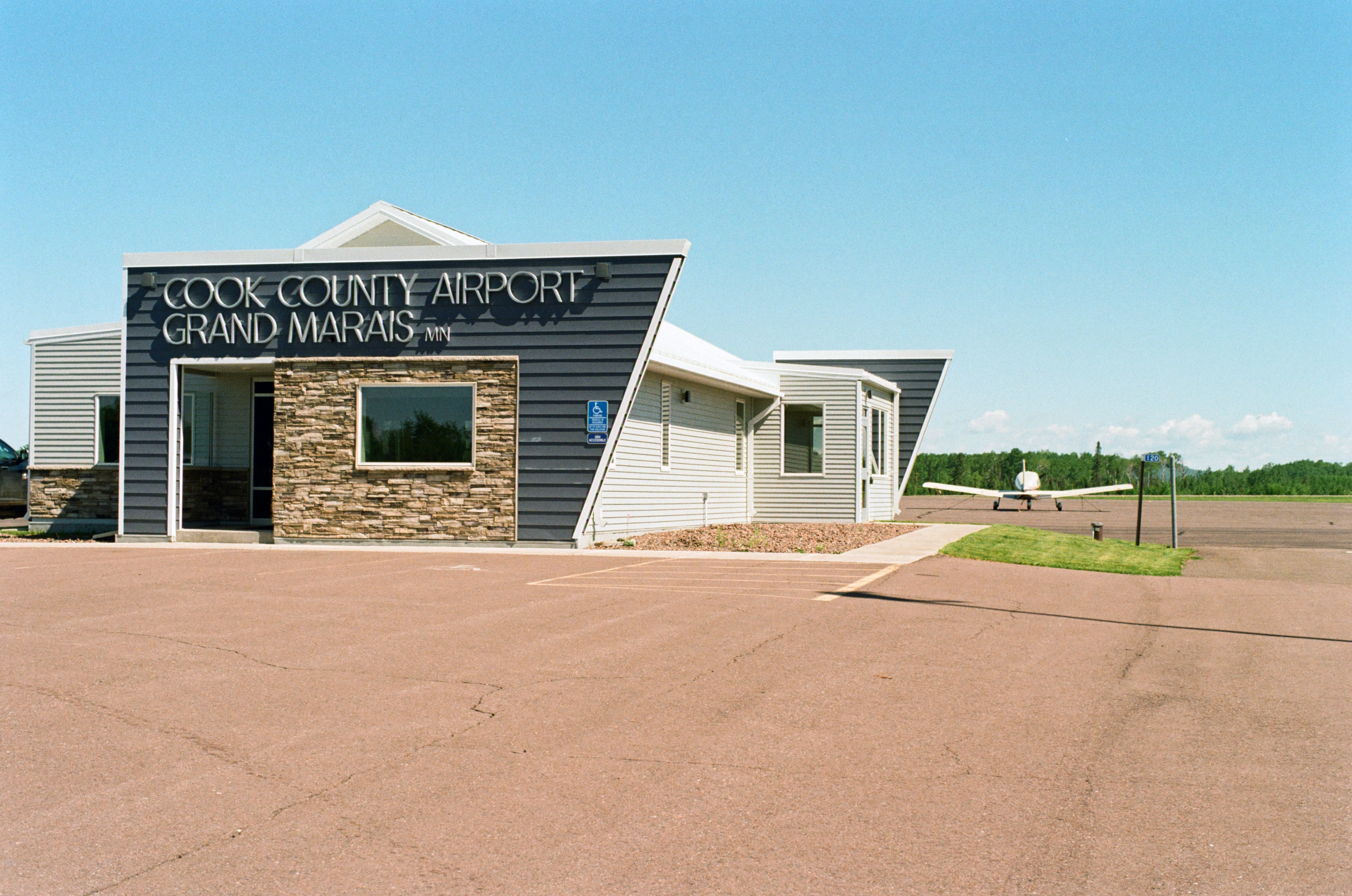
- IATA: GRM; ICAO: KCKC; FAA LID: CKC

Summary
- Airport type: Public
- Owner: Cook County
- Serves: Grand Marais, Minnesota
- Elevation AMSL: 1,799 ft (548 m)
- Coordinates: 47°50′18″N 090°22′59″W
- Website: www.boreal.org/airport

Map
- Location of airport in Minnesota/United States CKC (the United States)

Runways
Direction	Length		Surface
Direction	ft	m	Surface
9/27	5,000	1,524	Asphalt

Statistics (2005)
- Aircraft operations: 3,200
- Source: Federal Aviation Administration

Grand Marais/Cook County Airport (IATA: GRM, ICAO: KCKC, FAA LID: CKC) is a county-owned public-use airport located eight miles (13 km) northwest of the central business district of Grand Marais, a city in Cook County, Minnesota, United States.

The Grand Marais/Cook County Airport began as a fly-in wilderness resort created by a WWII bomber pilot who wanted to combine aviation and outdoor tourism in Northern Minnesota. WWII veteran Clarence J. Krotz bought land on Devil Track Lake in 1945 which was the location of the original airport. The new airport opened in 1996 and this airport replaced the former Devil's Track Municipal Airport (FAA: GRM) located on the shore of Devil's Track Lake, one mile (1.6 km) south of the current airport.

Although most U.S. airports use the same three-letter location identifier for the FAA and IATA, Grand Marais/Cook County Airport is assigned CKC by the FAA and GRM by the IATA (which assigned CKC to Cherkasy, Ukraine).

== Facilities and aircraft ==
Grand Marais/Cook County Airport covers an area of 220 acres (89 ha) at an elevation of 1,799 feet (548 m) above mean sea level. It has one runway designated 9/27 with a 4,199 ft × 75 ft (1,280 m × 23 m) asphalt surface.

For the 12-month period ending July 31, 2005, the airport had 3,200 general aviation aircraft operations, an average of 267 per month.

In the summer of 2009, the airport received $95,000 for the FAA to conduct an environmental impact study on a proposed expansion to the airport. On May 26, 2009, airport manager Rodney Roy told a Cook County board meeting that the expansion—which would widen the existing runway and increase its length to 5,000 feet from the existing 4,200 feet—would allow firefighting planes to operate from the airport. Roy also said that the project would cost approximately $12 million and might be spread out over three years.

Construction on the runway expansion started in 2015 and concluded in 2019 with the opening of the 5,000 foot runway and new facility buildings

== See also ==
- Grand Marais/Cook County Seaplane Base
