= Grm (Zenica) =

Grm Грм
- Village
- Location within Bosnia and Herzegovina
- Coordinates: 44°12′5″N 17°52′8″E
- Country: Bosnia and Herzegovina
- Entity: Federation of Bosnia and Herzegovina
- Canton: Zenica-Doboj
- Municipality: Zenica

Area
  - Total: 0.94 sq mi (2.44 km^{2})

Population (2013)
  - Total: 750
  - Density: 800/sq mi (310/km^{2})
- Time zone: UTC+1 (CET)
  - Summer (DST): UTC+2 (CEST)

Grm (Cyrillic: Грм) is a village in the City of Zenica, Bosnia and Herzegovina.

== Demographics ==
According to the 2013 census, its population was 750.

Ethnicity in 2013
Ethnicity	Number	Percentage
Bosniaks	659	87.9%
Croats	77	10.3%
Serbs	6	0.8%
other/undeclared	8	1.1%
Total	750	100%
