= Cross River (Lake Superior) =

- Mouth of the Cross River
- Native name: Ina’oonaani-ziibi (Ojibwe)

Location
- Country: United States
- State: Minnesota
- County: Cook County, Lake County

Physical characteristics
- Source
  - location: Toohey Lake
  - coordinates: 47.7123986°N 90.9923616°W
- Mouth
  - location: Schroeder, Minnesota, Lake Superior
  - coordinates: 47.5429584°N 90.8918179°W
- Length: 20.4-mile-long (32.8 km)

The Cross River is a 20.4-mile-long (32.8 km) river in northern Minnesota, the United States. It is a direct tributary of Lake Superior.

Originally named Ina’oonaani-ziibi (Ojibwe) the river was the site of an incident in 1846 when the missionary priest Frederic Baraga landed here during a storm. He erected a wooden cross at the river's mouth as a memorial and the river became known as Cross River as a result.

== See also ==
- List of rivers of Minnesota
