= Grand Marais, Minnesota =

City in Minnesota, United States

- City
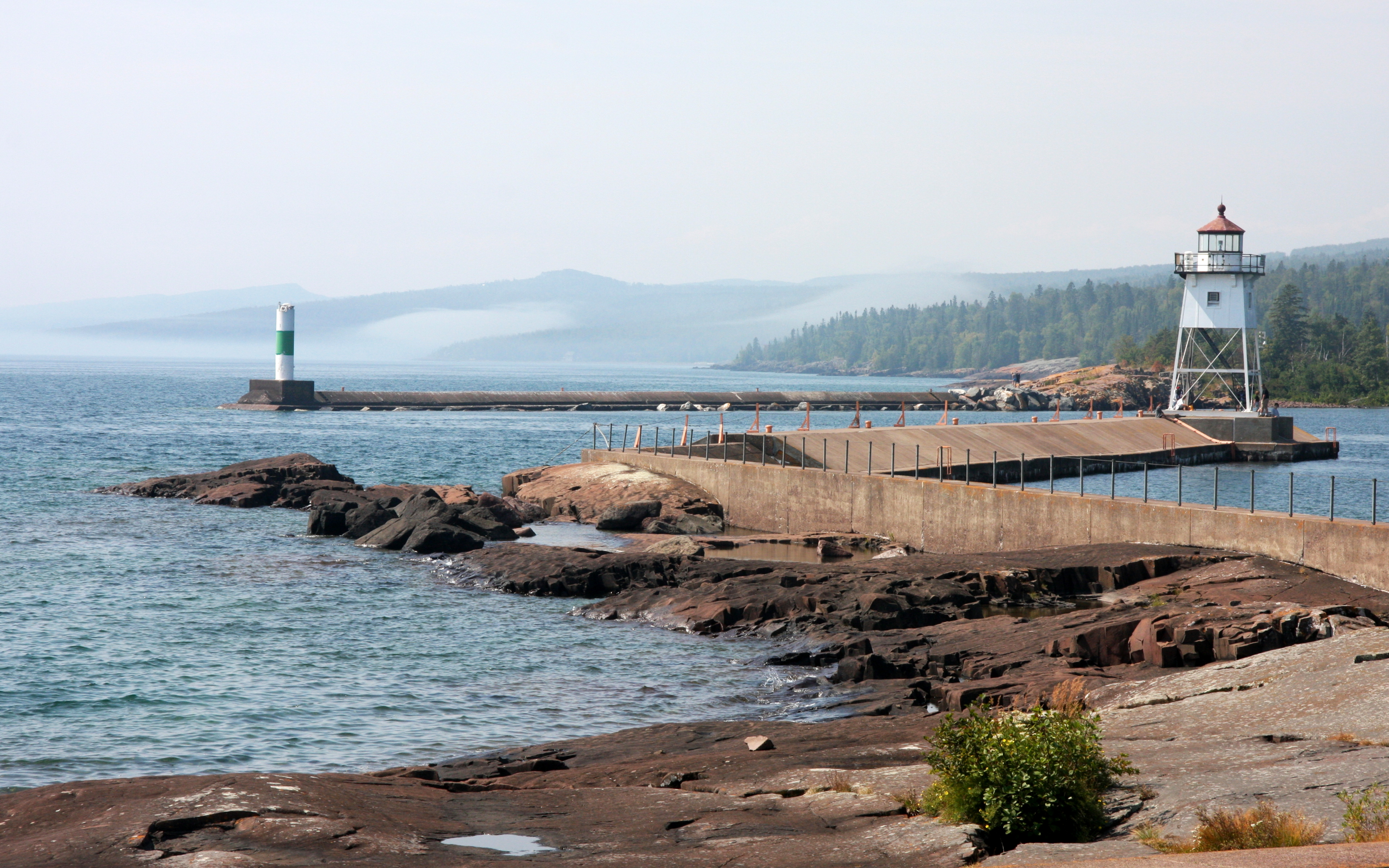
- Lake Superior harbor in downtown Grand Marais

- Logo

- Location of the city of Grand Marais within Cook County, Minnesota

- Location within the United States
- Coordinates: 47°45′01″N 90°20′04″W
- Country: United States
- State: Minnesota
- County: Cook

Area
  - Total: 2.91 sq mi (7.53 km^{2})
  - Land: 2.91 sq mi (7.53 km^{2})
  - Water: 0 sq mi (0.00 km^{2}) 0%
- Elevation: 617 ft (188 m)

Population (2020)
  - Total: 1,337
  - Estimate (2021): 1,340
  - Density: 459.6/sq mi (177.46/km^{2})
- Time zone: UTC-6 (CST)
  - Summer (DST): UTC-5 (CDT)
- ZIP code: 55604
- Area code: 218
- FIPS code: 27-24992
- GNIS feature ID: 0656425
- Website: ci.grand-marais.mn.us

Grand Marais (/məˈreɪ/ mə-RAY) is a city and the county seat of Cook County, Minnesota, United States, of which it is the only municipality. It is on Lake Superior's North Shore. Grand Marais had a population of 1,337 at the 2020 census. Before it was settled by French Canadians and before Minnesota's statehood, it was inhabited by the Ojibwe.

The Gunflint Trail, a National Scenic Byway, begins in Grand Marais and ends near the border with Ontario.

== History ==
The Ojibwe name for the area is Gichi-biitoobiig, which means "great duplicate water," "parallel body of water" or "double body of water" (like a bayou), a reference to the two bays that form this large harbor of Lake Superior.

The area was a bustling fur trading station in the 1700s, and the French Canadian Voyageurs termed the settled village "Grand Marais" ("Great Marsh"), referring to a marsh that, in early fur-trading times, was 20 acres (8.1 ha) or less in area, nearly at the level of Lake Superior, and at the head of the little bay and harbor that led to the settlement of the village there. Another small bay on the east, less protected from storms, is separated from the harbor by a slight projecting point and a short beach. "Grand Marais" also may mean "sheltered water area", as the harbor has natural breakwall rock outcroppings, providing a natural safe harbor for early Lake Superior explorers.

The area is home to several nonprofit educational institutions, such as the Grand Marais Art Colony and the North House Folk School, and art galleries featuring the work of local and regional artists.

On April 13, 2020, a large fire swept through downtown Grand Marais, destroying three buildings: The Crooked Spoon Cafe, White Pine North, and Picnic and Pine. The fire burned for over three hours in intense winds.

== Geography ==
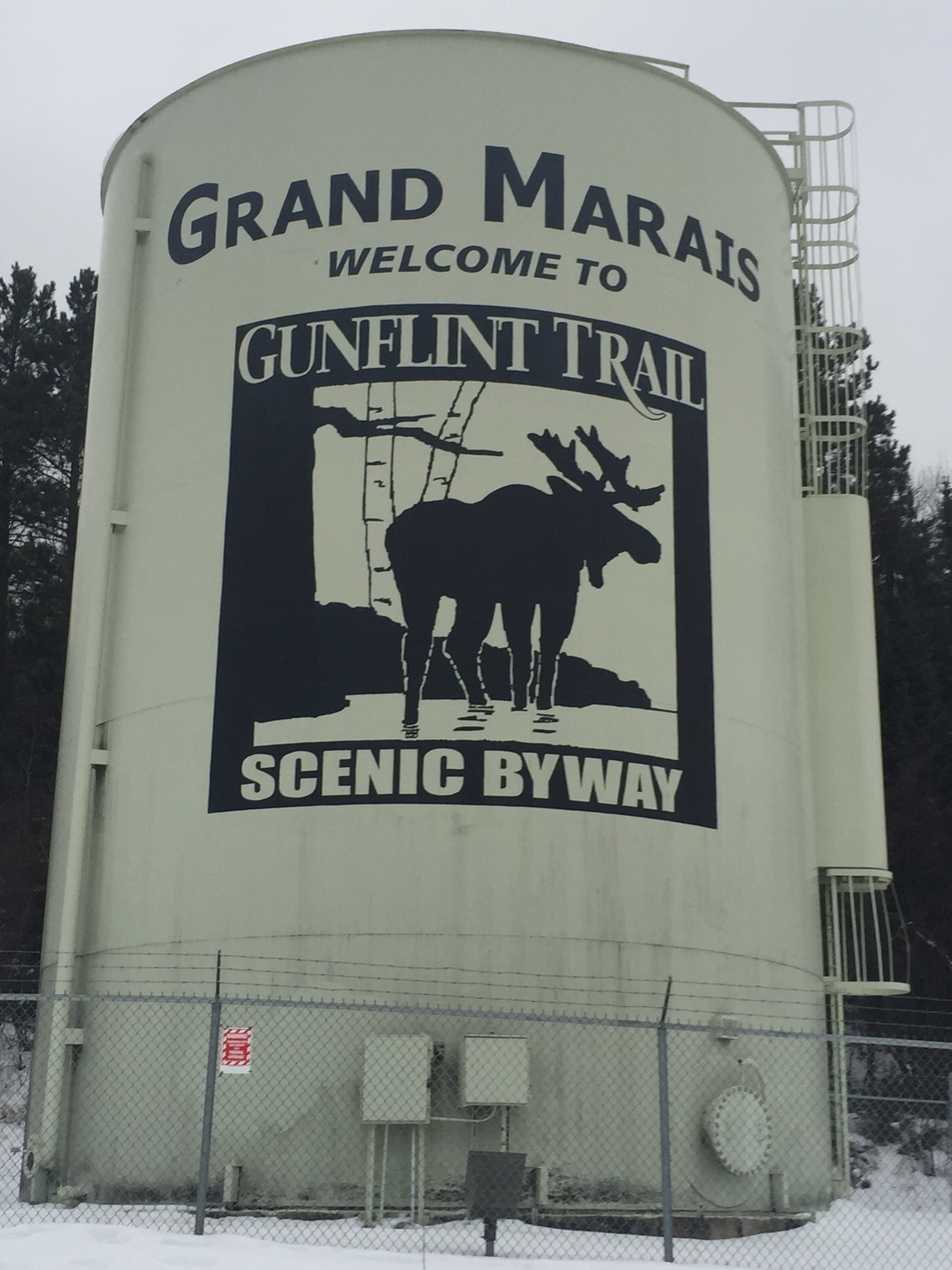
The start of the Gunflint Trail in Grand Marais

According to the United States Census Bureau, the city has an area of 2.90 square miles (7.51 km^{2}), all land. Grand Marais is on the northwestern shore of Lake Superior. It is an entry point for the Boundary Waters Canoe Area Wilderness, at the beginning of the Gunflint Trail. The Superior Hiking Trail passes near Grand Marais, and Judge C. R. Magney State Park is nearby.

The land surrounding Grand Marais slopes up to form the Sawtooth Bluff, a dramatic rock face visible from nearly any vantage point in the city. Adjacent to the bluff is Pincushion Mountain, a large bald monolith with views of Lake Superior and the inland wilderness.

Grand Marais Harbor is protected by Artist's Point, a barrier island formed by lava that was connected to the mainland by gravel deposited by lake currents, forming a tombolo. An Arctic–alpine disjunct community survives there.

Road access to Grand Marais is by Minnesota Highway 61, which follows the shore of Lake Superior, and is known as the North Shore Scenic Drive. The Gunflint Trail (Cook County Road 12) begins in Grand Marais and heads northwest, away from the lake and into the Boundary Waters region.

Grand Marais is 110 miles (180 km) northeast of Duluth and 38 miles (61 km) southwest of the Canada–US border.

=== Climate ===
Grand Marais has a warm-summer humid continental climate (Köppen Dfb), like the rest of northern Minnesota. Because of the moderating influence of Lake Superior, summer temperatures are cooler, winter temperatures warmer, and the seasonal temperature difference is smaller than locations farther inland. With average highs of just below 70 °F (21 °C) in July and August, Grand Marais has the coolest summer temperatures of any weather station in Minnesota. The difference between the temperature of the warmest and coldest months is only 47.6 °F (26.4 °C), significantly smaller than 58.9 °F (32.7 °C), the seasonal temperature difference in Tower, about 90 miles (140 km) to the west. Despite being significantly farther north, Grand Marais lies in USDA hardiness zone 4b like Duluth and Minneapolis, with an average yearly minimum temperature of −23 °F (−31 °C).

When winds come from the south, hot temperatures can sometimes hit Grand Marais in spite of the mild summer averages. The warmest temperature recorded is 100 °F (38 °C) in July 1930. The coldest temperature measured is −35 °F (−37 °C) from 1934. Cold daytime maximums are less frequent than in Minnesota's interior but can still be very cold on occasion. The coldest maximum recorded is −14 °F (−26 °C) in 2013 and during the 1991 to 2020 normals the mean for the coldest maximum was 0 °F (−18 °C). The warmest overnight lows in Grand Marais were three 75 °F (24 °C) readings during the summer of 1937, along with previous readings in 1919 and 1898. On average, the warmest low of the year is 64 °F (18 °C).

Climate data for Grand Marais, Minnesota (1991–2020 normals, extremes 1897–present)
Month	Jan	Feb	Mar	Apr	May	Jun	Jul	Aug	Sep	Oct	Nov	Dec	Year
Record high °F (°C)	52 (11)	58 (14)	67 (19)	83 (28)	88 (31)	93 (34)	99 (37)	100 (38)	90 (32)	77 (25)	67 (19)	69 (21)	100 (38)
Mean maximum °F (°C)	39.1 (3.9)	41.7 (5.4)	50.9 (10.5)	62.4 (16.9)	74.5 (23.6)	80.6 (27.0)	85.0 (29.4)	83.0 (28.3)	76.7 (24.8)	66.9 (19.4)	52.6 (11.4)	41.2 (5.1)	86.8 (30.4)
Mean daily maximum °F (°C)	21.4 (−5.9)	24.7 (−4.1)	33.3 (0.7)	43.5 (6.4)	53.4 (11.9)	61.2 (16.2)	69.2 (20.7)	69.5 (20.8)	61.9 (16.6)	49.7 (9.8)	36.6 (2.6)	26.3 (−3.2)	45.9 (7.7)
Daily mean °F (°C)	13.5 (−10.3)	16.2 (−8.8)	25.6 (−3.6)	36.1 (2.3)	45.4 (7.4)	52.6 (11.4)	60.4 (15.8)	61.8 (16.6)	54.6 (12.6)	43.0 (6.1)	30.5 (−0.8)	19.5 (−6.9)	38.3 (3.5)
Mean daily minimum °F (°C)	5.7 (−14.6)	7.7 (−13.5)	17.9 (−7.8)	28.7 (−1.8)	37.4 (3.0)	44.0 (6.7)	51.7 (10.9)	54.0 (12.2)	47.3 (8.5)	36.4 (2.4)	24.4 (−4.2)	12.6 (−10.8)	30.7 (−0.7)
Mean minimum °F (°C)	−17.2 (−27.3)	−13.7 (−25.4)	−5.1 (−20.6)	15.7 (−9.1)	27.7 (−2.4)	36.7 (2.6)	43.8 (6.6)	45.3 (7.4)	34.3 (1.3)	23.8 (−4.6)	5.8 (−14.6)	−10.6 (−23.7)	−20.5 (−29.2)
Record low °F (°C)	−34 (−37)	−34 (−37)	−24 (−31)	−8 (−22)	17 (−8)	25 (−4)	28 (−2)	33 (1)	23 (−5)	6 (−14)	−14 (−26)	−34 (−37)	−34 (−37)
Average precipitation inches (mm)	0.99 (25)	0.72 (18)	0.95 (24)	1.84 (47)	2.61 (66)	3.55 (90)	3.39 (86)	2.56 (65)	2.83 (72)	3.04 (77)	1.81 (46)	1.46 (37)	25.75 (654)
Average snowfall inches (cm)	15.6 (40)	8.7 (22)	6.0 (15)	3.3 (8.4)	0.0 (0.0)	0.0 (0.0)	0.0 (0.0)	0.0 (0.0)	0.0 (0.0)	0.1 (0.25)	3.8 (9.7)	13.4 (34)	50.9 (129)
Average extreme snow depth inches (cm)	29.9 (76)	22.2 (56)	16.4 (42)	5.6 (14)	0.1 (0.25)	0.0 (0.0)	0.0 (0.0)	0.0 (0.0)	0.0 (0.0)	0.0 (0.0)	3.1 (7.9)	10.9 (28)	23.8 (60)
Average precipitation days (≥ 0.01 in)	6.9	5.3	5.3	6.5	9.1	10.5	10.3	8.6	10.2	9.4	7.1	7.3	96.5
Average snowy days (≥ 0.1 in)	6.5	4.8	2.7	1.6	0.0	0.0	0.0	0.0	0.0	0.1	2.4	5.6	23.7
Source: NOAA

== Demographics ==
Historical population
Census	Pop.	Note	%±
1910	355		—
1920	443		24.8%
1930	618		39.5%
1940	855		38.3%
1950	1,078		26.1%
1960	1,301		20.7%
1970	1,301		0.0%
1980	1,289		−0.9%
1990	1,171		−9.2%
2000	1,353		15.5%
2010	1,351		−0.1%
2020	1,337		−1.0%
2021 (est.)	1,340		0.2%
U.S. Decennial Census; 2020 Census

=== 2010 census ===
As of the census of 2010, there were 1,351 people, 673 households, and 331 families in the city. The population density was 465.9 inhabitants per square mile (179.9/km^{2}). There were 863 housing units, with an average density of 297.6 per square mile (114.9/km^{2}). The racial makeup of the city was 93.4% white, 0.4% African American, 2.4% Native American, 0.5% Asian, 0.1% Pacific Islander, 0.6% from other races, and 2.5% from two or more races. Hispanic and Latino residents of any race were 1.6% of the population.

There were 673 households, of which 21.5% had children under the age of 18 living with them, 37.1% were married couples living together, 9.4% had a female householder with no husband present, 2.7% had a male householder with no wife present, and 50.8% were non-families; 43.7% of all households were made up of individuals, and 18.6% had someone living alone who was 65 years of age or older. The average household size was 1.94 persons, and the average family size was 2.67.

The median age in the city was 48.4 years; 18.1% of residents were under the age of 18; 5.1% were between the ages of 18 and 24; 23.2% were from 25 to 44; 30.8% were from 45 to 64; and 23% were 65 years of age or older. The gender makeup of the city was 45.9% male and 54.1% female.

=== 2000 census ===
As of the census of 2000, there were 1,353 people, 645 households, and 341 families residing in the city. The population density was 506.7 inhabitants per square mile (195.6/km^{2}). There were 722 housing units, with an average density of 270.4 per square mile (104.4/km^{2}). The racial makeup of the city was 94.97% white, 2.81% Native American, 0.15% Asian, 0.15% Pacific Islander, 0.07% from other races, and 1.85% from two or more races. Hispanic and Latino residents of any race were 0.74% of the population. According to the census, 23.3% were of Norwegian, 20.2% German, 11.8% Swedish, 7.0% Irish and 6.1% English ancestry.

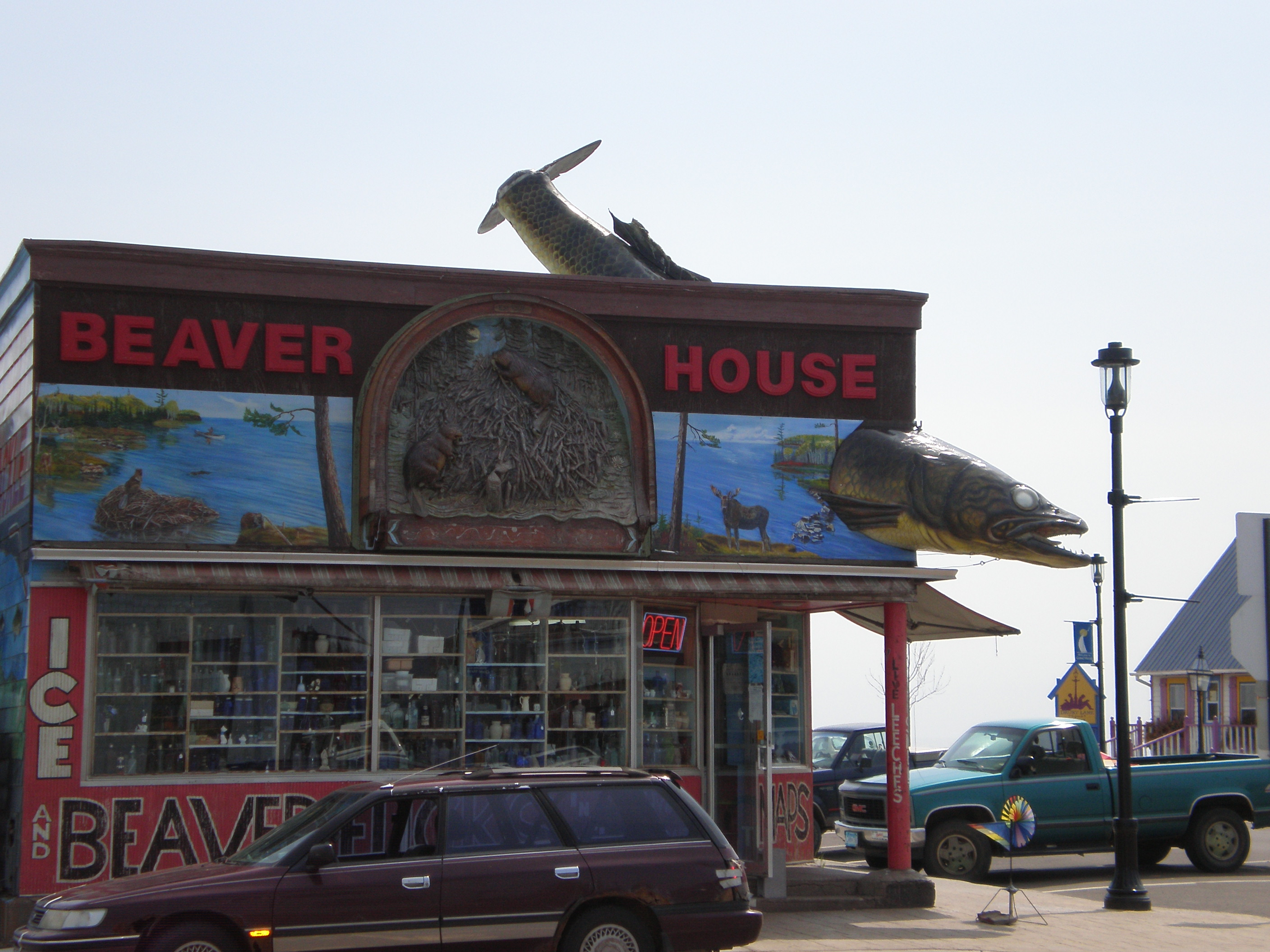
The giant walleye at Beaver House bait shop, a Grand Marais landmark

There were 645 households, of which 23.3% had children under the age of 18 living with them, 42.9% were married couples living together, 8.1% had a female householder with no husband present, and 47.1% were non-families; 42.0% of all households were made up of individuals, and 21.6% had someone living alone who was 65 years of age or older. The average household size was 2.01 and the average family size was 2.73.

In the city 18.8% of the population were under the age of 18; 6.1% were from 18 to 24; 25.9% were from 25 to 44; 22.8% were from 45 to 64; and 26.3% were 65 years of age or older. The median age was 45. For every 100 females, there were 83.1 males. For every 100 females age 18 and over, there were 80.8 males.

The median income for a household in the city was $33,493, and the median income for a family was $46,563. Males had a median income of $31,500. The median income for females was $23,393. The per capita income for the city was $21,863. About 7.4% of families and 10.0% of the population were below the poverty line, including 11.9% of those under age 18 and 12.0% of those age 65 or over.

== Arts and culture ==
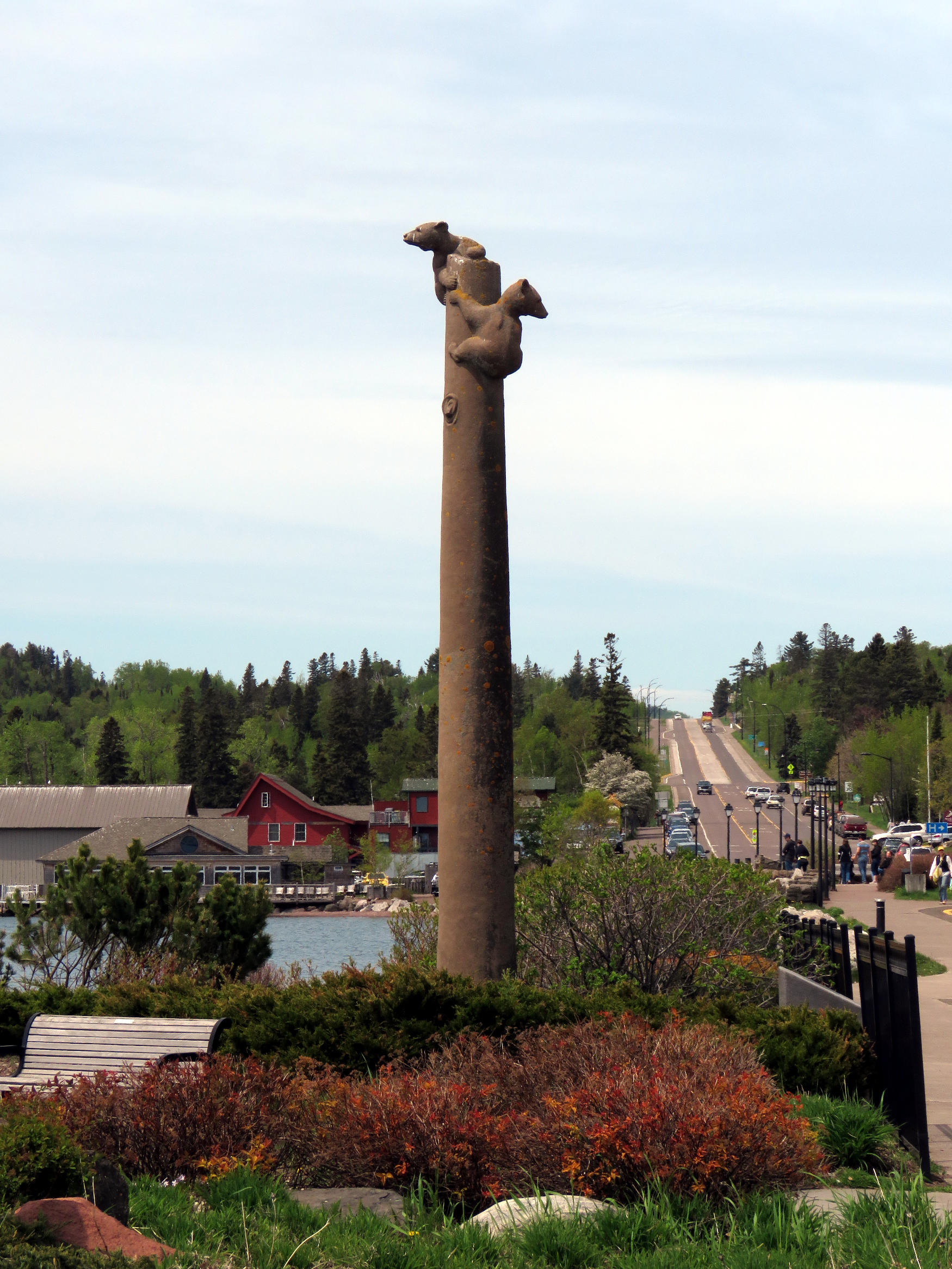
Grand Marais waterfront sculpture depicting bear cubs

Due to the pleasant summer climate with Lake Superior's cooling and temperature moderating effect, and due to the lake-effect snow in winter, tourism is a large component of the town's economy. Grand Marais hosts numerous festivals. They celebrate the history and culture of the North Shore and the city itself.

- Fisherman's Picnic is held in Grand Marais during the first weekend in August. It originated in the days when the area's economy was based on logging and commercial fishing, and the community gathered for a shoreline potluck picnic featuring a fish fry of fresh Lake Superior herring. The tradition continues with the Lions Club's Famous Fishburger Stand. Herring, still provided by local commercial fishermen, is dipped in coating, fried golden brown and served piping hot on a hot dog bun. Each year, Fisherman's Picnic features fireworks over the harbor, contests, and a parade.
- Moose Madness is held the third weekend in October. It celebrates the area's moose population, and is a family-themed event with games, prizes, and activities.
- Grand Marais Arts Festival. This longstanding event is held in early July along Lake Superior's North Shore, in town, with over 70 local and regional artists, live music, and art demonstrations. It is hosted by the Grand Marais Art Colony.
- Summer and Winter Solstice Festivals, hosted by the North House Folk School.
- Le Grand Du Nord. This bicycle race takes place on Memorial Day weekend. The 110 mile route of mostly gravel roads includes 7,000 feet of climbing.
- Lake Superior Storm Fest, sponsored by Visit Cook County, celebrated the gales of November and stormy season of Lake Superior.

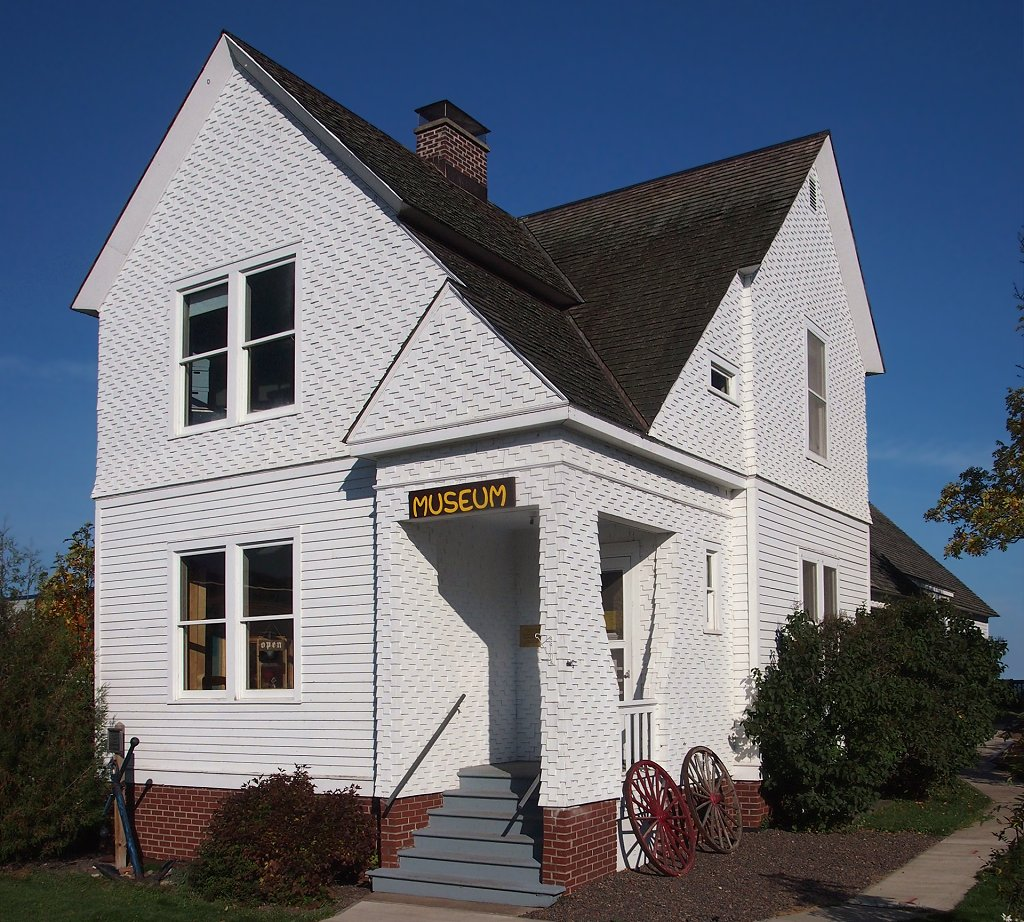
Lightkeeper's House

North House Folk School was founded in 1997 and teaches traditional northern crafts. Classes conducted by this school are a tourism draw for the community.

The downtown area features two buildings listed on the National Register of Historic Places: the 1896 Lightkeeper's House, which is home to the Cook County History Museum, and the Bally Blacksmith Shop, built in 1911 and home to a local family of smiths for nearly a century.

== Government ==
Presidential elections results
Year	Republican	Democratic	Third parties
2024	24.3% 201	72.4% 598	3.3% 27
2020	27.0% 241	69.8% 623	3.2% 29
2016	30.5% 242	60.1% 477	9.4% 75
2012	33.3% 265	62.9% 500	3.8% 30
2008	40.9% 296	56.3% 407	2.8% 20
2004	45.0% 382	52.7% 447	2.3% 20
2000	44.7% 371	46.7% 388	8.6% 71
1996	43.8% 344	46.6% 366	9.6% 76
1992	36.4% 302	36.4% 302	27.2% 226
1988	49.7% 431	50.3% 437	0.0% 0
1984	55.8% 501	44.2% 397	0.0% 0
1980	57.5% 514	33.4% 299	9.1% 81
1976	53.5% 416	43.1% 335	3.4% 26
1972	62.6% 438	36.3% 254	1.1% 8
1968	55.8% 384	40.3% 277	3.9% 27
1964	45.9% 332	54.1% 391	0.0% 0
1960	63.5% 443	36.5% 255	0.0% 0

== Education ==
All of the county is zoned to Cook County ISD 166.

== Media ==
=== Newspapers ===
- Cook County News Herald
- Northern Wilds Media is a monthly magazine that covers the lifestyle of Lake Superior’s North Shore, the BWCAW and northwestern Ontario with news, events, features, and columns.

=== Radio ===
- WMLS FM 88.7, Minnesota Public Radio classical
- WLSN FM 89.7, Minnesota Public Radio news and talk
- WTIP FM 90.7, North Shore Community Radio
- K220BI FM 91.9, simulcasting Duluth's Christian talk and teaching KDNI owned by the University of Northwestern – St Paul
- K288BF FM 105.5, simulcasting Duluth's Contemporary Christian KDNW owned by the University of Northwestern – St Paul

== See also ==
- Grand Marais Light
- Grand Marais/Cook County Airport
- Grand Marais/Cook County Seaplane Base
