= Granite Peak Ski Area =

Ski area in Wisconsin, United States

Granite Peak Ski Resort
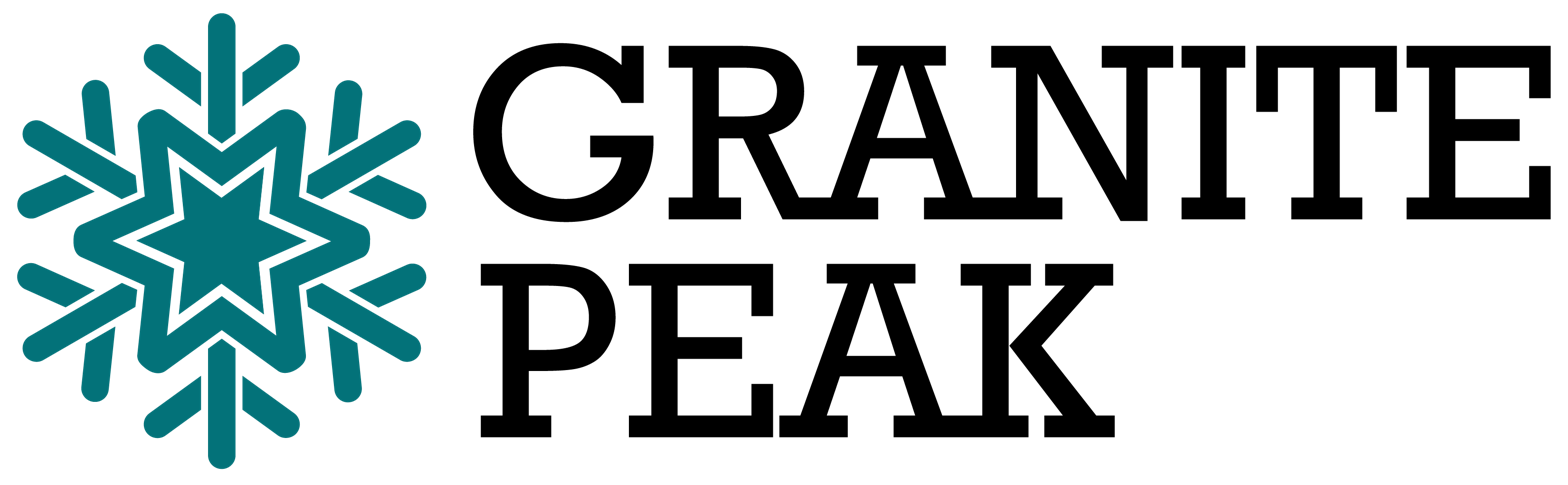

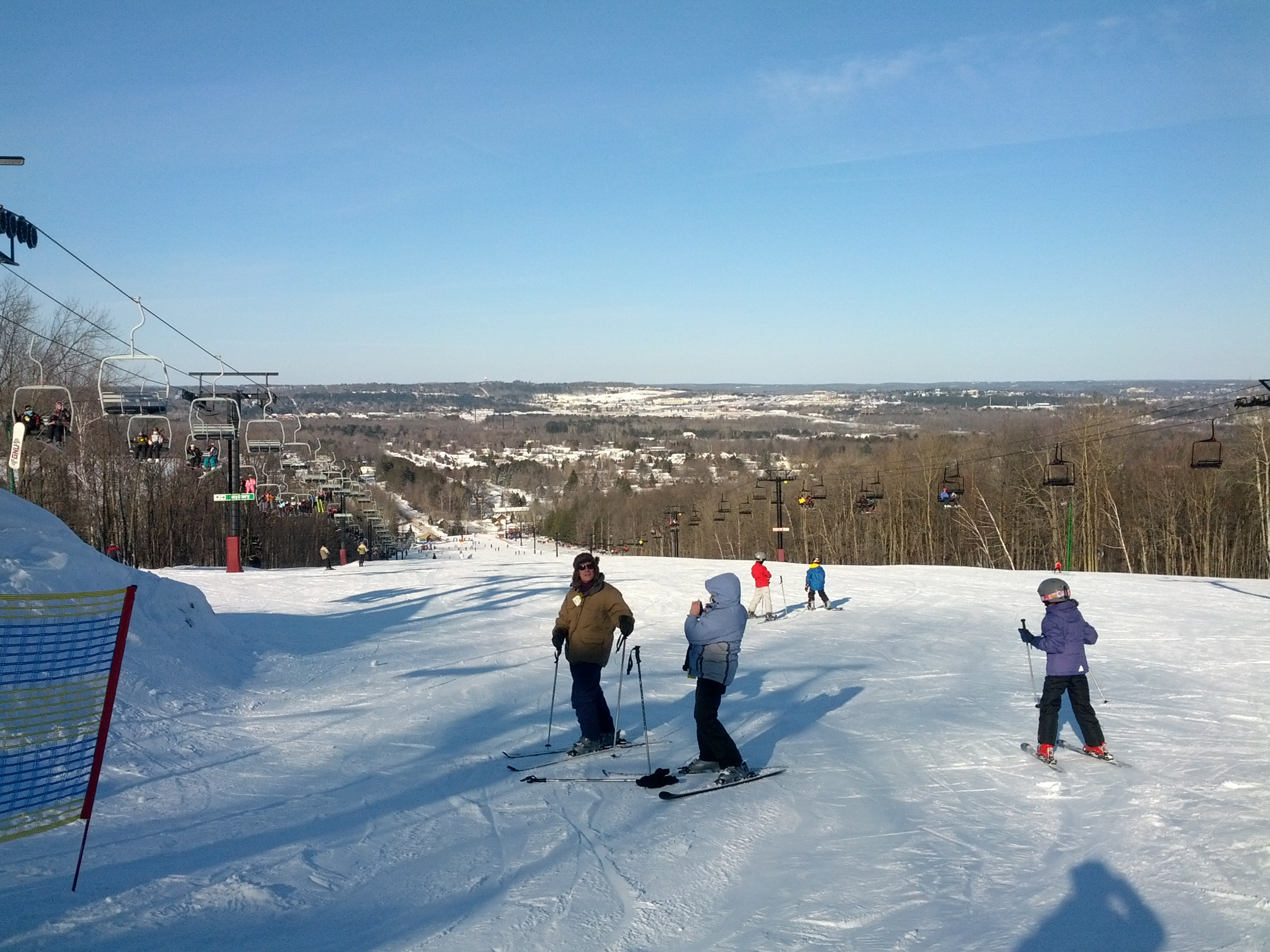
- Granite Peak Ski Area in 2013
- Interactive map of Granite Peak Ski Resort
- Location: Rib Mountain CDP, Town of Rib Mountain, Marathon County, Wisconsin, U.S.
- Mountain: Rib Mountain
- Nearest city: Wausau
- Coordinates: 44°55′43″N 89°40′57″W
- Opened: 1937
- Owner: Midwest Family Ski Resorts
- Multi-resort pass: Ikon
- Vertical: 700 ft (213 m)
- Top elevation: 1,942 ft (592 m)
- Base elevation: 1,242 ft (379 m)
- Skiable area: 277 acres (112 ha)
- Trails: 67
- Longest run: 0.8 mi (1.3 km)
- Lift system: 7 total: 1 high-speed six chairlift, 2 high-speed quad chairlift, 2 triple chairs, 2 magic carpet
- Lift capacity: 14100 passengers/hour
- Terrain parks: 3
- Snowfall: 60 inches (150 cm)
- Snowmaking: 100%
- Night skiing: 73%
- Website: skigranitepeak.com

Granite Peak Ski Resort is a ski area located in Rib Mountain State Park in the Town of Rib Mountain, Marathon County, Wisconsin, south of Wausau. It features 58 runs and 4 terrain parks as of 2022 and boasts a vertical drop of 700 feet (213 m). Granite Peak is the fourth tallest ski area in the Midwest, after Terry Peak (1,100) in the Black Hills of South Dakota, Mount Bohemia (900 ft.) in Michigan's Upper Peninsula and Lutsen Mountain (825 ft.) on Minnesota's north shore of Lake Superior. It is ten miles (16 km) north-northeast of Central Wisconsin Airport.

When the ski area opened on the slopes of Rib Mountain in 1937, it was one of the first ski areas in North America. Stowe in Vermont had opened a few years earlier in 1934. Sun Valley in Idaho had become the nation's first ski resort in the western states in 1936.

Skiing on Rib Mountain has been expanded significantly since 2000 when Granite Peak Ski Area took over ski area operations, increasing to 58 runs, with seven new chairlifts and a new base village.

Rib Mountain State Park, in which Granite Peak operates under a 30-year lease, approved in 2022 a new Master Plan which will add an additional 125 acres of terrain to the ski area footprint with plans for an additional two lifts and 8 additional trails. Four trails and a lift will be added in the plan to the east and four trails and a lift will be added in the west. Mountain biking, hiking and trails encircling the park are also in the plans for the future.
