= Ullr Mountain =

Mountain in Minnesota, United States

Highest point
- Elevation: 1,541 ft (470 m)
- Coordinates: 47°40′09″N 90°42′54″W

Geography
- Location: Lutsen Township, Cook County, Minnesota, U.S.
- Parent range: Sawtooth Mountains

Ullr Mountain is a peak in the Sawtooth Mountains of northeastern Minnesota in the United States. Its elevation is 1,541 feet (470 meters) above sea level. It is located near Lake Superior and is part of the Lutsen Mountains ski resort, along with three other mountains: Mystery Mountain, Moose Mountain, and Eagle Mountain.

== Etymology ==
Ullr Mountain gets its name from the Norse god Ullr, the Norse god associated with skiing.

== Location ==
Ullr Mountain is located in Cook County, Minnesota within the Lutsen Mountains ski resort. Lutsen Mountains ski resort lies within the boundary of Superior National Forest and operates under a special permit granted by the Forest Service.
