= Rib Mountain (disambiguation) =

Rib Mountain is a monadnock in Wisconsin, U.S.

Rib Mountain may also refer to:

- Rib Mountain, Wisconsin, U.S., a village
  - Rib Mountain (CDP), Wisconsin
- Rib Mountain (Ontario), Canada
