= Pincushion Mountain =

Mountain in Minnesota, United States

Coordinates: 47°46′15″N 90°19′00″W

Pincushion Mountain is a peak in the Sawtooth Mountains near the midpoint of the southern boundary of Cook County, which is formed by the north shore of Lake Superior.

Pincushion Mountain is accessible via hiking trail. To reach the peak from the nearest town, Grand Marais, requires a three mile drive to the trailhead and a nine-mile out-and-back hike. From atop Pincusion Mountain one has a panoramic view of the Sawtooth Mountains, Lake Superior, and the town, harbor, and lighthouse of Grand Marais.
