= Reuben B. Carlton =

Minnesota politician (1812–1863)

- Carlton c. 1858

Member of the Minnesota Senate from the 26th District
- In office December 2, 1857 – December 6, 1859
- Governor: Samuel Medary; Henry Hastings Sibley
- Preceded by: Position established
- Succeeded by: Thomas Clark

Personal details
- Born: March 4, 1812 Onondaga County, New York, U.S.
- Died: December 6, 1863 (aged 51) Fond du Lac, Minnesota, U.S.

Reuben B. Carlton (March 4, 1812 – December 6, 1863), also written as R.B. Carlton, was an American politician, farmer, blacksmith, and early settler of Duluth, Minnesota. Carlton is the namesake of Carlton County, Minnesota, the city of Carlton, Minnesota, and Carlton Peak in the Sawtooth Mountains.

== Biography ==
Carlton was born on March 4, 1812, in Onondaga County, New York.

Beginning in 1847 Carlton moved to Minnesota Territory and settled in Fond du Lac, a neighborhood of Duluth, Minnesota. Carlton is credited with being the first settler of Fond du Lac where he lived and worked as a farmer and blacksmith for the Ojibwe.

Beginning in 1857 Carlton entered Minnesota politics running as a candidate for a seat in the Minnesota Senate representing the 26th senate district which included the counties of Buchanan, Carlton, Itasca, Lake, and St. Louis. Carlton was elected to office on October 13, 1857, and would serve a single term in the 1st Minnesota Legislature from December 2, 1857, to December 6, 1859.^{64} While in the senate Carlton was the chair of the Harbors Committee and the Militia Committee.

Carlton died on December 6, 1863, in Fond du Lac.

== Legacy ==
Several places in the state of Minnesota are named in honor of Carlton including Carlton County, Minnesota, the city of Carlton, Minnesota, and a small summit in the Sawtooth Mountains known as Carlton Peak in Cook County, Minnesota.
