= Charles Zarnke =

American politician

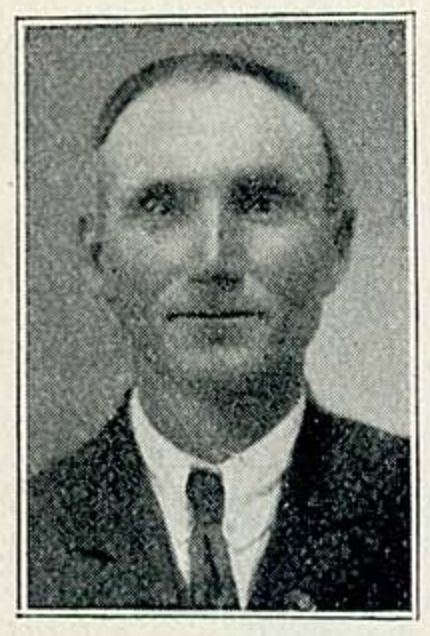
Charles Zarnke, Wisconsin farmer, Socialist legislator, and janitor

Charles F. Zarnke (July 19, 1868 - May 16, 1931) was a farmer, janitor and Socialist state legislator from Marathon County, Wisconsin.

== Background ==
Zarnke was born in Germany on July 19, 1868. He immigrated to America at age fourteen and farmed in the town of Flieth (later Rib Mountain) for 28 years. He served as Town Chairman from 1904 to 1909 and as town treasurer from 1914 to 1917.

== Elected office ==
Zarnke was elected to the Wisconsin State Assembly in 1918 to represent the first district of Marathon County for the 1919–1920 session, defeating incumbent Republican Herman Hedrich by 1763 (56.2%) votes to 1374 (43.8%). He served on the standing committees on fish and game and on enrolled bills.

In 1920, he was defeated for re-election by Republican Joseph Weix, who received 3717 votes, to 2296 for Zarnke and 915 for Democrat Jerry Bradley.

== Personal life ==
On June 27, 1891, he was married (at Colby, Wisconsin) to Nora Smart. They had twelve children.

When he retired from farming in 1923, they moved to Wausau. He had worked as a janitor at the Wausau School District Central School Building for about three years before a year-long illness which led to his death on May 16, 1931 at their home in Wausau. He is buried in Pine Grove Cemetery in Wausau.
