= Carlton Peak =

Summit in the Sawtooth Mountains of Minnesota

Coordinates: 47°35′00″N 90°51′37″W

Carlton Peak is a summit in the Sawtooth Mountains in southern Tofte Township, Cook County, in northeastern Minnesota in the United States. In 1848, Reuben B. Carlton of Fond du Lac, Minnesota, ascended the peak with Col. Charles Whittlesey, who was participating in a geological survey expedition. In appreciation, Whittlesey named the mountain in Carlton's honor. Carlton Peak is now a Day Use area of Temperance River State Park and requires a valid Minnesota State Parks sticker per the sign on the road on the south side of the peak.

== Geologic history ==
Carlton Peak was formed about a billion years ago in the same period of volcanic activity that created the shoreline of Lake Superior, in northern Minnesota. During this period, several blocks of anorthosite poked through the magma. The magma eventually became the diabase on the shoreline; the anorthosite became Carlton Peak.

== Gallery ==
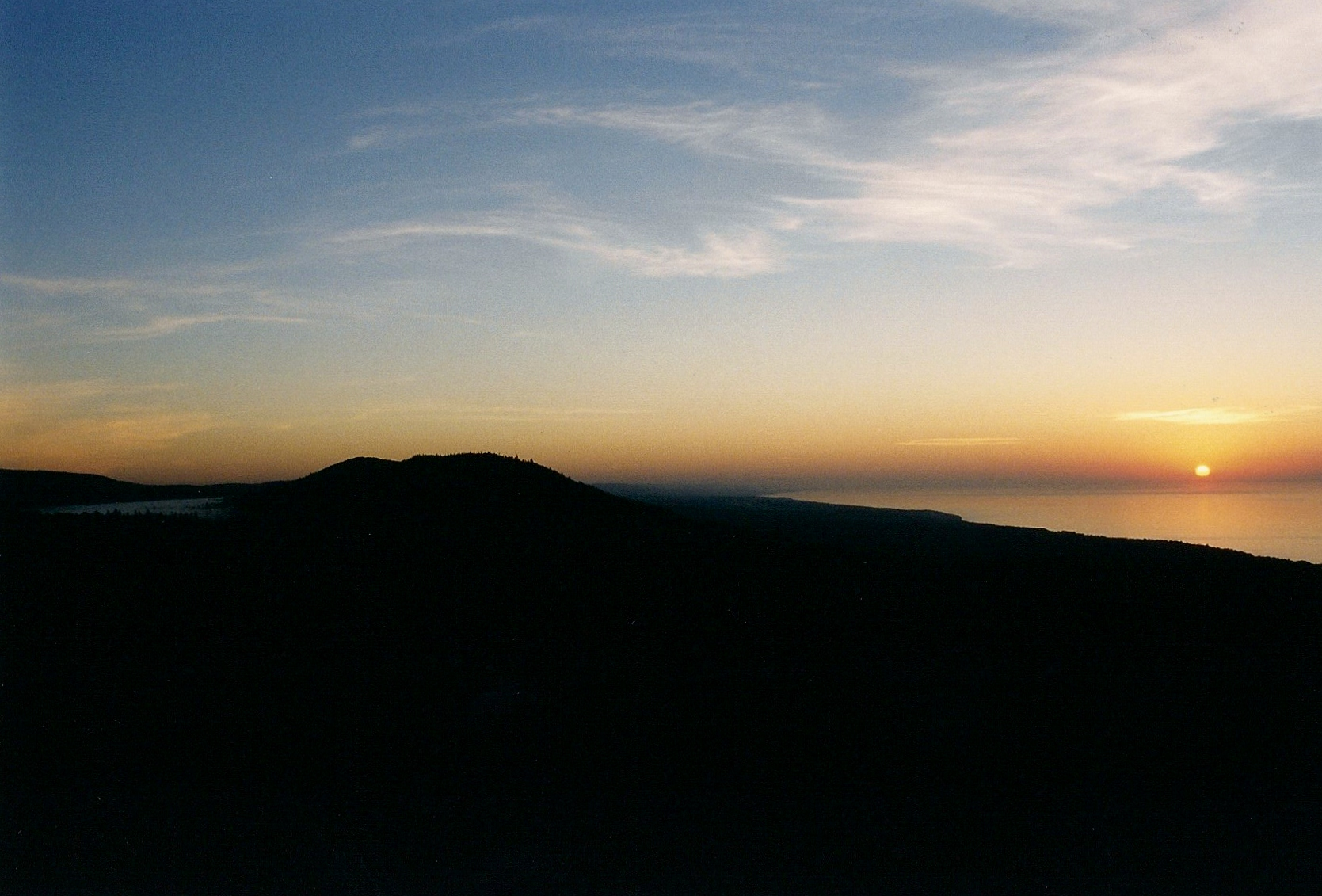
North Shore sunrise from Carlton Peak - Superior National Forest

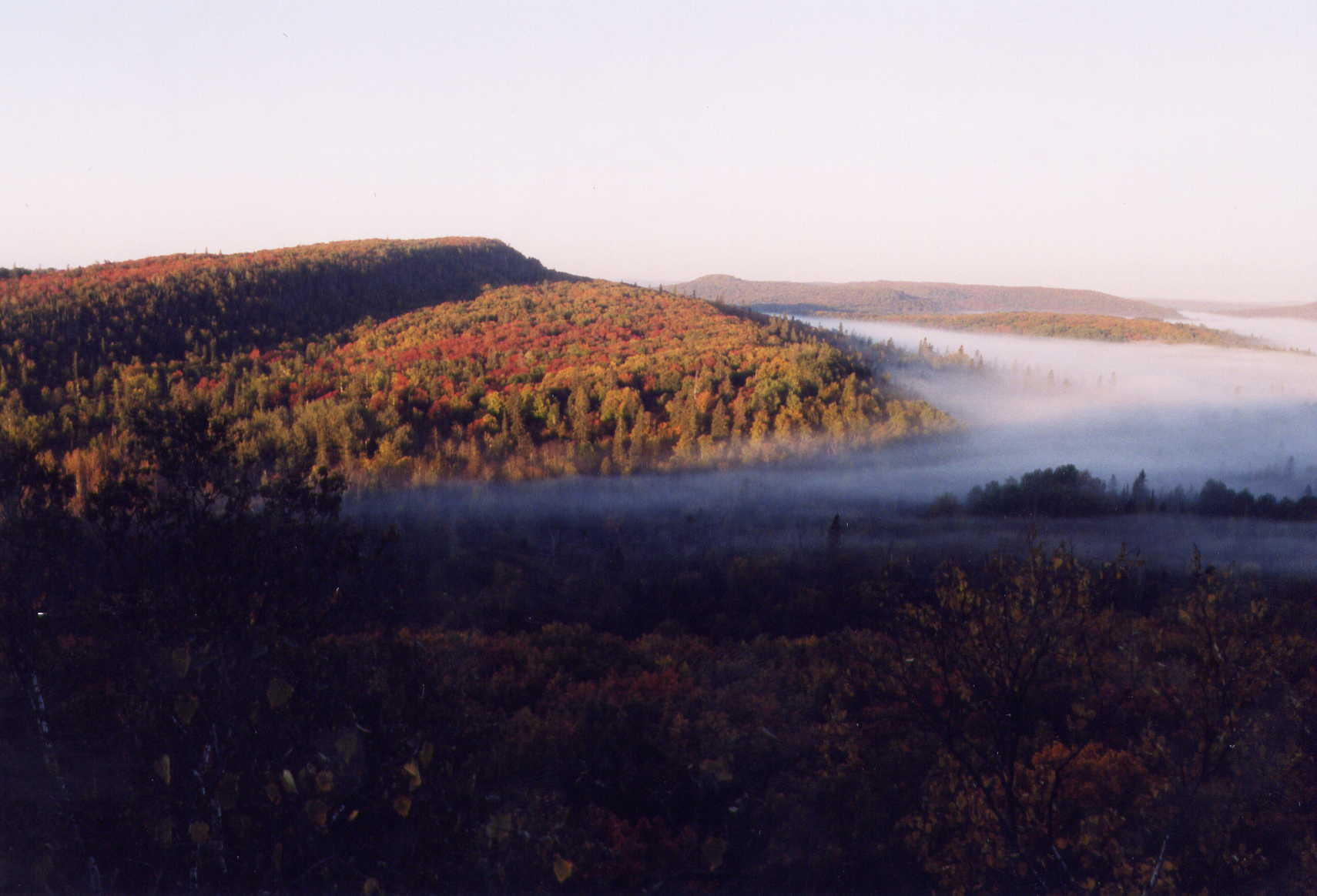
Carlton Peak color - Superior National Forest
