= Mount Bohemia =

Ski resort in Michigan, United States

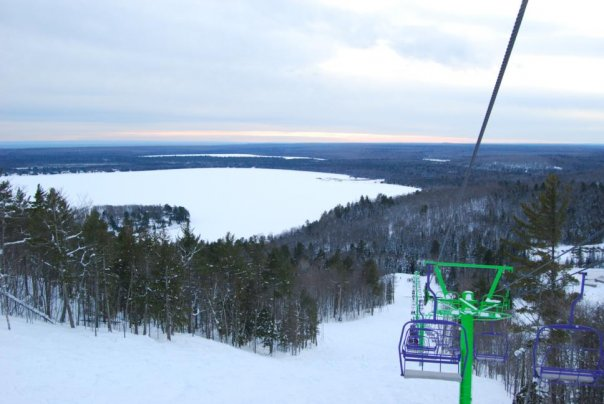
- A view of Lac La Belle from the main chairlift

- Location within Michigan
- Location: Grant Township, Keweenaw County, at Lac La Belle, Michigan
- Coordinates: 47°23′30″N 88°0′49″W
- Vertical: 804 ft (245 m)
- Skiable area: 550 acres (220 ha)
- Trails: 95
- Longest run: 1 m (3 ft 3 in)
- Lift system: 1 triple chair, 1 double chair.
- Terrain parks: No
- Snowfall: 300 in. avg. annually
- Snowmaking: no
- Night skiing: occasional weekends
- Website: mtbohemia.com

Mount Bohemia is the 5th highest point in the Keweenaw Peninsula and the 52nd highest prominent peak in Michigan with an elevation of 1,465 feet (447 m).

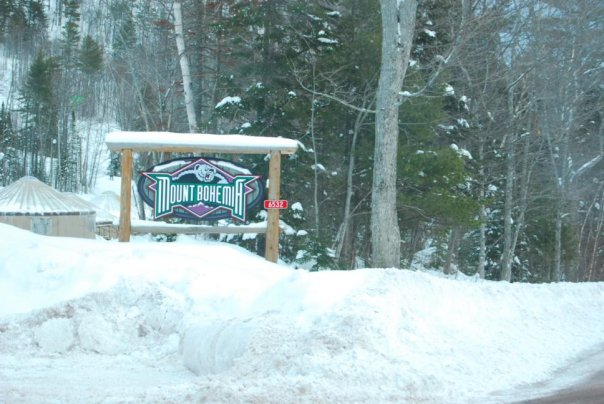
A view of the sign from the entrance

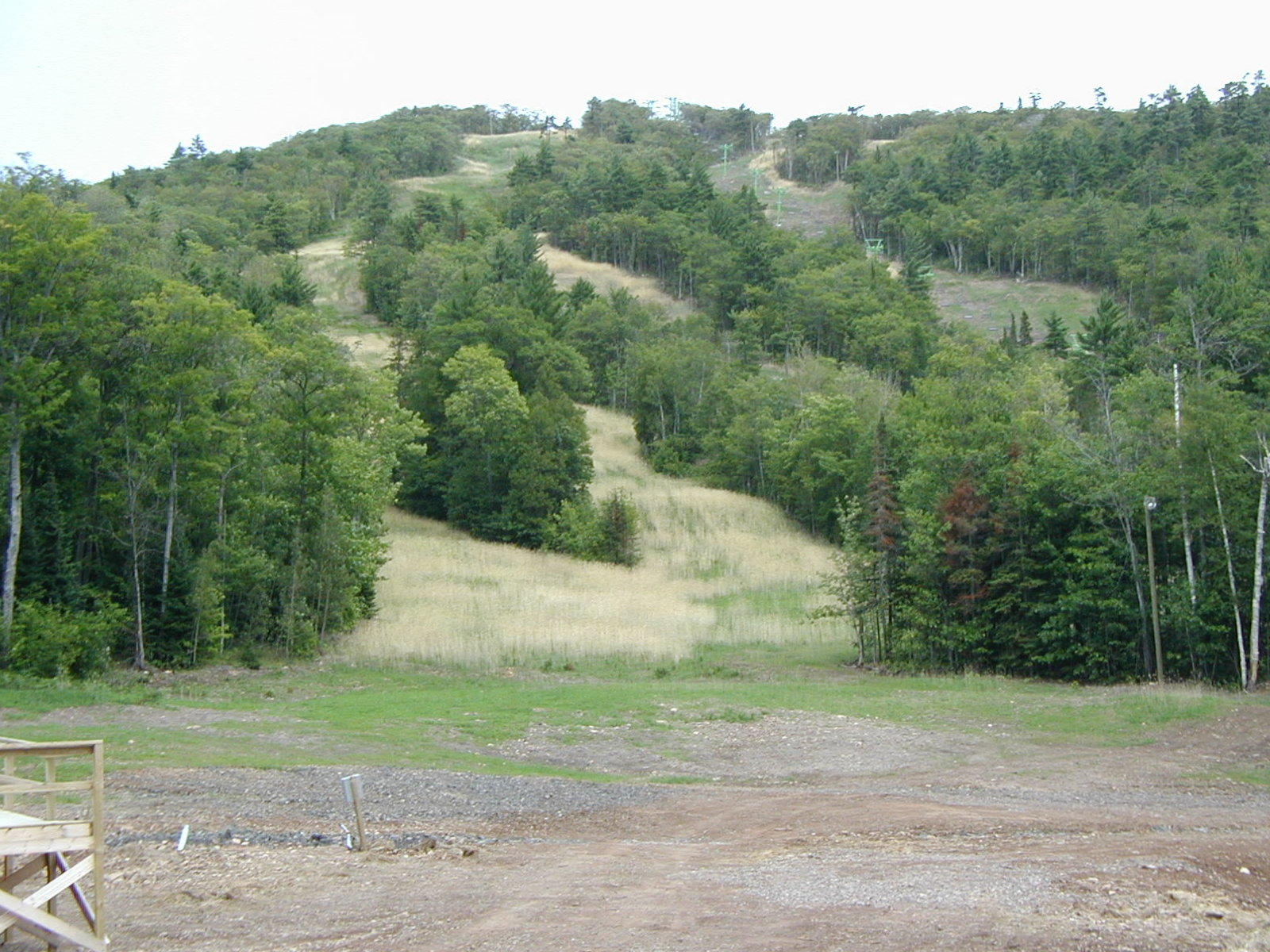
Mount Bohemia

Mount Bohemia is host to a ski resort bearing the same name located at the northernmost portion of the Keweenaw Peninsula in Mohawk, Michigan. Mount Bohemia operates two chairlifts, and offers the highest vertical drop in the Midwest, ahead of Lutsen Mountains, located in the Sawtooth Mountains of northern Minnesota. The resort has 95 runs and first opened for business in 2000.

Mount Bohemia does not operate any snow making equipment and relies on its 250 to 300 in (6.4–7.6 m) year average of lake effect snow, the most seen at any resort in the Midwest. Because runs are not groomed, Mount Bohemia is not an appropriate resort for beginners. It offers only single, double and triple black diamond level runs, as well as three intermediate blue runs (no green beginner trails).

Mount Bohemia also offers the only Cat skiing experience in the midwest at Voodoo Mountain.

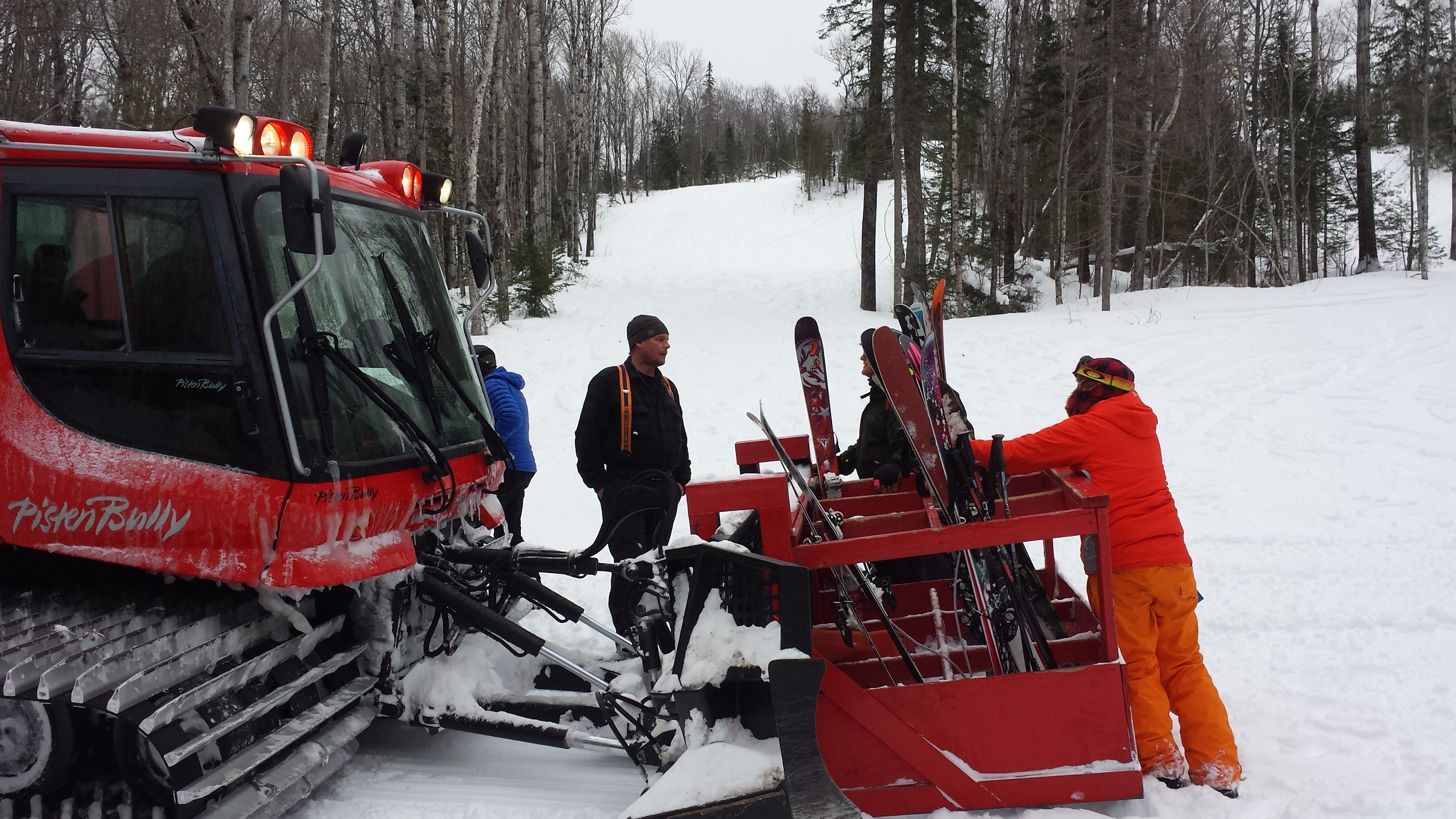
Cat skiing at Voodoo Mountain ( Mount Bohemia)
