= Lutsen Mountains =

Ski resort in Minnesota, United States

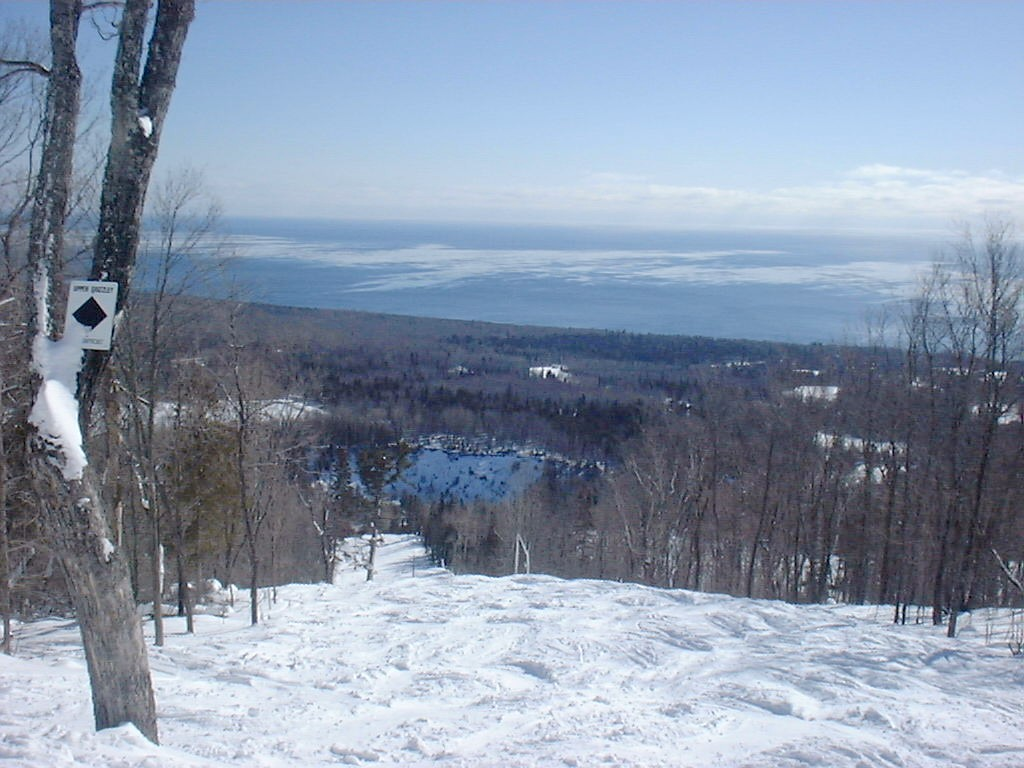
- Upper Grizzly run on Moose Mountain, overlooking Lake Superior.
- Interactive map of Lutsen Mountains
- Location: Lutsen Township, Minnesota, Minnesota
- Nearest city: Lutsen
- Coordinates: 47.664°N 90.714°W
- Vertical: 773 ft (236 m)
- Top elevation: 1,678 ft (511 m)
- Base elevation: 905 ft (276 m)
- Skiable area: 593 acres (2.40 km^{2})
- Trails: 95; 18 – Easiest; 47 – More Difficult; 25 – Most Difficult; 10 – Expert
- Longest run: 2 miles (3.2 km)
- Lift system: 9 total: 1 gondola 7 chairlifts 1 surface lift
- Snowfall: app. 115 in (290 cm)
- Snowmaking: 231 acres (0.93 km^{2})
- Night skiing: none
- Website: lutsen.com

Lutsen Mountains is a ski area in the north central United States; in northeastern Minnesota. It is home to 95 runs across 4 mountains, with a maximum vertical drop of 773 feet. Average snowfall accumulation is around 10 feet each season. During the summer, the area serves as a hiking destination and getaway resort with nearby access to the Boundary Waters Canoe Area Wilderness (BWCAW) and Lake Superior.

== Location ==
Lutsen is one of the northernmost ski areas in the contiguous United States. It is located in the Sawtooth Mountains, which are hills that are part of the Superior Highlands on the north shore of Lake Superior. Lutsen receives natural snow, at times lake effect snow from the lake at its foot, and also has snowmaking equipment. Lutsen Mountains Resort is the largest ski resort in the Midwest, also having the 3rd most vertical drop in the Midwest behind Terry Peak and Mount Bohemia. The ski season extends from November into mid-April, longer than most other resorts in the Upper Midwest.

== Ski runs and terrain ==
The ski area consists of four hills, named Eagle, Ullr, Mystery, and Moose Mountains. The ski resort's "Eagle Mountain" should not be confused with Eagle Mountain, the highest point in Minnesota, which is actually in the Boundary Waters Canoe Area. The base sits at the feet of Eagle and Ullr Mountains.

=== Eagle Mountain ===
Eagle Mountain consists of 21 primary runs (in which two have terrain parks), 4 side-country runs, and two chairlifts. It is typically open from 9:00 am–4:00 pm during the season. The run difficulty breakdown is 3 double black diamonds, 10 black diamonds, 9 blue, and 3 green. The base and gondola (to Moose Mountain) are easily accessible from multiple runs. Two junior race courses, 1 mogul, and 2 terrain park runs sit on the mountain.

=== Ullr Mountain ===
Ullr Mountain consists of 8 short runs (7 primary and 1 side-country), one chairlift, and one surface lift. The run difficulty breakdown is 5 blue, and 3 green. The base and gondola are accessible from all runs.

=== Mystery Mountain ===
Mystery Mountain is accessible from the bottom of Eagle and Mystery Mountains. There is one chairlift that provides access to 10 runs (2 primary and 8 side-country), one of which consists of a terrain park featuring banked turns, jumps and rollers. The run difficulty breakdown is 2 black diamond and 8 blue.

=== Moose Mountain ===
Moose Mountain is the largest of the four mountains and provides views of Lake Superior from the Southeast facing slope. It features 52 runs, including 9 double black diamond, 13 black diamond, and 30 blue, 1 terrain park, and 1 mogul run. The mountain can be accessed from the resort base via Gondola or the Moose Access run from Eagle Mountain. Two chair lifts (including one six-person lift) can be found at the bases of the two east-facing slopes. The Summit Chalet can be found at the top of the mountain right off of the Gondola. Three double black diamond runs drop off of the Northwest slope.

== History and future plans ==
Lutsen Mountains ski resort was founded in 1948 by George Nelson, the grandson of C.A.A. Nelson, the founder of Lutsen Resort on Lake Superior.

In 1989, Lutsen Mountains installed a German-made PHB Hall gondola to connect the base area and Moose Mountain. The gondola was the first gondola in a mid-American ski resort. Lutsen Mountains has a reputation for being family-friendly, as it was named as a Top 20 Family Ski Resort two years in a row among other accolades. Lutsen Mountains hosts two resorts, Caribou Highlands and Eagle Ridge, which offer a wide variety of rooms, condos, and townhomes. Many of them feature ski-in/ski-out access to the mountains.

In May 2013, it was announced that Lutsen Mountains would install a six-place high speed detachable lift on Moose Mountain, the Caribou Express, to replace the Caribou double chair.

In summer 2014, Lutsen Mountains installed a new $5 million pipeline to carry water for snowmaking from Lake Superior to the resort's pumping facility. Prior to the new pipeline, Lutsen Mountains faced criticism for using a waiver to pump water from the Poplar River, a designated trout stream, as this practice had been illegal since 1977 in Minnesota.

In January 2022, Charles Skinner became the sole owner of Lutsen Mountains, purchasing co-president and brother-in-law Tom Rider's 50% ownership interest.

On May 25, 2022, Lutsen announced that they would be replacing the Bridge chair with a Leither Poma six person lift for the 2023/24 ski season.

=== 2017 expansion plan ===
Citing the need to compete with ski resorts out West, Lutsen Mountains began considering expansion as early as 2014, when it began drafting a development plan and meeting with tribal leaders. In December 2014, it was announced that Lutsen would begin its expansion and modernization efforts by purchasing and installing a $7 million Doppelmayr 8-passenger high-speed gondola to bring skiers between Eagle and Moose Mountains, replacing the current PHB Hall Skycruiser model, which was installed as a used lift in the late 1980s. The upgraded gondola opened in 2015.

In 2017, Lutsen Mountains applied for a Special Use Permit from the U.S. Forest Service outlining proposed development of 495 acres of the Superior National Forest. The plan included two new base facilities, seven chairlifts, two new snowmaking reservoirs, and more; much of this development would occur on the south face of Moose Mountain. The announcement garnered immediate attention, given a request to expand a ski resort on public land is unusual in the Midwest. Lutsen Mountains was also the largest Midwestern ski resort at the time of announcement.

The proposal drew 560 public comments by December 2021, with local tourism boosters and businesses in favor, while environmental advocates and tribal groups with treaty rights to the land opposed the plan. When the Cook County Chamber of Commerce came out in support of expansion, the Grand Portage Band of Lake Superior Chippewa sent a letter to the board criticizing dismissal of the historic use of the land by the Ojibwe people. Superior Highland Backcountry, a backcountry skiing organization, offered a low-impact alternative supported by tribal leaders: a hut-to-hut trail system abiding by current public land practices.

== U.S. Ski Team ==
Cindy Nelson (b. 1955), of the family that owned the ski resort, was the silver medalist at the 1982 Alpine World Ski Championships and bronze medalist in Alpine skiing at the 1976 Winter Olympics.
