= Rib Mountain State Park =

State park in Wisconsin, United States

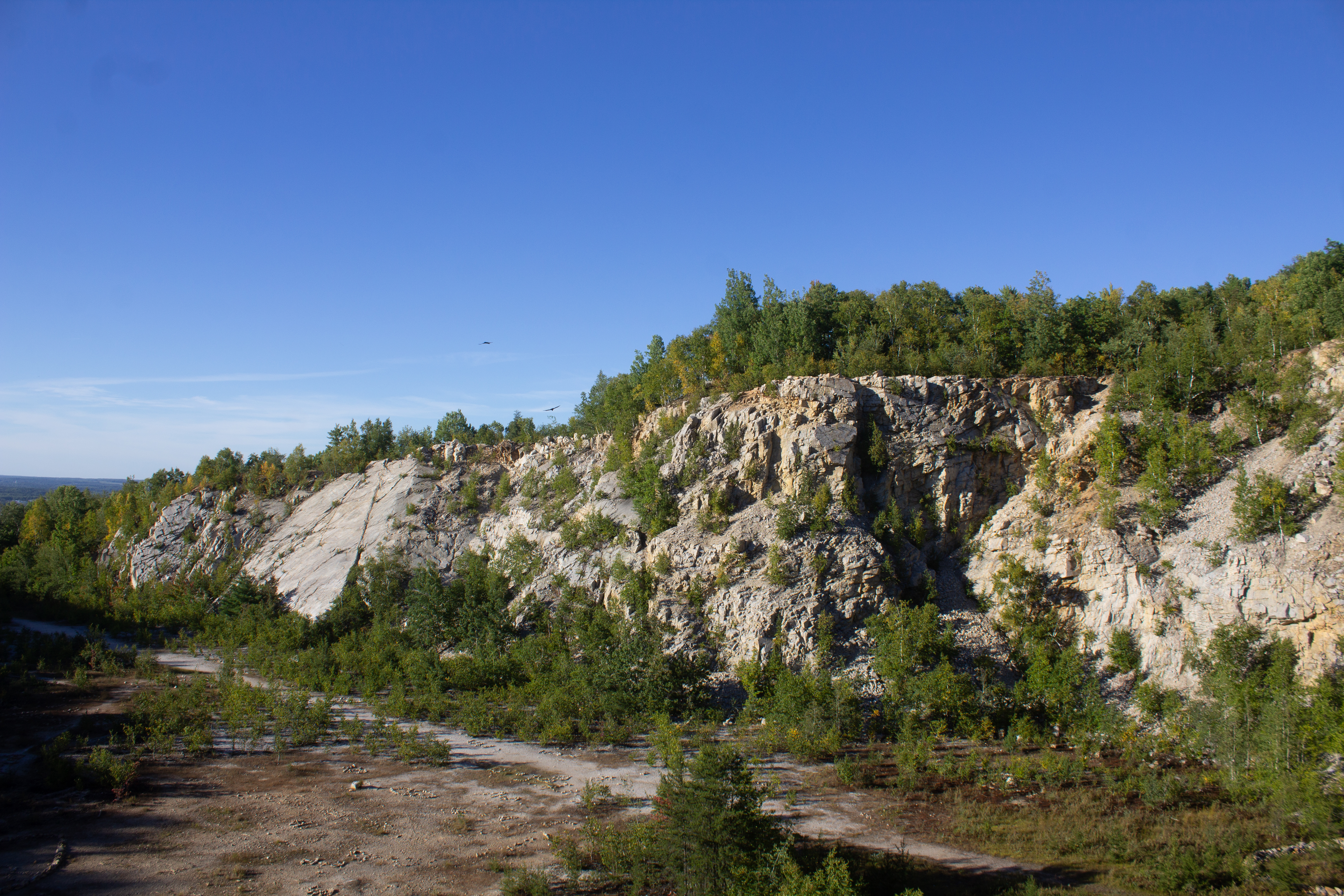
- Rib Mountain Quarry

- Location within Wisconsin Location within the United States
- Interactive map of Rib Mountain State Park
- Location: Marathon County, Wisconsin, United States
- Coordinates: 44°55′14″N 89°41′40″W
- Area: 1,528 acres (618 ha)
- Elevation: 1,916 ft (584 m)
- Established: 1927
- Administrator: Wisconsin Department of Natural Resources
- Website: Official website
- Wisconsin State Parks

Rib Mountain State Park is a state park in central Marathon County, Wisconsin, United States. The 1,528-acre (618 ha) park is located on Rib Mountain, a 1,942 feet (592 m) monadnock located 4 miles (6.4 km) southwest of downtown Wausau. It includes a ski resort, Granite Peak Ski Area, concession stand, picnic areas, a reservable amphitheater, a former quarry, observation tower, and 15.1 miles of trails. The park is ten miles (16 km) north-northwest of Central Wisconsin Airport.

== History ==
The ridge was known to the local Ojibwe as "O-pic-wun-a-se-be", sometimes rendered as "Opigigan" or "Opigeganama", with the first part meaning "rib". It served as a lookout and navigational landmark for both the Ojibwe and early European explorers. Early settlers attempted to exploit the mountain's mineral resources, primarily searching for gold without success. In 1893, Jacob Kolter began quarrying quartzite on the mountain's west side for sandpaper production. This effort led to the founding of the Wausau Sandpaper Company in 1900 and the Wausau Quartz Company in 1902. The two merged in 1905 to form Wausau Abrasives, which was acquired by Minnesota Mining and Manufacturing (now 3M) in 1929.

In 1922, the Wausau Kiwanis Club purchased 120 acres at the summit, later adding 40 more. A donation of 40 acres to the Wisconsin Conservation Department in 1923 resulted in the designation of Rib Mountain as a state park in 1927. A Civilian Conservation Corps (CCC) camp was established nearby in 1935. The CCC developed trails, improved roads, built a campground and gazebo, and, following advocacy by local leader Walter Roehl, prepared the area for winter sports by clearing ski slopes and installing a T-bar lift. The first major ski event, the Central Ski Association Championship, was held February 24–25, 1938, attracting over 465 participants and 3,000 spectators.

In December 1939, the CCC completed a shelter house, which remains in use today by Granite Peak Ski Area. By 1970, land donations had expanded the park to 606 acres, reaching nearly 860 acres by 1982. In the early 1980s, 3M closed the quarry and transferred the land to the Wisconsin Department of Natural Resources for park integration. The former quarry, accessible via park trails, may be used for bouldering, though technical climbing is prohibited due to unstable rock. Remnants of quarry operations, including a dynamite shed, are still present in the park.

In 2006, the upper level of the shelter/chalet was dedicated in honor of the 10th Mountain Alpine Division. The 10th Mountain Alpine Division served in the Italian Alps during WWII. Many of the original members of the Division are from the Wausau area and learned to ski at Rib Mountain.

== Geology ==
The park sits on top of a long tall and narrow ridge of quartzite that rises from the relatively flat central Wisconsin plain. The quartzite ridge dates back to the Penokean orogeny ~1.8 billion years ago, before this the quartzite was a large sandstone deposit on the edge of a shallow sea. The volcanic activity that resulted from the orogeny metamorphosed the sandstone into the present-day quartzite. The resulting quartzite is hard and much more resistant to erosion than the surrounding rock and over the following millennia the softer surrounding rock eroded revealing the present day ridge.

== Gallery ==
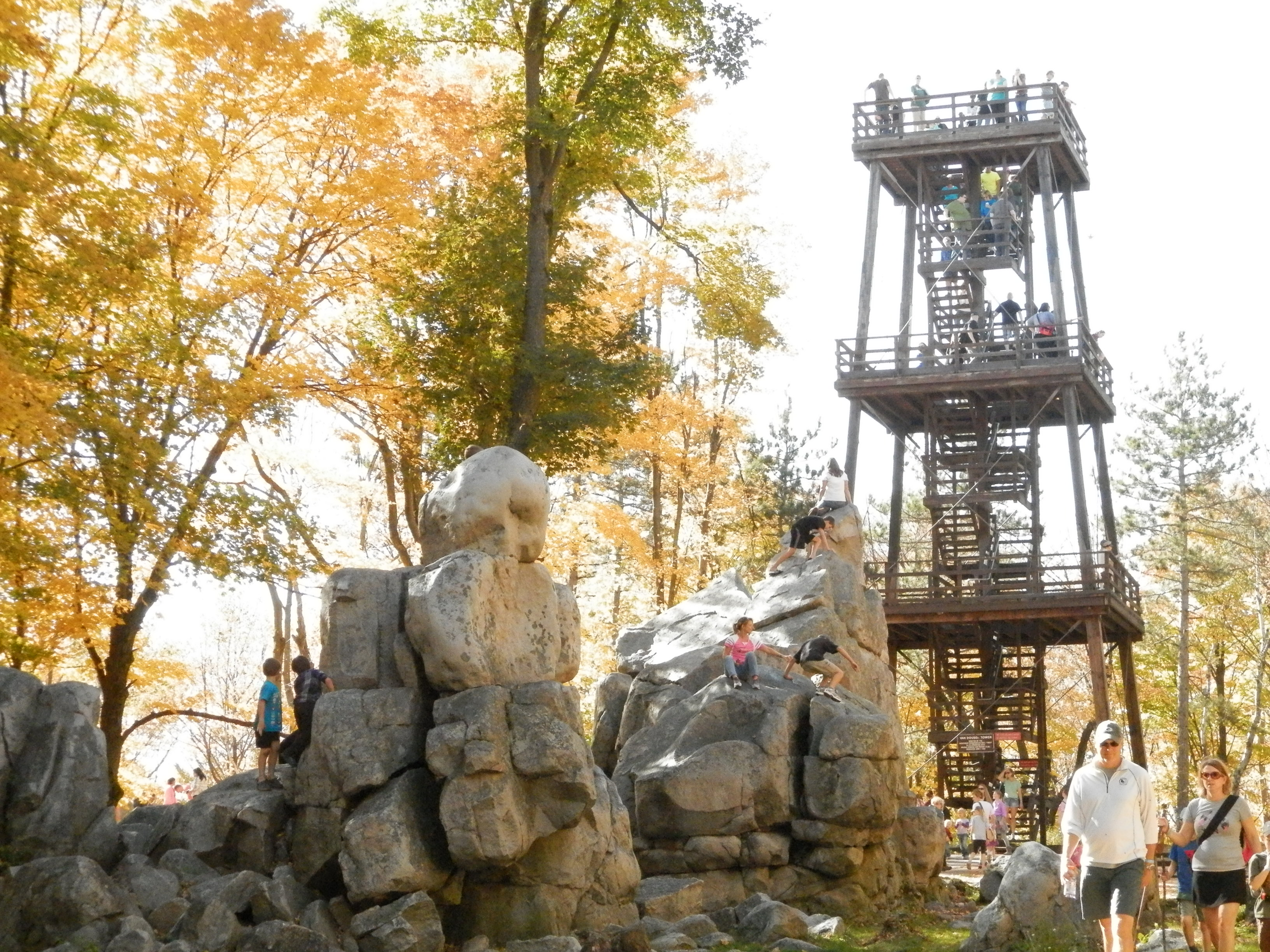
Highest point and observation tower

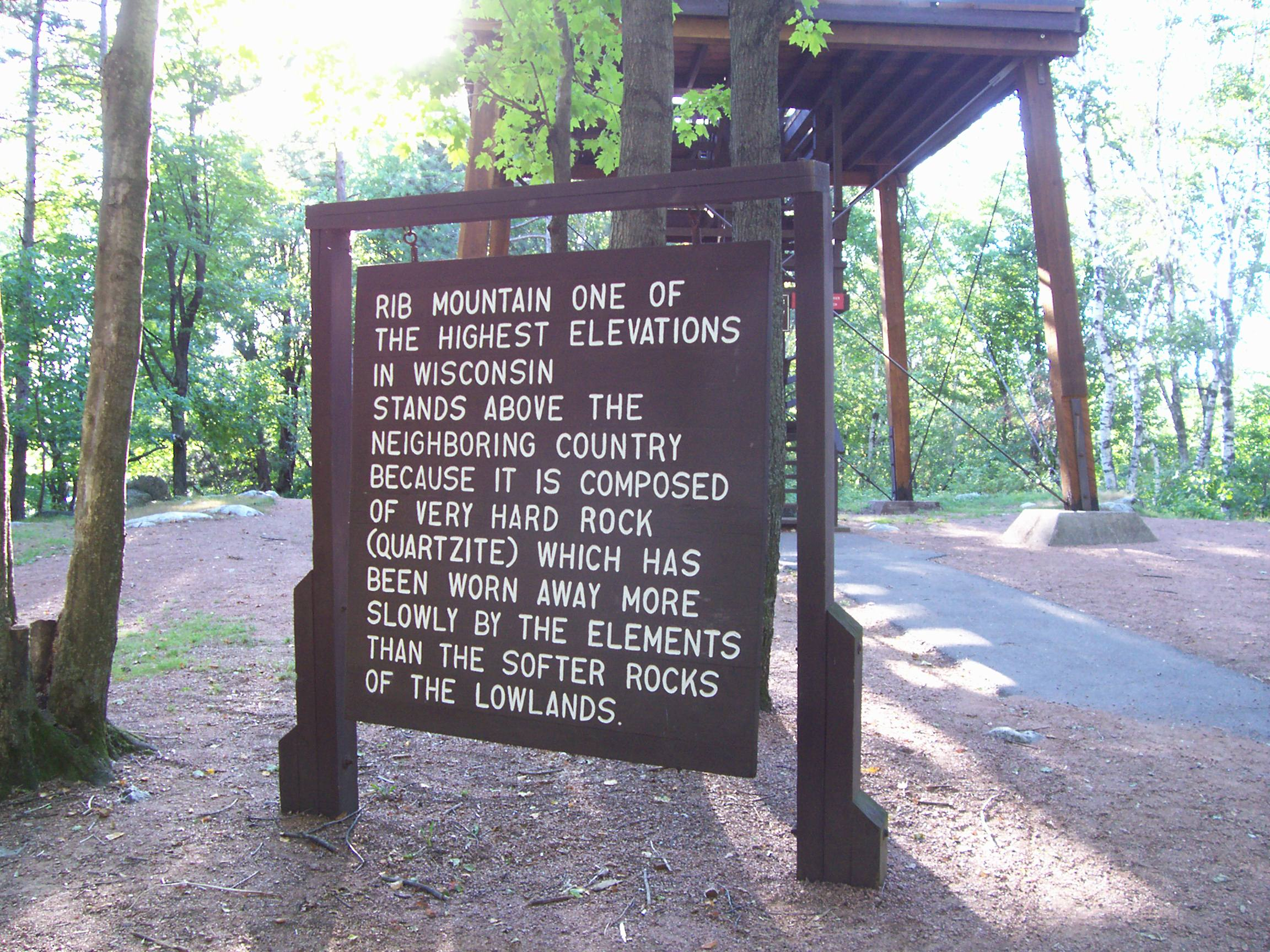
Information sign at summit

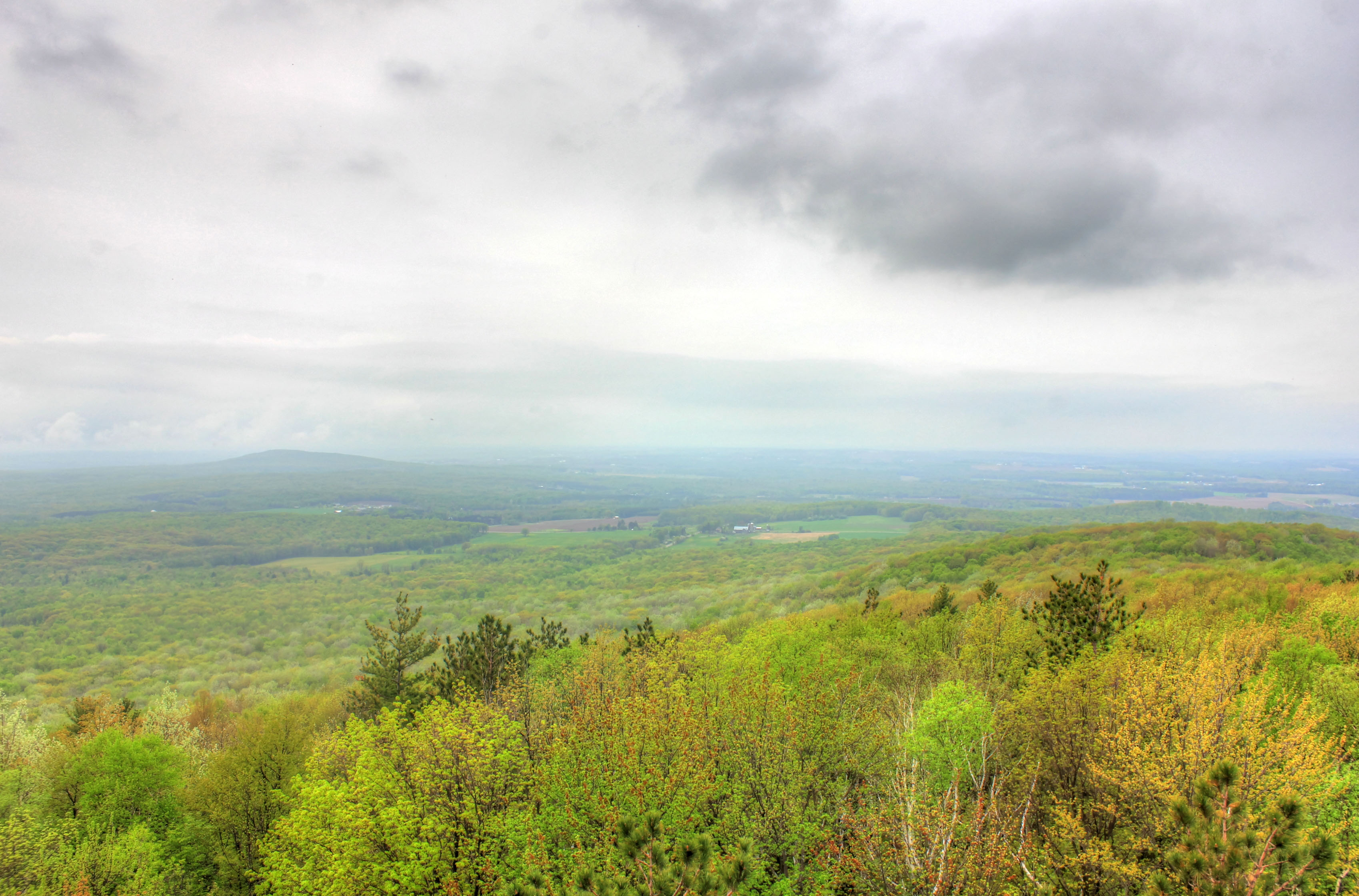
View from the summit
