= Moose Mountain (Minnesota) =

Mountain in Minnesota, United States

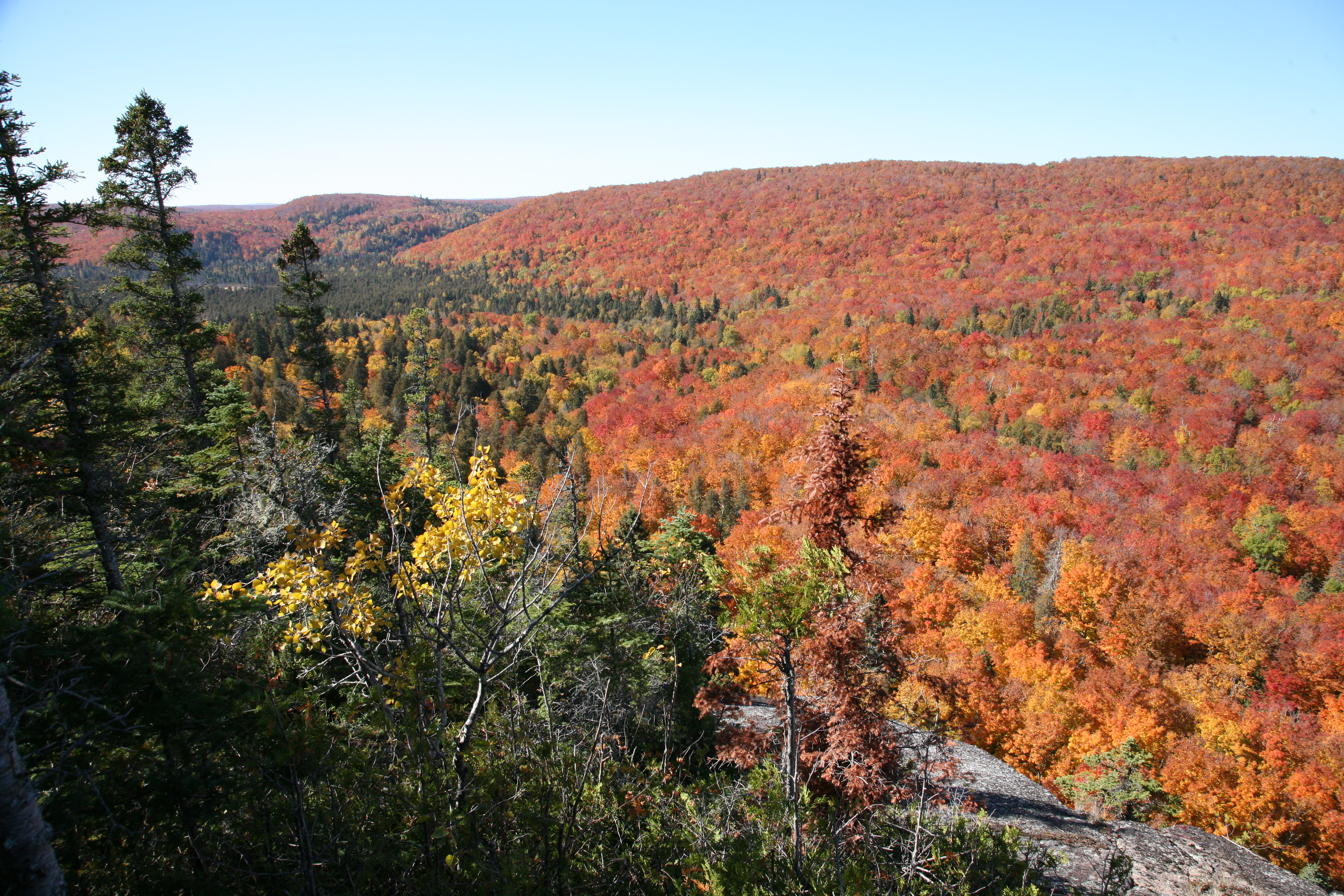
- Fall colors from top of Moose Mountain

Highest point
- Elevation: 1,689 ft (515 m)
- Coordinates: 47°39′N 90°44′W

Geography
- Location: Lutsen Township, Cook County, Minnesota, U.S.
- Parent range: Sawtooth Mountains

Climbing
- Easiest route: gondola lift, hike up ski trail

Moose Mountain is a peak in the Sawtooth Mountains of northeastern Minnesota in the United States. Its elevation is 1,689 feet (515 meters) above sea level. Located close to Lake Superior and reaching 1,087 feet (331 m) above its waters, it is part of the Lutsen Mountains ski resort.
