= Wausau School District =

School district in Wisconsin, United States

Coordinates: 44°57′12.6″N 89°37′19.0″W

Location
- 415 Seymour Street Wausau, Wisconsin; United States

District information
- Type: Public
- Motto: Educating for the future, one child at a time
- Established: 1861; 165 years ago
- Superintendent: Keith Hilts

Students and staff
- Enrollment: 8,836
- Colors: Purple, White, Gold

Other information
- Website: www.wausauschools.org

The Wausau School District is a public school district serving the Wausau metropolitan area, including the City of Wausau and the Towns of Rib Mountain, Wausau, Stettin, and Texas. It contains two high schools, two middle schools, 13 elementary schools, and one alternative high school.

== Boundary ==
The Wausau School District is entirely in Marathon County. It includes the majority of Wausau and all of Maine, as well as the census-designated place of Rib Mountain. Towns in the school district include all of Rib Mountain; most of Berlin; and parts of Stettin.

== Schools ==
=== Elementary schools ===
- Franklin Elementary
- Grant Elementary
- Hawthorn Hills Elementary
- Hewitt Texas Elementary
- Jefferson Elementary
- G.D. Jones Elementary
- Lincoln Elementary
- Maine Elementary
- Rib Mountain Elementary
- John Marshall Elementary
- Riverview Elementary
- South Mountain Elementary
- Stettin Elementary

=== Middle schools ===
- Horace Mann Middle School
- John Muir Middle School

Note: Could be changed due to other restrictions of the Wausau School District -Griffin Kleinschmidt

=== High schools ===
- Wausau East High School
- Wausau Engineering and Global Leadership (EGL) Academy
- Wausau West High School

EEA grades 6-12

=== Schools no longer existing ===
- Berlin School
- Irving School, built in 1883-1970. Now offices.
- Humboldt School, built in 1873–1874
- Washington School, built in 1889
- Franklin School, built in 1883 and used until 1970. Built across the street as Franklin Elementary School in 1966.
- Lincoln School, built in 1883
- Columbia School, built in 1885
- Longfellow School, built in 1894; now administrative offices for the school district
- Wausau High School and Wausau Senior High, built in 1898 and renovated in 1936, 1951, 1961, and 1986. The old building is now an apartment complex.
- Horace Mann Junior High, demolished in 1984, rebuilt on 13th and Sells Streets as Horace Mann Middle School in 1993.
- Marathon County Training School for Teachers, built in 1889; the University of Wisconsin–Marathon County now occupies the site.
- A.C. Kiefer Educational Center, now the home of Central Wisconsin Children's Theatre, Inc.

== Demographics ==
In 1981 there were 160 Hmong students in the Wausau School District. In the 1990s the Wausau School District received an increase of Hmong students, some of whom came from refugee camps and lacked formal education. In 1993 the Wausau School District began moving students, previously assigned to schools based on attendance zone, to a different scheme intended to equalize the ethnic proportions of Hmong and non-Hmong students. However it reverted to its previous scheme in 1994 after a negative reception from area parents.

By 2002, 12% of the Wausau population was Hmong, and 25% of the students at Wausau public schools were Hmong. Patti Kraus, who worked as a secretary for the WSD, stated in 2016 that the ethnic Hmong successfully adapted to American school life.

== Proposed Elementary School Merger ==
On April 23, 2020, the Wausau School District Board of Education proposed closing six elementary schools and shifting middle school students. Specifically, if passed by referendum during the November 3, 2020 general election, the number of elementary schools in the district would be cut in half from 14 to 7. The consolidation would save $2.6 million in recurring expenses and $7.9 million in one-time expenses for the district.

The following elementary schools would be closed under the proposal:

- Franklin Elementary
- Grant Elementary
- Hewitt-Texas Elementary
- Lincoln Elementary
- Maine Elementary
- Rib Mountain Elementary
- Wausau Area Montessori Charter

The following elementary schools would remain, but 5th and 6th graders in the district would be moved to the existing John Muir Middle School. 7th and 8th graders will be moved to Horace Mann Middle School.

- Stettin Elementary
- South Mountain Elementary
- John Marshall Elementary
- Riverview Elementary
- Thomas Jefferson Elementary
- Hawthorn Hills Elementary
- G.D. Jones Elementary
