= Surface lift =

Type of cable transport for snow sports

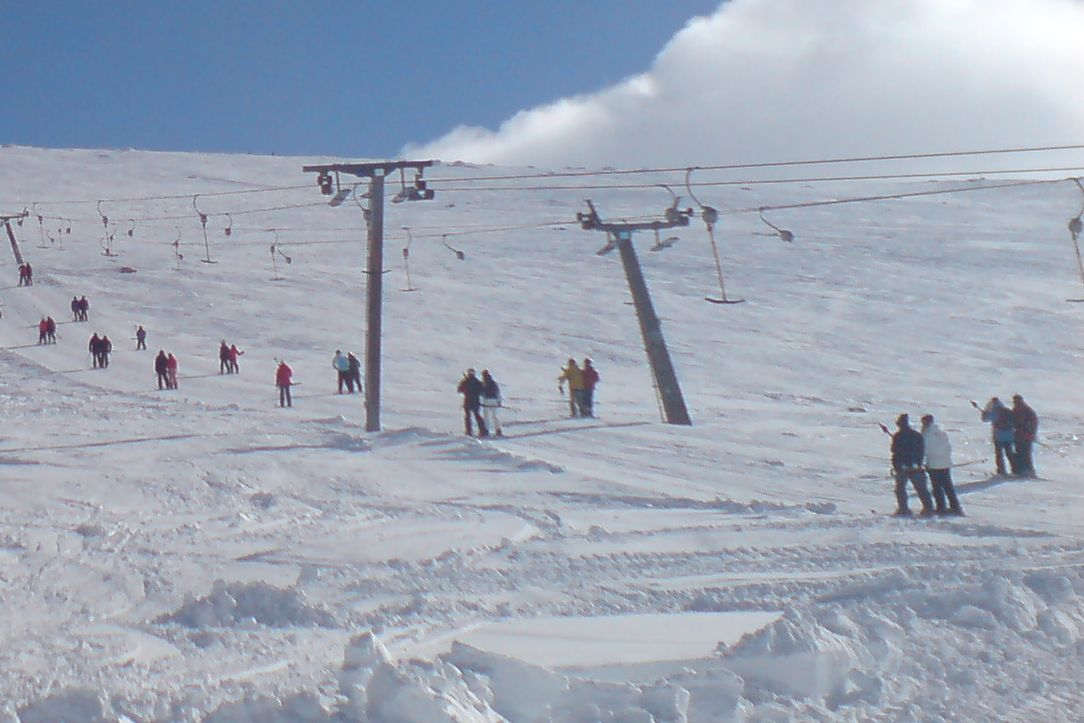
T-bar lift, a style of surface lift, in Åre, Sweden.

A surface lift is a type of cable transport for mountain sports in which skiers, snowboarders, or mountain bikers remain on the ground as they are pulled uphill. While they were once prevalent, they have been overtaken in popularity by higher-capacity and higher-comfort aerial lifts, such as chairlifts and gondola lifts. Today, surface lifts are most often found on beginner slopes, small ski areas, and peripheral slopes. They are also often used to access glacier ski slopes because their supports can be anchored in glacier ice due to the lower forces and realigned due to glacier movement.

Surface lifts have some disadvantages compared to aerial lifts: they require more passenger skill and may be difficult for some beginners (especially snowboarders, whose boards point at an angle different than the direction of travel) and children; sometimes they lack a suitable route back to the piste; the snow surface must be continuous; they can get in the way of skiable terrain; they are relatively slow in speed and have lower capacity.

Surface lifts have some advantages over aerial lifts: they can be exited before the lift reaches the top, they can often continue operating in wind conditions too strong for a chairlift, their lines are more flexible; being able to turn outwards of the cable loop, they require less maintenance and are much less expensive to install and operate.

== History ==
The first surface lift was built in 1908 by German Robert Winterhalder in Schollach, a quarter of Eisenbach, Hochschwarzwald, Germany, and started operations on 14 February 1908. A steam-powered toboggan tow, 950 feet (290 m) in length, was built in Truckee, California, in 1910. The first skier-specific tow in North America was apparently installed in 1933 by Alec Foster at Shawbridge in the Laurentians outside Montreal, Quebec.

The Shawbridge tow was quickly copied at Woodstock, Vermont, in New England, in 1934 by Bob and Betty Royce, proprietors of the White Cupboard Inn. Their tow was driven by the rear wheel of a Ford Model A. Wallace "Bunny" Bertram took it over for the second season, improved the operation, renamed it from Ski-Way to Ski Tow, and eventually moved it to what became the eastern fringe of Vermont's major southern ski areas, a regional resort still operating as Saskadena Six. Their relative simplicity made tows widespread and contributed to an expansion of the sport in the United States and Europe. Before tows, only people willing to walk uphill could ski. Suddenly relatively non-athletic people could participate, greatly increasing the appeal of the sport. By 1937, more than 100 tow ropes were operating in the U.S.

== Rope tow ==
A rope tow consists of a cable or rope running through a bullwheel (large horizontal pulley) at the bottom and one at the top, powered by an engine at one end.

In the simplest case, a rope tow is where passengers grab hold of a rope and are pulled along while standing on their skis or snowboards and are pulled up a hill. The grade of this style of tow is limited by passenger grip strength and the fact that sheaves (pulleys that support the rope above the ground) cannot be used.

=== Handle tow ===
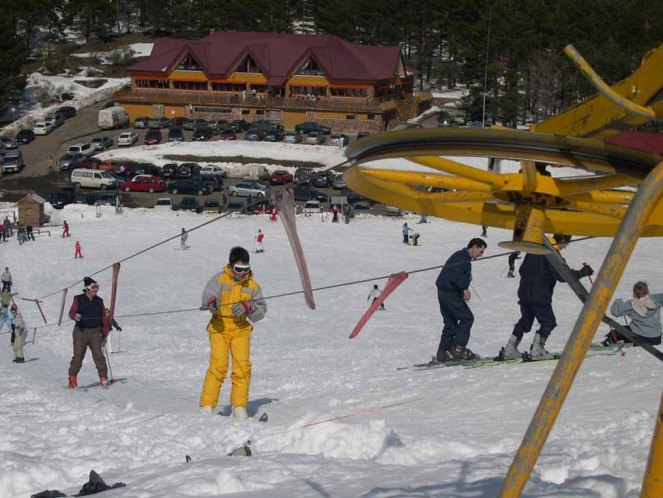
Handle tow in Valle del Sol

A development of the simple rope tow is the handle tow (or pony lift), where plastic or metal handles are permanently attached to the rope. These handles are easier to grip than a rope, making the ski lift easier to ride.

=== Nutcracker tow ===
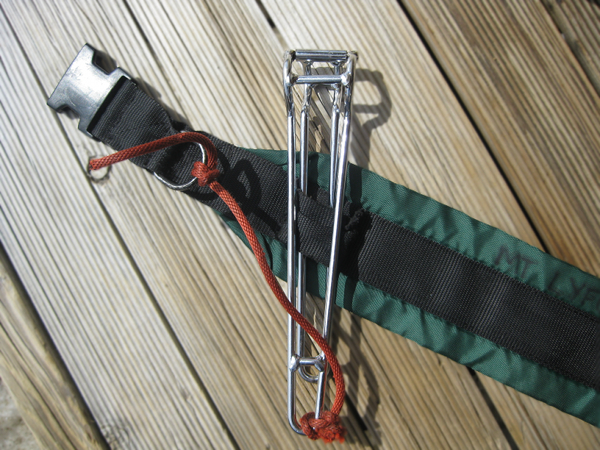
Nutcracker and belt

Steeper, faster and longer tows require a series of pulleys to support the rope at waist height and hence require the use of some sort of "tow gripper". Several were designed and used in the 1930s and 40s, but the most successful was the "nutcracker" attached to a harness around the hips. To this is attached a clamp, much like the nutcracker from which it derives its name, which the rider attaches to the rope. This eliminates the need to hold on to the rope directly. This system was used on many fields worldwide from the 1940s, and remains popular at 'club fields', especially in New Zealand. This type of ski lift is often referred to as a nutcracker tow.

== J-bar, T-bar, and platter lift ==
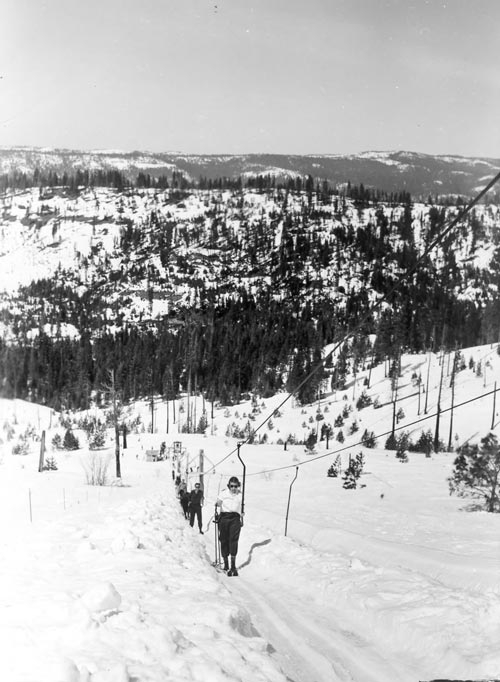
A J-bar lift

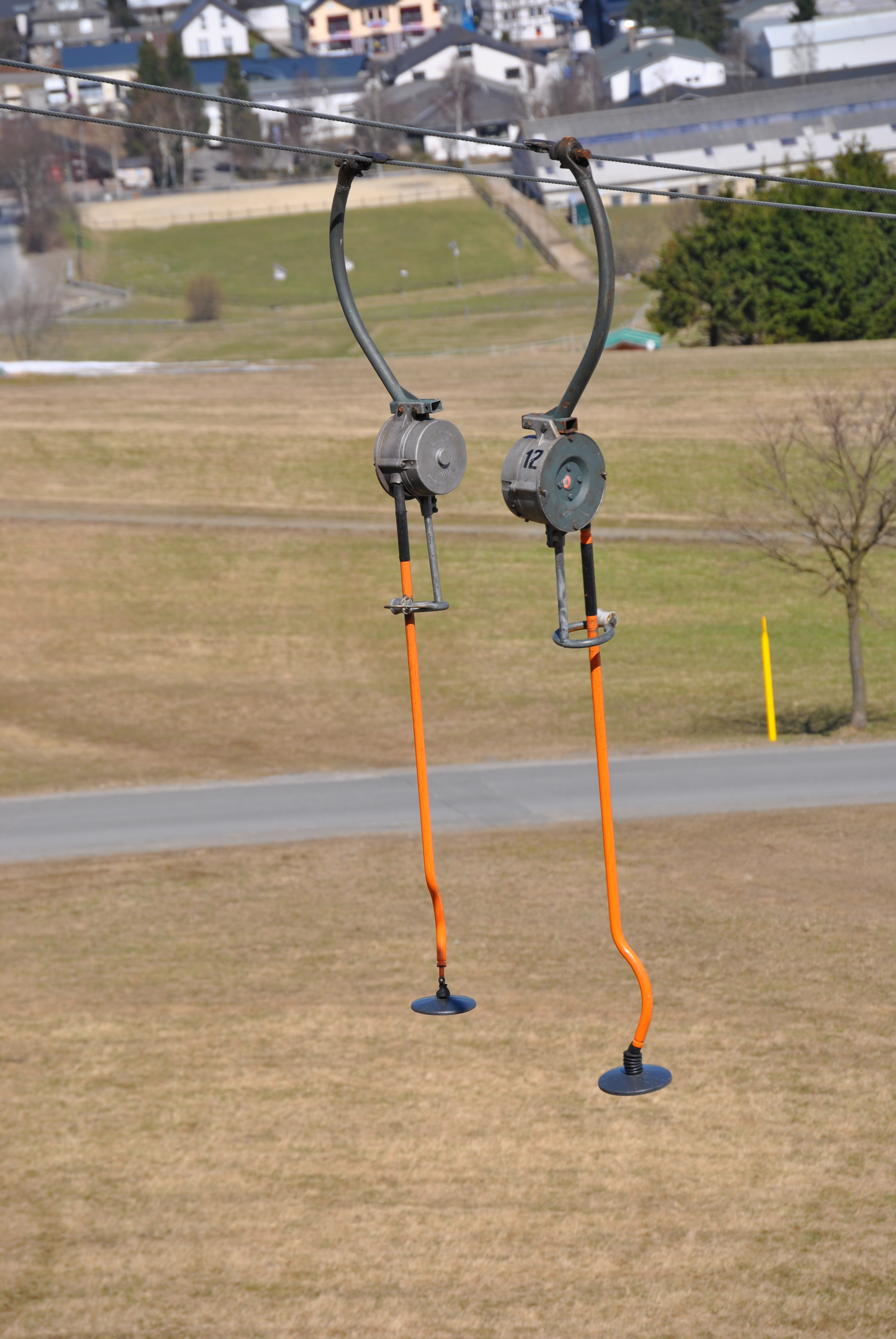
Two hangers of a platter lift

J-bar, T-bar, and platter lifts are employed for low-capacity slopes in large resorts and small local areas. These consist of an aerial cable loop running over a series of wheels, powered by an engine at one end. Hanging from the rope are a series of vertical recoiling cables, each attached to a horizontal J- or T-shaped bar – which is placed behind the skier's buttocks or between the snowboarder's legs – or a plastic button or platter that is placed between the skier's legs. Snowboarders place the platter behind the top of their front leg or in front of their chest under their rear arm and hold it in position with their hands. These pull the passengers uphill while they ski or snowboard across the ground.

Platter lifts are often referred to as button lifts, and may occasionally feature rigid poles instead of recoiling cables.

The modern J-bar and T-bar mechanism was invented in 1934 by the Swiss engineer Ernst Constam, with the first lift installed in Davos, Switzerland. J-bars were installed in other Swiss and French resorts, and starting in 1935 in New Hampshire and Australia. A J-bar was installed at Rib Mountain (now Granite Peak Ski Area), Wisconsin, in 1937. The Ski Hoist at Charlotte Pass in Australia dates from 1938.

The first T-bar lift in the United States was installed in 1940 at the Pico Mountain ski area. It was considered a great improvement over the rope tow.

J-bars are no longer used at most ski areas. Some operators have combined T-bar and platter lifts, attaching both types of hanger to the cable, giving skiers and snowboarders a choice. Hangers designed to tow sledges uphill are installed on some slopes by operators, and some operators convert hangers in the summer to tow cyclists uphill.

=== Detachable platter or Poma lift ===
A variant of the platter lift is the detachable surface lift, commonly known as a “Poma lift” or "Pomalift", after Poma, the company which introduced them. Unlike most other platter lifts, which are similar to T-bars with the stick attached to a spring box by a retractable cord, Poma lifts have a detachable grip to the tow cable with the button connected to the grip by a semi-rigid pole. Platters return to the bottom station, detach from the cable, and are stored on a rail until a skier slides the platter forwards to use it. Most detachable surface lifts operate at speeds of around 4 m/s (13 ft/s; 8.9 mph; 14 km/h), while platters and T-bars can operate up to 3.0 m/s (9.8 ft/s; 6.7 mph; 11 km/h), although are generally slower. When the grip attaches to the cable, the passenger's acceleration is lessened by the spring-loaded pole.

== Conveyor lift ==
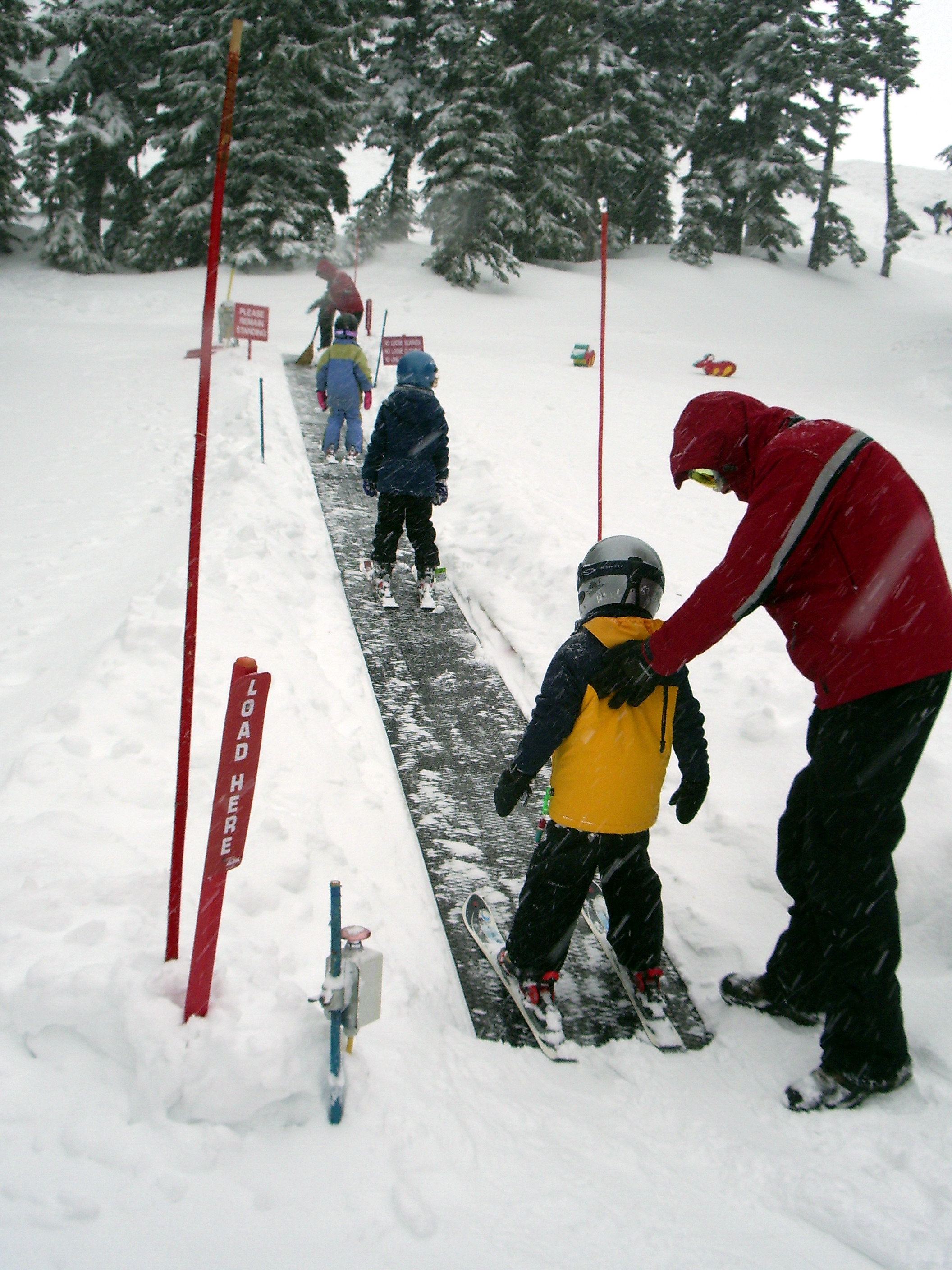
A magic carpet in use, operated by two attendants

A conveyor lift is a conveyor belt that works similar to an airport moving sidewalk to transport skiers. It is sometimes referred to as a magic carpet. At the top, the belt pushes the passengers onto the snow and they slide away. Conveyor lifts are geared towards beginners and families. These lifts are limited to shallow grades because they depend on friction between the belt surface and the skis or board to keep riders in place. Their slow speed, limited distance, and capacity generally confines them to beginner and novice areas.
