= Rib Mountain (CDP), Wisconsin =

Census-designated place in Wisconsin, United States

Rib Mountain
- CDP
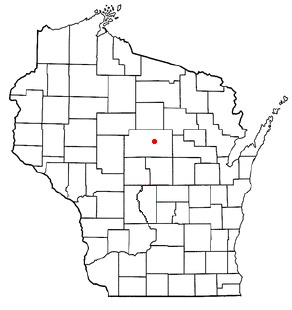
- Location of Rib Mountain, Wisconsin
- Coordinates: 44°55′44″N 89°39′57″W
- Country: United States
- State: Wisconsin
- County: Marathon
- Named for: Rib Mountain

Area
  - Total: 13.1 sq mi (33.8 km^{2})
  - Land: 12.1 sq mi (31.4 km^{2})
  - Water: 0.93 sq mi (2.4 km^{2})

Population (2020)
  - Total: 6,061
  - Density: 500/sq mi (193/km^{2})
- Time zone: UTC-6 (Central (CST))
  - Summer (DST): UTC-5 (CDT)
- Area codes: 715 & 534

Rib Mountain is a census-designated place (CDP) in the town of Rib Mountain in Marathon County, Wisconsin, United States. The population was 6,061 at the 2020 census.

The community is named for Rib Mountain.

== Geography ==
Rib Mountain is located at 44°55′43″N 89°39′57″W (44.928768, -89.665872).

According to the United States Census Bureau, the CDP has a total area of 33.8 km^{2} (13.1 sq mi), of which 31.4 km^{2} (12.1 sq mi) is land and 2.4 km^{2} (0.93 sq mi) (6.98%) is water.

== Demographics ==
Historical population
| Census | Pop. | Note | %± |
|---|---|---|---|
| 2010 | 5,651 | | — |
| 2020 | 6,061 | | 7.3% |
U.S. Decennial Census

As of the census of 2000, there were 6,059 people, 2,211 households, and 1,782 families residing in the CDP. The population density was 193.0 people/km^{2} (500 people/mi^{2}). There were 2,278 housing units at an average density of 72.6 units/km^{2} (188 units/mi^{2}). The racial makeup of the CDP was 96.06% White, 0.17% Black or African American, 0.23% Native American, 2.79% Asian, 0.23% from other races, and 0.53% from two or more races. Hispanic or Latino of any race were 0.61% of the population.

There were 2,211 households, out of which 36.9% had children under the age of 18 living with them, 74.0% were married couples living together, 4.5% had a female householder with no husband present, and 19.4% were non-families. 15.4% of all households were made up of individuals, and 6.4% had someone living alone who was 65 years of age or older. The average household size was 2.71 and the average family size was 3.03.

In the CDP, the population was spread out, with 26.5% under the age of 18, 5.9% from 18 to 24, 29.1% from 25 to 44, 27.4% from 45 to 64, and 11.0% who were 65 years of age or older. The median age was 39 years. For every 100 females, there were 102.8 males. For every 100 females age 18 and over, there were 98.9 males.

The median income for a household in the CDP was $58,866, and the median income for a family was $63,881. Males had a median income of $42,432 versus $26,947 for females. The per capita income for the CDP was $28,066. About 0.5% of families and 2.0% of the population were below the poverty line, including none of those under age 18 and 2.8% of those age 65 or over.

== Education ==
It is in the Wausau School District.
