= Central Wisconsin Airport =

Airport located in Mosinee, Wisconsin

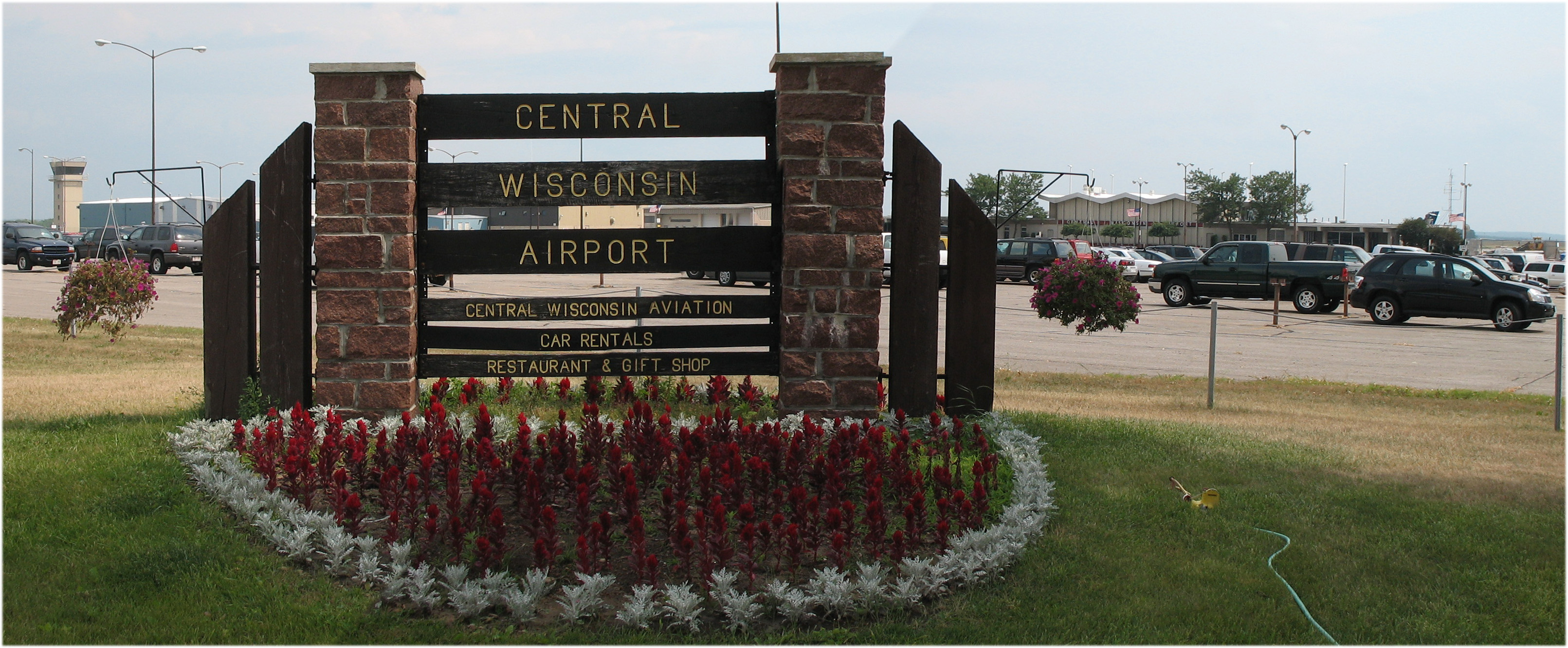
- IATA: CWA; ICAO: KCWA; FAA LID: CWA

Summary
- Airport type: Public
- Owner: Marathon and Portage counties
- Operator: Central Wisconsin Joint Airport Board
- Serves: Kronenwetter, Wisconsin; Stevens Point, Wisconsin; Wausau, Wisconsin
- Location: Mosinee, Wisconsin
- Opened: October 1969
- Time zone: CST (UTC−06:00)
  - Summer (DST): CDT (UTC−05:00)
- Elevation AMSL: 1,277 ft (389 m)
- Coordinates: 44°46′40″N 089°39′57″W
- Website: www.fly-cwa.org

Maps
- FAA airport diagram

- Location of airport in Wisconsin CWA (the United States)
- Interactive map of Central Wisconsin Airport

Runways
Direction	Length		Surface
Direction	ft	m	Surface
8/26	7,723	2,354	Concrete
17/35	6,501	1,982	Concrete

Statistics (12 months ending August 2026 ^{except where noted})
- Passenger volume: 176,540
- Departing passengers: 89,390
- Scheduled flights: 1,912
- Cargo (lb.): 289k
- Aircraft operations (2022): 13,592
- Based aircraft (2024): 27
- Source: Federal Aviation Administration, BTS

Central Wisconsin Airport (IATA: CWA, ICAO: KCWA, FAA LID: CWA), referred to as "C-Way", is a public airport located 3 nautical miles (5.6 km; 3.5 mi) southeast of the central business district of Mosinee, in Marathon County, Wisconsin, United States. It is owned by Marathon County and Portage County. It is included in the Federal Aviation Administration (FAA) National Plan of Integrated Airport Systems for 2025–2029, in which it is categorized as a non-hub primary commercial service facility. It is the fifth busiest of eight commercial airports in Wisconsin in terms of passengers served.

The airport serves a large swath of Central and North Central Wisconsin including cities such as Marshfield, Stevens Point, Wausau and Wisconsin Rapids, as well as several tourism communities. It is 10 miles (16 km) south-southeast of Granite Peak Ski Area, located in Rib Mountain State Park.

== Facilities and aircraft ==
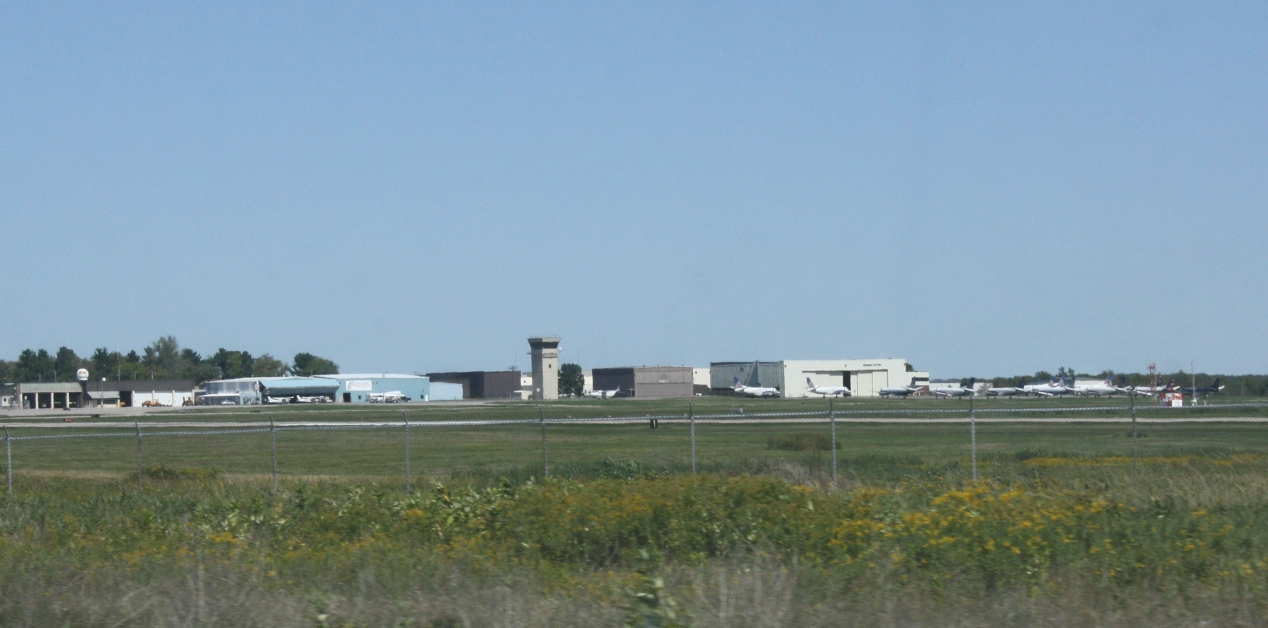
Panoramic view of facilities

Central Wisconsin Airport covers an area of 1,852 acres (749 ha) at an elevation of 1,277.2 feet (389.3 m) above mean sea level. It contains two concrete paved runways: 8/26 measuring 7,723 x 150 ft (2,354 x 46 m) and 17/35 measuring 6,501 x 150 ft (1,982 x 46 m). For the 12-month period ending December 31, 2022, the airport had 13,592 operations, an average of 37 aircraft operations per day: 56% scheduled commercial / air taxi, 43% general aviation and almost 1% military. In August 2024, there were 27 aircraft based at this airport: 17 single-engine, 3 multi-engine, 5 jet, 1 helicopter and 1 glider aircraft.

CWA has T-hangars for lease, or an individual or corporation can construct their own hangar.

The airport is home to a maintenance base for Endeavor Air which operates on behalf of Delta Air Lines as Delta Connection.

== History ==
Central Wisconsin Airport opened in 1969 as a centralized commercial airport between Wausau and Stevens Point which each had their own commercial airfields prior to that time. North Central Airlines served the new airport with flights to Chicago, Milwaukee, and Minneapolis/St. Paul, some flights making stops at other cities within Wisconsin. North Central previously served Wausau and Stevens Point individually and was able to upgrade their service from prop aircraft to Douglas DC-9 jets with the opening of CWA. North Central merged with Southern Airways to become Republic Airlines in 1979 which was then merged into Northwest Airlines in 1986. Northwest merged into Delta Air Lines in 2010 which continues to serve CWA by way of feeder carriers operating as Delta Connection. After airline deregulation was passed in 1978, several other carriers including Skyway Airlines, operating on behalf of Midwest Express, have served CWA. American Airlines and United Airlines also began new service to Chicago by way of their feeder carriers operating as American Eagle and United Express. Avelo Airlines briefly served the airport, flying Boeing 737-800 aircraft to Orlando. American Eagle and Delta Connection continue to serve the airport. Starting on October 25, 2026, United Express will serve the airport again, after having previously ended service on January 3, 2022.

In 1997, the terminal was modernized with five new gates, and the highway access was reconstructed.

On September 1, 2012, the airport began a $10 million modernization program, moving the security checkpoints and enlarging the ticket counters to reduce passenger congestion. The airport gained a geothermal energy system that reduces utility bills, providing all but 20% of its heating and cooling requirements.

== Airlines and destinations ==
=== Passenger ===
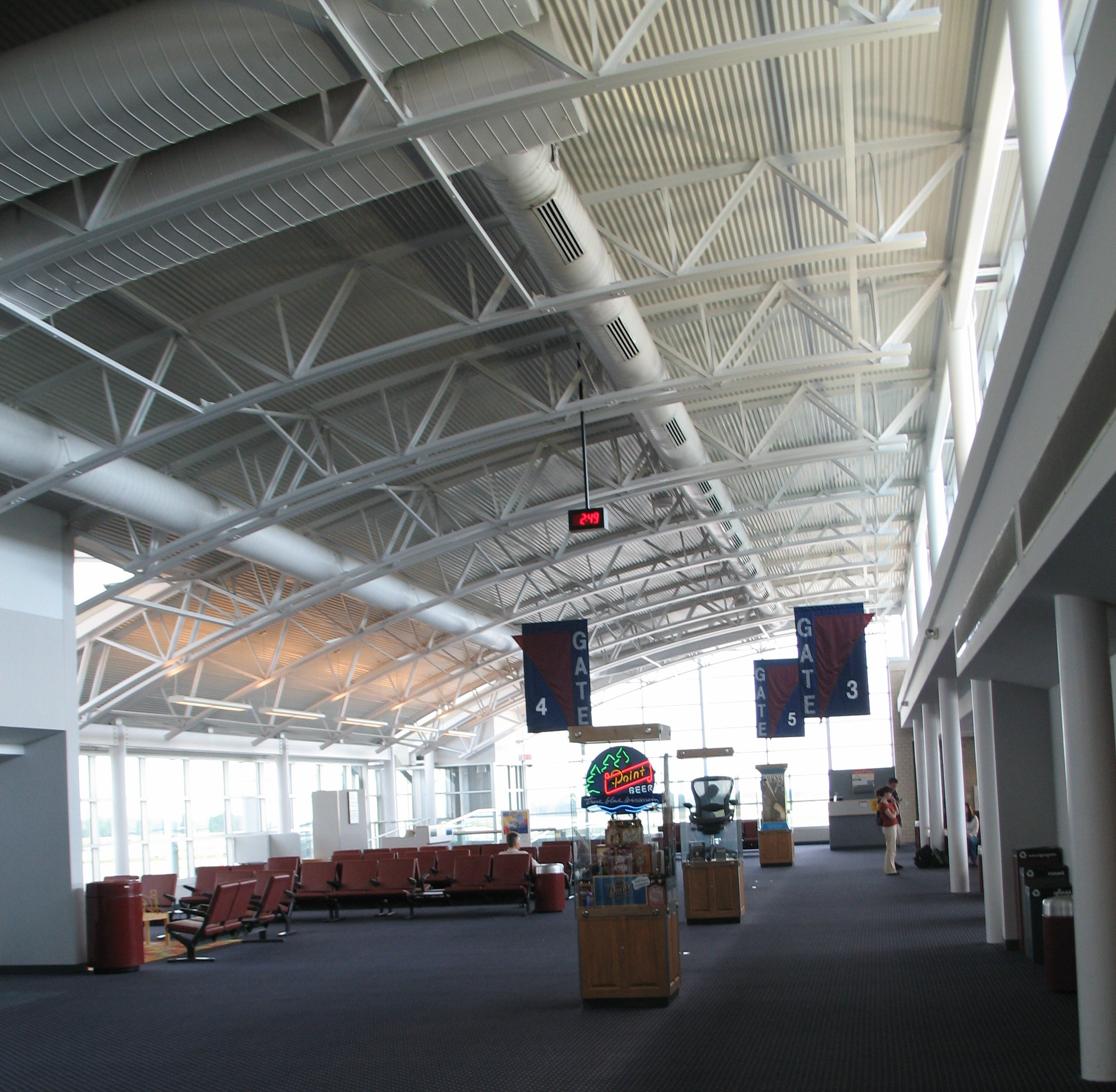
Gate area before renovation

Airlines	Destinations
American Eagle	Chicago–O'Hare
Delta Connection	Minneapolis/St. Paul

Destinations map
All passenger destinations from Central Wisconsin Airport (CWA)
Red = Year-round destination
Green = Seasonal destination
Blue = Future destination
Purple = Route ending

=== Statistics ===
Carrier shares (September 2025 – August 2026)
Carrier	Passengers (arriving and departing)
Envoy	90,660(51.35%)
Endeavor Air	85,720(48.56%)

Busiest domestic routes from CWA (September 2025 – August 2026)
Rank	Airport	Passengers	Carriers
1	Chicago (O'Hare), Illinois	46,260	American
2	Minneapolis/St. Paul, Minnesota	43,130	Delta

=== Cargo operations ===
Airlines	Destinations
FedEx Feeder	Madison, Milwaukee
Freight Runners Express	Milwaukee, Oshkosh, Rhinelander
PACC Air	Rhinelander

== Ground transportation ==
As of 2023, there is no public transit service to the airport. Metro Ride serves the Wausau area, however, no service is provided to the airport.

== See also ==
- List of airports in Wisconsin
- Metro Ride
