= Rib Mountain, Wisconsin =

Village of Rib Mountain
- Village
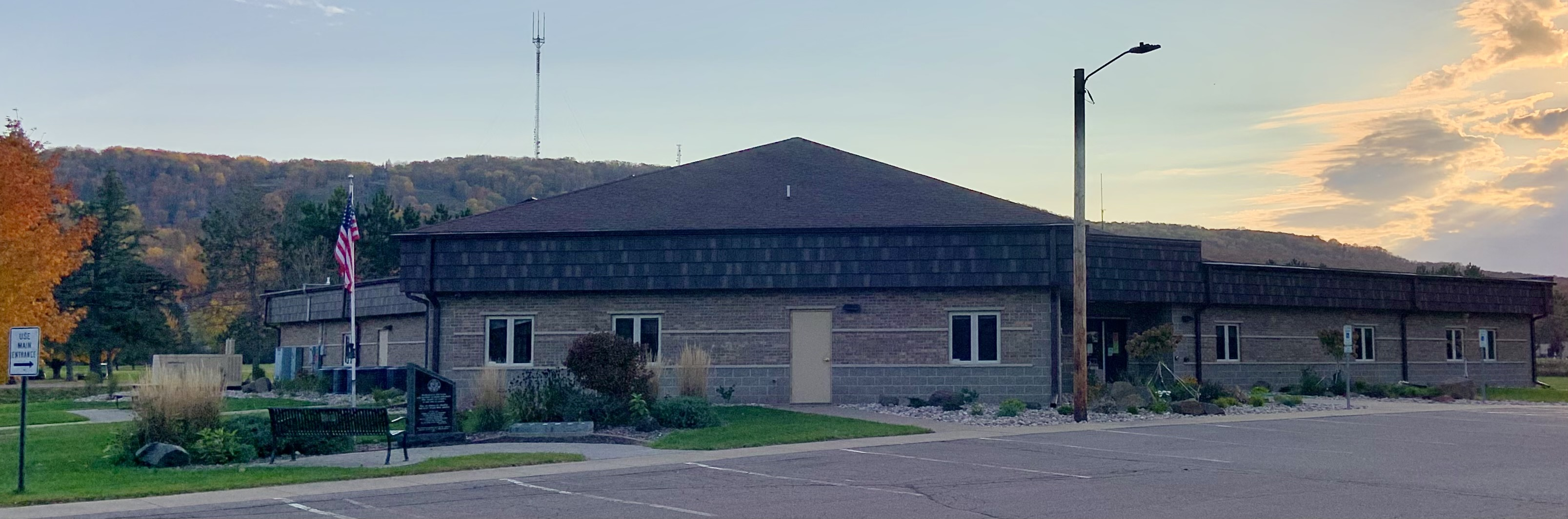
- Village hall

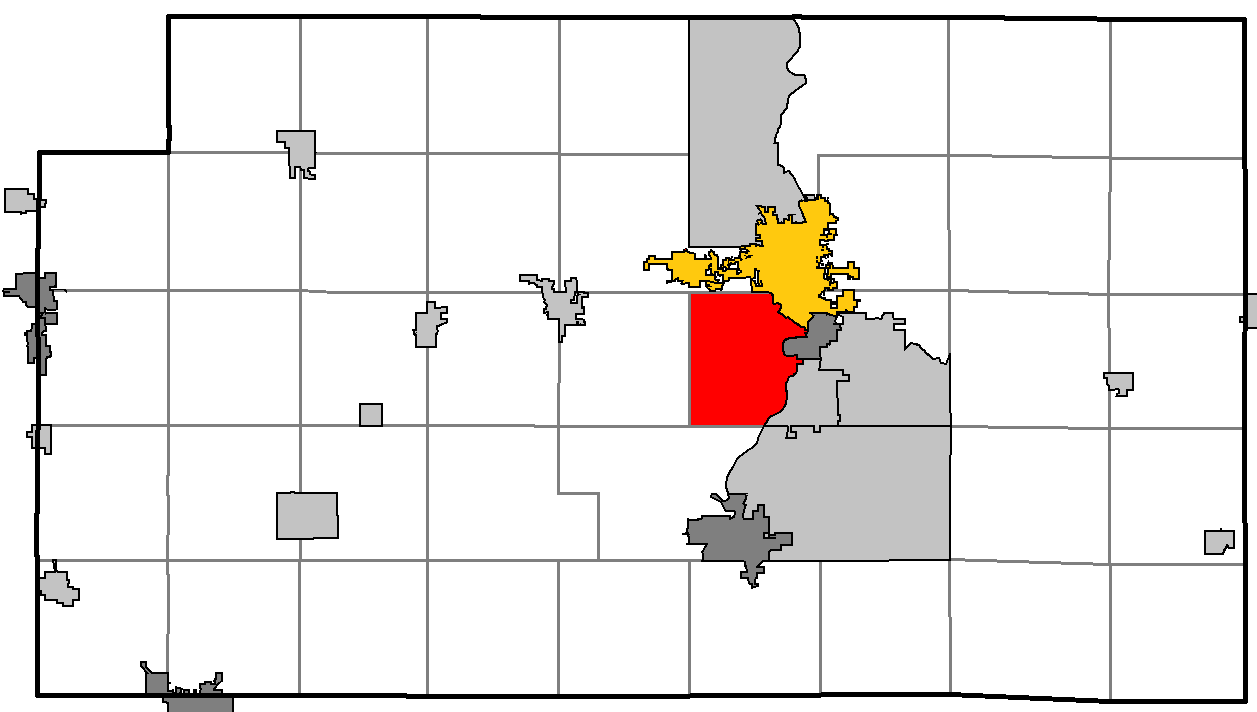
- Location of the Village of Rib Mountain
- Coordinates: 44°54′42″N 89°40′20″W
- Country: United States
- State: Wisconsin
- County: Marathon
- Established: 1930

Area
  - Total: 25.6 sq mi (66.3 km^{2})
  - Land: 24.6 sq mi (63.7 km^{2})
  - Water: 1.0 sq mi (2.6 km^{2})
- Elevation: 1,227 ft (374 m)

Population (2020)
  - Total: 7,313
  - Density: 297/sq mi (115/km^{2})
- Time zone: UTC-6 (Central (CST))
  - Summer (DST): UTC-5 (CDT)
- Area codes: 715 & 534
- FIPS code: 55-67325
- GNIS feature ID: 1584018
- Website: www.ribmountainwi.gov

Rib Mountain is a village located in Marathon County, Wisconsin, United States. The population was 7,313 at the 2020 census. A suburb of Wausau, it is part of the Wausau Metropolitan Statistical Area. The census-designated place of Rib Mountain is located in the village.

== History ==
Originally part of the Town of Weston, the area was established as the town of Erickson (in honor of George Erickson, the town chairman) in 1905. Later renamed Flieth, the town was renamed the Town of Rib Mountain in 1930. It is named after the nearby hill of Rib Mountain. In 2023, its residents voted 1,194 to 104 to become a village, renaming to the Village of Rib Mountain.

== Geography ==
According to the United States Census Bureau, the village has a total area of 25.6 square miles (66.3 km^{2}), of which 24.6 square miles (63.7 km^{2}) is land and 1.0 square miles (2.6 km^{2}), or 3.91%, is water.

== Demographics ==
Historical population
Census	Pop.	Note	%±
2000	7,556		—
2010	6,825		−9.7%
2020	7,313		7.2%
U.S. Decennial Census

At the 2000 census, there were 7,556 people, 2,697 households and 2,206 families residing in the village. The population density was 307.3 per square mile (118.6/km^{2}). There were 2,769 housing units at an average density of 112.6 per square mile (43.5/km^{2}). The racial makeup was 96.49% White, 0.12% Black or African American, 0.21% Native American, 2.50% Asian, 0.20% from other races, and 0.48% from two or more races. 0.48% of the population were Hispanic or Latino of any race.

There were 2,697 households, of which 39.5% had children under the age of 18 living with them, 75.4% were married couples living together, 4.2% had a female householder with no husband present, and 18.2% were non-families. 14.3% of all households were made up of individuals, and 5.5% had someone living alone who was 65 years of age or older. The average household size was 2.78 and the average family size was 3.08.

27.8% of the population were under the age of 18, 5.9% from 18 to 24, 29.7% from 25 to 44, 26.8% from 45 to 64, and 9.8% who were 65 years of age or older. The median age was 38 years. For every 100 females, there were 101.5 males. For every 100 females age 18 and over, there were 99.3 males.

The median household income was $61,294 and the median family income was $66,337. Males had a median income of $45,667 and females $29,071. The per capita income was $27,768. About 0.4% of families and 1.7% of the population were below the poverty line, including none of those under age 18 and 2.5% of those age 65 or over.

== Transportation ==
=== Airport ===
The Central Wisconsin Airport (KCWA) serves the village, the county and surrounding communities with both scheduled commercial jet service and general aviation services.

== Notable people ==
- Charles Zarnke, Wisconsin politician
