= Rib Mountain =

Mountain in Wisconsin, US

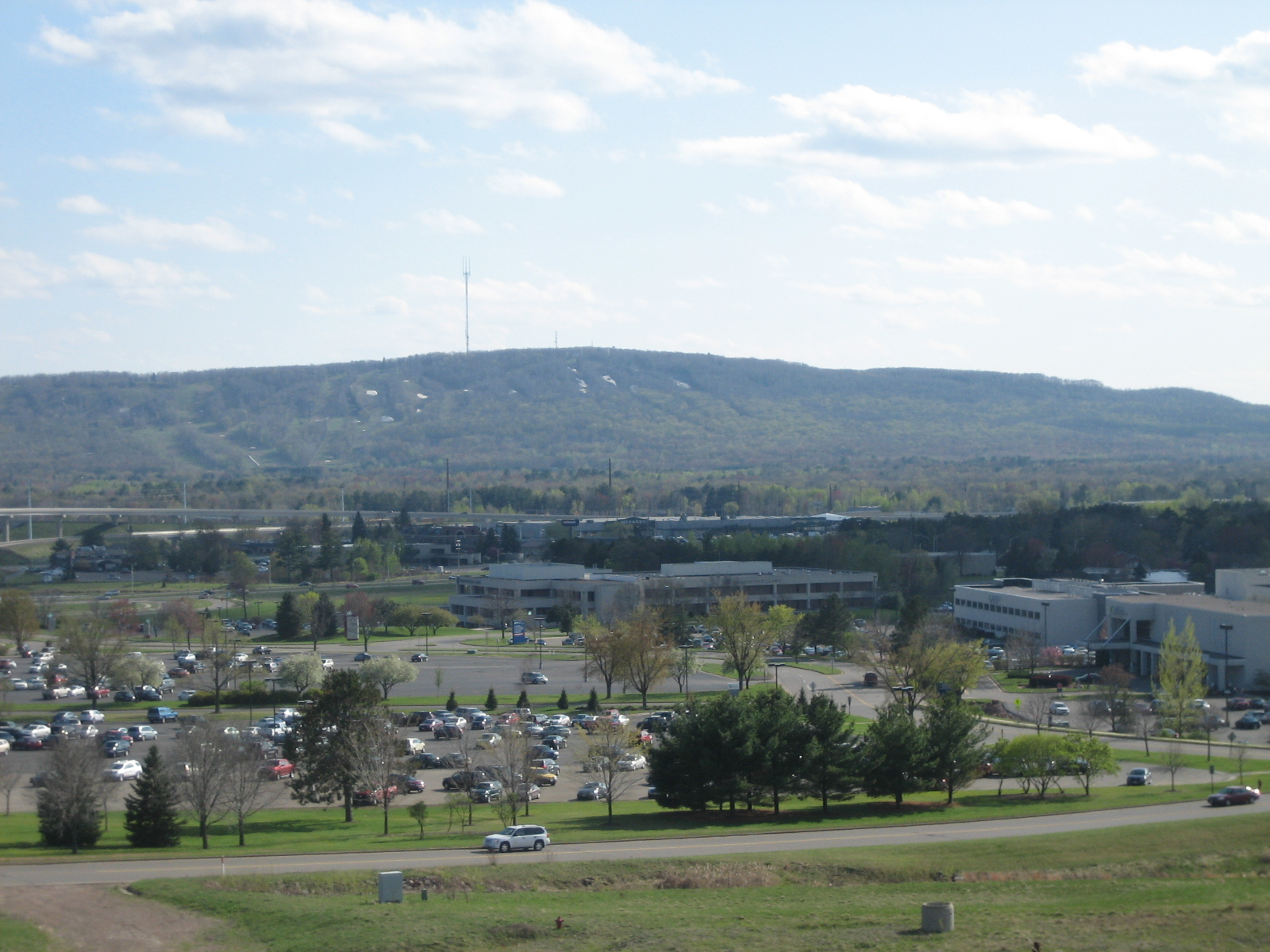
- Rib Mountain from the ridge north of Wausau Hospital

Highest point
- Elevation: 1,924 ft (586 m)
- Prominence: 670 ft (200 m)
- Coordinates: 44°55′15″N 89°41′43″W

Geography
- Location: Marathon County, Wisconsin, U.S.
- Topo map: USGS Wausau West

Geology
- Rock age: 1.5B years
- Mountain type: monadnock

Rib Mountain, also known as Rib Hill, is located in the village of Rib Mountain 4 miles (6.4 km) southwest of downtown Wausau. Composed of quartzite covered with a softer syenite sheath, it was intruded about 1.5 billion years ago. Rib Mountain is home to the Rib Mountain State Park and the Granite Peak Ski Area, which opened in 1938 and now offers 65 runs

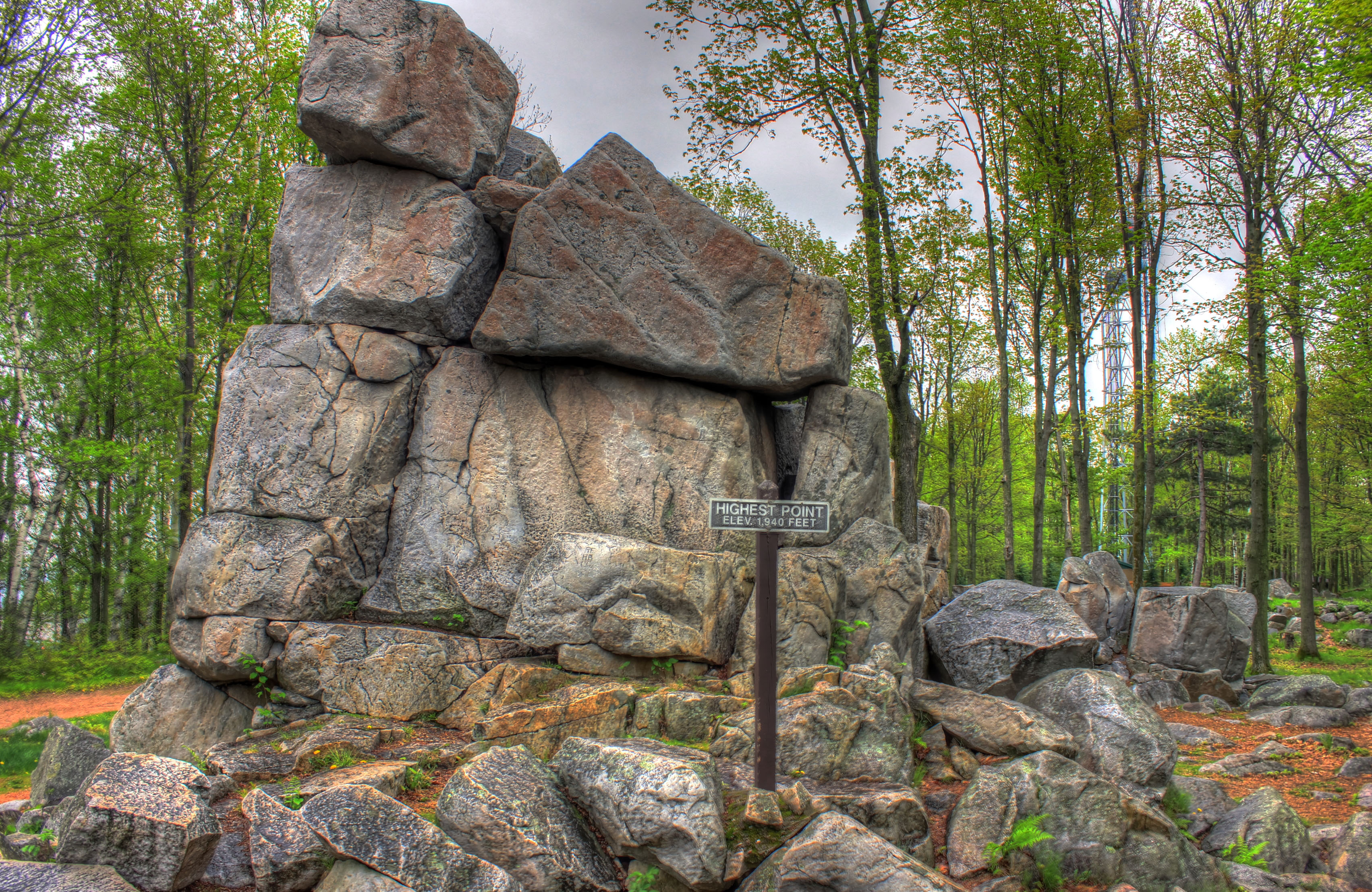
The highest point on Rib Mountain

Rib Mountain is almost 4 miles (6.4 km) long and rises to 1,924 feet (586 m) above sea level and 670 feet (200 m) above the local terrain, making it the fourth-highest point in Wisconsin. The Rib River and Little Rib River are nearby. It is on the west side of the Wisconsin River, just west of Interstate 39 and south of Highway 29. The nearby Wausau Downtown Airport at an elevation of 1,201 ft (366 m), is located just 3 mi (4.8 km) to the east.

The peak is the site of transmitters for radio and TV stations in the Wausau area and is the namesake for Wisconsin Public Television's WHRM-TV (Channel 20) and WHRM-FM (90.9), Wisconsin Public Radio's news and classical network station for the area. It also makes room for the transmitter at the top for WDEZ.
