= Lutsen Township, Cook County, Minnesota =

Lutsen Township, Minnesota
- Township
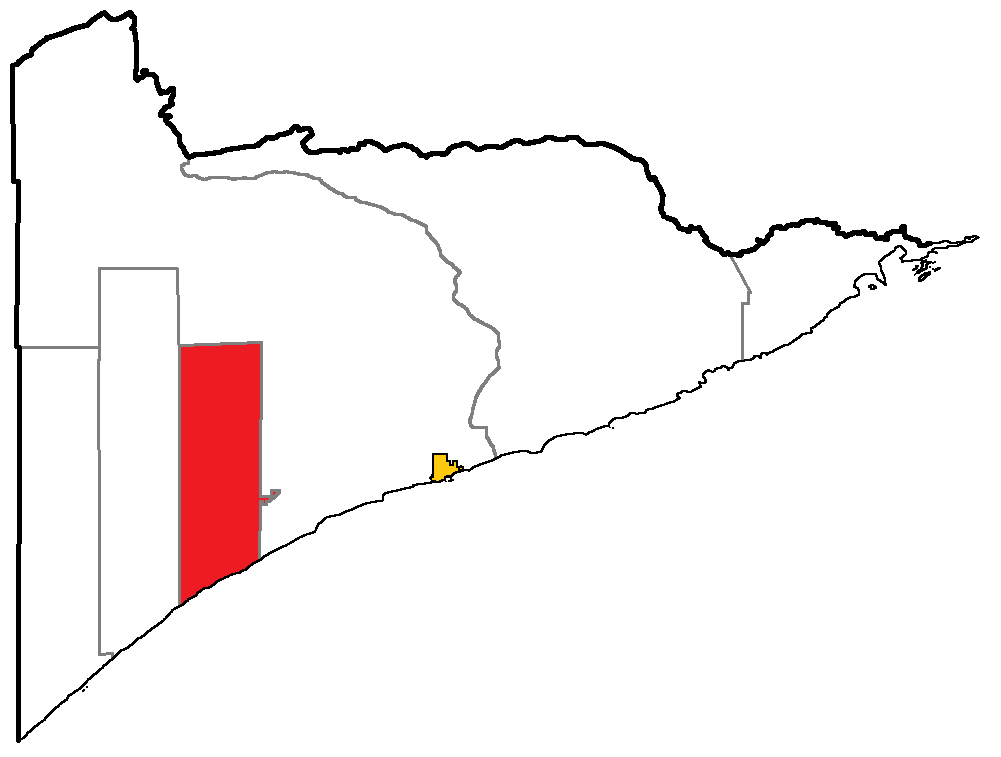
- Location of Lutsen Township in Cook County, Minnesota
- Coordinates: 47°43′20″N 90°41′57″W
- Country: United States
- State: Minnesota
- County: Cook

Area
  - Total: 105.8 sq mi (273.9 km^{2})
  - Land: 97.9 sq mi (253.5 km^{2})
  - Water: 7.9 sq mi (20.4 km^{2})
- Elevation: 1,624 ft (495 m)

Population (2020)
  - Total: 537
  - Estimate (2021): 542
  - Density: 5.49/sq mi (2.12/km^{2})
- Time zone: UTC-6 (CST)
  - Summer (DST): UTC-5 (CDT)
- ZIP codes: 55604, 55612
- Area code: 218
- FIPS code: 27-38550
- GNIS feature ID: 0664839
- Website: lutsentownship.com

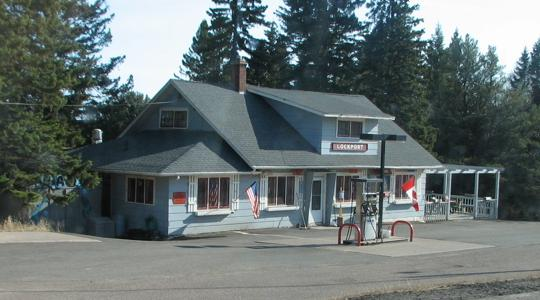
Lockport Marketplace at Lutsen

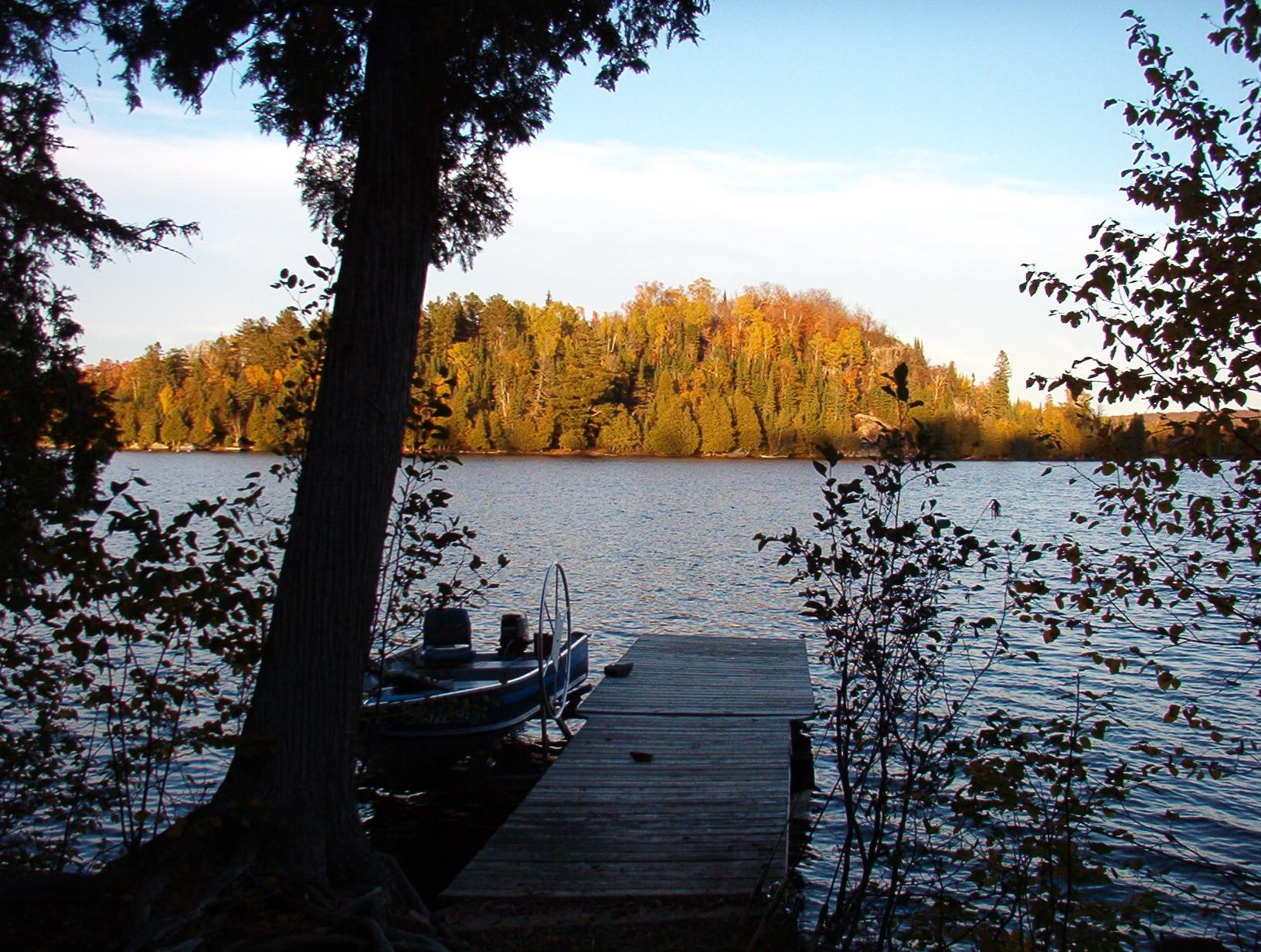
Caribou Lake

Lutsen Township is one of the three townships of Cook County, Minnesota, United States. The population was 537 at the 2020 census. The unincorporated community of Lutsen is located within the township. The township was named after the town of Lützen, which is known for the Battle of Lützen (1632).

Lutsen Mountains ski resort, the townships's largest employer, is located in the township.

== Geography ==
According to the United States Census Bureau, the township has a total area of 105.8 square miles (273.9 km^{2}), of which, 97.9 square miles (253.5 km^{2}) of it is land and 7.9 square miles (20.4 km^{2}) of it (7.43%) is water.

The township is located on the North Shore of Lake Superior. Much of the township is within the Poplar River watershed, which empties into Lake Superior within the township.

Minnesota Highway 61 serves as a main route in the township.

The community of Lutsen is located 18 miles southwest of the city of Grand Marais; and 65 miles northeast of the city of Two Harbors.

Cascade River State Park is nearby. The Superior Hiking Trail runs through the township.

Lutsen Township is located within the Superior National Forest.

== Demographics ==
Historical population
Census	Pop.	Note	%±
1990	240		—
2000	360		50.0%
2010	415		15.3%
2020	537		29.4%
2021 (est.)	542		0.9%
U.S. Decennial Census; 2020 Census

As of the census of 2000, there were 360 people, 172 households, and 104 families residing in the township. The population density was 3.7 inhabitants per square mile (1.4/km^{2}). There were 611 housing units at an average density of 6.2/sq mi (2.4/km^{2}). The racial makeup of the township was 96.94% White, 0.56% African American, 0.83% Native American, and 1.67% from two or more races.

There were 172 households, out of which 23.3% had children under the age of 18 living with them, 53.5% were married couples living together, 4.1% had a female householder with no husband present, and 39.0% were non-families. 34.3% of all households were made up of individuals, and 5.8% had someone living alone who was 65 years of age or older. The average household size was 2.09 and the average family size was 2.65.

In the township the population was spread out, with 18.9% under the age of 18, 3.6% from 18 to 24, 26.4% from 25 to 44, 40.0% from 45 to 64, and 11.1% who were 65 years of age or older. The median age was 46 years. For every 100 females, there were 106.9 males. For every 100 females age 18 and over, there were 111.6 males.

The median income for a household in the township was $44,167, and the median income for a family was $50,917. Males had a median income of $35,313 versus $22,083 for females. The per capita income for the township was $29,249. None of the population or families were below the poverty line.

== Weather and climate ==
Lutsen Minnesota has a cold humid continental climate, just short of a Subarctic climate.

Climate data for Lutsen, Minnesota
Month	Jan	Feb	Mar	Apr	May	Jun	Jul	Aug	Sep	Oct	Nov	Dec	Year
Mean daily maximum °F (°C)	22.2 (−5.4)	25.7 (−3.5)	34.8 (1.6)	46.7 (8.2)	56.4 (13.6)	63.6 (17.6)	70.3 (21.3)	70.5 (21.4)	62.4 (16.9)	52.1 (11.2)	38.5 (3.6)	26.6 (−3.0)	47.5 (8.6)
Mean daily minimum °F (°C)	3.9 (−15.6)	7.2 (−13.8)	19.0 (−7.2)	30.5 (−0.8)	38.5 (3.6)	44.6 (7.0)	52.1 (11.2)	53.8 (12.1)	47.1 (8.4)	37.7 (3.2)	25.5 (−3.6)	10.9 (−11.7)	30.9 (−0.6)
Average rainfall inches (mm)	0.9 (23)	0.7 (18)	1.4 (36)	1.9 (48)	2.8 (71)	3.5 (89)	3.5 (89)	3.3 (84)	3.6 (91)	2.5 (64)	1.6 (41)	1.1 (28)	26.4 (670)
Average snowfall inches (cm)	15.2 (39)	8.1 (21)	8.1 (21)	2.2 (5.6)	0.2 (0.51)	0.0 (0.0)	0.0 (0.0)	0.0 (0.0)	0.0 (0.0)	0.4 (1.0)	3.8 (9.7)	13.3 (34)	50.8 (129)
