= Sawtooth Mountains (Minnesota) =

Highland region in Minnesota, United States

Coordinates: 47°40′N 90°42′W

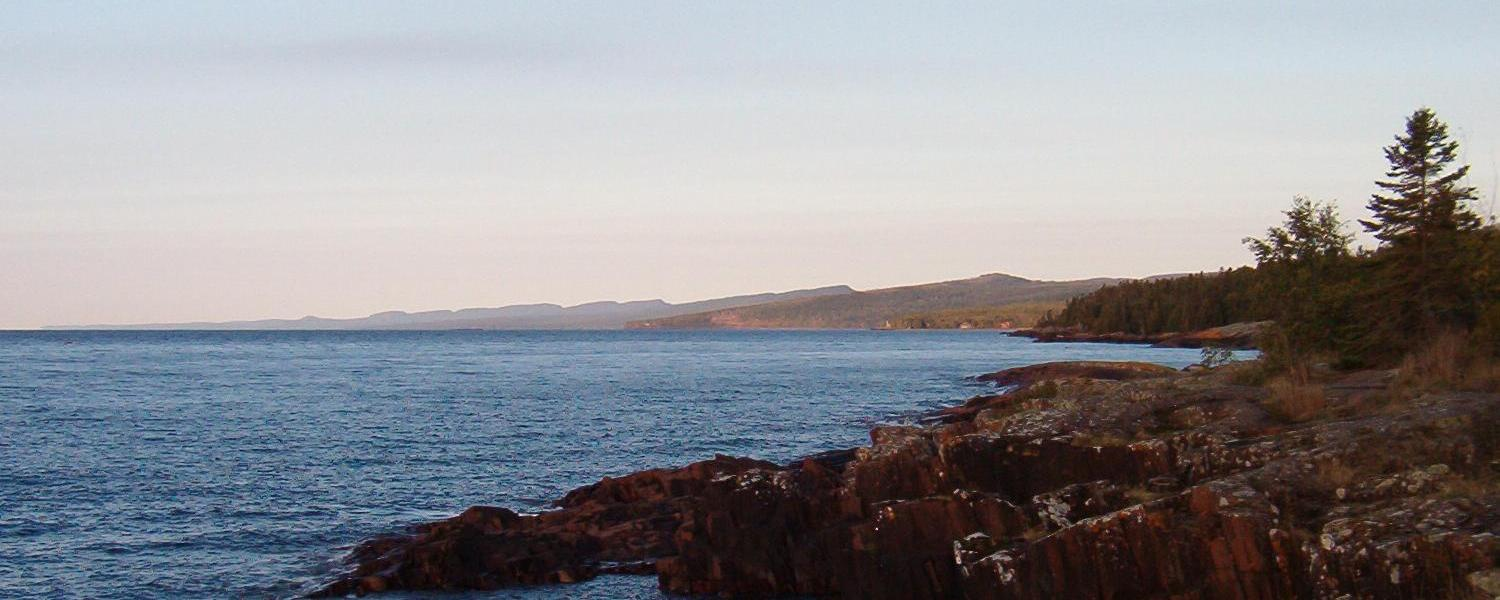
The Sawtooth Mountains on the shore of Lake Superior, looking west by southwest from Grand Marais, Minnesota

The Sawtooth Mountains are a range of small mountains on the North Shore of Lake Superior in the U.S. state of Minnesota, extending about 30 miles (48 km) from Carlton Peak near Tofte on the west to Grand Marais on the east.

== Description ==
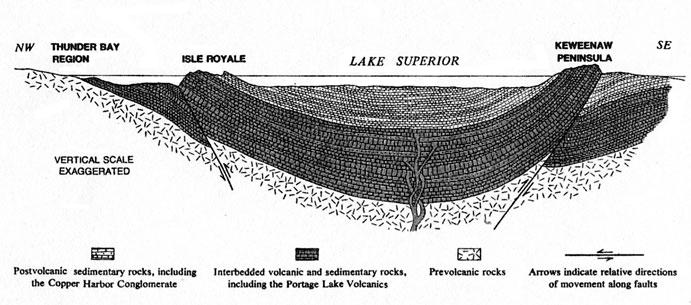
Cross-section of the Lake Superior basin east of the Sawtooths, showing the tilted strata of volcanic rock which form the mountains.

The Sawtooth Mountains are part of the North Shore Highlands, an area of rugged topography along the North Shore of Lake Superior in central North America. The Sawtooths rise from the lake at angles between 8 and 20 degrees and drop off steeply on their north sides. They received their name as a result of their relatively uniform size, angles, and regularity of spacing; seen from Lake Superior "the visible crest line thus presents a remarkable profile, resembling the teeth of an immense saw."

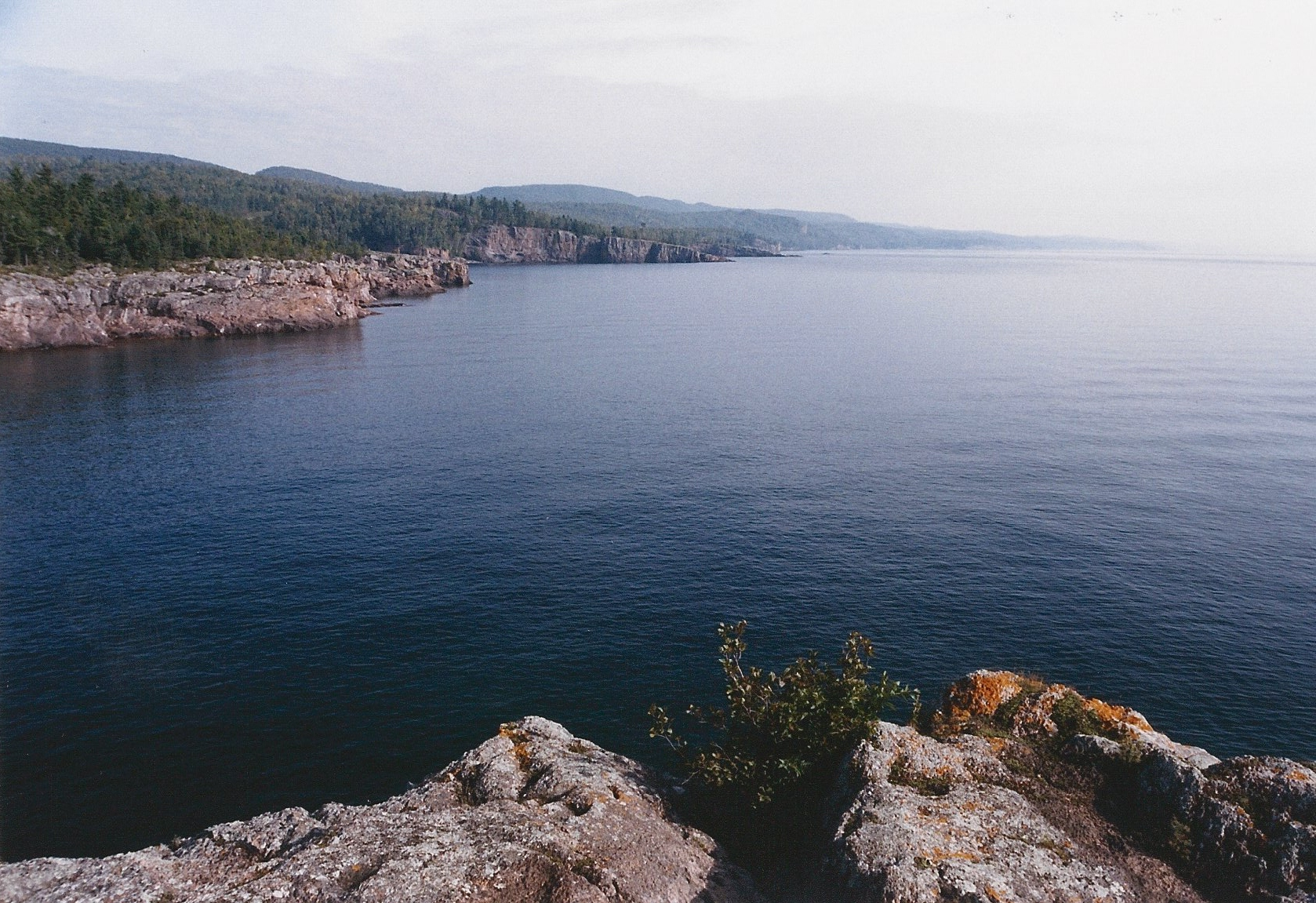
Sawtooth Mountains and Lake Superior shore looking east-northeast from Palisade Head.

From the west, rising from the Temperance River, major prominences are Carlton Peak above Temperance River State Park, Leveaux Mountain, Oberg Mountain immediately across the Onion River, Moose Mountain, Eagle Mountain at Lutsen, peaks along a ridge above Cascade River State Park, Murphy Mountain, and Sawtooth Bluff above Grand Marais.

== Etymology ==
The name Sawtooth Mountains comes from the fact that, when viewed from a distance, the peaks resemble the teeth of a saw because of their uniform size, height, and angles.

== Tourism ==
In addition to the uplands, the Sawtooths are home to many rivers, waterfalls, and parks. Wildlife is abundant and includes eagles, hawks, deer, moose, wolves, and many small mammals. Some of the notable sites include:

- Cascade River State Park
- Judge C.R. Magney State Park
- Superior Hiking Trail
- Superior National Forest
- Temperance River State Park

Lutsen Mountains Ski Resort is located in the Sawtooths, just northwest of the town of Lutsen; the area includes Moose Mountain, one of the higher peaks of the range, and Eagle Mountain (to be distinguished from the other Eagle Mountain in Cook County, the highest peak in the state, and located well inland from the lakeshore).

== Sources ==
- Ojakangas, Richard W.; Charles L. Matsch (1982). Minnesota's Geology. Illus. Dan Breedy. Minneapolis, Minnesota: University of Minnesota Press. ISBN 0-8166-0953-5.
- Upham, Warren (2001) Minnesota Place Names, A Geographical Encyclopedia, Third Edition; MHS Press; ISBN 0-87351-396-7.
