= Duluth Complex =

Rock formation in Minnesota

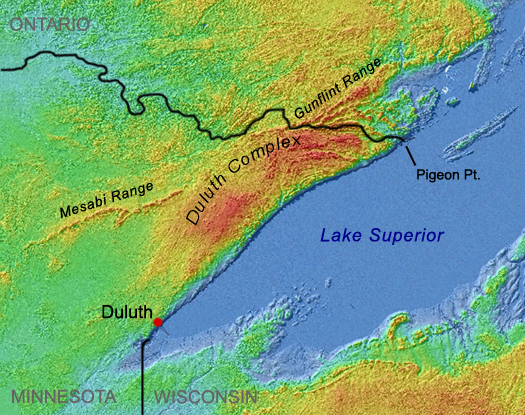
Shaded-relief image showing the Duluth Complex arcing from Duluth to Pigeon Point, interrupting and splitting the Mesabi and Gunflint Ranges

The Duluth Complex, the related Beaver Bay Complex, and the associated North Shore Volcanic Group are rock formations which comprise much of the basement bedrock of the northeastern part of the U.S. state of Minnesota in central North America. The Duluth and Beaver Bay complexes are intrusive rocks formed about 1.1 billion years ago during the Midcontinent Rift; these adjoin and are interspersed with the extrusive rocks of the North Shore Volcanic Group produced during that same geologic event. These formations are part of the Superior Upland physiographic region of the United States, which is associated with the Laurentian Upland of the Canadian Shield, the core of the North American Craton.

== Location ==
The Duluth Complex includes much of Minnesota's Arrowhead Region north of Lake Superior. From the west near Duluth, Minnesota, it arcs north and northeast to about 48° north latitude south of Knife Lake, proceeds east at that latitude some five to twenty kilometers distant from and south of the Canada–US border to about 90° west longitude where it joins the border at the Pigeon River, and thence runs east near and along the border to Lake Superior. The Duluth and Beaver Bay complexes lie south of this line.

Near Lake Superior these intrusive formations intermingle in a complex mosaic with the rocks of the associated North Shore Volcanics, which also are relics of the Midcontinent rifting event. The Duluth and Beaver Bay Complexes extend a short distance under Lake Superior south of the present lakeshore, but in most places along and near that shore their southern reaches are overlain by the North Shore Volcanic Group.

== Formation ==
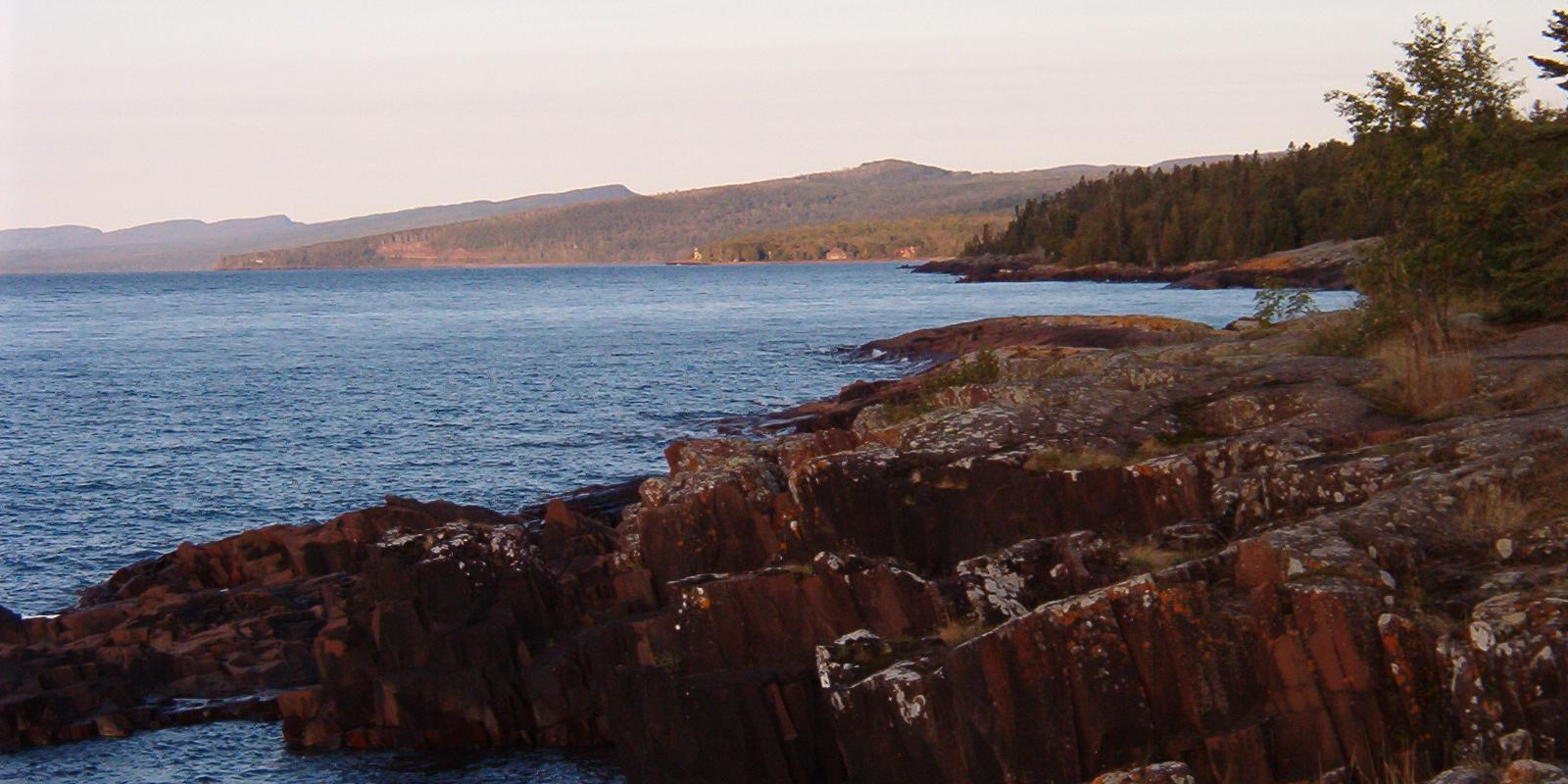
The Sawtooth Mountains rising from Lake Superior

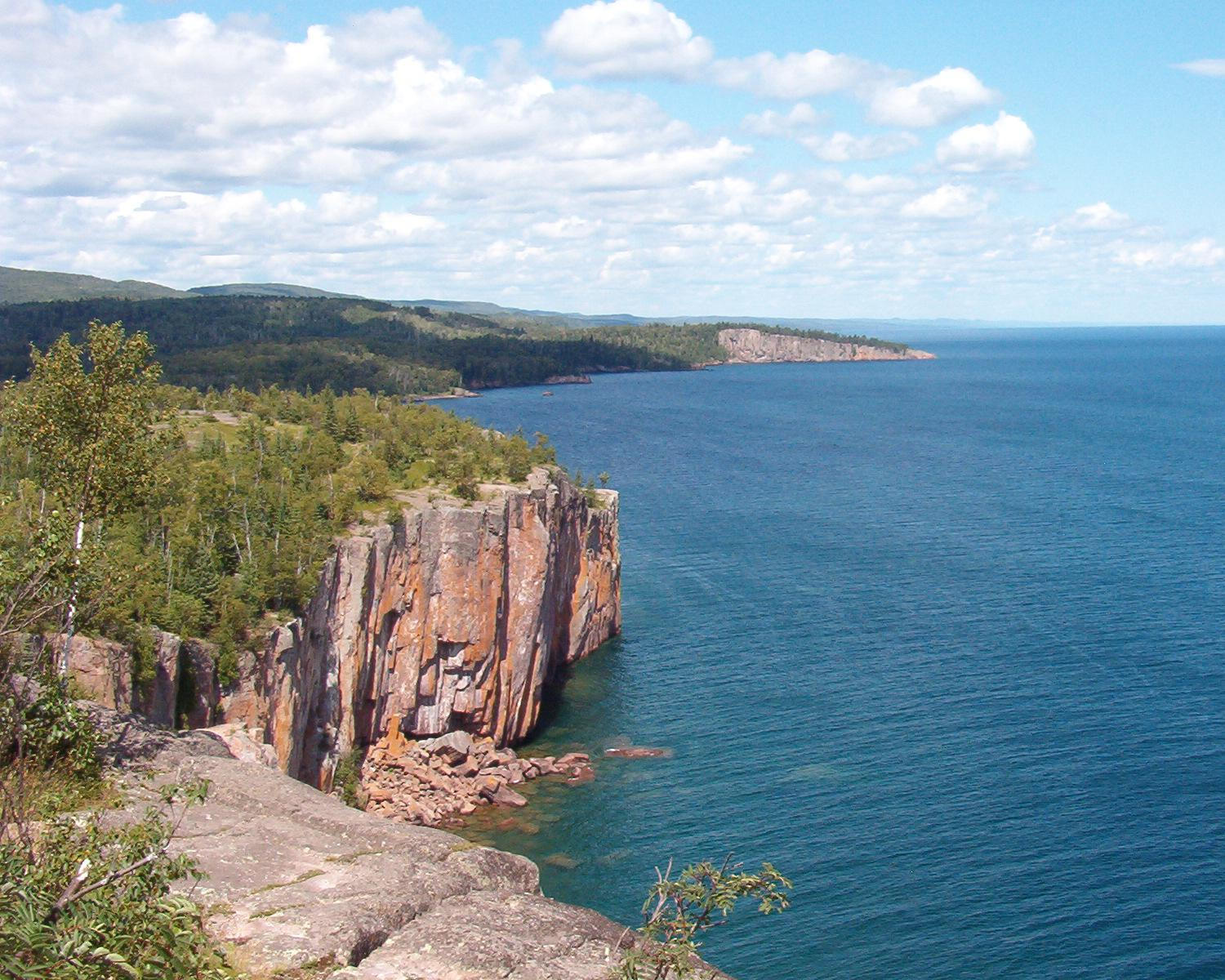
North Shore Volcanics: Palisade Head (foreground) and Shovel Point (midground), both rhyolitic extrusions of the Midcontinent Rift; Sawtooth Mountains on horizon

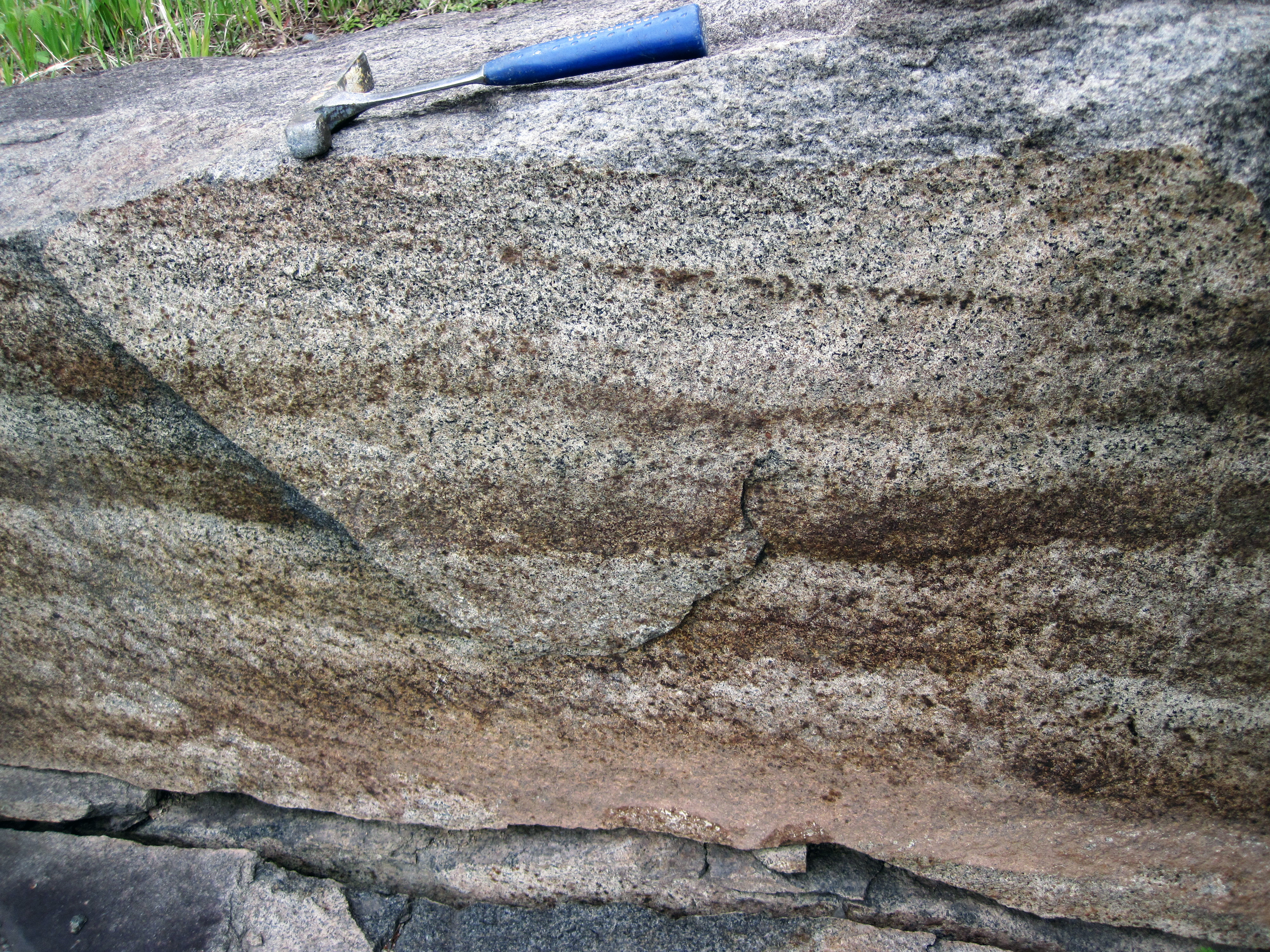
Layered gabbro near Duluth

Some 1,100 million years ago (mya) the North American craton began to split apart in the Midcontinent Rift. Over a period of some 15 to 22 million years, magma rose through the Earth’s crust, separating the older formations and cooling into new rock in the area of the rift. The rock sequences thereby created are known as the Keweenawan Supergroup. Rocks of this group north of Lake Superior are the layers of the North Shore Volcanic Group and the adjoining formations of the Duluth and Beaver Bay Complexes.

The North Shore Volcanics originated c. 1109-1096 mya from hundreds of individual lava flows, forming six distinct tilted and partially stacked plateaus which total more than 8,000 meters in thickness. These tilt toward the syncline under Lake Superior, as shown in the adjacent picture of the Sawtooth Mountains, the slopes of which mirror those of the shoreline rocks. While principally basaltic, these flows also include rhyolites and other types. As part of the Middle Proterozoic Keweenawan sequence, these volcanic layers are part of one of the oldest, largest, and best-preserved plateau lava provinces in the world.

These volcanics created the "roof rocks" into which were emplaced the mafic formations of the Duluth Complex. Primarily formed after 1102 mya, the oldest formations are near Duluth, and the youngest to the northeast near Tofte. Insulated by the overlying roof rock, upwelling magma cooled slowly, and the mafic rock into which it cooled therefore is coarse-grained. These intrusions formed a sill some 16 km thick, primarily of gabbro, but with significant amounts of anorthosite and other related granitic rocks. The Duluth Complex is one of the largest intrusions of gabbro on earth, and one of the largest layered mafic intrusions known. It covers an area of 4715 km^{2}. The upper differentiated portions of the intrusion include ilmenite-bearing labradorite anorthosites. The lower portion along the northwestern margin consists of ultramafic cumulates with associated segregations of nickel, copper and platinum group elements. Those metallic ores have attracted the interest of resource companies, and their attempts to mine are opposed by conservationists.

Along its northern margin, the Duluth Complex adjoins older structures, the Archean Ely Greenstones (once believed to be the oldest exposed rock on earth), and the ore-bearing Mesabi and Gunflint iron ranges deposited as part of the Animikie Group from the Penokean orogeny, a mountain-building event from Paleoproterozoic times. Those two Middle Precambrian ranges are thought to have comprised a single formation, but intruding magma of the Duluth Complex baked and engulfed the center of the mountain chain, separating it into the two ranges present today, as shown in the image at the top of this page.

To the east, the complex abuts and intrudes into the Rove Formation, an older structure of sedimentary rocks. Gabbro and diabase structures of the Duluth Complex trend generally from southwest to northeast, and differential erosion has left a series of ridges comprising these harder mafic rocks rising from the softer sedimentary rocks of the Rove Formation. Elongated lakes lie in many of these depressions.

To the south near Lake Superior, rock strata of the Duluth and Beaver Bay complexes are interspersed with and underlie the extrusive rock of the North Shore Volcanic Group. The Beaver Bay Complex occupies the center of the North Shore Volcanics, and is slightly younger in age than the other mafic rocks of the Duluth Complex, dating from c. 1096 mya. The volcanics and more recent sedimentary rocks were once thought to be underlain by the Duluth Complex across Lake Superior to Wisconsin, where gabbro formations also exist. The Duluth Complex was considered to be a giant lopolith, a lens-shaped structure depressed in the center, connecting gabbro exposures on opposite sides of the lake, but now is recognized to extend only a few kilometers south of Superior's North Shore.

== Contemporary landforms ==
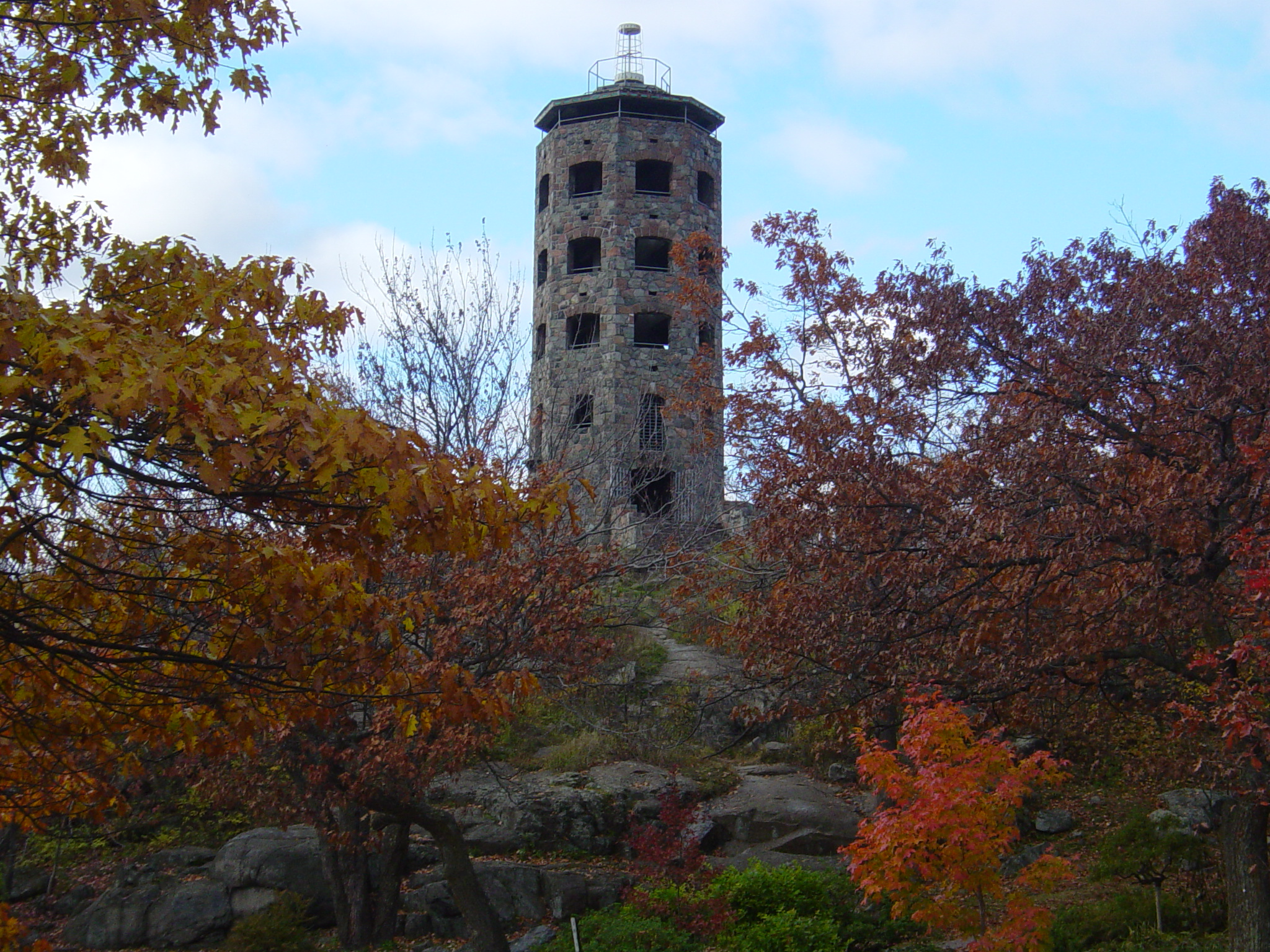
Duluth's Enger Tower, constructed of local Keweenawan rocks, atop a gabbro knob (foreground)

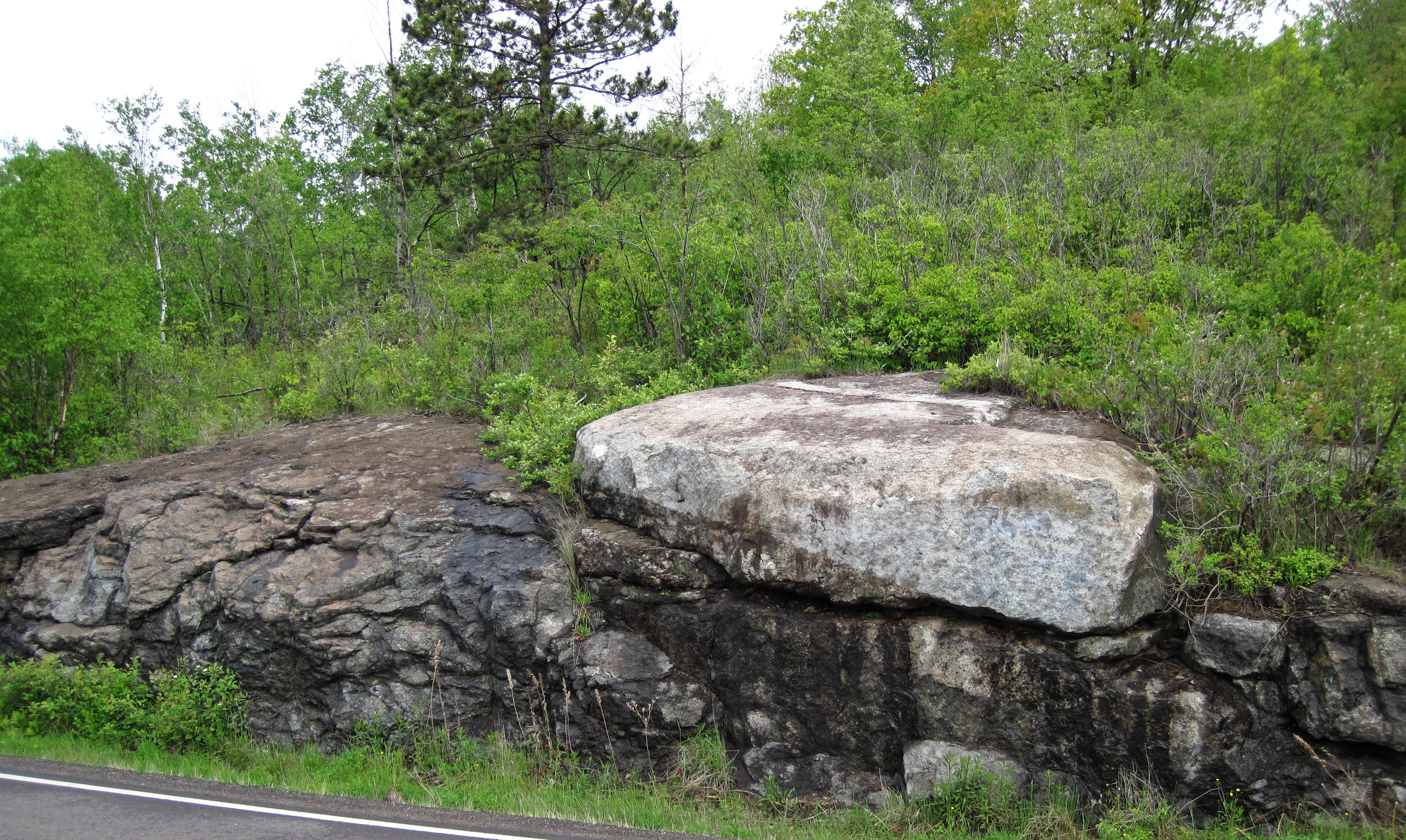
Large anorthosite xenolith in ophitic ilmenite gabbro in Duluth

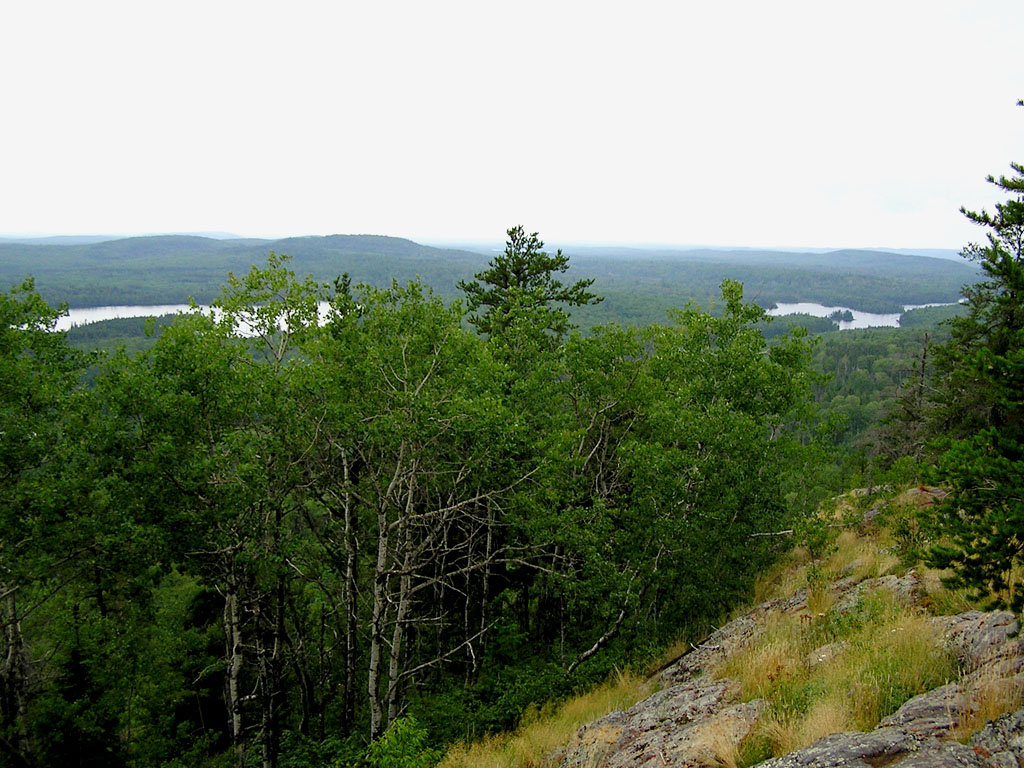
The rugged Misquah Hills

The Precambrian bedrock of the Duluth Complex and the North Shore Volcanics is close to or at the surface and not buried beneath layers of later sedimentary rock as is common further south. Glaciers scoured away earlier soils, and as is typical of the Canadian Shield, the new topsoils are thin and poor, being derived from the rock beneath or nearby rather than from deep layers of glacial till, which is intermittent and relatively shallow over most of the region. Consequently much of the bedrock is exposed, except for sediments and glacial till in the watershed of the Saint Louis and Cloquet Rivers inland on the west.

Gabbro outcroppings anchor both ends of the complex. They dominate the city which gave the Duluth Complex its name, and also form part of Pigeon Point, the easternmost point of Minnesota. In between, Superior's shoreline from Duluth to the international border has been likened to one long volcanic outcrop, albeit interrupted by parts of the Beaver Bay Complex, such as the anorthosite cliffs at Split Rock Lighthouse adjacent to basalt flows. Prominent relics of volcanism include rhyolitic cliffs at Palisade Head, basaltic lava flows at Gooseberry Falls, and the Sawtooth Mountains further east. Along the lakeshore can be found quartz-banded thomsonite and agate gemstones created by mineral infilling of gas cavities formed when the lava flows cooled.

Interior highlands include Eagle Mountain and the Misquah Hills. Most of the eastern part of the Superior National Forest and its Boundary Waters Canoe Area Wilderness (BWCAW) is located on the Duluth Complex, and its exposed Late Precambrian bedrock formations are characteristic features of the region. The inland lakes lie in hollows formed by differential erosion of the gabbro intrusions. These depressions were given their final form by glacial scouring during recent ice ages, creating the irregularly shaped and rocky-shored lakes which are hallmarks of the wilderness.

== See also ==
- Geology of Minnesota
- Coldwell Complex

== Sources ==
- Chandler (2005), A Geophysical Investigation of the Ely Greenstone Belt in the Soudan Area. Retrieved 2013-11-23.
- Frey, Martin; Robinson, Doug (1999). Low-Grade Metamorphism. Oxford: Blackwell Science. ISBN 978-0-632-04756-7.
- Generalized Density of Bedrock Outcrops and Drill Holes in Northeast Minnesota (map), University of Minnesota (2001). Retrieved 2013-11-23.
- Green, John (2004): Volcanic and Sedimentary Rocks of the Southwestern Sequence of the North Shore Volcanic Group, Field Trip Guidebook, Proceedings 50, Vol. 2. Institute on Lake Superior Geology, 2004. Retrieved 2013-11-23.
- Guilbert, John M. and Charles F. Park, Jr., The Geology of Ore Deposits, Freeman, 1986, ISBN 0-7167-1456-6.
- Heinselman, Miron (1996). The Boundary Waters Canoe Area Wilderness Ecosystem. Minneapolis: University of Minnesota Press. ISBN 0-8166-2804-1.
- Jirsa, Mark; David Southwick (2000-10-12). "Mineral potential and geology of the Duluth Complex". Mineral Potential and Geology of Minnesota. Minnesota Geological Survey, University of Minnesota.
- LaBerge, Gene L. (1994). Geology of the Lake Superior Region. Tucson, AZ: Geoscience Press. ISBN 0-945005-15-6.
- Miller, J.D.; Green, J.C.; Severson, M.J.; Chandler, V.W.; and Peterson, D.M.; Geologic Map of the Duluth Complex and Related Rocks, Northeastern Minnesota, University of Minnesota (2001). Retrieved 2013-11-23.
- Miller, Jim (2011). Geology and Mineral Deposits of the Duluth Complex, Minnesota and why it will be mined someday. USGS.
- Naldrett, Anthony J. (2004). Magmatic Sulfide Deposits: Geology, Geochemistry and Exploration. Berlin: Springer Verlag. ISBN 3-540-22317-7.
- Ojakangas, Richard W.; Dickas, Albert B. (2002-03-01). "The 1.1-Ga Midcontinent Rift System, central North America: sedimentology of two deep boreholes, Lake Superior Region". Sedimentary Geology. 147 (1–2). Elsevier Science B.V.: 13–36. Bibcode:2002SedG..147...13O. doi:10.1016/S0037-0738(01)00185-3.
- Ojakangas, Richard W.; Matsch, Charles L. (1982). Minnesota's Geology. Minneapolis: University of Minnesota Press. ISBN 0-8166-0953-5.
- Ojakangas, R. W.; G. B. Morey; J. C. Green (2001-06-01). "The Mesoproterozoic Midcontinent Rift System, Lake Superior Region, USA". Sedimentary Geology. 141–142: 421–442. Bibcode:2001SedG..141..421O. doi:10.1016/S0037-0738(01)00085-9.
- Sansome, Constance Jefferson (1983). Minnesota Underfoot: A Field Guide to the State's Outstanding Geologic Features. Stillwater, MN: Voyageur Press. ISBN 0-89658-036-9.
- Schmidt, S. Th. (May 1993). "Regional and local patterns of low-grade metamorphism in the North Shore Volcanic Group, Minnesota, USA". Journal of Metamorphic Geology. 11 (3). Blackwell Synergy: 401–14. Bibcode:1993JMetG..11..401S. doi:10.1111/j.1525-1314.1993.tb00157.x.
- Schneider, D. A.; D. K. Holm; V. Chandler (Fall 2006). A Superior Swath: Proterozoic Geology of the North American Midcontinent. American Geophysical Union. Bibcode:2006AGUFM.T42A..06S.
- Schwartz, George M.; Thiel, George A. (1963). Minnesota's Rocks and Waters. Minneapolis: University of Minnesota Press. LOC 54-6370.
- "Split Rock Lighthouse State Park Info". State Parks. Minnesota Department of Natural Resources. 2013. Archived from the original on 2009-02-11.
- "A Tapestry of Time and Terrain". Physiographic Regions. United States Geological Survey. 2003-04-17. Archived from the original on 2006-05-15.
- Topinka, Lynn (2003-01-26). "Minnesota". America's Volcanic Past. United States Geological Survey. Archived from the original on 2009-01-10.
- Vervoort, J; Wirth, Karl; Kennedy, Bryan; Sandland, Travis; Harpp, Karen S. (2007). "The magmatic evolution of the Midcontinent rift: New geochronologic and geochemical evidence from felsic magmatism" (PDF). Precambrian Research. 157 (1–4): 235–268. Bibcode:2007PreR..157..235V. doi:10.1016/j.precamres.2007.02.019. Archived from the original (PDF) on 2017-08-10.
