= Lima Mountain =

Mountain in Minnesota, United States

- Location within Minnesota

Highest point
- Elevation: 2,238 ft (682 m)
- Coordinates: 47°59′12.8394″N 90°24′12.9594″W

Geography
- Location: Cook County, Minnesota, U.S.
- Parent range: Misquah Hills

Lima Mountain is a 2238-foot summit in Cook County, Minnesota. It is located in the Lima Mountain Unit, a 2540-acre inventoried roadless area adjacent to the Boundary Waters Canoe Area. There is a 1-mile trail to the summit, where a fire tower once stood. Lima Mountain has a 328-foot rise over the saddle connecting it with the Misquah Hills High Point and Peak 2266. A trail to the summit begins along the Lima Grade (Forest Route 315) just north of its junction with Lima Mountain Road (Forest Route 152)
