= Misquah Hills High Point =

Mountain in Minnesota, United States

- Location within Minnesota

Highest point
- Elevation: 2,260 ft (690 m)
- Prominence: 380 ft (120 m)
- Coordinates: 47°58′30″N 90°31′11″W

Geography
- Location: Cook County, Minnesota, U.S.

The Misquah Hills High Point, or Point 2260 is the unnamed high point of the Misquah Hills and the third highest point in the state of Minnesota. It has 420 feet of clean prominence from its parent, Eagle Mountain, from which it is 5.68 miles away.

Point 2230 (at 2230 feet) was considered to be the highest point in the Misquah Hills, and indeed in the state of Minnesota, until the region was resurveyed in 1961. This survey not only established that Eagle Mountain was significantly higher than the Misquah Hills, but found additional points higher than Point 2230 within the Misquah Hills themselves. Thus the high point of the Misquah Hills was established as point 2260 (at 2260 feet), located on the east edge of Winchell Lake.

== Climate ==
Climate data for Misquah Hills High Point 47.9825 N, 90.4482 W, Elevation: 1,969 ft (600 m) (1991–2020 normals)
Month	Jan	Feb	Mar	Apr	May	Jun	Jul	Aug	Sep	Oct	Nov	Dec	Year
Mean daily maximum °F (°C)	12.6 (−10.8)	19.0 (−7.2)	32.1 (0.1)	44.1 (6.7)	59.9 (15.5)	70.1 (21.2)	75.3 (24.1)	74.4 (23.6)	64.0 (17.8)	46.3 (7.9)	31.7 (−0.2)	18.9 (−7.3)	45.7 (7.6)
Daily mean °F (°C)	2.7 (−16.3)	7.7 (−13.5)	20.0 (−6.7)	33.9 (1.1)	49.3 (9.6)	59.6 (15.3)	64.9 (18.3)	63.1 (17.3)	54.1 (12.3)	38.9 (3.8)	23.9 (−4.5)	10.3 (−12.1)	35.7 (2.1)
Mean daily minimum °F (°C)	−7.2 (−21.8)	−3.7 (−19.8)	8.0 (−13.3)	23.7 (−4.6)	38.7 (3.7)	49.0 (9.4)	54.5 (12.5)	51.8 (11.0)	44.2 (6.8)	31.5 (−0.3)	16.1 (−8.8)	1.7 (−16.8)	25.7 (−3.5)
Average precipitation inches (mm)	1.41 (36)	1.15 (29)	1.34 (34)	2.30 (58)	3.22 (82)	4.11 (104)	4.07 (103)	3.18 (81)	3.48 (88)	3.22 (82)	2.22 (56)	1.84 (47)	31.54 (800)
Source: PRISM Climate Group
