= Smoke Lake (Minnesota) =

Lake in Minnesota, United States

- Location within Minnesota
- Location: Tofte Township, Cook County, Minnesota, United States
- Coordinates: 47.8877°N 90.8584°W
- Basin countries: United States
- Surface area: 158 acres (64 ha)
- Average depth: 10.8 ft (3.3 m)
- Max. depth: 22 ft (6.7 m)
- Shore length^{1}: 3.37 mi (5.42 km)
- Surface elevation: 1,788 ft (545 m)
- ^{1} Shore length is not a well-defined measure.

Smoke Lake is a lake in Cook County, Minnesota within Tofte Township. It is within the Boundary Waters Canoe Area Wilderness and the Superior National Forest. The lake can be accessed by a 100 rods (500 m) portage from Sawbill Lake to the west and a 90 rods (450 m) portage from Burnt Lake to the east, which in turn is accessed from Entry Point 39 at Baker Lake through Peterson and Kelly lakes.

== Recreation ==
Recreational activities include camping, fishing, canoeing, and kayaking. There are four campsites on the lakeshore.

== Fish species ==
Fish species in Smoke Lake include northern pike, walleye, white sucker, and yellow perch.
