= Whale Lake =

Lake in the state of Minnesota, United States

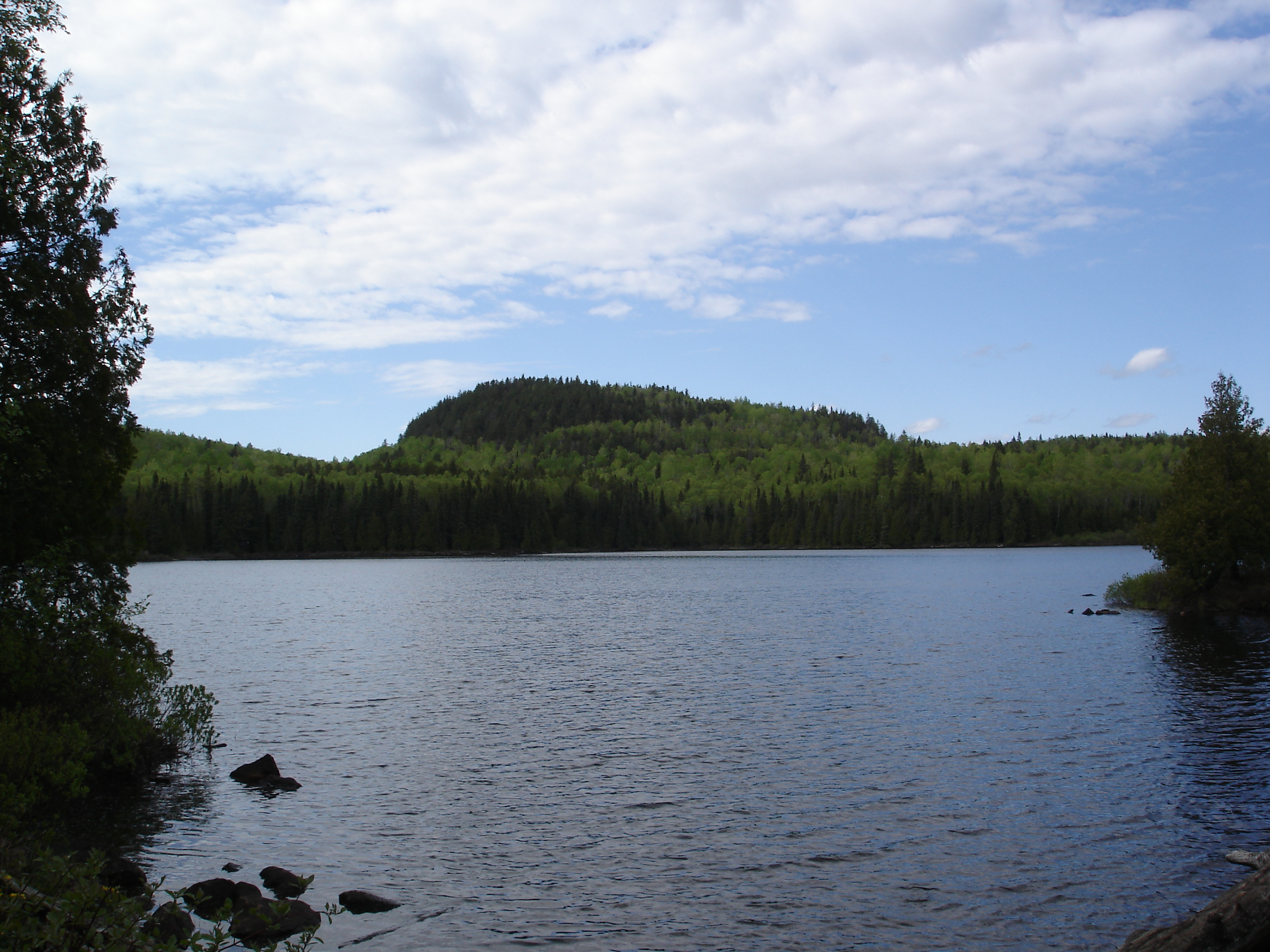
- Whale Lake on a summer evening.

- Location within Minnesota Location within the United States
- Location: West Cook, Cook County, Minnesota, United States
- Coordinates: 47°53′31.19″N 90°32′43.37″W
- Primary outflows: Whale Creek
- Basin countries: United States
- Surface area: 21 acres (8.5 ha)
- Max. depth: 10 ft (3.0 m)
- Surface elevation: 1,900 feet (580 m)
- Settlements: Grand Marais, Minnesota; Cook, Minnesota

Whale Lake is a lake in Cook County in what is known as the Arrowhead Region of northern Minnesota. It is within the Boundary Waters Canoe Area Wilderness of the Superior National Forest, at the base of Eagle Mountain, Minnesota's highest point. Two miles (3 km) from the nearest road, Whale Lake is only accessible via the Eagle Mountain Hiking Trail from the south, or the Brule Lake Trail from the northwest. It offers two campsites to hikers, one on the northern shore near the intersection of the two trails, and the other a few hundred yards away from the western shore.

Whale Lake has been known to contain Bluegill, Northern Pike, Yellow Perch, and more commonly, White Sucker fish.

Whale Lake, on an early Spring day

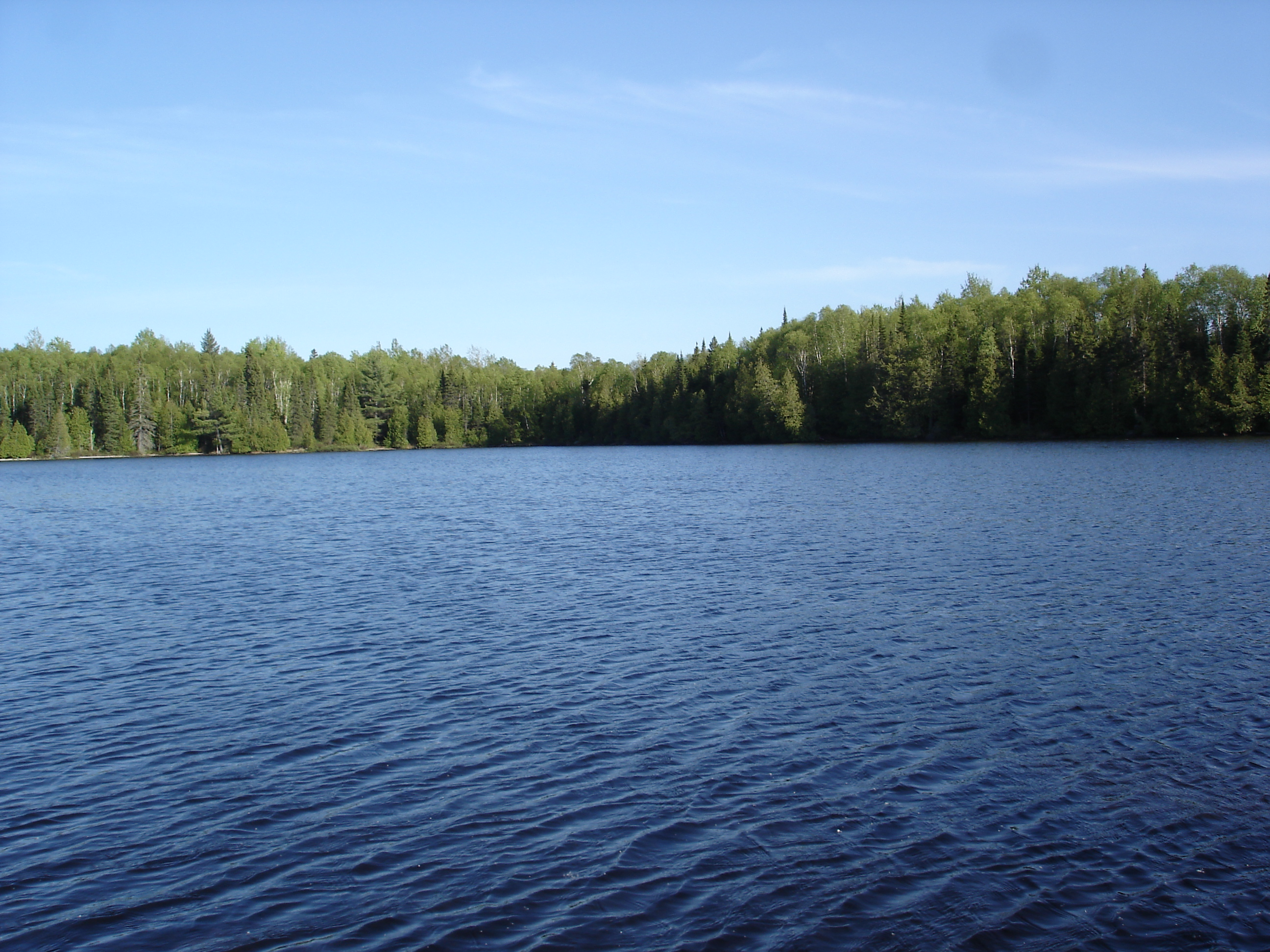
Looking southeast over Whale Lake

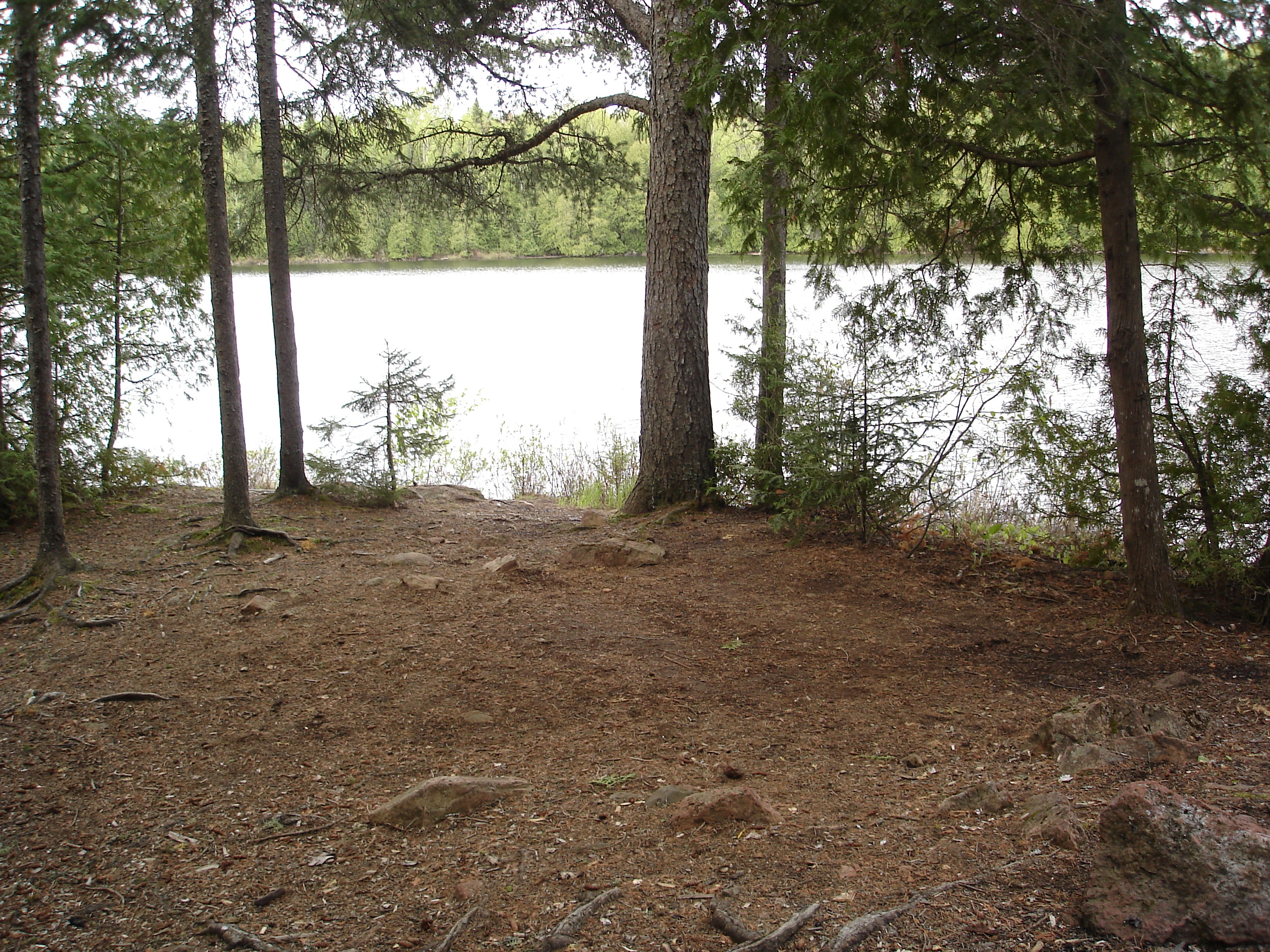
Looking south across Whale Lake. Campsite in the foreground.

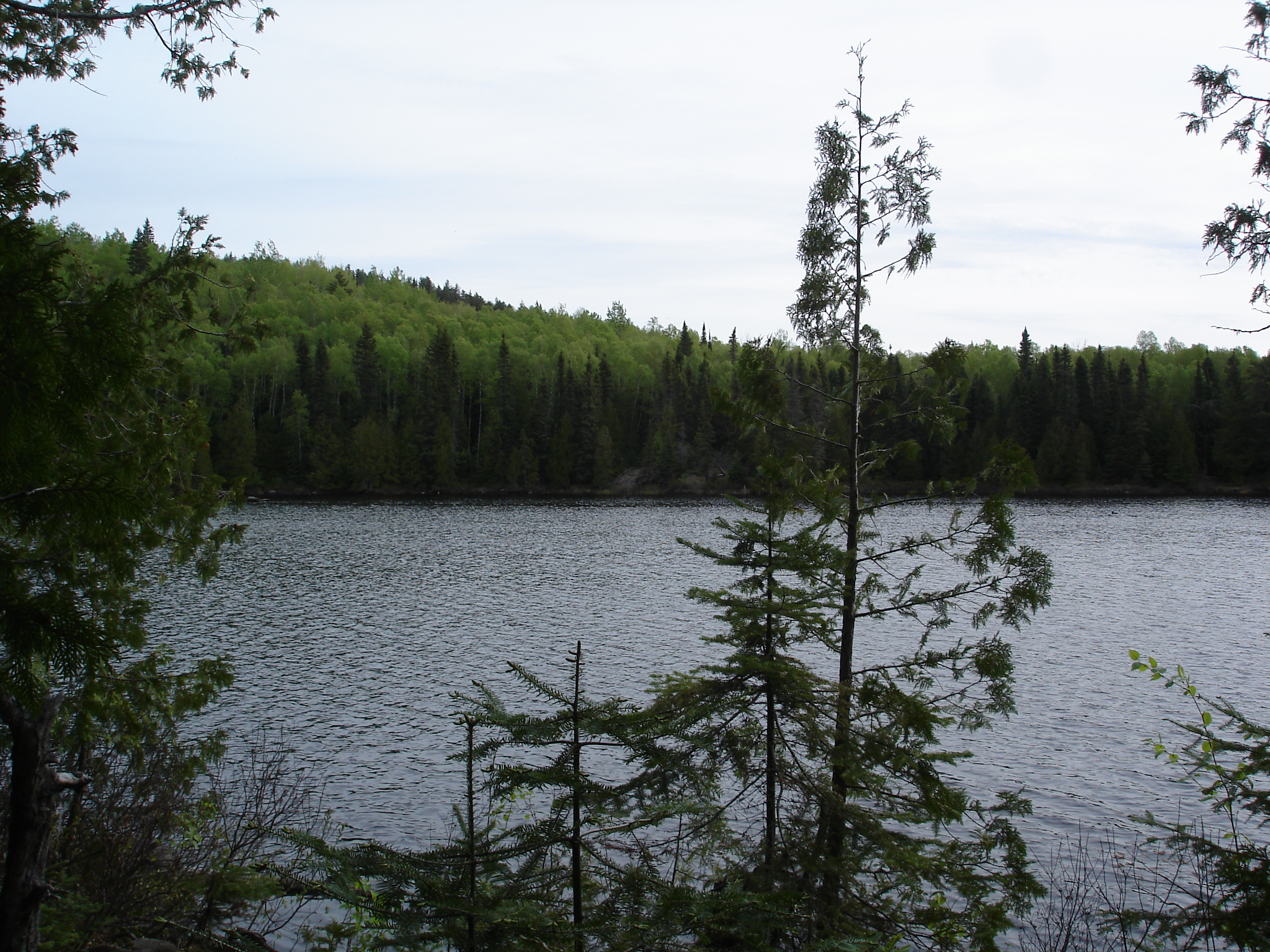
Looking southwest across Whale Lake
