= Kelso Lake (Minnesota) =

Lake in the state of Minnesota, United States

- Location within Minnesota Location within the United States
- Location: Cook County, Minnesota, United States
- Coordinates: 47.9102°N 90.9058°W
- Basin countries: United States
- Surface area: 132.7 acres (53.7 ha)
- Average depth: 10.8 ft (3.3 m)
- Max. depth: 16 ft (4.9 m)
- Shore length^{1}: 7.85 mi (12.63 km)
- Surface elevation: 1,798 ft (548 m)
- ^{1} Shore length is not a well-defined measure.

Kelso Lake is a lake in Cook County, Minnesota. It is within the Boundary Waters Canoe Area Wilderness and the Superior National Forest. Kelso Lake is a very long and narrow lake. It lies west of Sawbill Lake.

== Recreation ==
There are three designated campsites on the lakeshore. Two campsites are on the north end of the lake, one is on the south end near the 10 rods (50 m) portage south to Alton Lake.

Kelso Lake is connected by navigable creek to Lujenida Lake to the north, which in turn provides access to the Lujenida portage, one of the longest in the Boundary Waters at 480 rods.

== Fish species ==
Fish species in Kelso Lake include bluegill, northern pike, smallmouth bass, yellow perch, and white sucker.
