= Sawbill Lake =

Lake in the state of Minnesota, United States

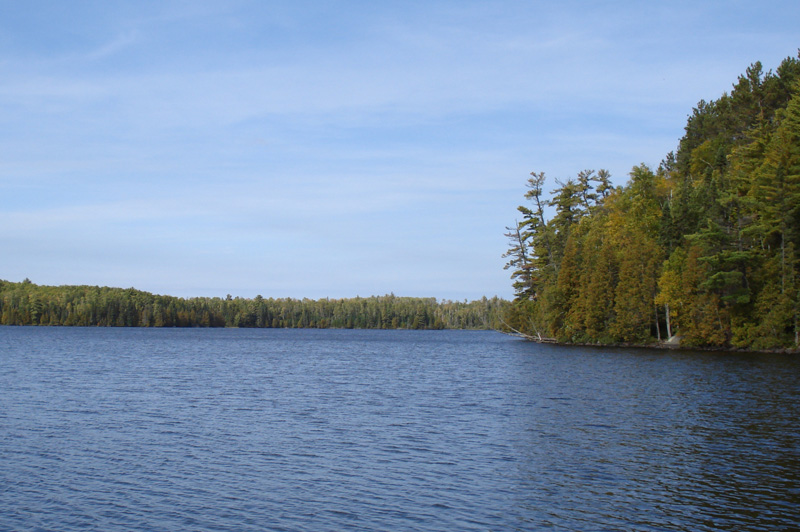

- Location within Minnesota Location within the United States
- Location: Tofte Township, Cook County, Minnesota, United States
- Coordinates: 47.8867°N 90.8779°W
- Basin countries: United States
- Surface area: 765 acres (310 ha)
- Max. depth: 45 ft (14 m)
- Surface elevation: 1,787 ft (545 m)

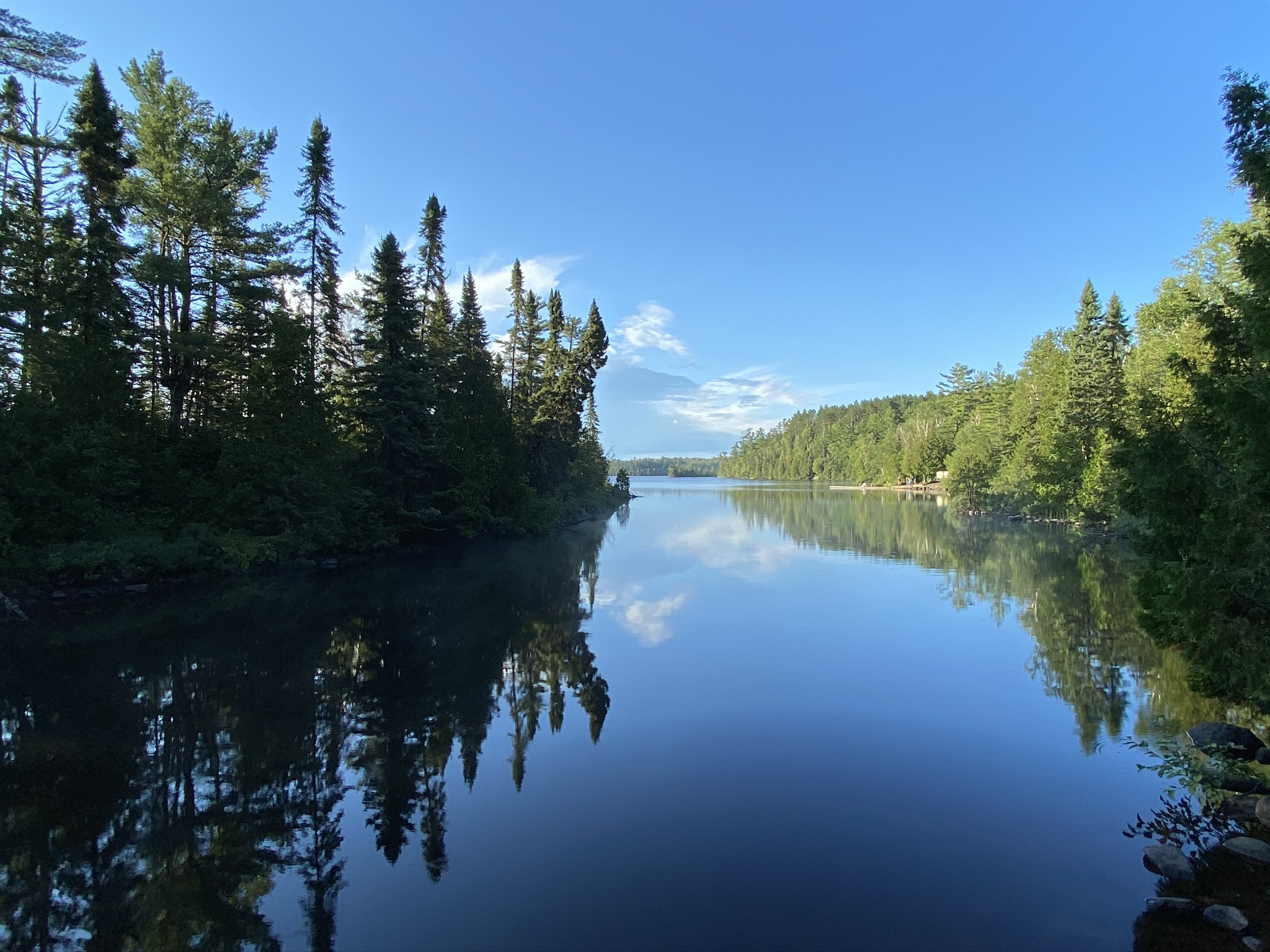

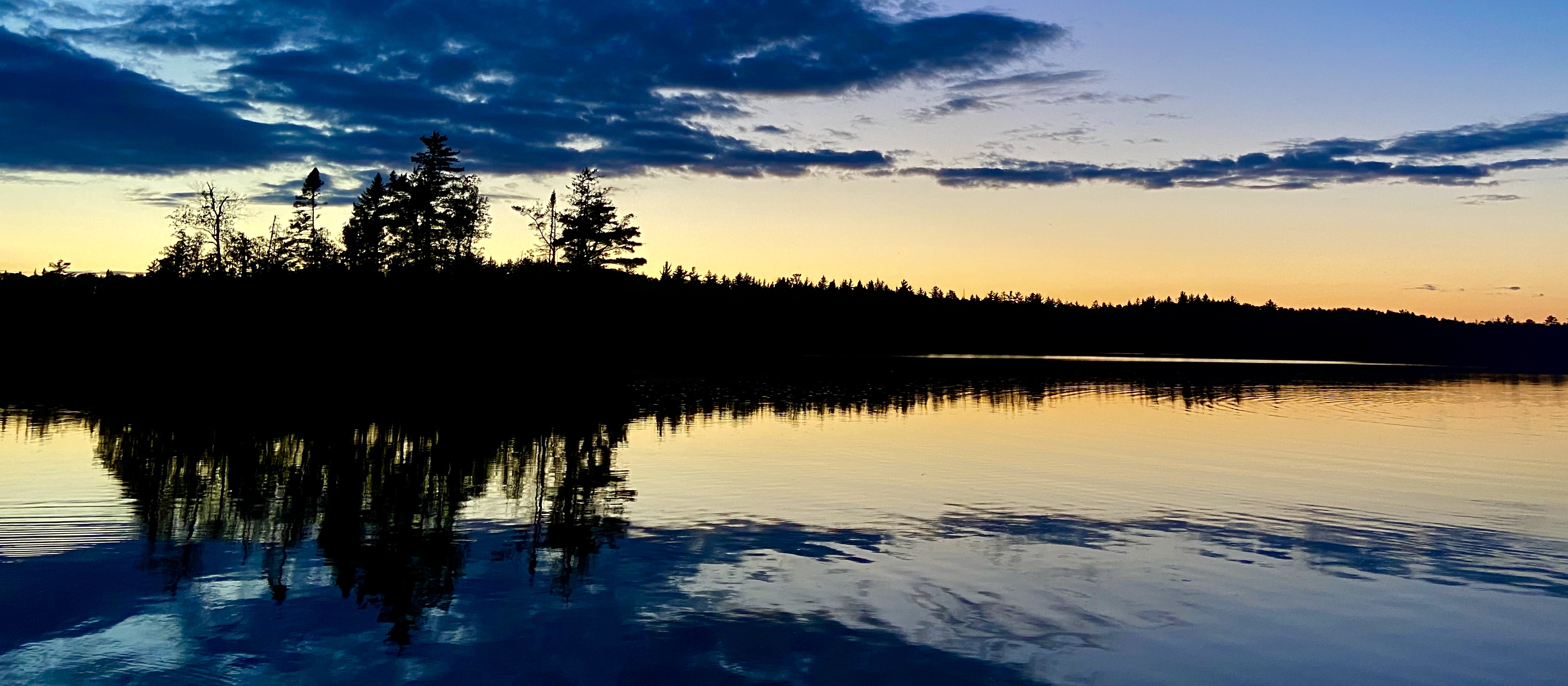

Sawbill Lake is a lake in Cook County, Minnesota. It is located at the end of the Sawbill Trail (County Road 2), 23 miles north of the nearest town of Tofte. It is a popular entry point (number 38) to the Boundary Waters Canoe Area Wilderness (BWCAW) in the Superior National Forest. There is a United States Forest Service cabin, a canoe outfitter, and a 52-site campground located at the southern end of the lake. The lake also features 13 backcountry campsites accessible by non-motorized watercraft with a wilderness permit.

Sawbill is connected by portages to Smoke Lake, Kelso Lake, Ada Creek and Alton Lake. The lake is part of the Lake Superior drainage basin via the Temperance River and Sawbill Creek, which flows out of the lake at its southern base.

== History ==
The southern portion of the lake was intentionally excluded from plans for a wilderness area in the 1930s to allow for recreation facilities to be located nearby. The Sawbill Lodge opened on the south end of the lake in 1935, operating until its closure in the 1980s. Timber for the main lodge was cut nearby and floated across the lake to the lodge site. In 1984, the original lodge building was dismantled and moved by truck to Solbakken Resort in Lutsen, where it remains today.

Sawbill Canoe Outfitters opened nearby in 1957, and continues to provide canoe and equipment rentals, a shuttle service, and a small camp store.

During the Great Depression there was a Civilian Conservation Corps (CCC) camp six miles south of the lake. The CCC built many of the portages in the area, and the Sawbill Guard Station, a log cabin located north of the campground that is used by the Forest Service to house seasonal volunteers and as a base for operation in the area. In 1936, one person was injured when a barge carrying 24 CCC youths overturned on the lake while returning from a firefighting assignment.

== Wildlife ==
Sawbill Lake supports populations of burbot, cisco, northern pike, rock bass, smallmouth bass, walleye, white sucker, and yellow perch. Loons, bald eagles, black bears, bobcats, Canada lynx, moose, and beavers, among others, are also found in the area. Sawbill is a nickname of the common merganser duck, another common species.
