= Peak 2266 =

Mountain in Minnesota, United States

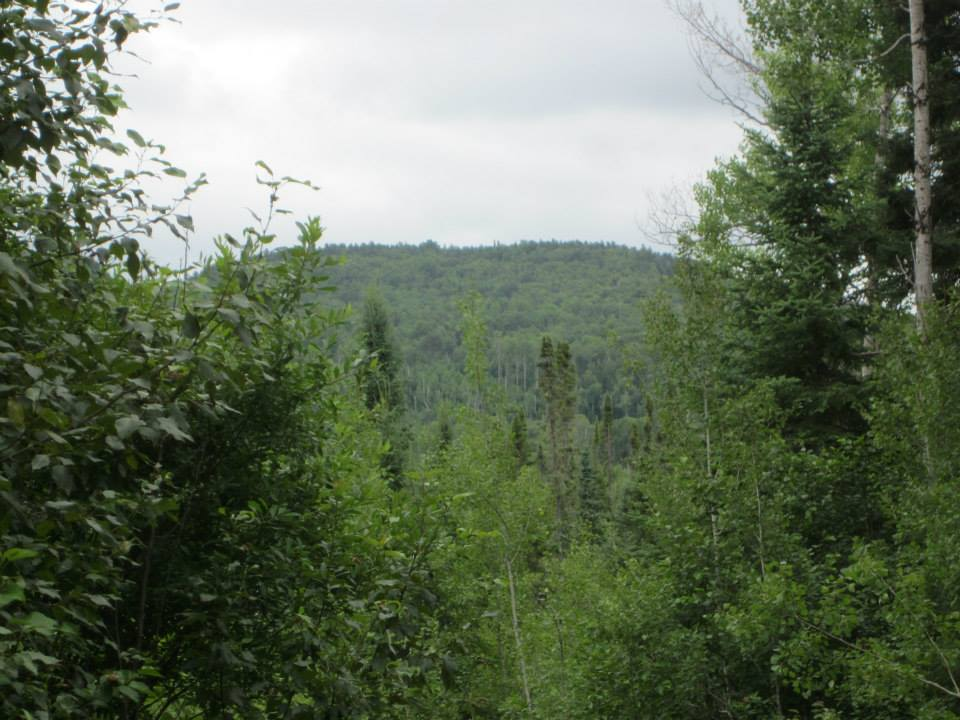

Highest point
- Elevation: 2,266 ft (691 m)
- Coordinates: 47°55′46.4556″N 90°22′14.9412″W

Geography
- Location within Minnesota
- Location: Cook County, Minnesota, U.S.
- Parent range: Misquah Hills

Peak 2266 is the second highest point in Minnesota, after Eagle Mountain. It is rarely climbed and has no summit trail. Peak 2266 was surveyed in 1961, in the same survey which established Eagle Mountain as the state's high point. The survey found that 2266 was also higher than the previous record holder, point 2230 in the Misquah Hills.
