= Laurentian Upland =

Province of the larger Canadian Shield physiographic division

Coordinates: 46°26′N 74°59′W

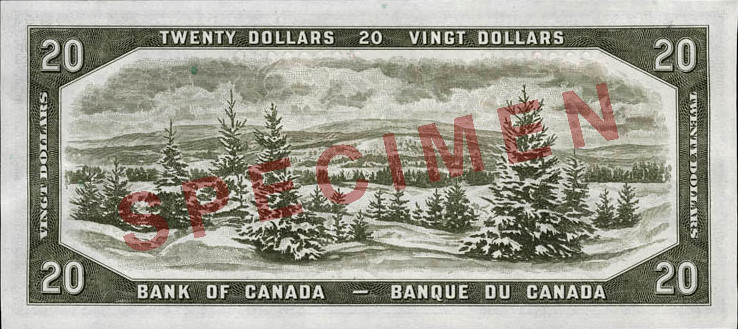
A scene of the Laurentians based on a photograph from the Provincial Publicity Bureau of Quebec engraved by William Ford was on the $20 banknote of the 1954 Series.

The Laurentian Upland (or Laurentian Highlands) is a physiographic region which, when referred to as the "Laurentian Region" or the Grenville geological province, is recognized by Natural Resources Canada as one of five provinces of the larger Canadian Shield physiographic division. The United States Geological Survey recognizes the Laurentian Upland as the larger general upland area of the Canadian Shield.

== Geography ==
The Laurentian Region, as recognized by Natural Resources Canada, is part of the plateau and dissected southern rim of the Canadian Shield in the province of Québec. It is a western extension of the Laurentian Mountains, and continues across the Ottawa Valley into Ontario as the Opeongo Hills. Viewed from the valleys of the Ottawa and St. Lawrence Rivers, the south-facing escarpments of the Shield give the appearance of mountains 500–800 meters high; looking across the plateau, the relief is more moderate and subdued. These scarps mark the dramatic southern edge of this Upland region, of which Mont Raoul Blanchard is the highest peak. Although the other limits are less well defined, this Laurentian Region in Quebec may be considered to extend 100–200 km northward from the scarps and to stretch from the Gatineau River in the west (mean elevation 400 m) some 550 km to the Saguenay River in the northeast. Here it attains its maximum elevation north of Quebec City in the Réserve faunique des Laurentides (over 1000 m). Individual summits rise above the plateau surface: Mont Sir Wilfrid (783 m) and Mont Tremblant in the west, Mont Sainte-Anne (815 m) at Quebec, Mont Raoul Blanchard (1166 m), Mont Bleu (1052 m) and Mont des Conscrits (1006 m) in Réserve faunique des Laurentides. Cap Tourmente (579 m) and Mont des Éboulements (770 m) are dramatic examples of the scarp face as it drops precipitously to the St Lawrence River.

The more general Laurentian Upland Province may be considered to extend over a larger area of the Canadian Shield, into Northwestern Ontario and parts of Northern Minnesota, Wisconsin, Michigan, and New York State, and is recognized by the United States Geological Survey to include the Superior Upland. As a southern extension of the Canadian Shield, the Adirondack Mountains of New York State might also be considered an extension of the Laurentian Upland.

== Geology ==
The Laurentian Upland is primarily made up of ancient Precambrian igneous, metamorphic, and sedimentary rock. With the exception of the river valleys and lacustrine basins, it is a rolling to mountainous peneplain that ranges from 800 to 1400 feet above sea level.

== Superior Upland ==
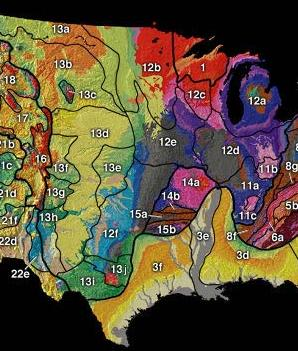
Physiographic area map of the interior United States. The Superior Upland is identified by "1" on the map.

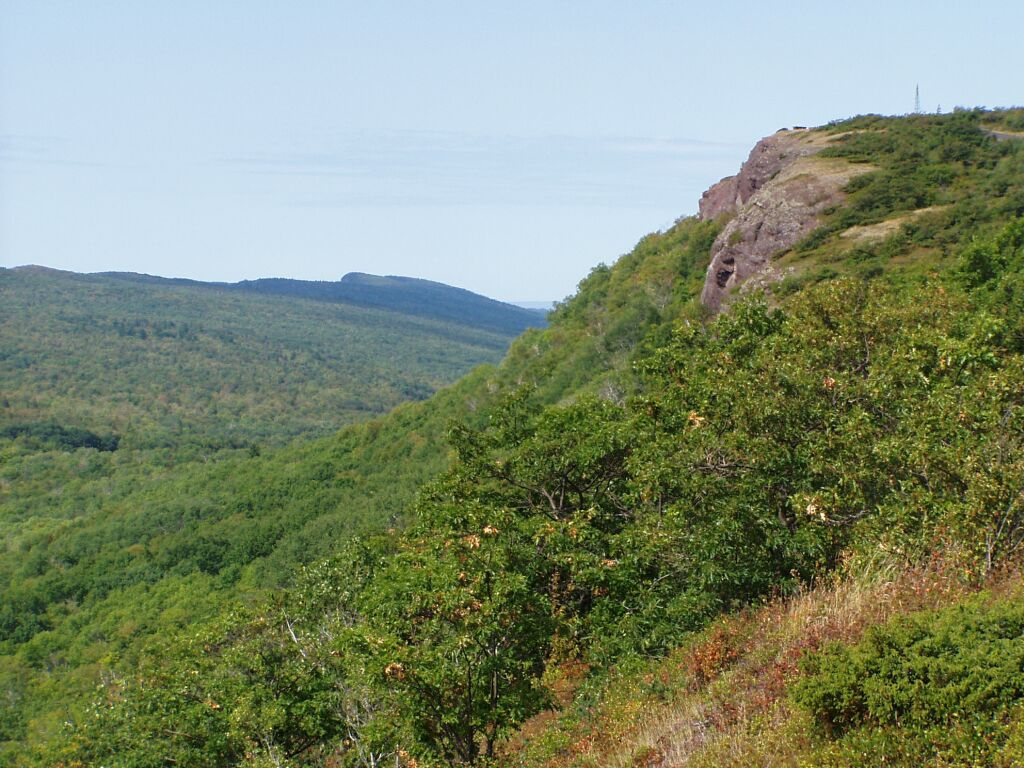
Brockway Mountains of the Keweenaw Peninsula, Michigan (Precambrian of the Keweenian Series)

The Superior Upland is the province of the Laurentian Upland which projects into the United States west and south of Lake Superior. This upland, part of the Canadian Shield along with the Adirondacks, is a greatly deformed structure and is composed primarily of igneous and metamorphic crystalline rocks commonly associated with a rugged landscape. At some prehistoric period, this had a strong relief, but today the upland as a whole is gently rolling with the inter-stream surfaces being plateau-like in their evenness. Here they have elevations of 1,400 to 2,300 feet (700 m) in their higher areas, such as the Misquah Hills and Huron Mountains. Ancient mountain regions were initiated by crustal deformation and then reduced by a long, continued erosion to a peneplain with occasional moderately high monadnocks left behind during the peneplanation of the rest of the surface. The erosion of the region must have been far advanced in prehistoric times, perhaps mostly completed, because the even peneplain surface is overlapped by fossiliferous marine strata from an early geological date, Cambrian. This shows that the depression of the region beneath an ancient sea took place after a long existence as dry land.

The extent of the submergence and the area over which the Palaeozoic strata were deposited are unknown. Because of the renewed elevation without deformation, erosion in later periods has stripped off an undetermined amount of the covering strata. The valleys by which the uplands are here and there trenched to moderate depth appear to be, in part at least, the work of streams that have been superposed upon the peneplain through the now removed cover of stratified rocks.

Glaciation has strongly scoured away the deeply weathered soils that presumably existed here in preglacial time. It left behind firm and rugged ledges in the low hills and swells of the ground and spread an irregular drift cover over the lower parts, whereby the drainage is generally disordered being deposited in lakes and swamps and elsewhere rushing down rocky rapids.

== See also ==
- Laurentian Mountains
- Opeongo Hills
- Adirondack Mountains
- Misquah Hills
- Huron Mountains
- Porcupine Mountains
