= Misquah Hills =

Mountain range in the American state of Minnesota

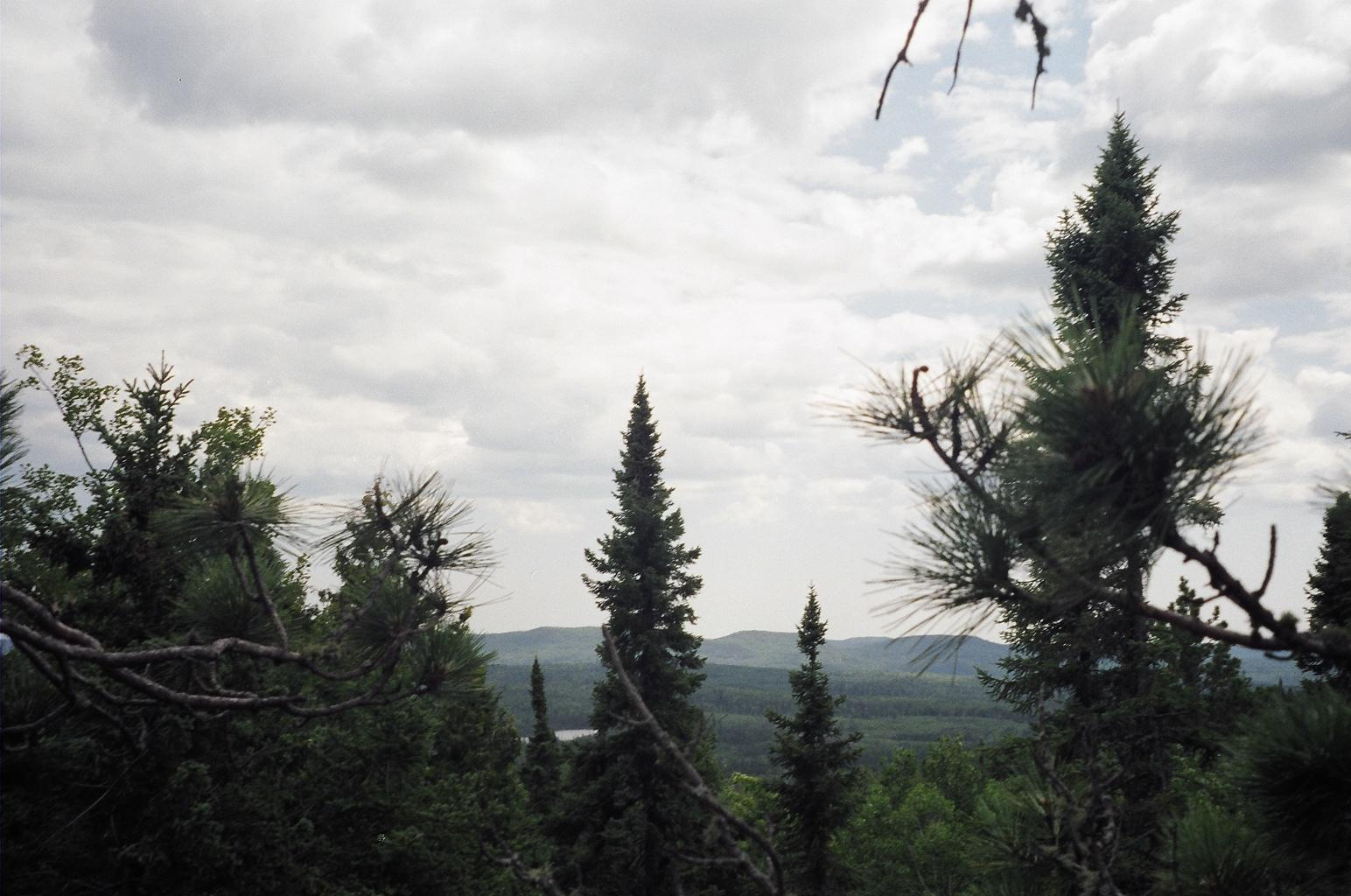
- Misquah Hills from the summit of Lima Mountain

Highest point
- Peak: Eagle Mountain
- Elevation: 2,301 ft (701 m)

Naming
- Etymology: "Misquah" (or miskwaa) is the Ojibwe word for "red".

Geography
- Location within Minnesota
- Country: United States
- State: Minnesota
- County: Cook
- Range coordinates: 47°59′N 90°34′W

Geology
- Rock age(s): Stenian, Proterozoic era
- Rock type: Duluth Complex (Granophyre)
- Managed by the Minnesota Department of Natural Resources

The Misquah Hills are a range of mountains in northeastern Minnesota, in the United States. They are located in or near the Boundary Waters Canoe Area Wilderness within Superior National Forest. Eagle Mountain, the highest point in Minnesota at 2,301 feet (701 meters), is considered to be part of the Misquah Hills.

== Geography ==
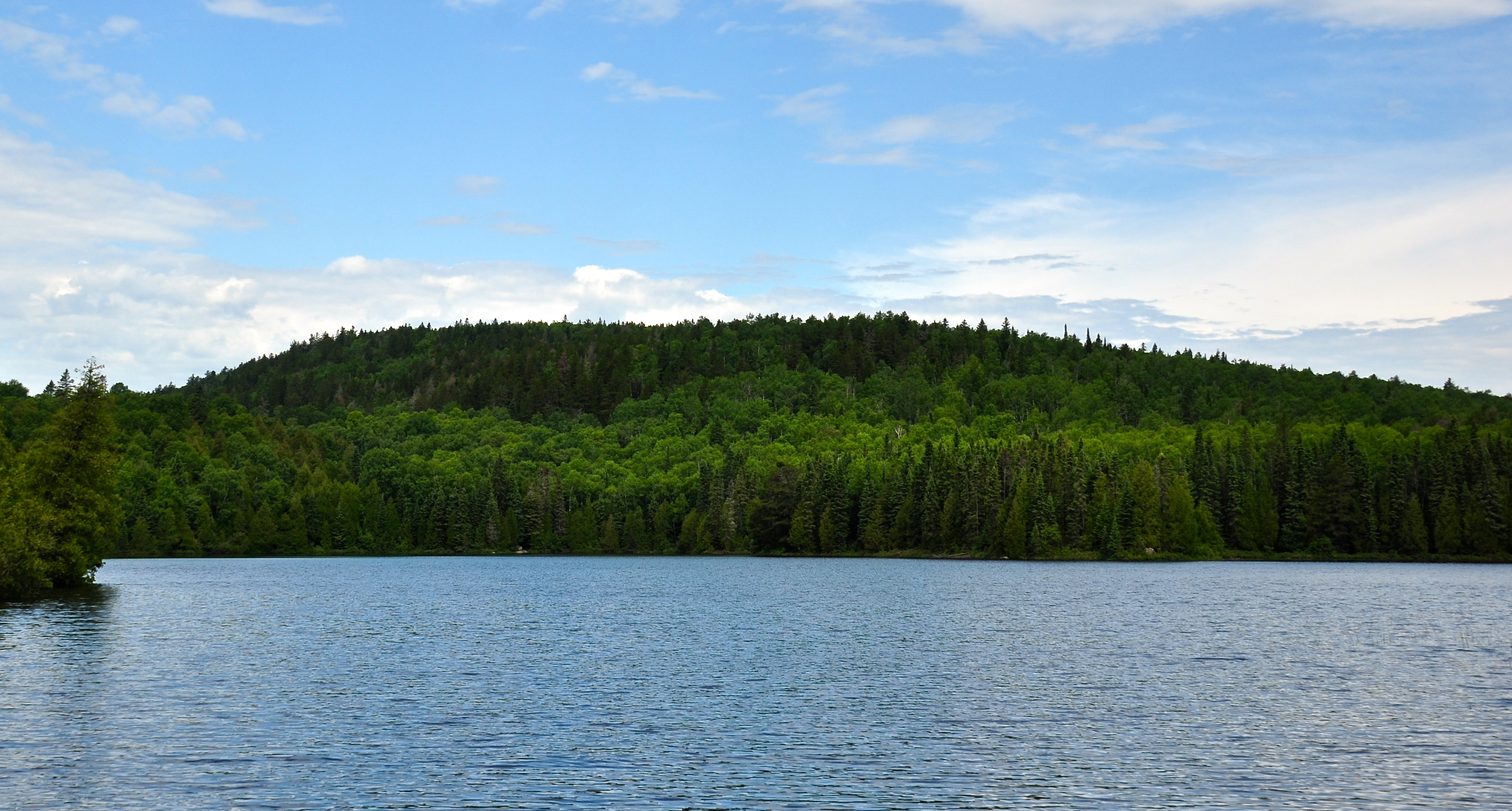
Eagle Mountain

The Misquah Hills are oriented east-to-west, north of the Brule River valley, and south of Cross Lake and Winchell Lake. Their peaks are all within four miles east and seven miles west of Misquah Lake, and include several of the highest points in Minnesota. More broadly, the term has been used to include the ridges and monadnocks to the south of the Brule as well. Point 2260, Gaskin Mountain (2245 ft), and Point 2230 (misidentified by Grant and Winchell as the highest point in the state) are all within the Misquah Hills by the strict definition, and Eagle Mountain (2301 ft), Peak 2266, Lima Mountain (2238 ft), Brule Mountain (2226 ft), and Pine Mountain (2194 ft) are commonly included. Adding to this confusion, the preliminary report of the original leveling party included three unnamed knobs three miles east of the Brule Mountain in the Misquah Hills as well, roughly in the area of Peak 2266.

Their elevation above the surrounding plateau does not exceed 600 feet. Eagle Mountain, the highest point in Minnesota at 2,301 feet (701 meters) above sea level, is about 1700 feet above nearby Lake Superior. At this modest elevation the Misquah Hills nevertheless are the highest points for over five hundred miles (~800 km) in any direction, as well as the second-highest range of the Canadian Shield in the US, after the Adirondack Mountains.

== Geology ==
The bedrock of the Misquah Hills is a granophyre within the Duluth Complex, a relatively recent addition to the larger Precambrian rock formations of the Canadian Shield. This complex was formed during the Midcontinent Rift event. The rock type of the Misquah Hills ranges from granite to quartz monzonite to monzodiorite. These rocks date to 1106.0±5.1 Ma, placing them in the middle of the Stenian period of the Mesoproterozoic era. The Misquahs are geological cousins of the Adirondacks and the Laurentian Mountains of Quebec; they bear some visual resemblance to these ranges, though on a smaller scale.

== Ecology ==
The Misquah Hills are thickly forested, though there are granite outcrops and exposed bedrock in many places. The forest cover consists largely of balsam fir and varieties of spruce; eastern white pine, red pine, quaking aspen, paper birch, and northern white cedar are also common in the area. The Misquahs are part in the Laurentian Mixed Forest Province, a transition zone between boreal forest to the north and broadleaf forests to the south.

== Exploration ==
The Misquah Hills were surveyed by Newton H. Winchell, Minnesota state geologist, and Ulysses Sherman Grant in the 1890s, who, using an aneroid barometer mistakenly gave the title of highest peak in Minnesota to an unnamed 2230-foot summit near what is now called Winchell Lake. A United States Department of the Interior survey team remeasured several summits in the Misquahs in 1961, using aerial photographs and benchmarking (geolocating), resulting in the current set of height measurements.

== Recreation ==
Hiking in the Misquah Hills has long been overshadowed by the vast amount of excellent canoeing in the lakes of the Boundary Waters Canoe Area Wilderness. Many of the peaks remain unnamed, most are only accessible by water, and only Eagle Mountain, Lima Mountain, and Pine Mountain have summit trails.
