= Superior National Forest =

Forest in Minnesota, US

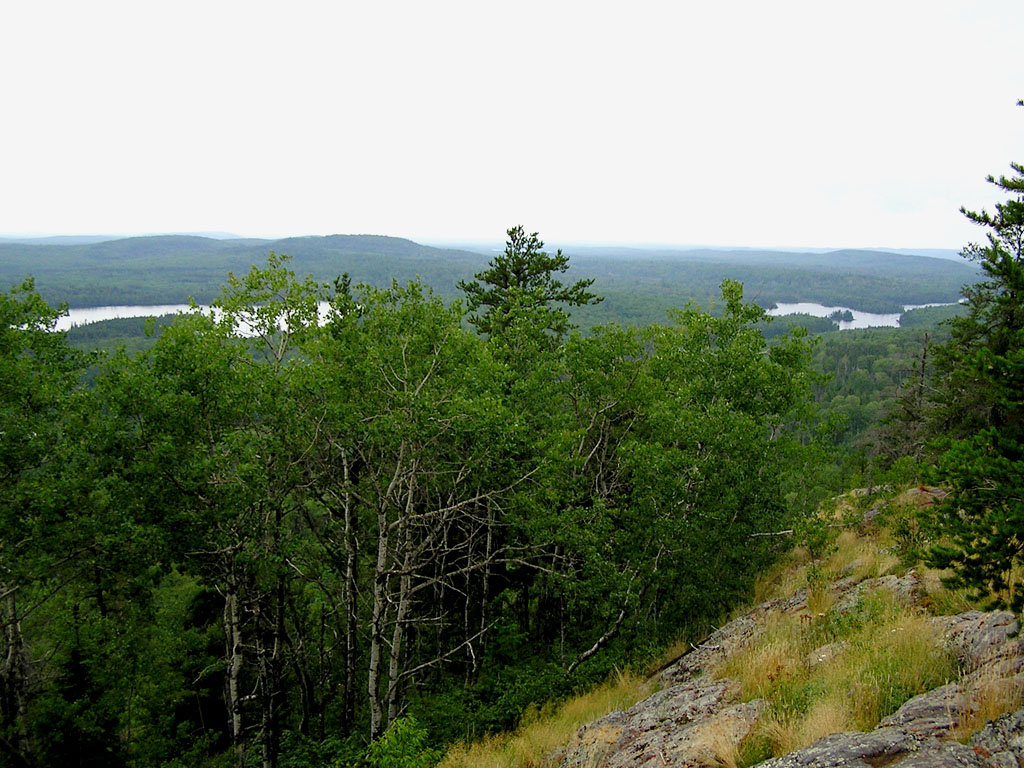
- This view from Eagle Mountain shows features of a peneplain; even in an area of significant local relief, the distant horizon is relatively flat.

- Location within the United States
- Location: Saint Louis, Lake, and Cook counties, Minnesota, U.S.
- Coordinates: 48°N 92°W
- Area: 3,900,000 acres (16,000 km^{2})
- Established: February 13, 1909
- Governing body: U.S. Forest Service
- Website: Superior National Forest

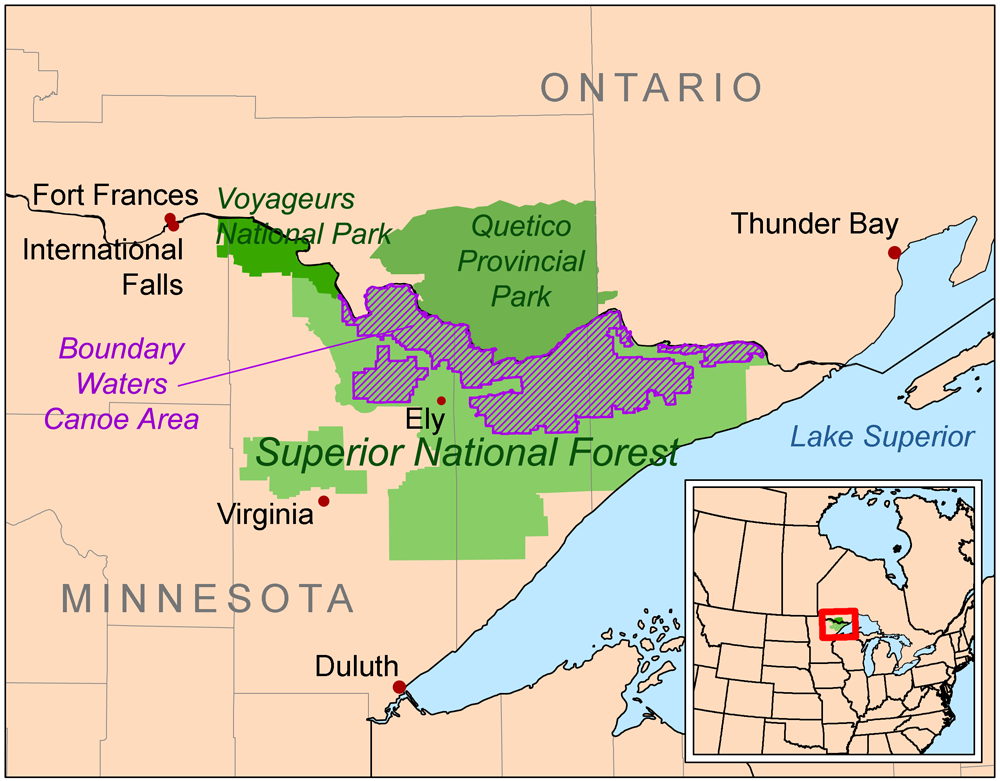
Location of the forest

The Superior National Forest, part of the United States national forest system, is located in the Arrowhead Region of the state of Minnesota between the Canada–United States border and the north shore of Lake Superior. The area is part of the greater Boundary Waters region along the border of Minnesota and the Canadian province of Ontario, a historic and important thoroughfare in the fur trading and exploring days of New France and British North America.

Under the administration of the United States Forest Service, the Superior National Forest comprises over 3,900,000 acres (6,100 mi^{2} or 16,000 km^{2}) of woods and waters. The majority of the forest is multiple-use, including both logging and recreational activities such as camping, boating, and fishing. Slightly over a quarter of the forest is set aside as a wilderness reserve known as the Boundary Waters Canoe Area (BWCA), where canoers can travel along interconnected fresh waters near land as well as over historic portages once used by Native American tribes and First Nations people, but later also by European explorers and traders.

== Location ==
The forest is located in Cook, Lake, and Saint Louis counties in northeastern Minnesota. Forest headquarters are located in Duluth, outside the boundaries of the forest. There are local ranger district offices in Aurora, Cook, Ely, Grand Marais, and Tofte.

== Landforms ==
The forest covers 3.9 million acres (6,100 mi^{2} or 16,000 km^{2}), and has over 445,000 acres (1,800 km^{2}) of water. Its waters include some 2,000 lakes and rivers, more than 1,300 miles (2,100 km) of cold water streams, and 950 miles (1,530 km) of warm water streams. Many of the lakes are located in depressions formed by the differential erosion of tilted layers of bedded rock; these depressions were given their final form by glacial scouring during recent ice ages.

The forest is located on part of the Canadian Shield. The area is on a low plateau which is part of the Superior Upland. High points include the Sawtooth Mountains, a range of hills along the shore of Lake Superior, the Misquah Hills including Eagle Mountain, the state's highest point, and other uplands along the Laurentian Divide separating the watershed of the Great Lakes and Atlantic Ocean from that of Hudson Bay and the Arctic Ocean. Despite the presence of dramatic cliffs and other local differences in elevation, the area is essentially flat, as it is part of an old peneplain eroded by weathering, water, and especially glaciers.

The principal surficial result of recent glaciation is not the deposition of glacial drift (unlike most of the rest of Minnesota), but the remodeling of the landscape by the scraping away of softer surfaces down to bare hard rock. The land therefore is raw, with many outcroppings of ancient bedrock, overlain in places by thin layers of gravelly soil and, in the west, silts deposited by Glacial Lake Agassiz.

== Life forms ==
=== Flora ===
The forest contains a small slice of true boreal forest (taiga), and a mixed conifer-hardwood forest known as the North Woods, a transition province between the northern boreal forest and deciduous forests to the south. While the forest is dominated by Conifers that include several varieties of pine, fir, and spruce trees, principal deciduous species such as mountain ash, maple, aspen and paper birch are also rather common, note the paper birch, one of the most numerous trees in the forest. Characteristic aquatic plants include water lilies and wild rice.

=== Fauna ===
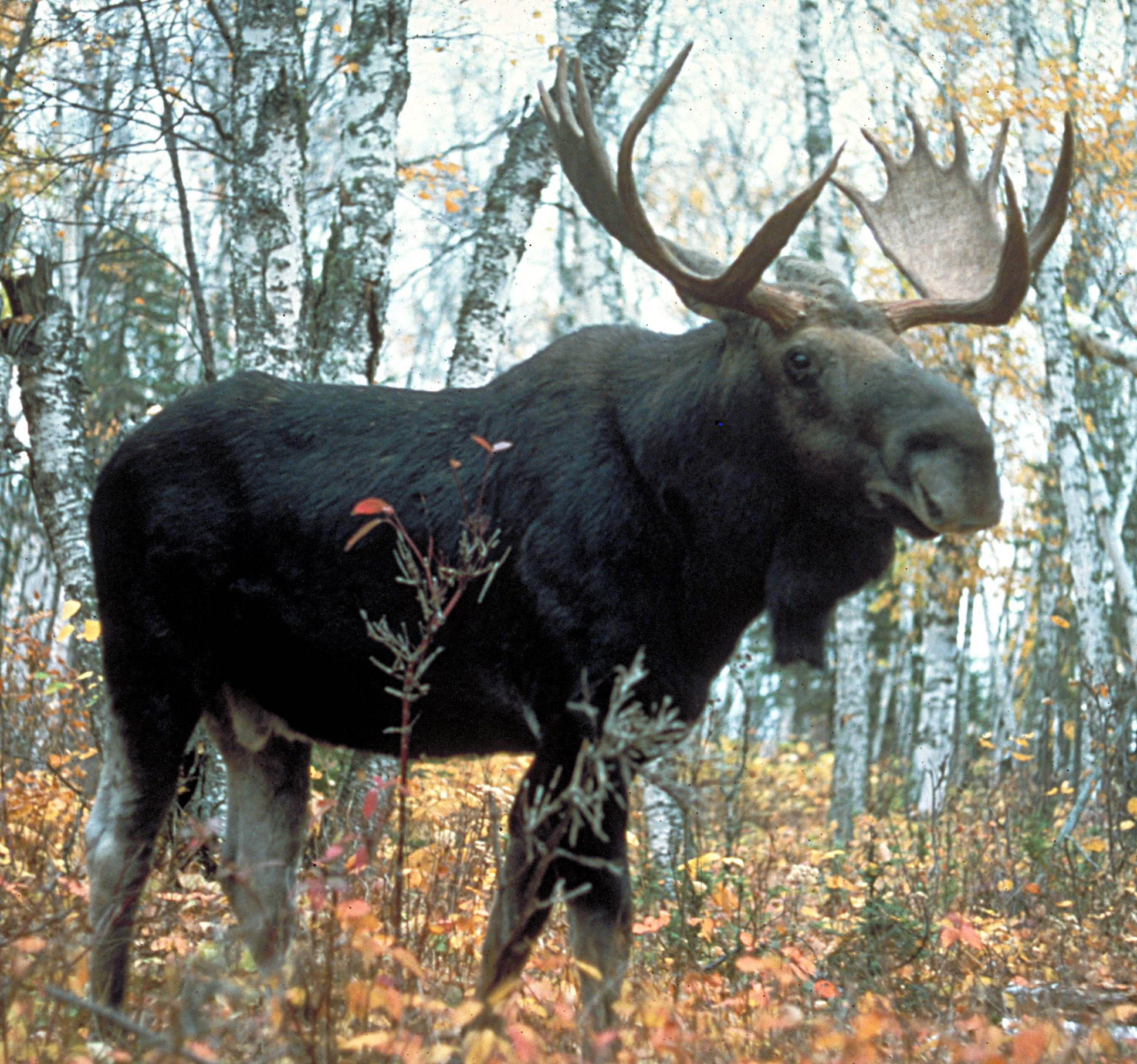
A bull moose in the park

Fish species such as walleye, northern pike, smallmouth bass, lake trout, brook trout, rainbow trout, and brown trout can be found in abundance in the forest's waters. Larger wildlife species include northern woodlands white-tailed deer, western moose, Canadian lynx, eastern black bear, and Great Lakes wolf packs. Northern Minnesota has the largest population of gray wolves in the lower 48 states, with approximately 300-400 wolves within the boundaries of this forest. Ely's International Wolf Center protects all North American gray wolves from extinction. Located at the northern edge of the range of the hummingbird and near the southern edge of the range of the Canada jay, this forest has 163 nesting species of birds, the largest number of any national forest. Species include the bald eagle and other raptors, the ubiquitous common loon, and northern waterfowl.

== Recreation ==
The Superior National Forest features a long segment of the 4,800-mile North Country National Scenic Trail from just south of Burntside Lake by Ely to just south of Temperance River State Park near Schroeder. This segment includes (from West to East) the Kekekabic Trail, Border Route Trail, and Superior Hiking Trail.

The Superior National Forest maintains developed fee campgrounds with amenities like drinking water and garbage disposal, rustic campgrounds without drinking water or fees, and backcountry campsites with only a pit latrine and a fire grate, and no permits or fees. Additionally, dispersed camping is permitted anywhere on undeveloped public land without permit or fee. An exception is made for the designated wilderness of the Boundary Waters Canoe Area, which requires special permits for entrance.

=== Fee campgrounds ===
Tofte Ranger District

- Crescent Lake
- Divide Lake
- Little Isabella River
- McDougal Lake
- Ninemile Lake
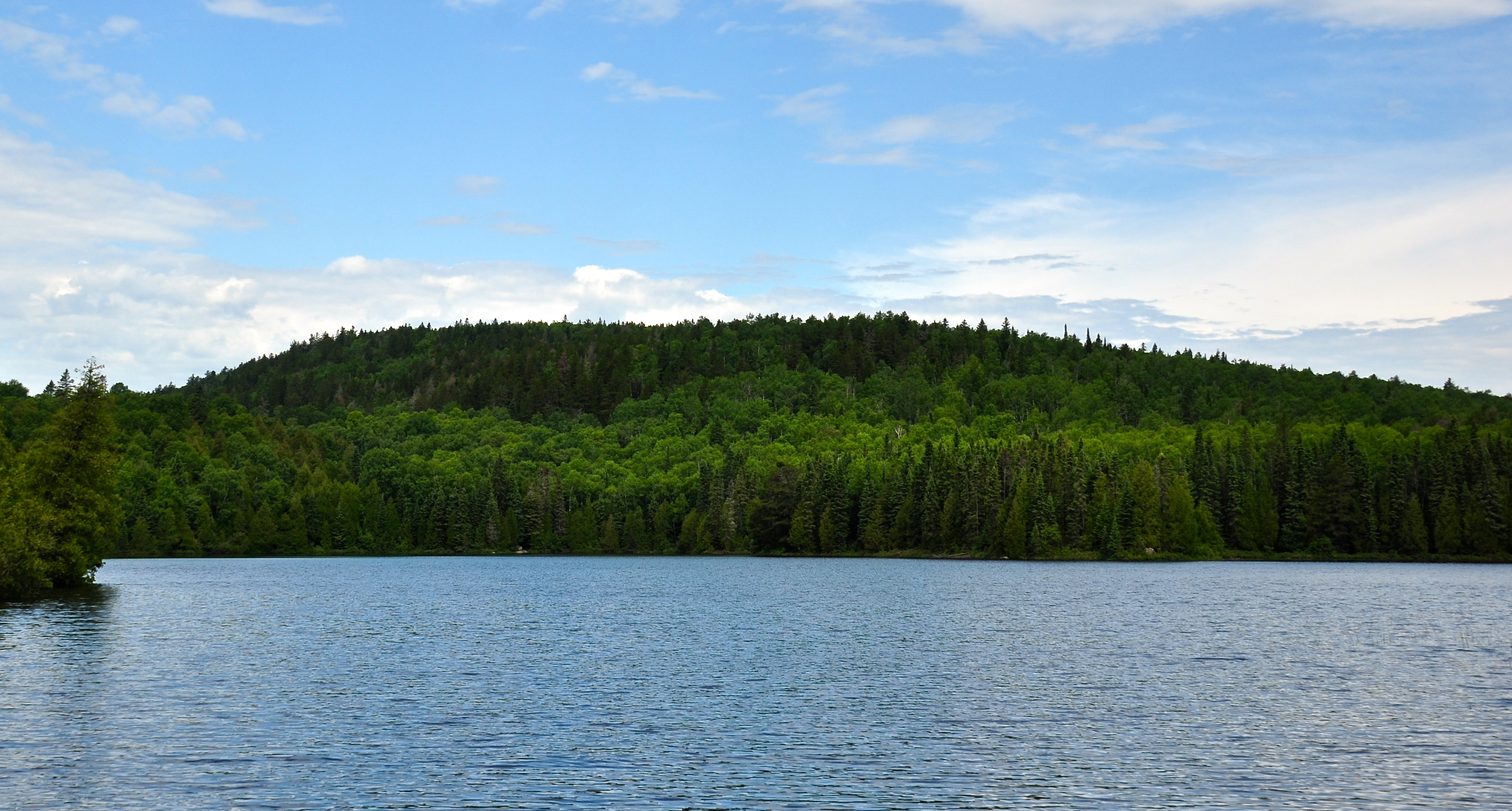
- Eagle Mountain, the highest natural point in Minnesota at 2,301 feet (701 m), is located in the Superior National Forest.
  Sawbill Lake
- Temperance River

== Mining ==
In January 2023, the Biden administration set a 20-year moratorium on mining in 225,000 acres of the forest that are upstream of the Boundary Waters Canoe Area Wilderness. The moratorium protects the waters of the Rainy River watershed from pollution and blocks the proposed Twin Metals mine.

In April 2026, the United States Senate voted to lift this ban three years into the 20-year moratorium. President Trump signed the lifted ban in April 2026.

== See also ==
- Boundary Waters Treaty of 1909
- Chippewa National Forest
- List of national forests of the United States
- List of wilderness areas of the United States
