= Eagle Mountain (Minnesota) =

Mountain in the American state of Minnesota

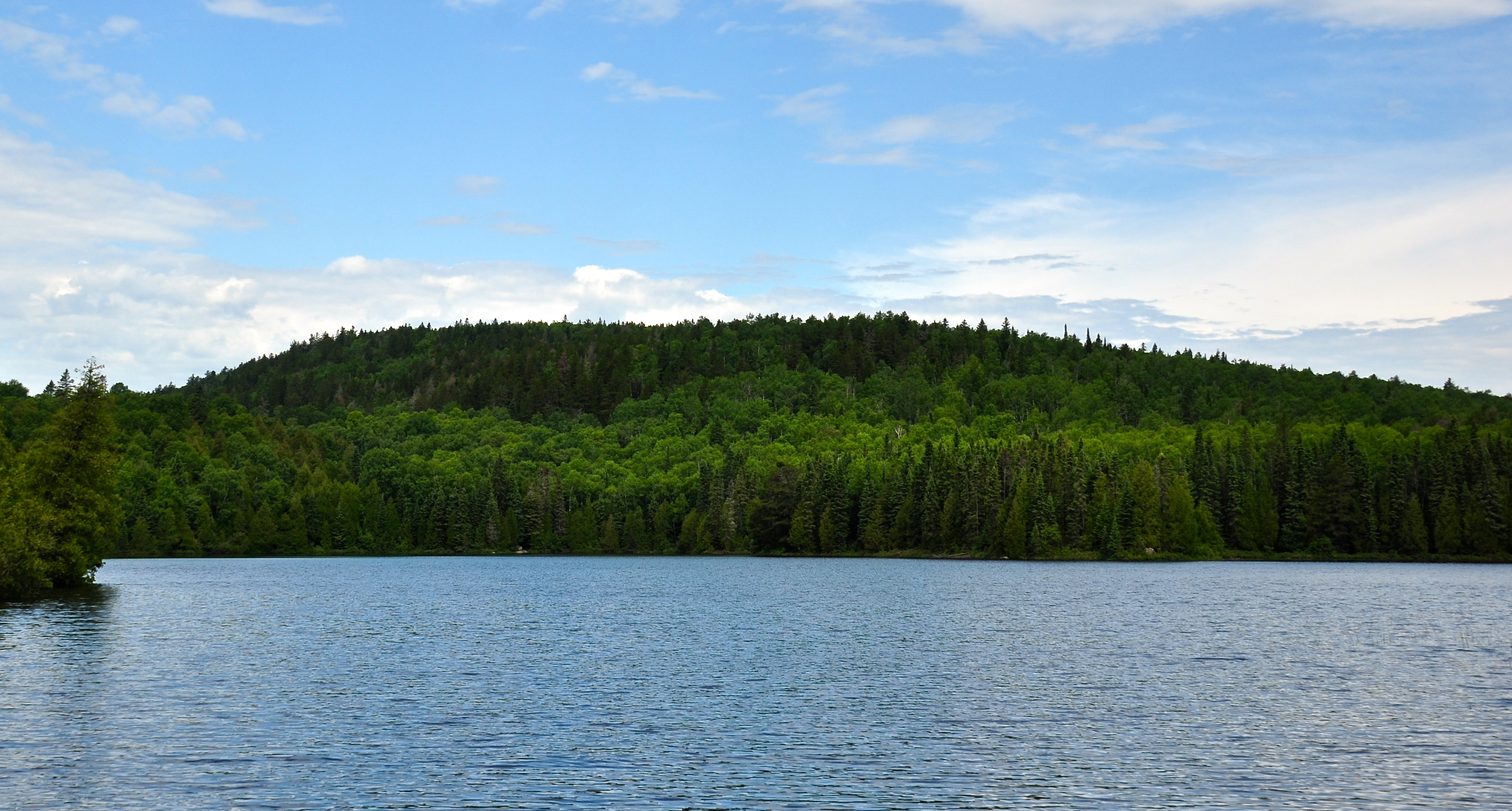
- The 2,301-foot Eagle Mountain, seen across Whale Lake. July 2014.

Highest point
- Elevation: 2,301 ft (701 m) NGVD 29
- Prominence: 1,321 ft (403 m)
- Listing: U.S. state high point 37th
- Coordinates: 47°53′51″N 90°33′36″W

Geography
- Location within Minnesota
- Location: Cook County, Minnesota
- Parent range: Misquah Hills
- Topo map: USGS Eagle Mountain

Climbing
- Easiest route: Maintained hiking trail

Eagle Mountain is the highest natural point in Minnesota, United States, at 2,301 feet (701 m). It is in northern Cook County in the Boundary Waters Canoe Area Wilderness and Superior National Forest in the Misquah Hills, northwest of Grand Marais. It is a Minnesota State Historic Site.

Eagle Mountain is only about 12 miles (19 km) from Minnesota's lowest elevation, Lake Superior, at 600 feet (183 m). It is part of the Canadian Shield. There is also another much shorter peak also named Eagle Mountain in northern Minnesota. The shorter peak is part of the Lutsen Mountains ski resort.

== Access ==
The hike to the summit can be made in about two and a half hours. The distance to the peak is about 3.5 miles (5.6 km) with an elevation gain of 550 feet (168 m). The trail is rocky and moderately strenuous. Whale Lake is about halfway along the trail and offers two campsites to hikers. The peak of the mountain is marked with a plaque.

Permits are required because portions of this hike enter the Boundary Waters Canoe Area Wilderness. Self-issued permits are available at any Superior National Forest ranger station or at the trailhead. Instructions and the permit can usually be found at the trailhead kiosk.

Among the highest natural points (highpoints) in each U.S. state, Eagle Mountain ranks 37th.

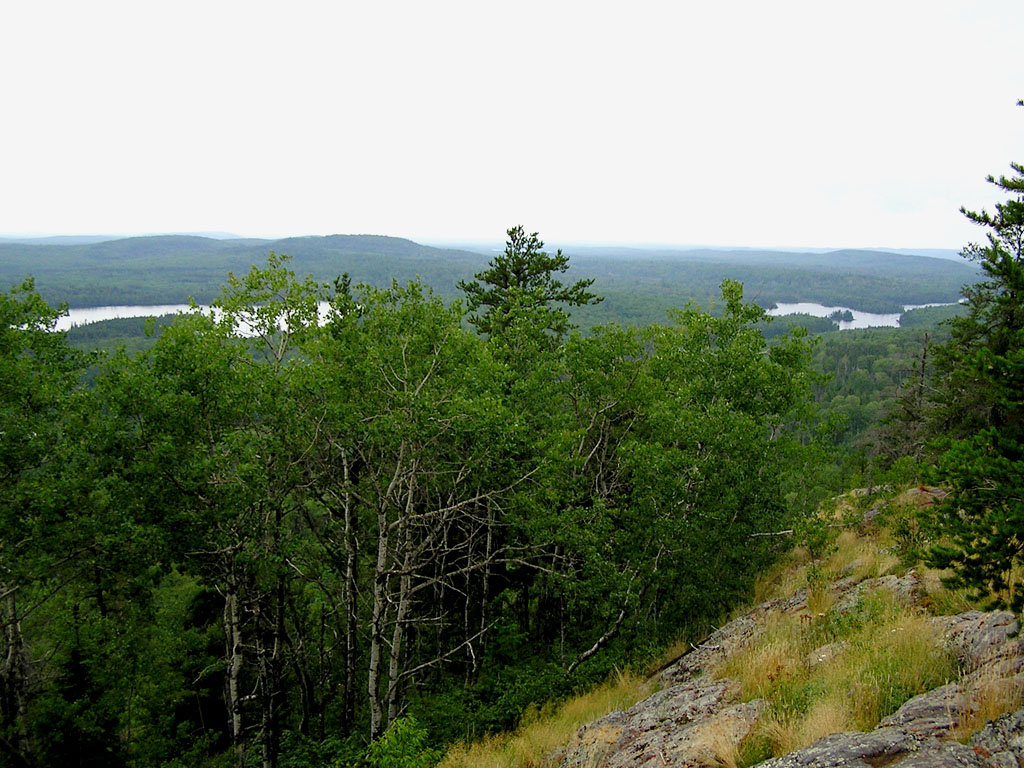
View from near the top of Eagle Mountain.

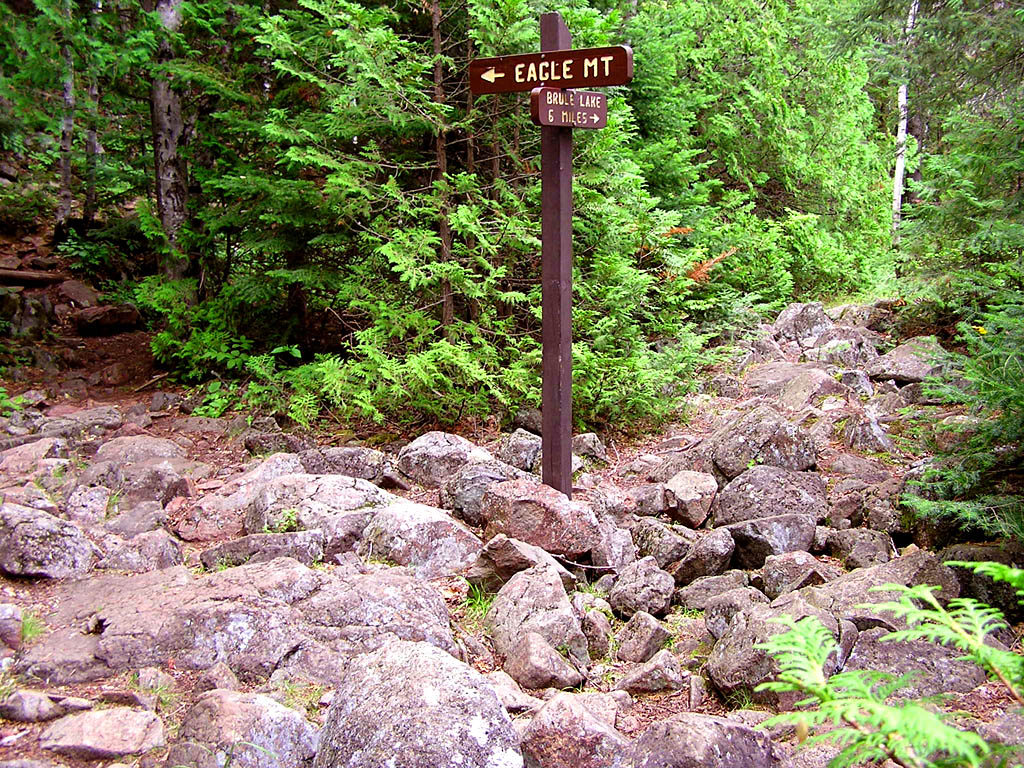
The rugged Eagle Mountain Trail at its junction with the trail to Brule Lake.

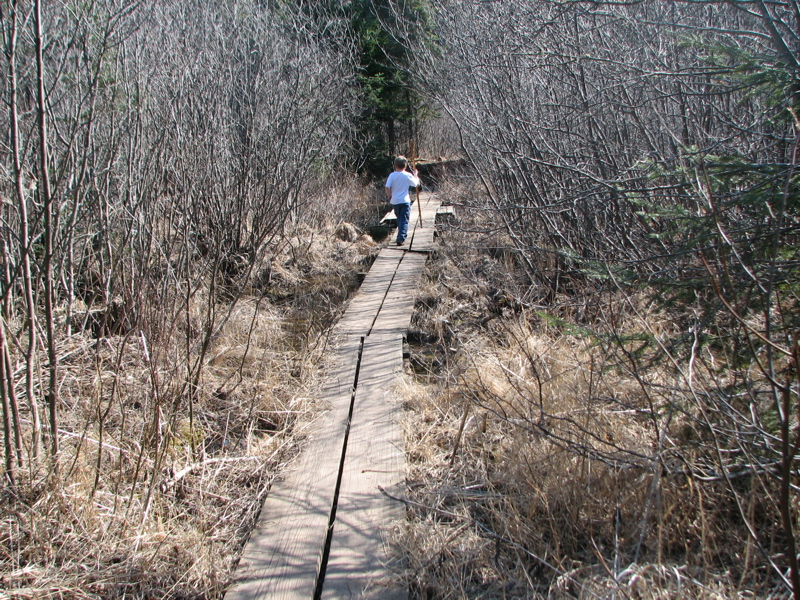
April hike to Eagle Mountain

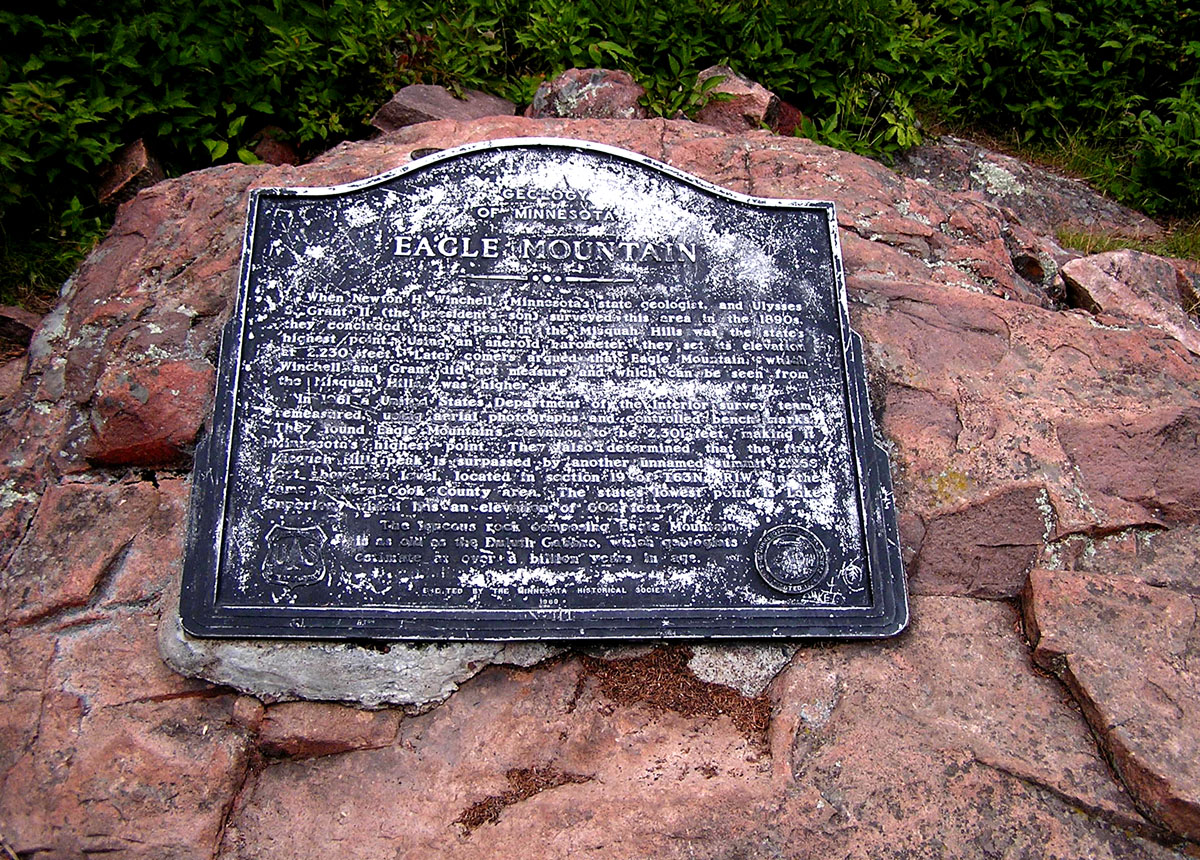
Plaque marking the peak of Eagle Mountain

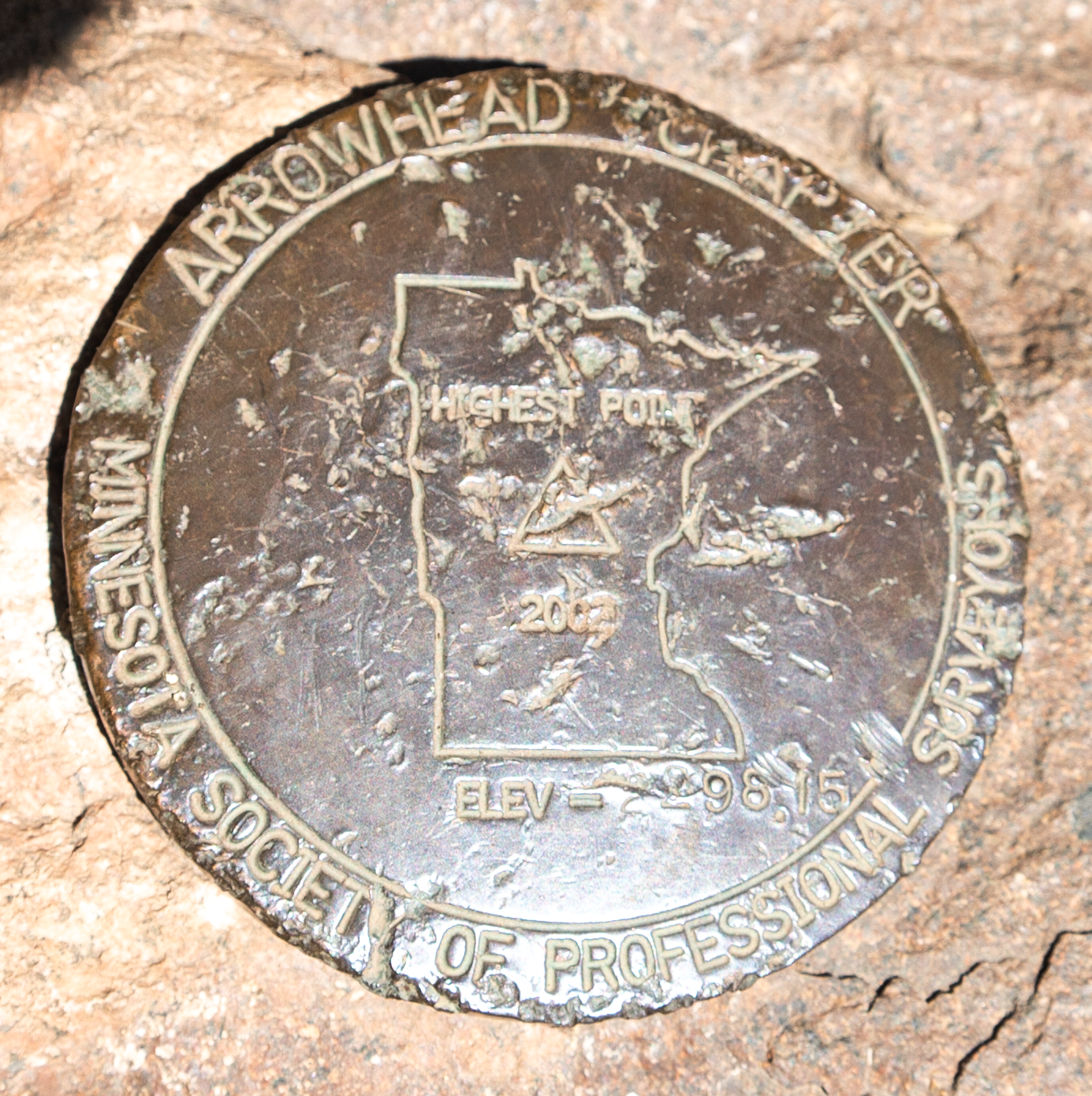
Eagle Mountain elevation marker

== See also ==
- List of mountains of Minnesota
- List of U.S. states by elevation
