= Camp House Fire =

2025 Minnesota wildfire

- Part of the 2025 Minnesota wildfires
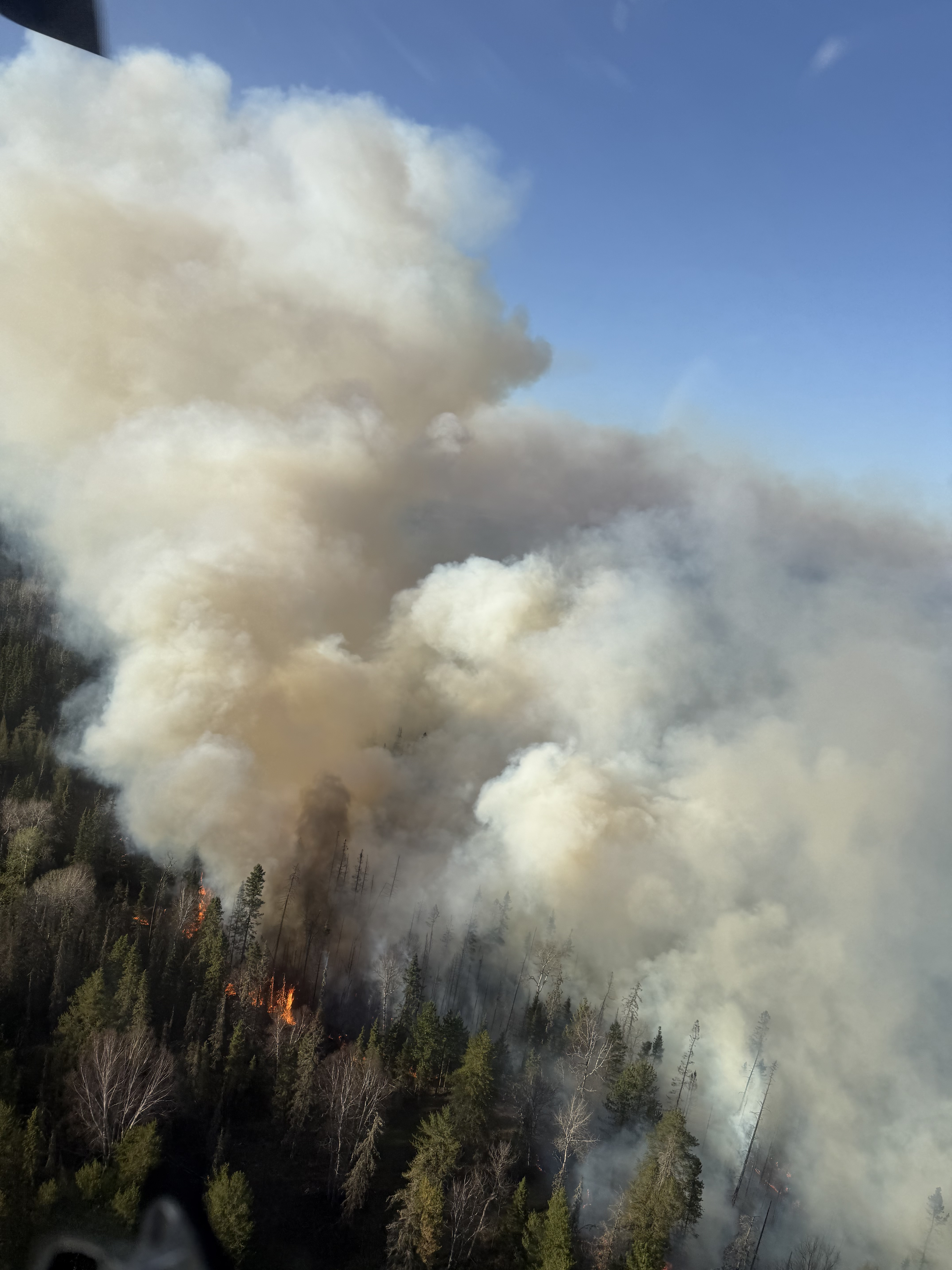
- Fire on May 13, 2025
- Date: May 11 -; June 13, 2025; (33 days)
- Location: Lake and St. Louis counties, Minnesota

Statistics
- Burned area: 12,071 acres (4,885 ha; 48.85 km^{2})

Impacts
- Deaths: 0
- Injuries: 0
- Structures destroyed: 144
- Cost: $8.7 million in suppression efforts (2025 USD)

Ignition
- Cause: Unattended campfire

Map
- Camp House Fire (map data)

The Camp House Fire was a large, destructive wildfire that burned 2 miles (3.2 km) northeast of Brimson, Minnesota. The fire started on May 11, 2025 from an unattended campfire, then quickly spread and destroyed 144 structures and burned 12,071 acres (4,885 ha; 48.85 km^{2}). The Camp House Fire burned alongside the Jenkins Creek Fire, and both fires were part of the Brimson Complex.

Unseasonably warm temperatures, dry fuel, strong winds, and increasing levels of drought fueled the fire's rapid spread. Additionally, balsam fir and spruce trees killed by the eastern spruce budworm. This caused the trees to lose their pine needles and dry up, providing ample fire fuel.

== Background ==
Around the time the Camp House Fire started, the region was experiencing unseasonable hot and dry conditions. Temperatures were over 90 °F at times, and strong winds played a key factor in the fire's rapid spread. The area was suffering from a low-level drought.

The Camp House Fire was fueled by dry timber and pine needles killed by the eastern spruce budworm. They feed on balsalm firs and spruce trees common in Superior National Forest, killing the plants. They dried up in the hot, drought-like conditions. Earlier that spring, there were concerns the budworms would create "tinderbox" fire conditions.

== Cause ==
The Minnesota Department of Natural Resources (DNR) investigated the area and determined the cause on May 14. The Camp House Fire ignited on May 11, 2025 from a campfire, which were prohibited at the time due to burn restrictions. Campers left the area where they started the campfire, and it was out of control by the time they returned. The fire cause was still listed as undetermined on May 21.

== Progression ==
=== May 11 – 22 ===
The Camp House Fire was first reported at about 1 pm on May 11, 2025 off Highway 44 near Camp House Road. It started during a red flag warning. The fire had grown to 200 acres (81 ha) by 3 PM. Evacuations were ordered for dozens of residents, and several structures were affected. The fire's size had increased to 750 acres (300 ha) that night. By May 12, there were local, state and federal crews battling the fire, and three homes or cabins were burned, along with several other outbuildings. The Camp House Fire reached 1,250 acres (510 ha) that evening, and evacuations were expanded in St. Louis County, and evacuations were first ordered in Lake County. Preparatory evacuations were also in place. There were several hot spots and flare-ups.

The Camp House Fire "exploded" that night, and had grown to 11,788 acres (4,770 ha), still 0% contained. The structure toll increased to 40, and there were warm temperatures above 80 °F. By now, Governor Tim Walz activated National Guard to combat the fire, along with the Jenkins Creek and Munger Shaw fires. The fire's size increased to over 12,000 acres (4,900 ha) overnight into the next morning, and 140 structures had been destroyed. It was considered "unpredicatable", and more evacuations had been ordered. County Route 44 and County Road 16 were closed. Crews were fighting the Camp House and Jenkins Creek Fires like a complex.

On May 15, the Camp House Fire had grown to 14,979 acres (6,062 ha). It was considered a "slower" fire growth day, but it spread to the south and east. Growth was mostly slowed by milder fire weather, including higher humidity and lower temperatures, but gusty winds and potential lightning remained a concern. 80 personnel were combating the fire, and more crews had been ordered. For operational purposes, the Camp House and Jenkins Creek Fires were designated as the Brimson Complex. The St. Louis County Sheriff's Office permitted evacuees to enter the evacuation zone that next day from 10 AM to 12 PM. The estimated size of the fire was lowered to 14,852 acres (6,010 ha). The number of personnel increased to 264.

Evacuees were also permitted to enter the properties from 10 AM to 12 PM on May 17. While dead foliage and downed power lines posed as hazards to firefighters, the acreage had decreased to 14,805 acres (5,991 ha) due to more accurate mapping and 28% containment was achieved. Bulldozers had improved containment lines on the south and west ends of the fire, and the containment number was credited to cooler, wetter conditions. Crews were prioritizing protection of a communications tower east of Bassett. Containment increased to 31% by May 18, with full containment along the northwest and southern edges of the fire. Size had reduced to 12,277 acres (4,968 ha), mostly due to cool conditions.

Highway 16, a major highway through Northeastern Minnesota, reopened May 19. Three evacuation zones had been reduced from "Go" evacuation orders to "Set" levels, allowing residents to go back to their homes. 40% containment was achieved, and more hand crews arrived, so other crews moved to more active areas on the Jenkins Creek Fire. While containment jumped to 59% with the Camp House Fire at a size of 12,107 acres (4,900 ha), using helicopters and drones to achieve the containment. However, a wind advisory was in effect until 1 AM May 21 and a red flag warning until 9 PM May 20. Winds would be blowing from 15–20 miles per hour (24–32 km/h), gusting up to 40 miles per hour (64 km/h), and humidity would be 15-20%.

Despite fire weather conditions, containment increased to 73% on May 21. Overnight rain cooled the Camp House Fire. Crews negotiated difficult terrain to complete containment lines, and others went into the perimeter to extinguish remaining hot spots. Tim Walz activated a peacetime emergency, which directed state agencies to provide any resources available to combat and recover from the fire. Thirteen evacuation zones were lowered from Go to Set status, and Highway 44 reopened. The fire's size decreased to 12,071 acres (4,885 ha) on May 22, and containment increased to 90%. 363 personnel were still combatting the blaze, and only a couple spots on the west and eastern edges of the fire remained uncontained. Firefighters flew drones over the perimeter to locate hot spots. All evacuations in Lake County were lifted, along with several other zones in St. Louis County, and several roads reopened.

=== May 23 onwards ===
All evacuation notices were lifted for the Brimson Complex on May 26. It was confirmed the Camp House Fire would not be fully contained until all heat would be detected inside the fire perimeter.

On May 28, management transitioned to the DNR, and 98% containment was announced on the final update on May 29.

On June 13, the Camp House Fire reached 100% containment, after burning 12,071 acres (4,885 ha).

== Effects ==
=== Damage ===
The Camp House Fire destroyed 144 structures, including 44 residential structures. Suppression efforts cost $8.7 million. Authorities searched for a woman whose house burned down, but she was found in safe conditions. A sled dog, who was born in 2022, died from stress after immediate evacuation from the fire.

=== Closures and evacuations ===
Superior National Forest issued an emergency closure for most of the Laurentian Ranger District, which affected campsites, trails, forest roads, and recreation areas. Highway 16 and Highway 44 were closed during the fire, along with portions of Forest Highway 11. Northeast Range School in Babbitt cancelled school and after-school activities from an air quality alert issued because of the fires.

There were numerous evacuation orders, warnings, and advisories throughout St. Louis and Lake Counties.

=== Environmental impacts ===
The Camp House Fire caused very unhealthy and hazardous air quality throughout Northern Minnesota. In Ely, the air quality reached 282, and the Minnesota Pollution Control Agency issued an air quality alert.

== See also ==
- 2025 United States wildfires
- Greenwood Fire
- Pagami Creek Fire
