= Sioux Trail =

Sioux Trail may refer to:

- Sioux Trail Township, Divide County, North Dakota
- Cut Foot Sioux Trail, a hiking trail in Minnesota
- Sioux-Hustler Trail, another hiking trail in Minnesota
- Sioux Trail elementary school in Burnsville, Minnesota
- Great Sioux Trail, a juvenile historical fiction book by Joseph Alexander Altsheler
