= Creek Fire (disambiguation) =

The Creek Fire was a large, destructive wildfire that burned in Fresno County and Madera County, California, in 2020.

Creek Fire may also refer to:

- Creek Fire (2006), a wildfire that burned in Lassen County, California, in 2006
- Creek Fire (2017), a destructive wildfire that burned in Los Angeles County, California, in December 2017
- Creek Fire (2025), a small wildfire near Big Tujunga Creek, part of the conflagration in January 2025 in Southern California

== See also ==
- Beachie Creek Fire, a part of a complex of three fires known as the Santiam Fire in northwest Oregon in September 2020
- Eagle Creek Fire, a destructive wildfire in the Columbia River Gorge — largely in Oregon with smaller spot-fires in Washington — that burned from September, 2017, to May, 2018
- Grizzly Creek Fire, a large wildfire that burned in Glenwood Canyon, Colorado, in 2020
- Pagami Creek Fire, a wildfire in northern Minnesota that began in August, 2011, becoming the largest naturally occurring wildfire in Minnesota in more than a century
- Witch Creek Fire, the second-largest wildfire of the 2007 California wildfire season
