= Hegman Lake Pictograph =

Native American pictographs in Minnesota

Coordinates: 48°3′16″N 91°54′12″W

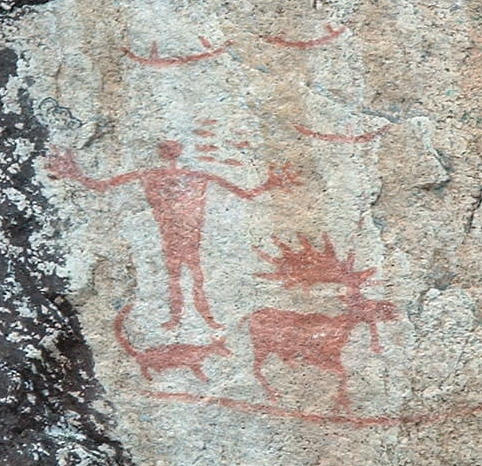
Pictographs at Hegman Lake, as they looked in 2003

The Hegman Lake Pictographs are a well-preserved example of a Native American pictograph, located on North Hegman Lake in the Boundary Waters Canoe Area Wilderness in Minnesota, USA. The rock art is considered "Perhaps the most visited and photogenic pictograph within the State of Minnesota."

== Historical Context and Age ==
The Hegman Lake Pictographs were created by the Ojibwe (Chippewa) people and are estimated to be 500-1,000 years old according to the U.S. Forest Service. While people have occupied the broader region for nearly 9,000 years, these specific pictographs represent a more recent artistic tradition created after the Ojibwe migrated to Minnesota.

== Artistic Technique and Materials ==
The pictographs were created using red ochre paint, made by mixing iron hematite with boiled sturgeon spine and bear grease. Ojibwe shamans typically applied the paint directly to the stone surface using their fingers, creating these enduring images on the granite cliff face.

== Cultural and Spiritual Significance ==
The pictographs are believed to have been influenced by vision quests and represent important spiritual insights within Ojibwe cosmology. The images reflect the Ojibwe people's close relationship with their natural surroundings and animal "brothers." Scholar Carl Gawboy, a member of the Bois Forte Reservation, has proposed that the pictographs may represent Ojibwe constellations, with the human figure with outstretched arms potentially representing the Winter-maker (equivalent to the Orion constellation), and other elements possibly depicting celestial patterns significant to Ojibwe astronomy and seasonal understanding.

== See also ==
- Boundary Waters Canoe Area Wilderness
