= 2025 Minnesota wildfires =

Natural disasters in the USA

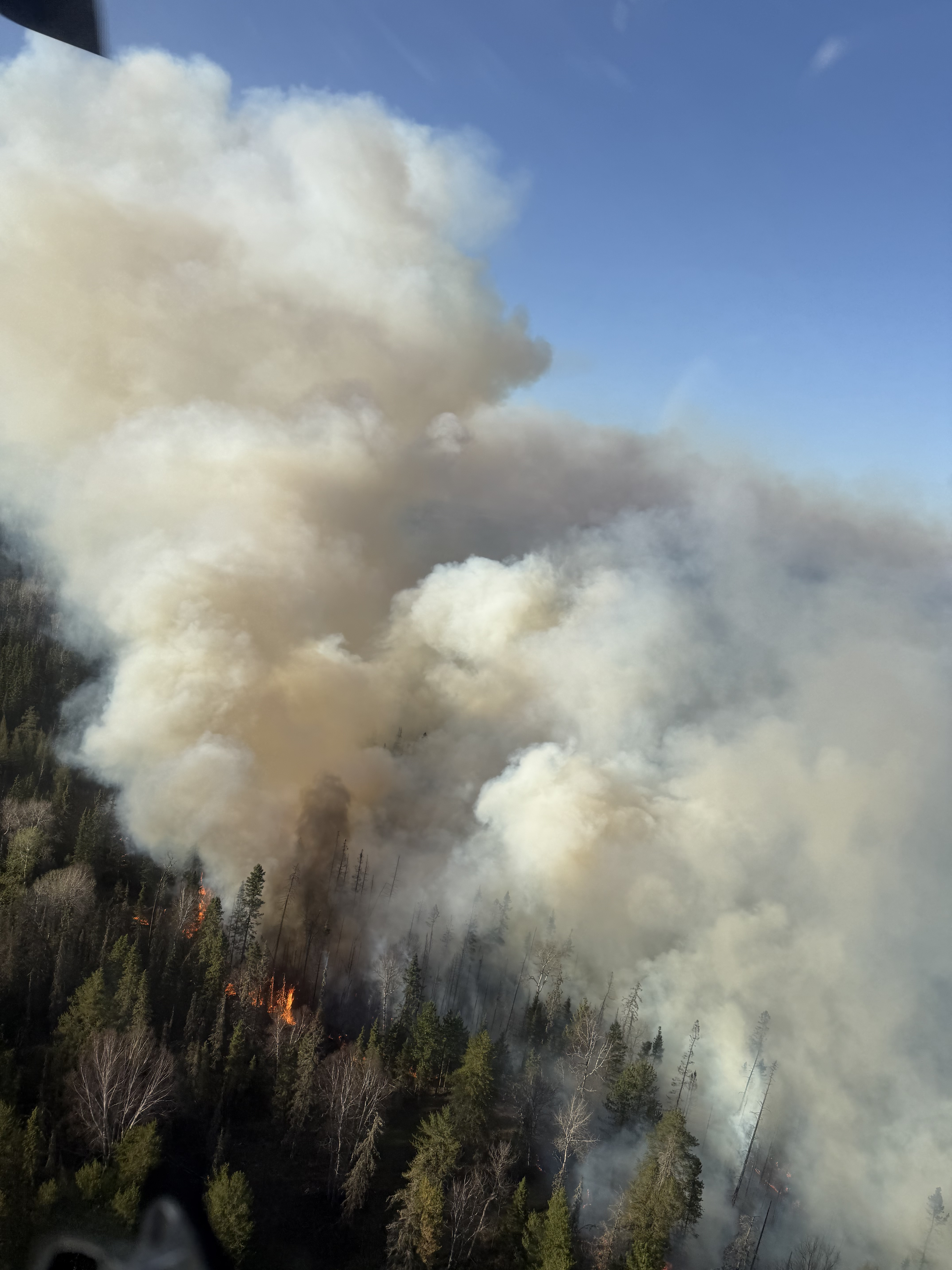
- The Camp House Fire on May 13

The 2025 Minnesota wildfires were a series of wildfires that burned in the U.S. state of Minnesota.

== Background ==
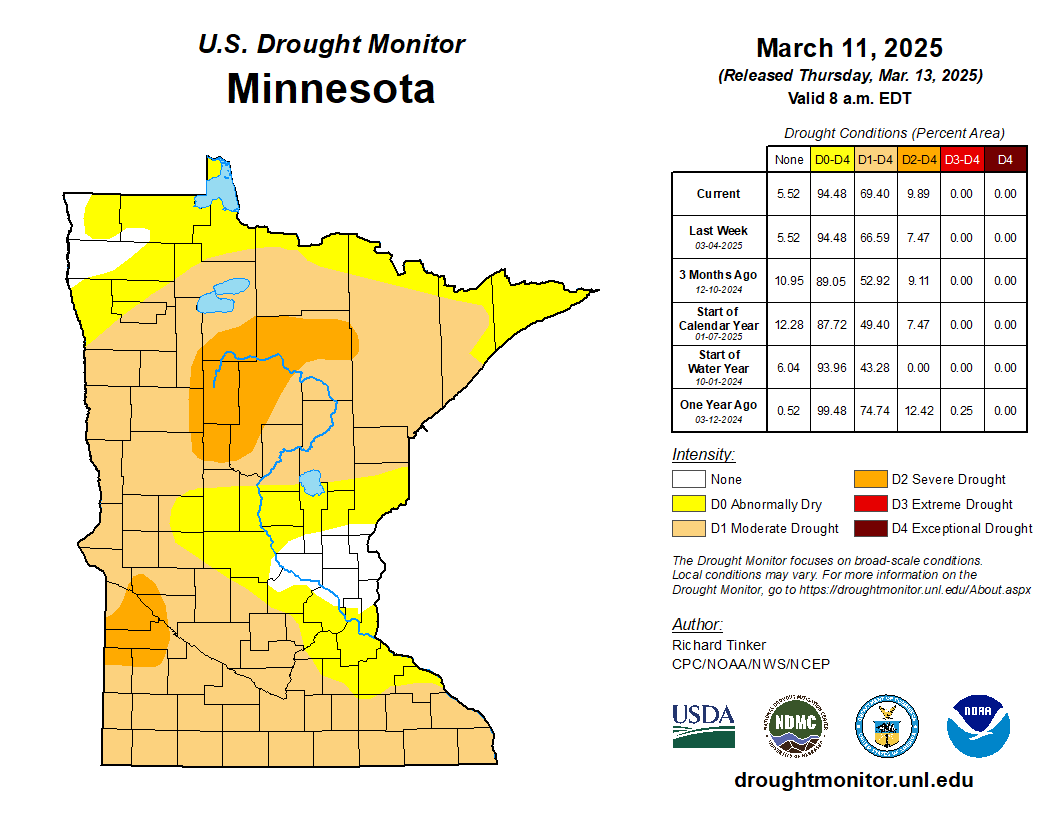
Minnesota Drought Monitor at its peak on March 11, 2025

While "fire season" varies every year in Minnesota, most wildfires occur in April and May. On average, over 1,500 wildfires occur each year, and 75% of those occur in those months. However, there is another small peak in fall. This happens when snow melts, so vegetation begins to dry out, and more dry and windy conditions lead to more fire activity. While precipitation can moisten vegetation, it quickly dries up within an hour. Dry winters can make vegetation much more vulnerable to wildfires.

== Summary ==
In early May, unseasonably warm temperatures, dry fuels, strong winds, and increasing levels of drought influenced the quick spread of the Camp House, Jenkins Creek, and Munger Shaw Fires, which collectively destroyed about 150 structures. The fires were fueled by balsam fir and spruce trees infested by the eastern spruce budworm. The budworms killed trees and made them drop pine needles at an "alarming rate." All of these conditions were considered "unprecedented", and Governor Tim Walz activated National Guard to combat the fires. The wildfires resulted in an air quality alert for Northern Minnesota. About 12,000 acres (4,900 ha) burn in Minnesota every year, but in May alone, these fires burned more than triple the average acreage, over 40,000 acres (16,000 ha).

== List of wildfires ==
The following is a list of fires that burned more than 1,000 acres (400 ha), produced significant structural damage, or resulted in casualties.

Name	County	Acres	Start date	Containment date (Note: Containment means that fire crews have established and secured control lines around the fire's perimeter. These lines are artificial barriers, like trenches or cleared vegetation, designed to stop the fire's spread, or natural barriers like rivers. Containment reflects progress in managing the fire but does not necessarily mean the fire is starved of fuel, under control, or put out.)	Notes	Ref.
Dugdale	Polk	3,744	April 9	April 11	Undetermined cause. Burned about 7 miles (11 km) southwest of Mentor.	
Partridge Two	Morrison	2,300	April 17	April 25	Human-caused. Burned about 8 miles (13 km) southeast of Pierz.	
Camp House	Lake, St. Louis	12,071	May 11	June 13	Destroyed about 150 structures along with the Jenkins Creek Fire, mostly residential and cabins, and led to evacuations near Brimson. Caused by an unattended campfire. Part of the Brimson Complex.	
Jenkins Creek	St. Louis	16,490	May 12	June 21	Caused by a discarded cigarette. Destroyed about 150 structures along with the Camp House Fire. Part of the Brimson Complex.	
Munger Shaw	St. Louis	1,259	May 12	June 16	Caused by a bale of hay that caught fire. Destroyed one structure.	

Perimeters of wildfires in the United States during 2025 (Red: >1000 acres) (map data)

== See also ==
- 2025 United States wildfires
