= Snowbank Lake (Minnesota) =

Lake in Minnesota, United States

- Location within Minnesota
- Location: Lake County, Minnesota
- Coordinates: 48°0′N 91°25′W
- Type: lake

Snowbank Lake is a lake in Lake County, in the U.S. state of Minnesota.

Snowbank Lake is an English translation of the native Ojibwe-language name.

== Climate ==
The weather station Ely 25E is on the southern edge of Snowbank Lake (Minnesota), a lake in the Boundary Waters Canoe Area Wilderness. Snowbank Lake has a dry winter humid continental climate (Köppen Dwb), bordering on a subarctic climate (Köppen Dfc).

Climate data for Ely 25E, Minnesota, 1991–2020 normals: 1444ft (440m)
Month	Jan	Feb	Mar	Apr	May	Jun	Jul	Aug	Sep	Oct	Nov	Dec	Year
Record high °F (°C)	47 (8)	62 (17)	76 (24)	81 (27)	94 (34)	96 (36)	99 (37)	97 (36)	93 (34)	84 (29)	72 (22)	51 (11)	99 (37)
Mean maximum °F (°C)	36 (2)	42 (6)	57 (14)	71 (22)	83 (28)	87 (31)	91 (33)	89 (32)	85 (29)	72 (22)	55 (13)	40 (4)	92 (33)
Mean daily maximum °F (°C)	15.1 (−9.4)	20.7 (−6.3)	34.0 (1.1)	46.8 (8.2)	62.1 (16.7)	72.0 (22.2)	77.2 (25.1)	75.1 (23.9)	65.7 (18.7)	49.8 (9.9)	33.2 (0.7)	20.1 (−6.6)	47.7 (8.7)
Daily mean °F (°C)	4.2 (−15.4)	8.4 (−13.1)	21.4 (−5.9)	35.5 (1.9)	50.1 (10.1)	60.8 (16.0)	66.0 (18.9)	63.8 (17.7)	55.0 (12.8)	41.0 (5.0)	26.0 (−3.3)	11.3 (−11.5)	37.0 (2.8)
Mean daily minimum °F (°C)	−6.7 (−21.5)	−3.9 (−19.9)	8.8 (−12.9)	24.1 (−4.4)	38.1 (3.4)	49.7 (9.8)	54.7 (12.6)	52.5 (11.4)	44.3 (6.8)	32.2 (0.1)	18.7 (−7.4)	2.5 (−16.4)	26.3 (−3.2)
Mean minimum °F (°C)	−29 (−34)	−26 (−32)	−16 (−27)	9 (−13)	27 (−3)	37 (3)	46 (8)	43 (6)	32 (0)	22 (−6)	2 (−17)	−20 (−29)	−32 (−36)
Record low °F (°C)	−45 (−43)	−41 (−41)	−32 (−36)	−12 (−24)	22 (−6)	29 (−2)	38 (3)	30 (−1)	26 (−3)	5 (−15)	−16 (−27)	−39 (−39)	−45 (−43)
Average precipitation inches (mm)	0.97 (25)	0.79 (20)	0.84 (21)	1.97 (50)	3.01 (76)	3.74 (95)	4.10 (104)	3.48 (88)	3.74 (95)	2.75 (70)	1.47 (37)	1.15 (29)	28.01 (710)
Average snowfall inches (cm)	15.70 (39.9)	14.10 (35.8)	7.90 (20.1)	9.80 (24.9)	0.40 (1.0)	0.00 (0.00)	0.00 (0.00)	0.00 (0.00)	0.00 (0.00)	1.90 (4.8)	9.90 (25.1)	17.20 (43.7)	76.9 (195.3)
Source 1: NOAA
Source 2: XMACIS (records & monthly max/mins)

== See also ==
- List of lakes in Minnesota
