= Boundary Waters Canoe Area Wilderness =

Wilderness area in Minnesota, United States

- IUCN category Ib (wilderness area)
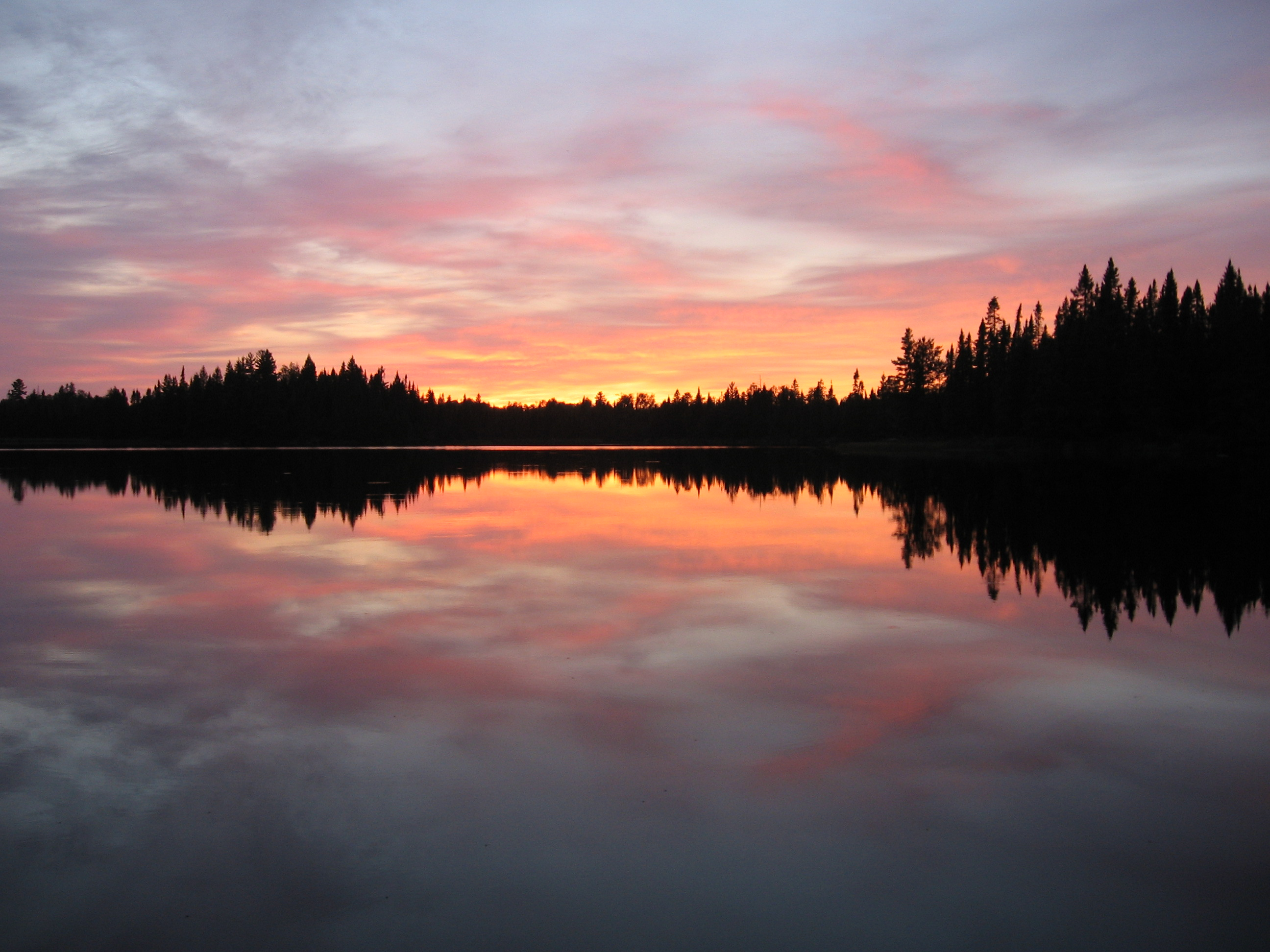
- Sunset over Pose Lake, a small lake accessible only by foot

- Location within the United States
- Location: Cook, Lake, Saint Louis counties, Minnesota, United States
- Nearest city: Ely, Minnesota; Grand Marais, Minnesota
- Coordinates: 48°N 91°W
- Area: 1,090,000 acres (4,400 km^{2})
- Established: 1978
- Visitors: 105,000 (in 2015)
- Governing body: U.S. Forest Service

The Boundary Waters Canoe Area Wilderness (BWCAW or BWCA) is a vast wilderness in the Superior National Forest of northeastern Minnesota. It comprises 1,090,000 acres (440,000 ha) of pristine forests, glacial lakes, and streams. Located at the Boundary Waters, it is administered by the United States Forest Service.

Efforts to preserve the primitive landscape began in the early 20th century and culminated in the Boundary Waters Canoe Area Wilderness Act of 1978. The area is a popular destination for canoeing, hiking, and fishing, and is the most visited wilderness in the United States.

== Geography ==
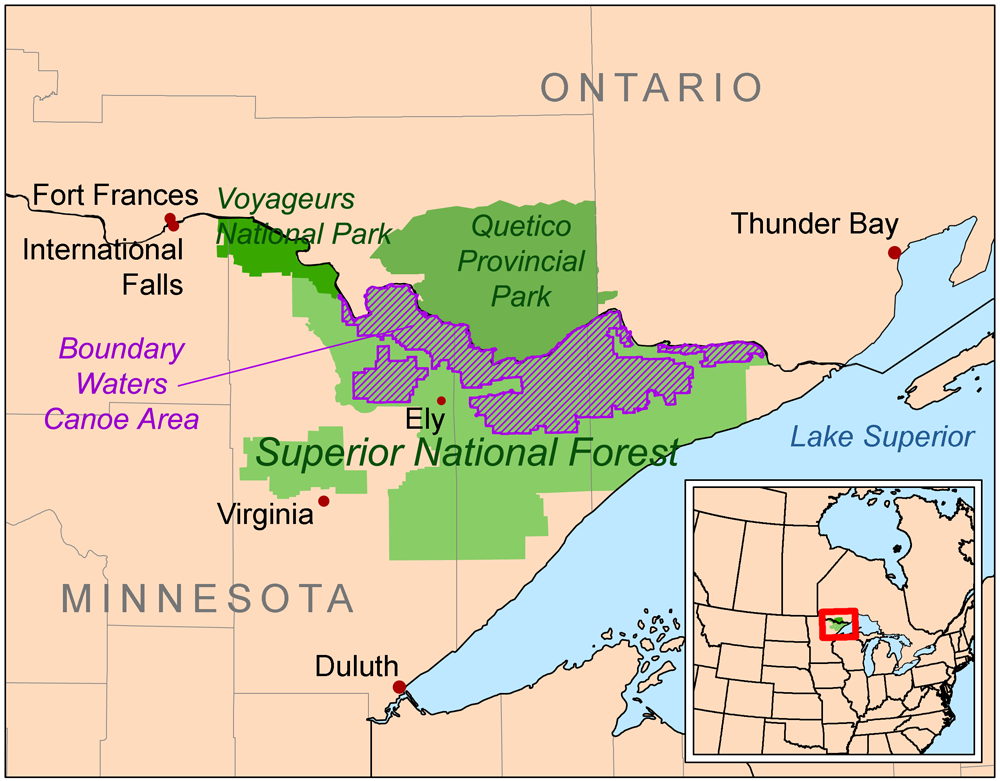
The BWCAW within the Superior National Forest

The BWCAW extends along 150 miles (240 km) of the Canadian border in the Arrowhead Region of Minnesota. The combined region of the BWCAW, Superior National Forest, Voyageurs National Park, and Ontario's Quetico and La Verendrye provincial parks make up a large area of contiguous wilderness lakes and forests called the "Quetico-Superior country", or simply the Boundary Waters. Lake Superior lies to the south and east of the Boundary Waters.

Nearly 20% of the BWCAW's total area, or 190,000 acres (77,000 ha), is water. Within the borders of the area are over 1,100 lakes and hundreds of miles of rivers and streams. Much of the other 80% of the area is forest. The BWCAW contains the largest remaining area of uncut forest in the eastern portion of the United States.

The Laurentian Divide between the watersheds of the Great Lakes and Hudson Bay runs northeast–southwest through the east side of the BWCAW, following the crest of the Superior Upland and Gunflint Range. The crossing of the divide at Height of Land Portage was an occasion for ceremony and initiation rites for the fur-trading Voyageurs of the 18th and early 19th centuries. The wilderness also includes the highest peak in Minnesota, Eagle Mountain (2,301 feet (701 m)), part of the Misquah Hills.

Located around the perimeter of the BWCAW are six ranger stations: in Cook, Aurora, Ely, Isabella, Tofte and Grand Marais. The two nearby communities with most visitor services are Ely and Grand Marais. Several historic roads such as the Gunflint Trail, Echo Trail (County Road 116) and Fernberg Road (County Road 18) allow access to many wilderness entry points.

=== Climate ===
The weather station Ely 25E is on the southern edge of Snowbank Lake (Minnesota), a lake in the Boundary Waters Canoe Area Wilderness. Boundary Waters Canoe Area Wilderness has a dry winter humid continental climate (Köppen Dwb), bordering on a subarctic climate (Köppen Dfc).

Climate data for Ely 25E, Minnesota, 1991–2020 normals: 1444ft (440m)
Month	Jan	Feb	Mar	Apr	May	Jun	Jul	Aug	Sep	Oct	Nov	Dec	Year
Record high °F (°C)	47 (8)	62 (17)	76 (24)	81 (27)	94 (34)	96 (36)	99 (37)	97 (36)	93 (34)	84 (29)	72 (22)	51 (11)	99 (37)
Mean maximum °F (°C)	36 (2)	42 (6)	57 (14)	71 (22)	83 (28)	87 (31)	91 (33)	89 (32)	85 (29)	72 (22)	55 (13)	40 (4)	92 (33)
Mean daily maximum °F (°C)	15.1 (−9.4)	20.7 (−6.3)	34.0 (1.1)	46.8 (8.2)	62.1 (16.7)	72.0 (22.2)	77.2 (25.1)	75.1 (23.9)	65.7 (18.7)	49.8 (9.9)	33.2 (0.7)	20.1 (−6.6)	47.7 (8.7)
Daily mean °F (°C)	4.2 (−15.4)	8.4 (−13.1)	21.4 (−5.9)	35.5 (1.9)	50.1 (10.1)	60.8 (16.0)	66.0 (18.9)	63.8 (17.7)	55.0 (12.8)	41.0 (5.0)	26.0 (−3.3)	11.3 (−11.5)	37.0 (2.8)
Mean daily minimum °F (°C)	−6.7 (−21.5)	−3.9 (−19.9)	8.8 (−12.9)	24.1 (−4.4)	38.1 (3.4)	49.7 (9.8)	54.7 (12.6)	52.5 (11.4)	44.3 (6.8)	32.2 (0.1)	18.7 (−7.4)	2.5 (−16.4)	26.3 (−3.2)
Mean minimum °F (°C)	−29 (−34)	−26 (−32)	−16 (−27)	9 (−13)	27 (−3)	37 (3)	46 (8)	43 (6)	32 (0)	22 (−6)	2 (−17)	−20 (−29)	−32 (−36)
Record low °F (°C)	−45 (−43)	−41 (−41)	−32 (−36)	−12 (−24)	22 (−6)	29 (−2)	38 (3)	30 (−1)	26 (−3)	5 (−15)	−16 (−27)	−39 (−39)	−45 (−43)
Average precipitation inches (mm)	0.97 (25)	0.79 (20)	0.84 (21)	1.97 (50)	3.01 (76)	3.74 (95)	4.10 (104)	3.48 (88)	3.74 (95)	2.75 (70)	1.47 (37)	1.15 (29)	28.01 (710)
Average snowfall inches (cm)	15.70 (39.9)	14.10 (35.8)	7.90 (20.1)	9.80 (24.9)	0.40 (1.0)	0.00 (0.00)	0.00 (0.00)	0.00 (0.00)	0.00 (0.00)	1.90 (4.8)	9.90 (25.1)	17.20 (43.7)	76.9 (195.3)
Source 1: NOAA
Source 2: XMACIS (records & monthly max/mins)

== Natural history ==
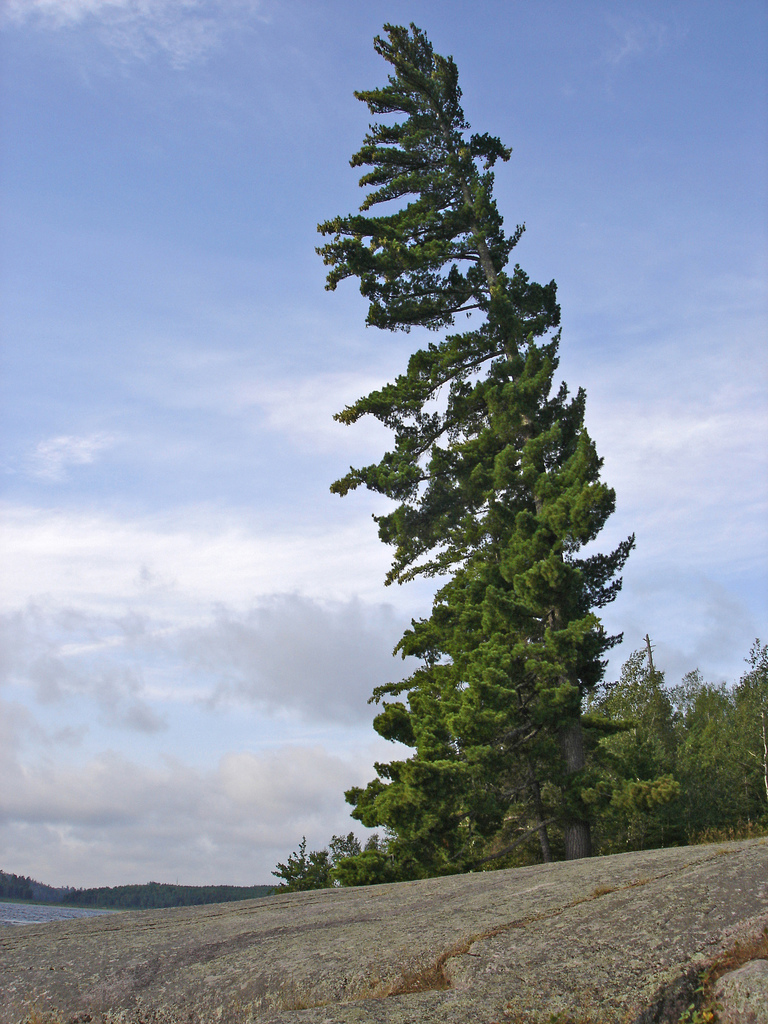
An eastern white pine growing on glacially scoured bedrock, Nina Moose Lake

=== Geology ===
The lakes of the BWCAW are located in depressions formed by differential erosion of the tilted layers of the Canadian Shield. For the past two million years, massive sheets of ice have repeatedly scoured the landscape. The last glacial period ended with the retreat of the Laurentide Ice Sheet from the Boundary Waters about 17,000 years ago. The resulting depressions in the landscape later filled with water, becoming today′s lakes.

Many varieties of Precambrian bedrock are exposed including: granite, basalt, greenstone, gneiss, as well as metamorphic rocks derived from volcanic and sedimentary rocks. Greenstone of the Superior craton located near Ely, Minnesota, is up to 2.7 billion years old. Igneous rocks of the Duluth Complex comprise the bedrock of the eastern Boundary Waters. Ancient microfossils have been found in the banded iron formations of the Gunflint Chert.

=== Forest ecology ===
The Boundary Waters area is near the border of the true boreal forest and the Laurentian Mixed Forest Province (commonly called the "North Woods"), a transitional zone between the boreal forest to the north and the temperate hardwood forest to the south that contains characteristics of each. Trees found within the wilderness area include conifers such as red pine, eastern white pine, jack pine, balsam fir, white spruce, black spruce, and white-cedar, as well as deciduous birch, aspen, ash, and maple. Blueberries and raspberries can be found in cleared areas. The BWCAW is estimated to contain 455,000 acres (184,000 ha) of old growth forest, woods that may have burned but have never been logged. Before fire suppression efforts began during the 20th century, forest fires were a natural part of the Boundary Waters ecosystem, with recurrence intervals of 30 to 300 years in most areas.

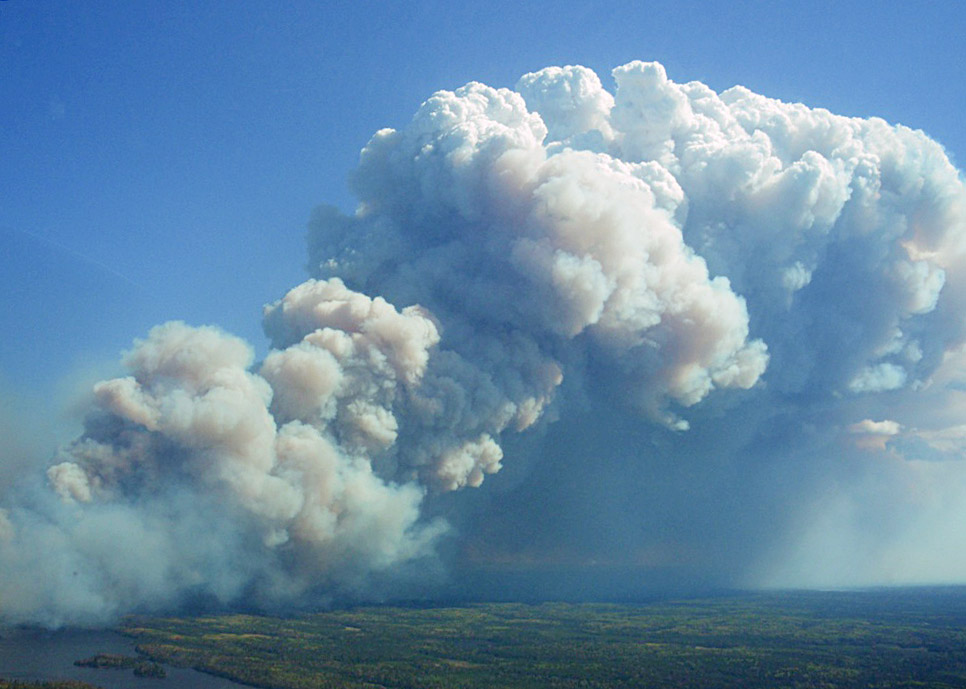
Smoke from the 2011 Pagami Creek Fire

On July 4, 1999, a powerful wind storm, or derecho, swept across Minnesota, central Ontario, and southern Quebec. Winds as high as 100 miles per hour (160 km/h) knocked down millions of trees, affecting about 370,000 acres (150,000 ha) within the BWCAW and injuring 60 people. This event became known officially as the Boundary Waters–Canadian derecho, commonly referred to as "the Boundary Waters blowdown". Although campsites and portages were quickly cleared after the storm, an increased risk of wildfire due to the large number of downed trees became a concern. The U.S. Forest Service undertook prescribed burns to reduce the forest fuel load in the event of a wildfire.

The first major wildfire within the blowdown area occurred in August 2005, burning 1,335 acres (540 ha) between Alpine Lake and Seagull Lake in the northeastern BWCAW. In 2006, two fires at Cavity Lake and Turtle Lake burned more than 30,000 acres (12,000 ha). In May 2007, the Ham Lake Fire started near the location of the Cavity Lake fire, eventually covering 76,000 acres (31,000 ha) in Minnesota and Ontario and becoming the most extensive wildfire in Minnesota in 90 years. In 2011, the Pagami Creek Fire grew to over 92,000 acres (37,000 ha), spreading beyond the wilderness boundary to threaten homes and businesses. Smoke from the Pagami Creek Fire drifted east and south as far as the Upper Peninsula of Michigan, Ontario, Chicago, Poland, Ukraine, and Russia. In 2021, it was closed due to wildfire for the first time since the 1970s, as the Greenwood Fire threatened access and spread rapidly to the south of its origin, and other smaller fires were burning within the wilderness.

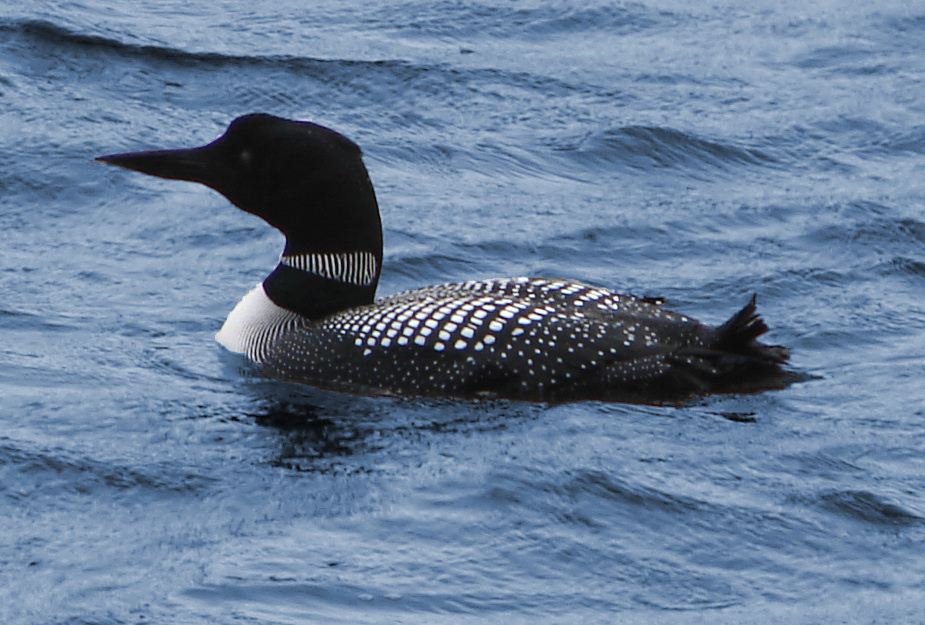
Common loon

=== Wildlife ===
Animals found in the BWCAW include white-tailed deer, western moose, beaver, Great Lakes wolves, black bears, Ruffed Grouse, bobcats, bald eagles, peregrine falcons, otters, and loons. It is within the range of the largest population of wolves in the contiguous United States, as well as an unknown number of Canada lynx. It has also been identified by the American Bird Conservancy as a globally important bird habitat.

Woodland caribou once inhabited the region but have disappeared due to encroachment by deer, and the effects of a brainworm parasite carried by deer which is harmful to both caribou and moose populations. Very rare sightings have been reported in nearby areas as recently as the 1980s.

== Human history ==
=== Native Americans ===
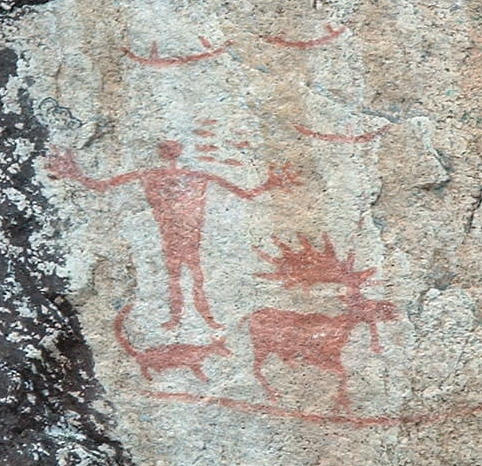
Pictographs at Hegman Lake, as they looked in 2003

The north country was inhabited by the Paleo Indian culture circa 8000 BC. Limited artifacts have been found in the BWCAW from that era and the subsequent Archaic period circa 6000 years ago. Artifacts from the Early Woodland Era (circa 1300 years ago) have not been found there, but pottery and clay pipes from the Later Woodland Indians have been found there.

The area was then sparsely populated by the Sioux. Then the Ojibwe arrived and the Sioux migrated westward. The area then became a part of the homeland of the Ojibwe people, who traveled the waterways in canoes made of birch bark. Within the BWCAW are hundreds of prehistoric pictographs and petroglyphs on rock ledges and cliffs. It is thought that the Hegman Lake Pictograph located on a large overlooking rock wall on North Hegman Lake was most likely created by the Ojibwe. The pictograph appears to represent Ojibwe meridian constellations visible in winter during the early evening, knowledge of which may have been useful for navigating in the deep woods during the winter hunting season. The Grand Portage Indian Reservation, just east of the BWCAW at the community of Grand Portage, is home to a number of Ojibwe to this day.

=== European exploration and development ===
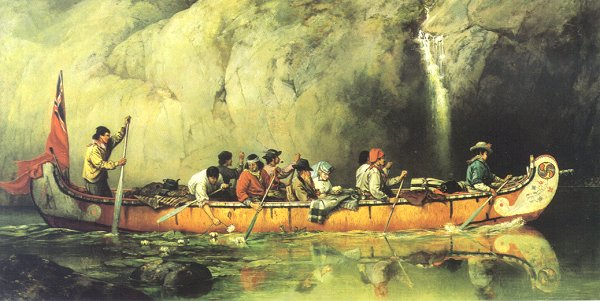
A Voyageur canoe during the fur trade era

In 1688 the French explorer Jacques de Noyon became the first European known to have traveled through the BWCAW area. Later, during the 1730s, La Vérendrye and others opened the region to trade, mainly in beaver pelts. By the end of the 18th century, the fur trade had been organized into groups of canoe-paddling voyageurs working for the competing North West and Hudson's Bay Companies, with a North West Company fort located at the Grand Portage on Lake Superior. The final rendezvous was held at Grand Portage in 1803, after which the North West Company moved its operations further north to Fort William (now Thunder Bay). In 1821 the North West Company merged with the Hudson's Bay Company and the center of the fur trade moved even further north to the posts around Hudson Bay.

During the late 18th and early 19th centuries, the area's legal and political status was disputed. The Treaty of Paris, which ended the American Revolutionary War in 1783, had defined the northern border between the United States and Canada based on the inaccurate Mitchell Map. Ownership of the area between Lake of the Woods and Lake Superior was unclear, with the United States claiming the border was further north at the Kaministiquia River and Canada claiming it was further south beginning at the Saint Louis River. In 1842, the Webster–Ashburton Treaty clarified the border between the United States and Canada using the old trading route running along the Pigeon River and Rainy River (today the BWCAW's northern border).

The BWCAW area remained largely undeveloped until gold, silver and iron were found in the surrounding area during the 1870s, 1880s and 1890s. Logging in the area began around the same time to supply lumber to support the mining industries, with production peaking in the late 1910s and gradually trailing off during the 1920s and 1930s.

=== Protection ===
In 1902, Minnesota's Forest Commissioner Christopher C. Andrews persuaded the state to reserve 500,000 acres (200,000 ha) of land near the BWCAW from being sold to loggers. In 1905 he visited the area on a canoe trip and was impressed by the area's natural beauty. He was able to save another 141,000 acres (57,000 ha) from being sold for development. He soon reached out to the Ontario government to encourage them to preserve some of the area's land on their side of the border, noting that the area could be "an international forest reserve and park of very great beauty and interest". This collaboration led to the creation of the Superior National Forest and the Quetico Provincial Park in 1909.

The BWCAW itself was formed gradually through a series of actions. By the early 1920s, roads had begun to be built through the Superior National Forest to promote public access to the area for recreation. In 1926 a section of 640,000 acres (260,000 ha) within the Superior National Forest was set aside as a roadless wilderness area by Secretary of Agriculture William Marion Jardine. This area became the nucleus of the BWCAW. In 1930, Congress passed the Shipstead-Newton-Nolan Act, which prohibited logging and dams within the area to preserve its natural water levels. Through additional land purchases and shifts in boundaries, the amount of protected land owned by the government in the area grew even further. In 1938, the area's borders were expanded and altered (roughly matching those of the present day BWCAW), and it was renamed the Superior Roadless Primitive Area.

Additional laws focused on protecting the area's rustic and undeveloped character. In 1948, the Thye-Blatnik Bill authorized the government to purchase the few remaining privately owned homes and resorts within the area. In 1949, President Harry Truman signed Executive Order 10092 which prohibited aircraft from flying over the area below 4,000 feet. The area was officially named the Boundary Waters Canoe Area in 1958. The Wilderness Act of 1964 organized it as a unit of the National Wilderness Preservation System. The 1978 Boundary Waters Canoe Area Wilderness Act established the Boundary Waters regulations much as they are today, with limitations on motorboats and snowmobiles, a permit-based quota system for recreational access, and restrictions on logging and mining within the area. That same year the Forest Service began referring to it as "BWCAW" to recognize its wilderness character.

=== Land use disputes ===
Some aspects of the BWCAW's management and conservation have been controversial. During the 1970s, a legislative proposal was made to loosen restrictions on motorized vehicles and allow some logging in parts of the BWCAW. The proposal was unsuccessful. During the mid-1990s, a dispute over using trucks to move boats between two portages required mediation. In 1998, using trucks was ultimately allowed. While snowmobiles are not allowed within the BWCAW, a snowmobile trail located 400 feet (120 m) from the border provoked a lawsuit in 2006. In 2015, a judge ruled that the snowmobile trail did not violate the Wilderness Act.

==== Proposed Twin Metals Mine ====
It has been known for decades that there are about four billion tons of copper and nickel ore, "one of the world's largest undeveloped mineral deposits", in the Duluth Complex, which underlies part of northeastern Minnesota. Resource companies have proposed mines south and west of the BWCAW upstream of the wilderness and within its watershed, leading to concerns that surface runoff could damage the wilderness. In December 2016 the federal government proposed banning mining for 20 years while the subject was studied. The Trump administration canceled the study in September 2018, clearing the way for mining leases in the national forest. The Antofagasta PLC subsidiary Twin Metals Minnesota would operate a proposed mine. In October 2021, the Biden administration filed an application for a "mineral withdrawal" that will put a hold on the development of the mine proposal while the environmental impacts are studied. The completed study could lead to a 20-year ban on mining upstream from the BWCAW.

== Recreation ==
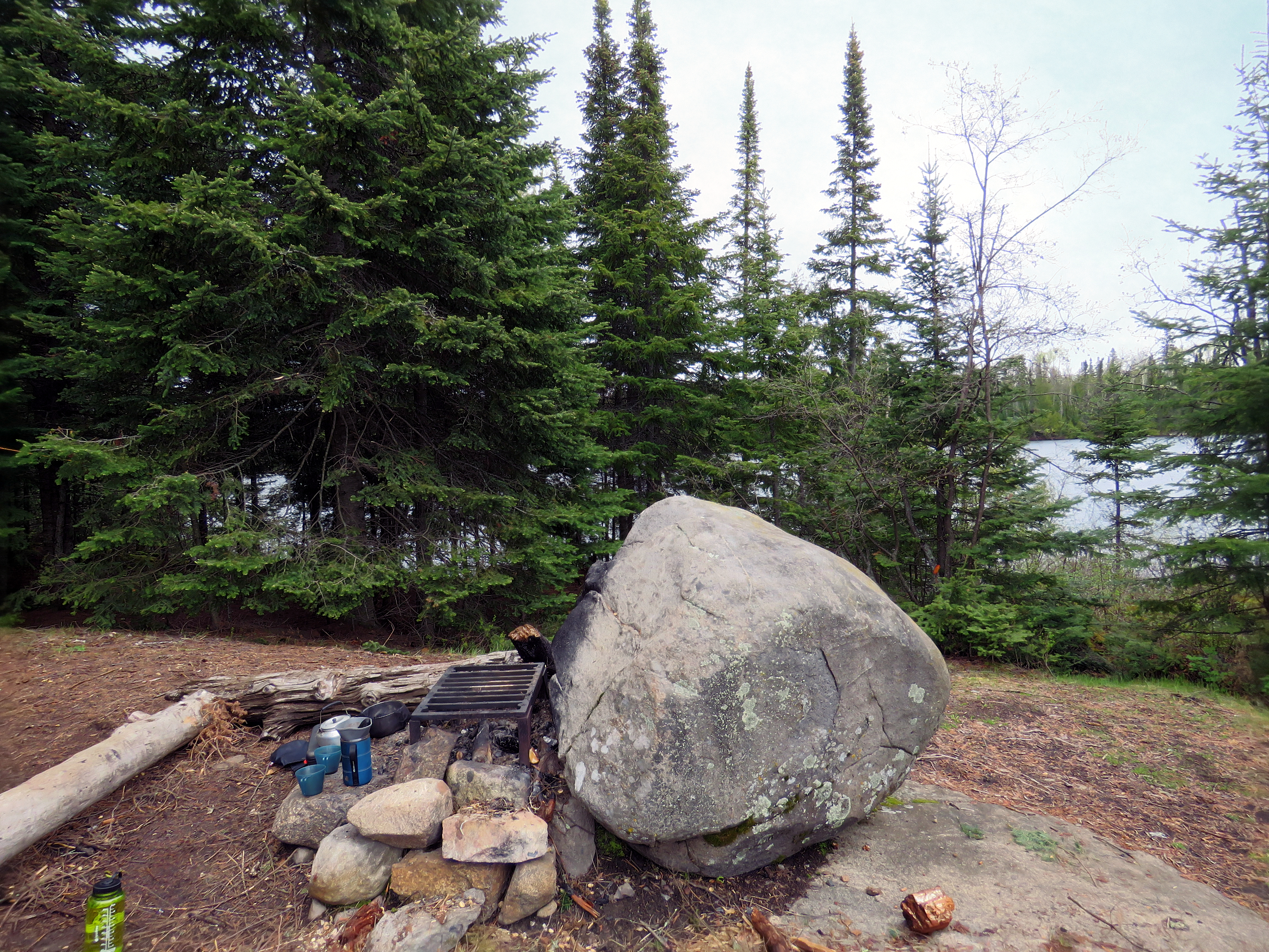
A fire area typical at wilderness campsites throughout the BWCAW

The BWCAW attracts over 150,000 visitors per year. It contains more than 2,000 backcountry campsites, 1,200 miles (1,900 km) of canoe routes, and 12 different hiking trails and is popular for canoeing, canoe touring, fishing, backpacking, dog sledding, and enjoying the area's remote wilderness character.

Permits are required for all overnight visits to the BWCAW. Quota permits are required for groups taking an overnight paddle, motor, or hiking trip, or a motorized day-use trip into the BWCAW from May 1 through September 30. These permits must be reserved in advance. Day use paddle and hiking permits do not require advance reservation and can be filled out at BWCAW entry points. From October 1 through April 30, permit reservations are not necessary, but a permit must be filled out at the permit stations located at each entry point. Each permit must specify the trip leader, the specific entry point and the day of entry. The permits are for an indefinite length, although visitors are only allowed one entry into the wilderness and cannot stay in one campsite for more than 14 nights.

=== Hiking ===
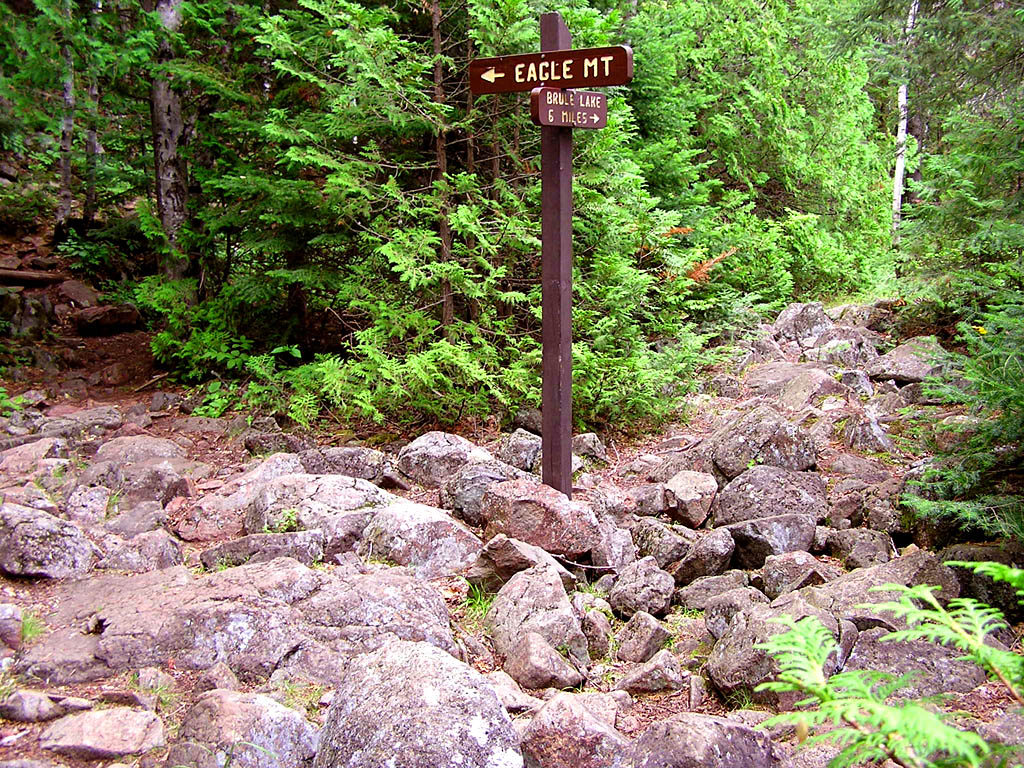
Junction of the Eagle Mountain and Brule Lake Trails

The BWCAW contains a variety of hiking trails. Shorter hikes include the trail to Eagle Mountain (7 miles (11 km)). Loop trails include the Pow Wow Trail, the Snowbank Trail, and the Sioux-Hustler Trail. The Border Route Trail and Kekekabic Trail are the two longest trails running through the BWCAW. The Border Route Trail runs east–west for over 65 miles (105 km) through the eastern BWCAW, beginning at the northern end of the Superior Hiking Trail and following ridges and cliffs west until it connects with the Kekekabic Trail. The Kekekabic Trail continues for another 39 miles (63 km), beginning near the Gunflint Trail and passing through the center of the BWCAW before exiting it near Snowbank Lake. Both the Border Route and the Kekekabic Trail are part of the longer North Country National Scenic Trail and together these represent the most remote segment of the NCT's 4,800 miles.

=== Canoeing ===
Canoeing or other non-motorized boating is the most popular method of exploring the BWCAW. A 2007 study found more than 94% of overnight visitors used a non-motorized boat to travel through the park. The BWCAW's size and abundance of campsites, lakes, rivers and portage trails allow for almost countless options for different routes. Many online maps and guidebooks offer suggested routes based on entry point, duration and difficulty.

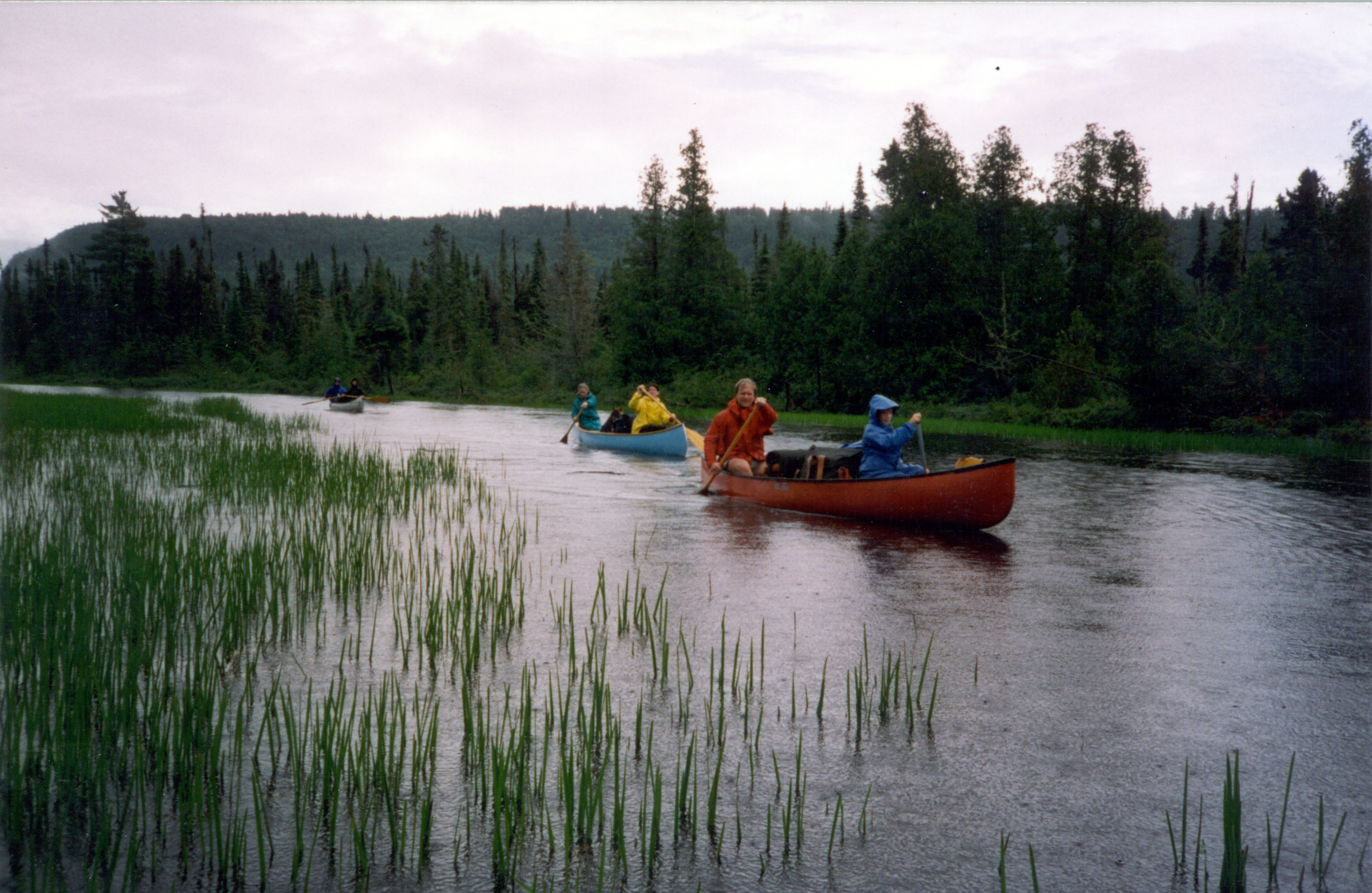
Canoe campers on a trip in the BWCAW

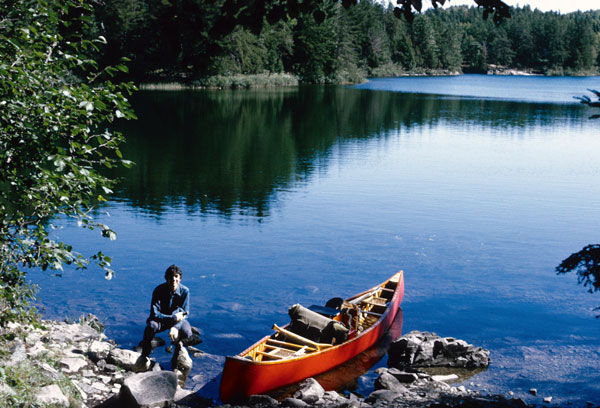
A BWCA paddler with her wood-and-canvas canoe

=== Fishing ===
Fishing is a popular activity in the BWCAW. Game species include northern pike, walleye, largemouth bass, smallmouth bass, and occasional panfish. Trout including brook trout, lake trout, rainbow trout and splake are also found. White sucker, burbot, and whitefish also occur. Limited stocking of walleye and lake trout is done on some lakes where natural recruitment is limited. The wilderness contains one of the largest concentrations of native lake trout lakes in the lower 48 states.

=== Night sky viewing ===
In 2020 the BWCA became a designated Dark Sky Sanctuary, one of 20 in the world. "It differs from other Dark Sky designations in that sanctuaries are the most remote and often darkest places in the world whose conservation state is 'most fragile'." The U.S. Forest Service had been working towards gaining this status for the BWCAW since 2008. According to the US forest service "This designation confirms what people in the area have enjoyed for thousands of years. Dark skies, starry nights, and astonishing northern lights displays have been part of the experience long before the area was designated wilderness..."

== Notable people associated with the BWCAW ==
- Benny Ambrose, one of the last two residents of BWCAW.
- Justine Kerfoot, local author and renowned outdoorswoman who moved to the Boundary Waters in 1928 and helped establish the Gunflint Lodge.
- Dorothy Molter, known as the "Rootbeer Lady", lived in the BWCAW for 56 years (alone after 1948) until her death in 1986, and was the last resident of the BWCA.
- Ernest Oberholtzer, is recognized today as a leading advocate for the preservation of the Quetico-Superior lake area and what would become the BWCA.
- Sigurd Olson, Minnesota author and conservationist, wrote extensively about the Boundary Waters and worked to ensure preservation of the wilderness.
