= Gunflint Lodge =

Lodge in Minnesota, United States

Coordinates: 48°5′5″N 90°45′0″W

Gunflint Lodge is one of the oldest and the best known lodges on the Gunflint Trail in Minnesota, United States. It is located on Gunflint Lake, on the border of Ontario, Canada, and is open year-round.

Built in 1925 by Dora Blankenburg and her son Russell Blankenburg, the lodge was sold in 1927 to May and Justine Spunner, and was owned by the Kerfoot family until it was sold by Bruce Kerfoot in 2016.The family name changed in 1934 when Justine married Bill Kerfoot and her name became Justine Kerfoot. After Justine retired in the mid-80s, the lodge was run by her son Bruce and his second wife Sue Kerfoot. They handed operations over to a son, Lee in 2001 through 2008. The Kerfoots announced their intentions to sell the lodge in 2013 and sold it in 2016.

Some of the most popular activities at the lodge are fishing and hiking, and in the winter, dogsledding, cross-country skiing and snowshoeing.

The lodge was threatened by the Ham Lake Fire in spring of 2007, but avoided any damage.

== Climate ==
Climate data for Gunflint Lake, Minnesota (1991–2020 normals, extremes 1961–present)
Month	Jan	Feb	Mar	Apr	May	Jun	Jul	Aug	Sep	Oct	Nov	Dec	Year
Record high °F (°C)	47 (8)	56 (13)	76 (24)	88 (31)	91 (33)	99 (37)	98 (37)	98 (37)	94 (34)	84 (29)	69 (21)	52 (11)	99 (37)
Mean maximum °F (°C)	36.0 (2.2)	41.4 (5.2)	54.8 (12.7)	68.3 (20.2)	81.8 (27.7)	84.8 (29.3)	88.6 (31.4)	87.5 (30.8)	82.1 (27.8)	70.8 (21.6)	51.5 (10.8)	38.5 (3.6)	90.6 (32.6)
Mean daily maximum °F (°C)	14.6 (−9.7)	20.3 (−6.5)	33.3 (0.7)	46.6 (8.1)	61.5 (16.4)	71.3 (21.8)	75.9 (24.4)	74.0 (23.3)	64.3 (17.9)	48.7 (9.3)	34.2 (1.2)	20.9 (−6.2)	47.1 (8.4)
Daily mean °F (°C)	4.1 (−15.5)	7.7 (−13.5)	20.8 (−6.2)	35.0 (1.7)	49.8 (9.9)	60.0 (15.6)	64.9 (18.3)	63.2 (17.3)	54.5 (12.5)	40.9 (4.9)	27.4 (−2.6)	12.2 (−11.0)	36.7 (2.6)
Mean daily minimum °F (°C)	−6.3 (−21.3)	−4.9 (−20.5)	8.2 (−13.2)	23.5 (−4.7)	38.0 (3.3)	48.8 (9.3)	53.9 (12.2)	52.3 (11.3)	44.7 (7.1)	33.2 (0.7)	20.6 (−6.3)	3.6 (−15.8)	26.3 (−3.2)
Mean minimum °F (°C)	−30.9 (−34.9)	−27.3 (−32.9)	−17.2 (−27.3)	5.2 (−14.9)	24.5 (−4.2)	34.6 (1.4)	43.5 (6.4)	40.9 (4.9)	30.5 (−0.8)	21.5 (−5.8)	0.6 (−17.4)	−21.1 (−29.5)	−33.6 (−36.4)
Record low °F (°C)	−44 (−42)	−43 (−42)	−35 (−37)	−17 (−27)	14 (−10)	27 (−3)	35 (2)	32 (0)	22 (−6)	5 (−15)	−26 (−32)	−40 (−40)	−44 (−42)
Average precipitation inches (mm)	1.03 (26)	0.79 (20)	1.00 (25)	1.92 (49)	2.93 (74)	3.61 (92)	3.68 (93)	2.79 (71)	3.51 (89)	2.68 (68)	1.57 (40)	1.15 (29)	26.66 (676)
Average snowfall inches (cm)	12.7 (32)	10.8 (27)	6.7 (17)	7.9 (20)	0.4 (1.0)	0.0 (0.0)	0.0 (0.0)	0.0 (0.0)	0.0 (0.0)	1.7 (4.3)	10.8 (27)	14.3 (36)	65.3 (164.3)
Average extreme snow depth inches (cm)	15.3 (39)	18.7 (47)	18.7 (47)	8.6 (22)	0.6 (1.5)	0.0 (0.0)	0.0 (0.0)	0.0 (0.0)	0.0 (0.0)	1.3 (3.3)	4.7 (12)	10.4 (26)	22.0 (56)
Average precipitation days (≥ 0.01 in)	8.0	6.0	6.1	8.0	11.3	12.9	11.2	10.8	11.2	12.1	9.8	8.5	115.9
Average snowy days (≥ 0.1 in)	8.2	5.9	4.0	3.5	0.4	0.0	0.0	0.0	0.0	1.4	5.7	8.4	37.5
Source 1: NOAA
Source 2: National Weather Service
