= Justine Kerfoot =

American outdoors-focused writer

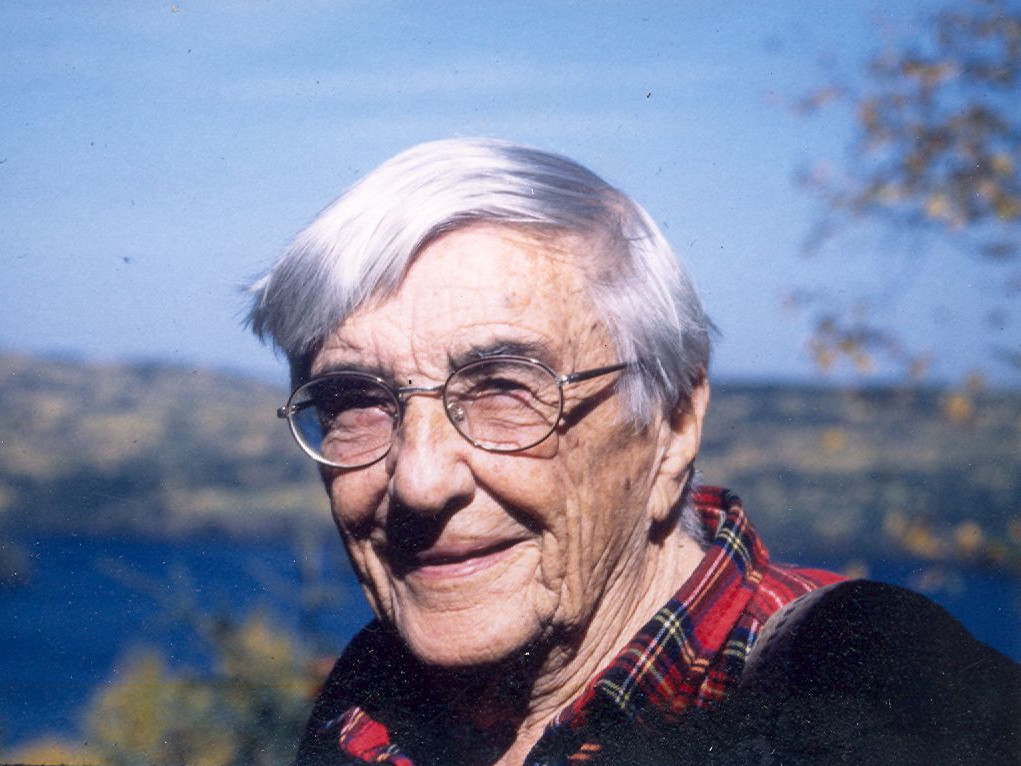
- Justine Kerfoot circa 1995
- Born: Justine Spunner; 1906; Barrington, Illinois, U.S.
- Died: May 30, 2001
- Education: Bachelors Degree in Zoology
- Alma mater: Northwestern University
- Occupations: author, editor
- Spouse: William "Bill" Kerfoot (m. 1934)
- Children: 4
- Writing career
- Language: English
- Genre: non-fiction
- Notable works: Woman of the Boundary Waters: Canoeing, Guiding, Mushing, and Surviving (Minnesota), Gunflint Reflections on the Trail

Justine Kerfoot (1906 – May 30, 2001) was an American writer and outdoors-woman who moved to the Boundary Waters in Minnesota in 1927 and helped establish the Gunflint Lodge and the overall Gunflint Trail area. She was the author of two published books and co-authored a third. She also wrote a column, "On the Gunflint Trail", that ran weekly for 42 years in the Cook County News Herald.

She fully experienced outdoor life in the wilderness in an around the Gunflint Lodge related to operation of the lodge, and visiting and traveling with the residents of the forest including trappers and Chippewa Indian families. She developed friendships with numerous Chippewa Indian families who lived north of the lodge on the Canadian border. They helped each other, traveled in the wilderness together, attended each other's celebrations and transacted business. They taught her wilderness skills.

In the foreword to the book Woman of the Boundary Waters, Les Blacklock referred to her as a hunter, electrician, trapper, canoeist, back-road world traveler, carpenter, beaver skinner, woodcutter, story teller, farmer, dogsled musher, naturalist, zoologist, neighbor helper, stranger helper, poet, telephone lineman, artist, poet, mechanic, newspaper columnist, and lodge builder and operator.

== Early life in the Chicago area ==
Justine Kerfoot was born in 1906 in Barrington, Illinois, to George W. and Mae (Lane) Spunner. She spent her early years in the Chicago area. Her father was a successful attorney.

She attended Northwestern University circa 1928. Spunner majored in zoology, minored in philosophy and chemistry, played soccer and volleyball, and joined the Outing Club at Northwestern. She planned to go to medical school and become a doctor. She graduated with a degree in zoology and finished one year of graduate study before moving to Gunflint Lake in 1928.

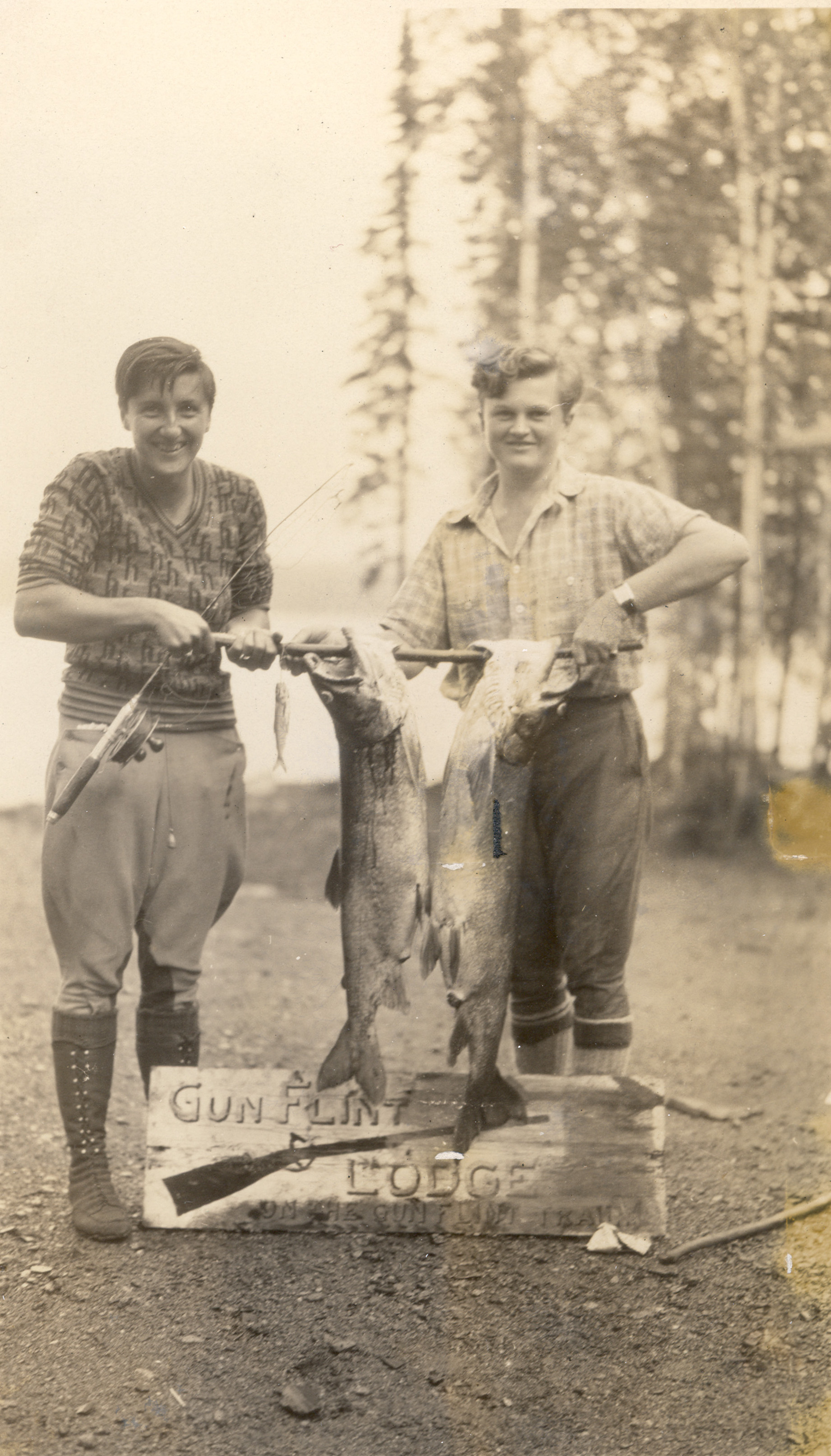
Justine Kerfoot circa 1940

== Life in the north woods ==
Justine's mother bought the Gunflint Lodge in 1927 or 1928. Mae Spunner brought her daughter, Justine, up with her when she was considering purchase of the resort from Dora Blankenburg. While the two women discussed and finalized the matter, Justine took her first canoe trip with someone who was a college friend and a guide. They went down Granite River to Saganaga Lake. At the time Justine had just finished her undergraduate work and planned to become a physician. Justine had agreed with her mother to come up during the summers while in school and help her run the resort.

During the Great Depression her family lost almost everything except for the lodge. They moved to the lodge which had no plumbing or electricity. Justine learned how to put the plumbing in herself. She also learned how to mush sled dogs, repair cars, fix telephone lines, build furniture, and fur trapping.

At the time of the purchase it was five cabins plus small lodge building with a store carrying supplies for the Indians and fishing tackle for the guests, plus a dining room to serve meals. She developed friendships with numerous Chippewa Indian families who lived north of the lodge on the Canadian border. After five years of associating with them they trusted her. They helped each other, attended each other's celebrations and transacted business. They taught her wilderness skills.

She met Bill Kerfoot, the son of Hamline University's president, whose foreign service ambitions were dashed in the Depression camped on a beach, desperate for work. Justine offered him room and board in exchange for resort work. In 1934 she married Bill Kerfoot. They had three children: Neal (1935–1935), Bruce, Pat and Sharon. She once led a winter hunting trip while eight months pregnant. The couple eventually divorced. In 1953, the lodge burned and the family rebuilt it. Their son Bruce bought the lodge from his parents in the late 1960s; he ran it and in 2013 announced his intentions to sell it. He ran it until he sold it in 2016 (except for handed operations over to a son, Robert, in 2001, but took back control in 2008.)

Kerfoot played an important role in the shaping of the Gunflint Trail. She served as Cook County Commissioner from 1965 to 1968, serving as chair in 1968. She was unhappy about the extension of the Gunflint Trail to Saganaga Lake via a toll road on private property.

She portaged her own canoe until she was 90 years old. Her canoe is on display at the Chik-Wauk Museum & Nature Center. She died on May 30, 2001, at age 94, having visited the Amazon and Antarctica.

In the foreword to the book Woman of the Boundary Waters, Les Blacklock referred to her as a hunter, electrician, trapper, canoeist, back-road world traveler, carpenter, beaver skinner, woodcutter, story teller, farmer, dogsled musher, naturalist, zoologist, neighbor helper, stranger helper, poet, telephone lineman, artist, poet, mechanic, newspaper columnist, and lodge builder and operator.

== As an author ==
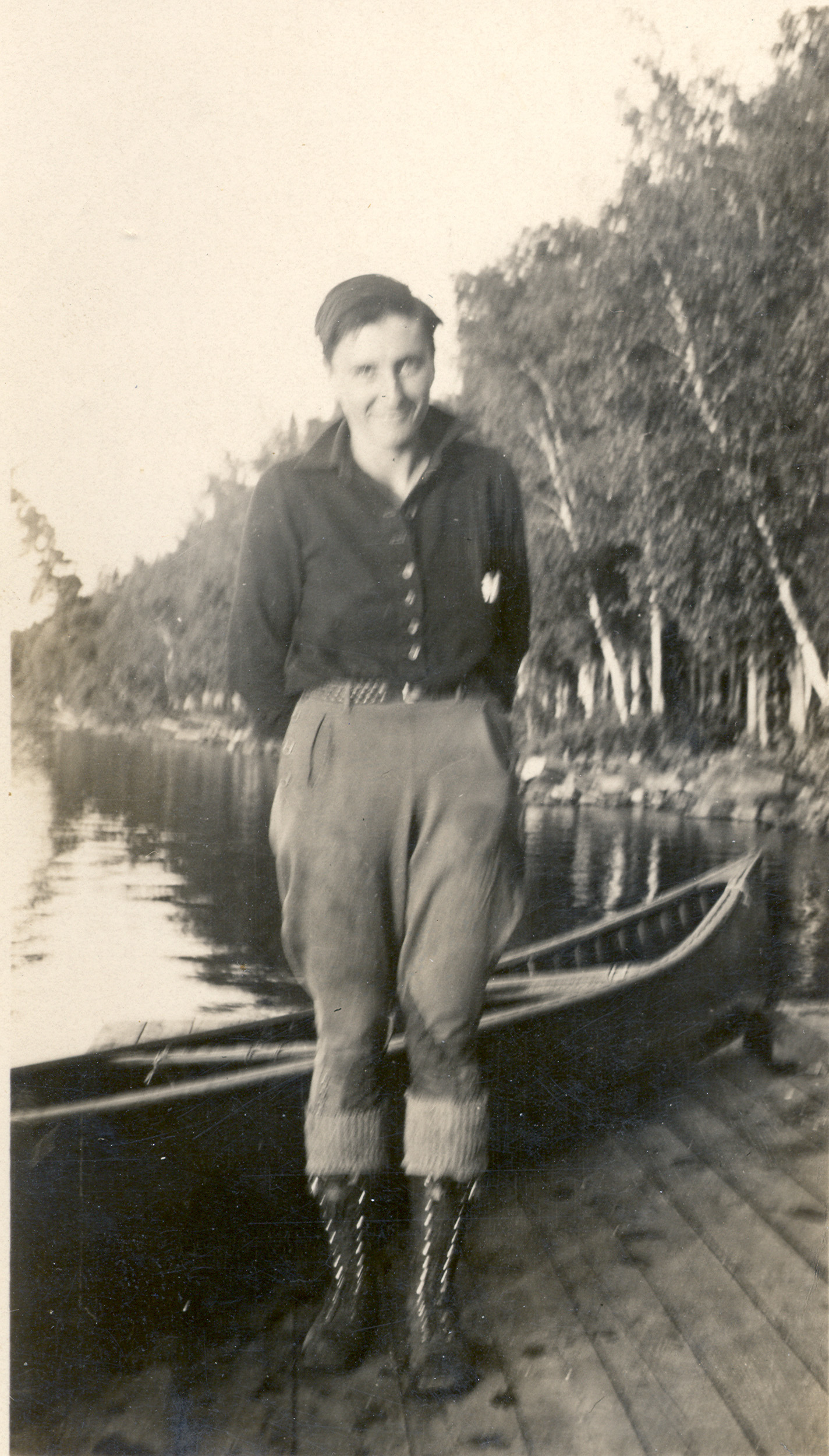
Justine Spunner (later Kerfoot) circa 1932

She was the sole author of two published books, co-authored a third, and created the foreword for a fourth. She also wrote a newspaper column for 42 years.

=== Woman of the Boundary Waters ===
- Woman of the Boundary Waters: Canoeing, Guiding, Mushing, and Surviving (Minnesota), paperback – April 15, 1994

This is a book about life in the area around the Gunflint Lodge starting in the late 1920s and her participation in it. This includes the lives of wilderness residents such as Chippewa families and trappers. The book also covers the development and operation of the lodge and her family's activities related to that.

=== Gunflint Reflections on the Trail ===
- Gunflint Reflections on the Trail

=== Other ===
- A Life in Two Worlds, 1996, co-authored
- The Gunflint Lodge Cookbook: Elegant Northwoods Dining, 1997, wrote the foreword and provided some recipes

She wrote a column, "On the Gunflint Trail", that ran weekly for 42 years in the Cook County News Herald.

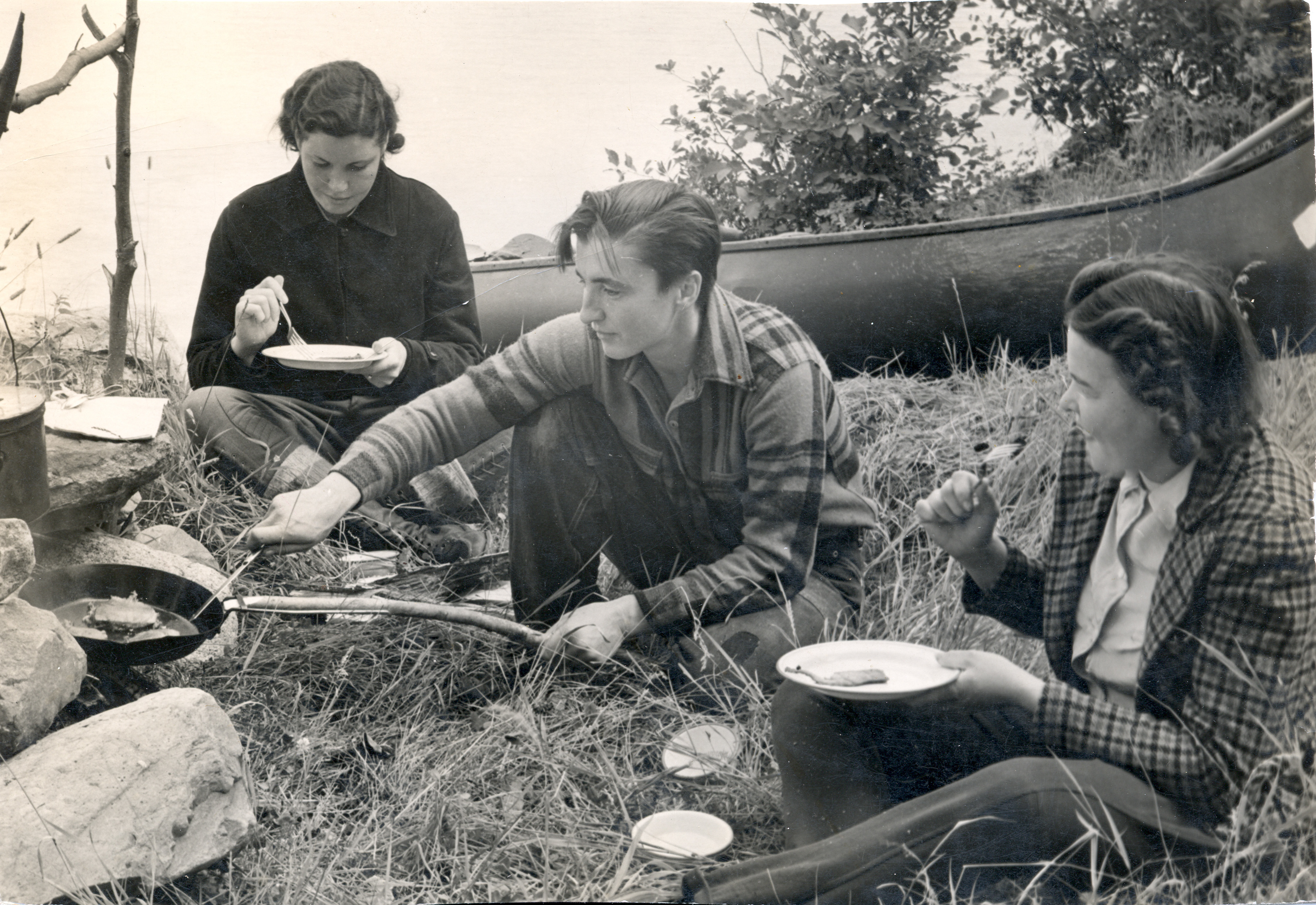
Justine Kerfoot circa 1945

== See also ==
- Gunflint Trail
- Boundary Waters Canoe Area Wilderness
- Quetico Provincial Park
- Boundary waters
