= Dorothy Molter =

American hermit

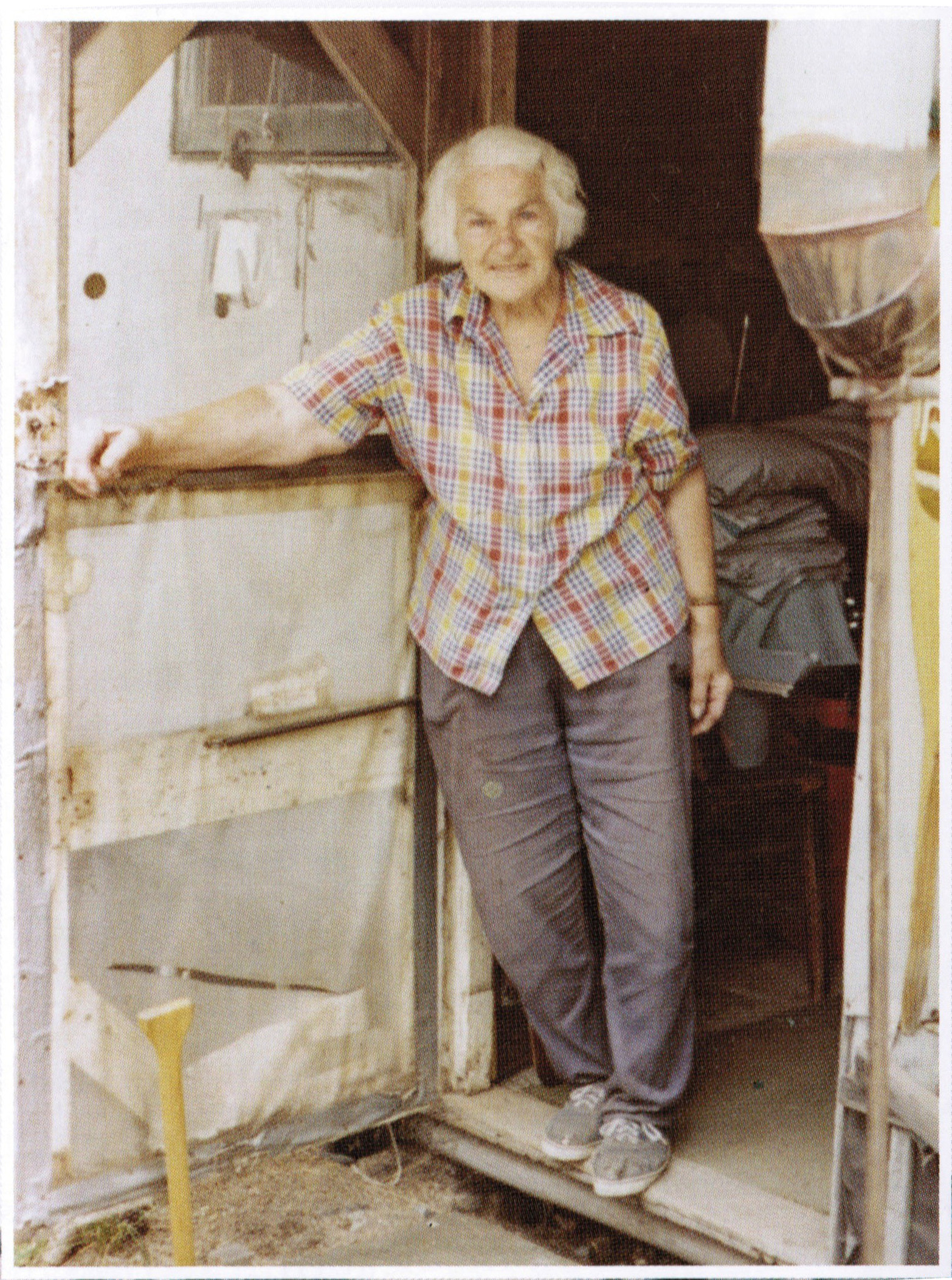
- Dorothy Molter welcoming guests
- Born: May 6, 1907; Arnold, Pennsylvania
- Died: December 18, 1986 (aged 79); Fall Lake Township, Lake County, Minnesota
- Occupations: Registered nurse; Resort owner
- Years active: 1934–1986
- Known for: The last resident of the Boundary Waters Canoe Area Wilderness

Dorothy Louise Molter (May 6, 1907, in Arnold, Pennsylvania – December 18, 1986), lived for 56 years on Knife Lake in the Boundary Waters area of northern Minnesota. She was known as "Knife Lake Dorothy" or as the "Root Beer Lady", as she made root beer and sold it to thousands of passing canoeists in the Boundary Waters Canoe Area Wilderness (BWCAW), near Ely, Minnesota. Various factors combined to give her national prominence, extensive coverage in media, books and documentaries, and tens of thousands of visits by Boundary Waters Canoe Area canoeists, often with 6,000–7,000 visitors per year.

She first visited her future home (The Isle of Pines Resort) on Knife Lake in 1930. It became her home starting in 1934. Molter's life, and her place in the public eye was significantly influenced by the evolution of the area where she lived into the Boundary Waters Canoe Area Wilderness. Changes related to this transition affecting her life occurred from 1948 through 1984. She died in 1986 at age 79. She was the last full time resident of the BWCAW.

== Life ==
=== 1907–1930 ===
Molter lived with her parents Mattie and John "Cap" Molter in Pennsylvania until her mother died when she was in second grade. She lived with her five brothers and sisters in a Cincinnati orphanage until 1919 when her father remarried and was able to provide a home for them in Garrett, Indiana. Later, they moved to Chicago. She graduated from Calumet High School. In 1927, she enrolled for nurse's training at Auburn Park Hospital.

=== 1930–1986 ===
In 1929 Molter's father Cap began fishing on Basswood lake. While fishing there he learned of The Isle of Pines Resort, a fishing resort on three islands further east on Knife Lake, and booked his first trip there (with his wife, brother and two friends) for the summer of 1930. Dorothy had just finished a semester of school, and when one of her father's friends had a change of plans, she was able to go in his place. During this visit she also helped out at the resort. She visited in each subsequent year and helped out more and more as time progressed. It became her home starting in 1934. The Isle of Pines resort consisted of rustic cabins located on the Isle of Pines island and an adjacent island on Knife Lake in Northern Minnesota, yards from the Canada–US border. It was owned and operated by Bill Berglund. Molter became the owner of the lodge in 1948 when Berglund died. She was a trained nurse and would often treat people for minor injuries. Molter would only leave occasionally to visit family in Chicago or to take additional education in Chicago to maintain her nursing license. After Berglund's death she lived there alone until her death in 1986.

==== Evolution of the BWCA ====
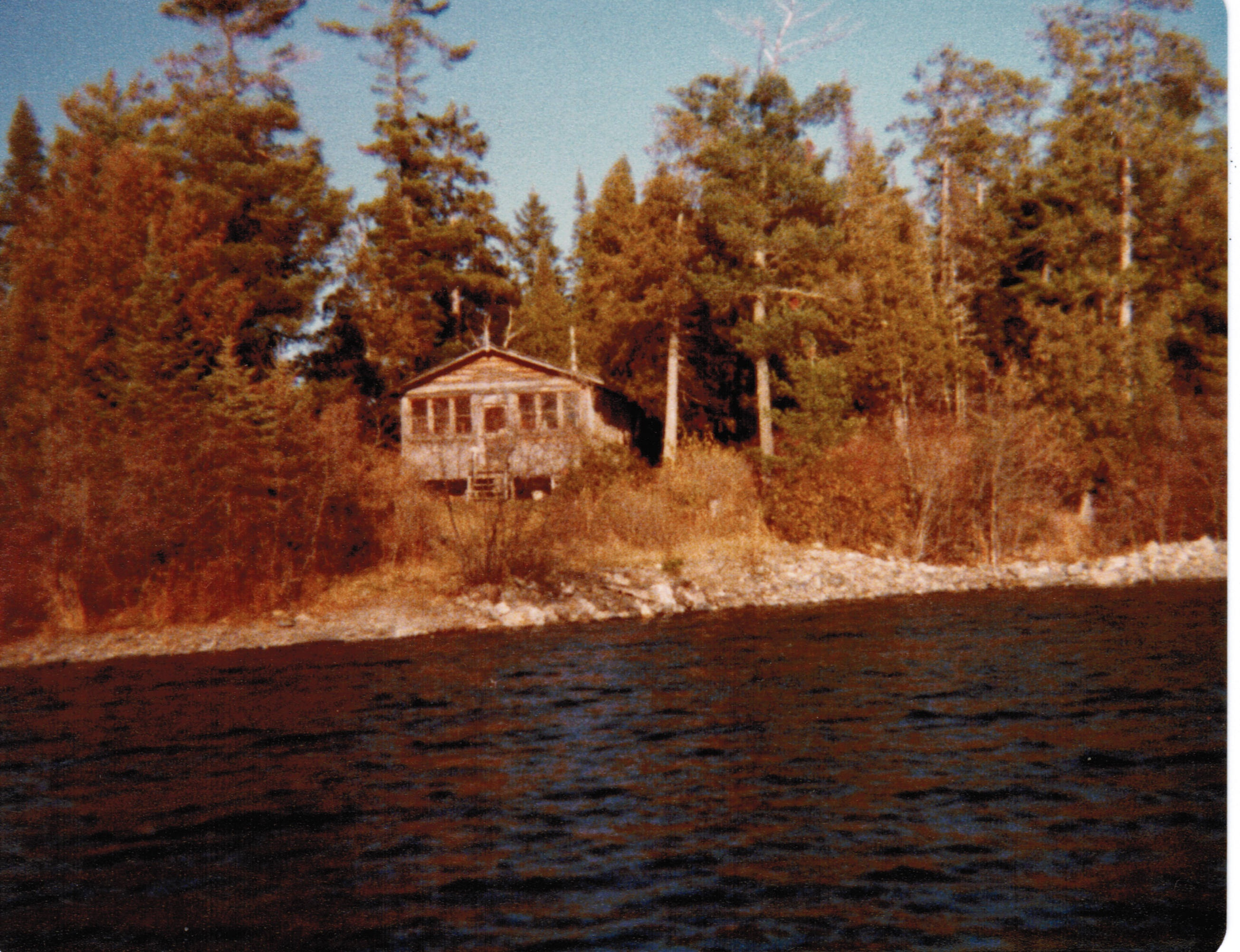
Molter's west cabin c.1978

Molter's life, and her place in the public eye, was significantly influenced by the evolution of the area into the Boundary Waters Canoe Area Wilderness. Up until the mid/late 1940s, the story of the Isle of Pines resort was typical of many north woods resorts. It was reachable by seaplanes and by motorboats, the latter when the boat was small enough and the gumption of the traveler high enough to carry the boat and motor over land at the portages. Later it was reached by snowmobiles as they came into use. Her location evolved into the BWCA. Ensuing changes between 1948 and 1984 had significant effects on her life. The BWCAW became the largest US wilderness east of the Mississippi (almost 1 million acres (4,000 km^{2}), 2 million acres if one includes the adjacent Quetico Provincial Park in Canada) and the most popular canoe area in the United States, with over 250,000 visits by canoeists per year. This change eliminated nearly all motorized transportation in this area, and removed other residences, buildings, business and (the few) roads from the wilderness, eventually leaving her as the only full-time resident in a canoe wilderness area three times the size of Rhode Island. At the same time that these transportation changes "moved" her even farther from civilization, they brought tens of thousands of canoeist visitors to her home. These factors contributed to the interest in and endearment of her, including print media and television coverage during the last 34 years of her life.

A few of the noteworthy changes to the BWCAW include:

- In 1948, the Thye-Blatnik Act provides $500,000 to buy out resorts and private lands in border lakes area; Also provides for in-lieu-of-tax payments to Cook, Lake, St. Louis counties for federal wilderness land; Forest Service (USFS) changes boundaries of roadless area and deletes much land near Lake Isabella (and Kawishiwi Lake) to accommodate logging needs and roads. This is the beginning of the USFS attempting to purchase the Isle of Pines; Bill Berglund dies and Dorothy Molter inherits the Isle of Pines Fishing Resort and property; Efforts to purchase Molter's Knife Lake property begin.
- In 1949, President Harry S. Truman issued an executive order banning flights below 4,000' over what is now the BWCAW thus, landing of float planes was prohibited.
- In 1952, two pilots still landing their float planes are caught and their planes confiscated effectively ending any flights in or out from Dorothy Molter's Isle of Pines.
- In 1958, the USFS changes name of Superior Roadless Area to Boundary Waters Canoe Area (this prevented the planning of a road that would connect Winton to Gunflint Lake near Grand Marais); People begin discussing the Wilderness Act
- In 1964 the U.S. Agriculture Secretary Orville Freeman appoints Selke Committee to recommend changes in BWCA management; the Wilderness Act is introduced in the Senate by Hubert H Humphrey; Congress passes the Wilderness Act and the BWCA becomes part of the National Wilderness Preservation System with a clause that allows some logging and use of motors to continue; In that same year condemnation proceedings taking away her ownership of the lodge were completed. Following public outcry, it was decided that she (and Benny Ambrose of Ottertrack Lake) could stay until 1975.
- In 1975 Molter and Ambrose were appointed as Forest Service "volunteers in service". This marked the beginning of a period during which the Forest Service began assisting Molter.
- In 1978 the BWCAW Act was passed, including a ban on snowmobiles and motorboats in her area effective 1984.
- In 1982 Benny Ambrose dies, leaving Molter as the last full-time, non-indigenous resident of the almost 2-million-acre (8,100 km^{2}) BWCA / Quetico wilderness.

==== Later years ====
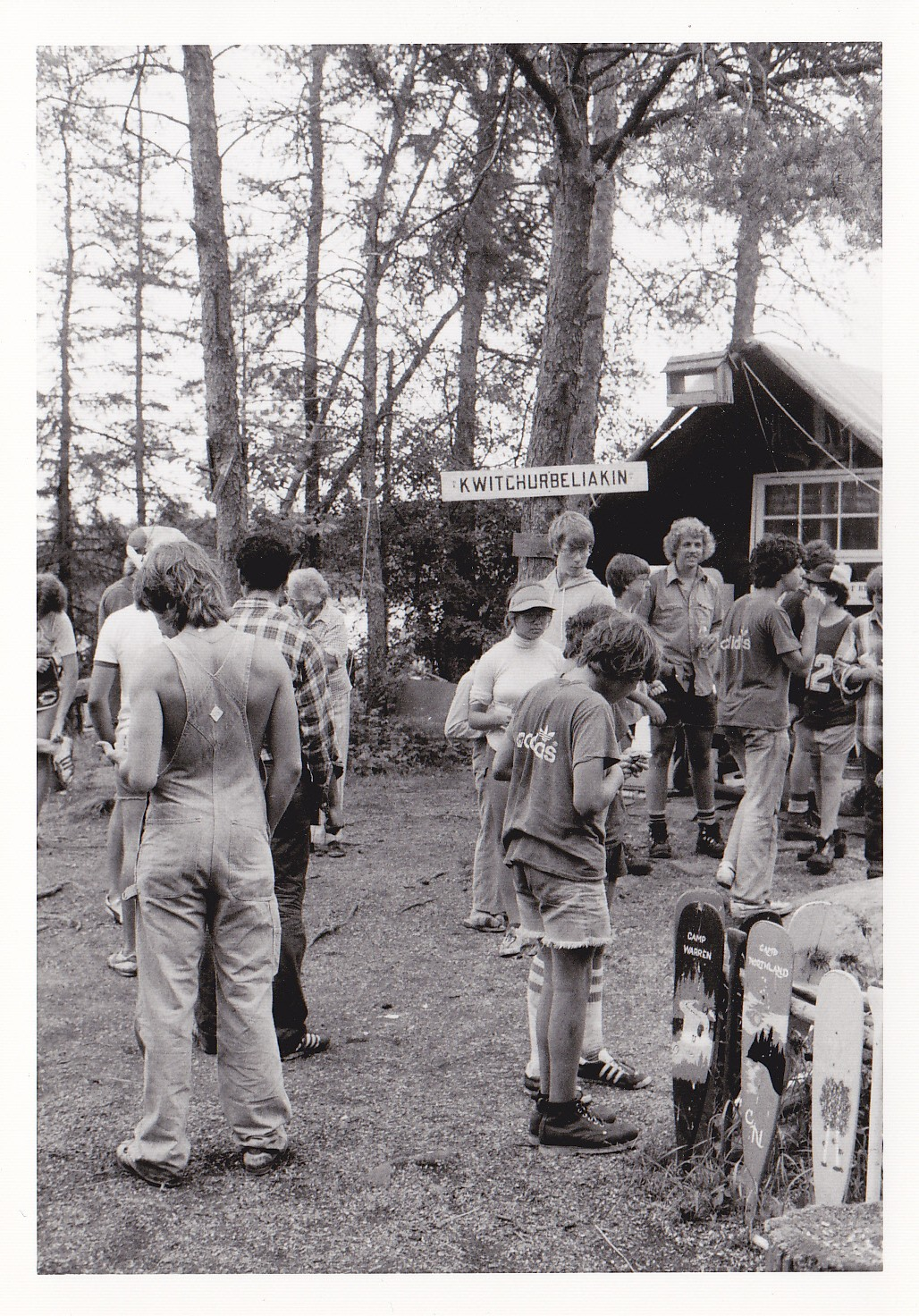
Campers visiting Dorothy Molter's home, photograph by James Keim

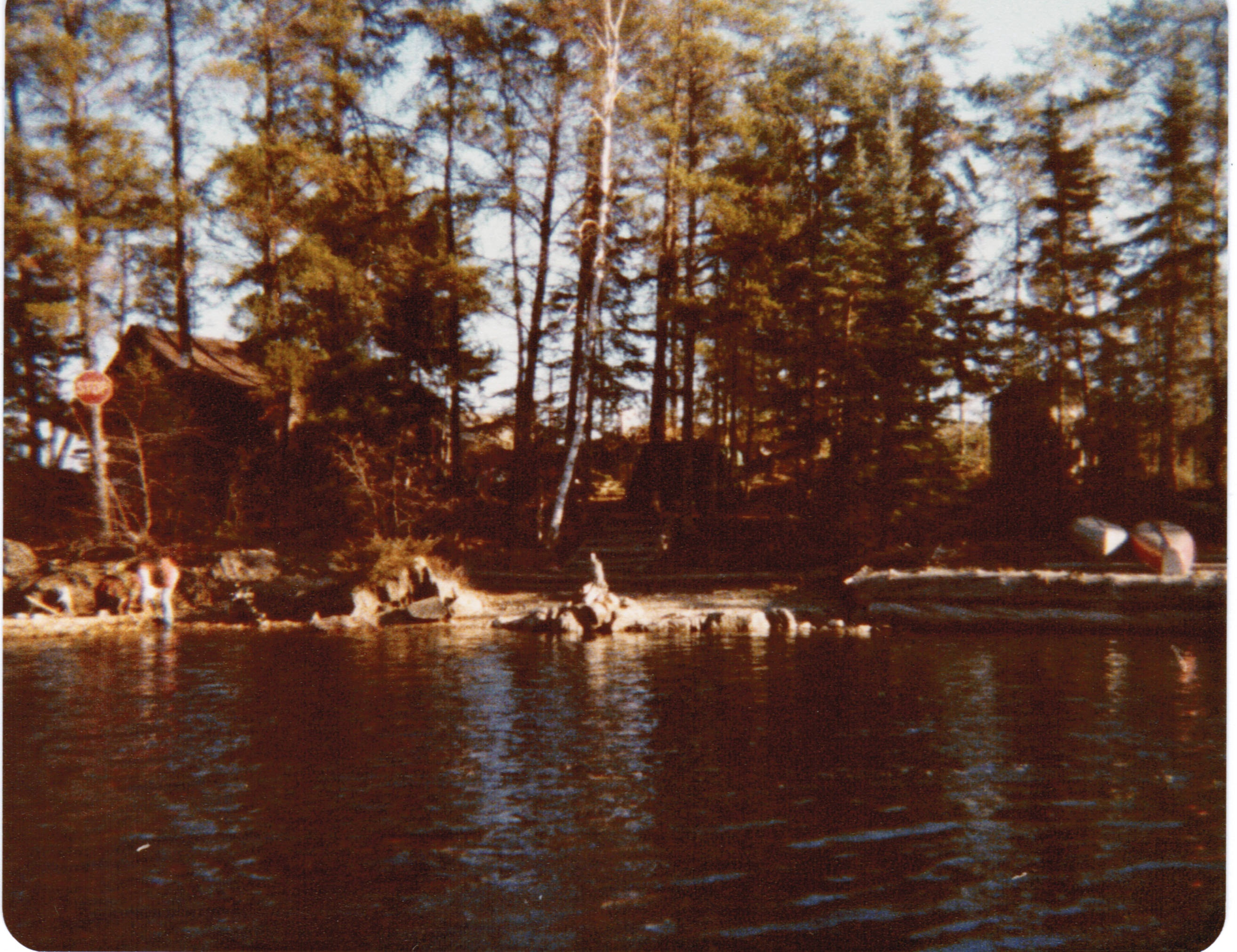
Molter's summer tent/cabin and pier c.1978

During the 1970s and 1980s, although her home no longer operated as a resort, visitation to Molter's islands reached upwards of 5,000-6,000 canoeists each year. Molter spent winters in cabins on the Isle of Pines and summers in a cabin-like multi-layered (canvas) tent on a smaller, satellite island a few dozen yards east of Isle of Pines. She had small, rustic footbridges between the islands, and a fence made of broken canoe paddles donated by visitors. She lived within yards of the US–Canada border.

She grew flowers in an area which is practically all rock and without soil. This required finding and hauling dirt and placing it into decommissioned fishing boats repurposed into planters and gathering wild seeds. Visitors were a "feast or famine" situation for Molter. During the warm months she would receive thousands of visits. Many signed her guest book which, would accumulate over 4,000 signatures in a summer. She began averaging between 6,000 and 7,000 guests per year, often over 100 in a day during the peak summer months of July and August. Winters saw far fewer visitors.

She had no electricity, telephone or utilities. She used portable tanks of bottled propane for cooking and a battery-powered 2-way radio. Her cabin was heated by wood, and the home-made root beer that she sold was cooled by thousands of pounds of ice which were hand cut from the lake in the winter and stored in her old-fashioned (non refrigerated) ice house. Each year the ice lasted at least through August. Although she was technically prohibited from selling root beer after the 1964 Wilderness Act, visitors continued to enjoy her root beer and made "donations".

With the passage of legislation extending the wilderness protections of the BWCAW, she was told she would have to leave. Due to an outpouring of support (including efforts by Senator and future Vice President Walter Mondale), a special exception was made allowing her to stay until 1975. In 1975 Molter and Ambrose were appointed as Forest Service "volunteers in service" and she was allowed to stay. This marked a period during which the Forest Service began assisting Molter. Benny Ambrose died in 1982, leaving Molter as the last full-time resident of the Boundary Waters wilderness. She lived there until she died in 1986.

One early article on her was the October 1952 Saturday Evening Post Article, "The Loneliest Woman in America" by Andrew Hamilton. While the title was not literally true, the term caught on. As Molter once observed, "If I had been the loneliest woman in America, by the time all of those writers and TV people came up here, I sure as heck wouldn't have been" Through a combination of her remote location and BWCAW wilderness restrictions against motors and motorized travel, Molter's home was amongst the most isolated in the country. The nearest road required 15 miles of travel by water and five portages over land to reach. It typically took approximately 1 1/2 days of travel from her home to reach the nearest road, and her home was approximately 36 miles (58 km) from the nearest (small) town.

She died December 18, 1986, at age 79. She was survived by her brother, John A. Molter and sister Hazel Hoffman, both of Chicago, her niece, Sally Margis of Midlothian, IL and many other relatives. It was said that the people of Ely, the closest town, were very saddened by her death, but happy that she died in the way that she wanted to.

== Media, book and documentary coverage ==
From 1952 until her death in 1986, Molter was the subject of ongoing media and documentary coverage. Her life was the subject of a book entitled The Root Beer Lady by Bob Cary of Ely, which is a collection of short stories based on the author's friendship with Dorothy, and in 2011, a biography entitled Dorothy Molter: The Root Beer Lady of Knife Lake by Sarah Guy-Levar (executive director of the Dorothy Molter Museum 2007-2017) and Terry Schocke (former staff at the Dorothy Molter Museum) was published. She was also the subject of National Geographic publications, a broadcast of the "Real People" television series, and of a documentary video "Dorothy Molter - Living in the Boundary Waters." Charles Kuralt visited her and featured her on his television program, and also wrote about her in his book Charles Kuralt's America.

== Cabins and museum ==
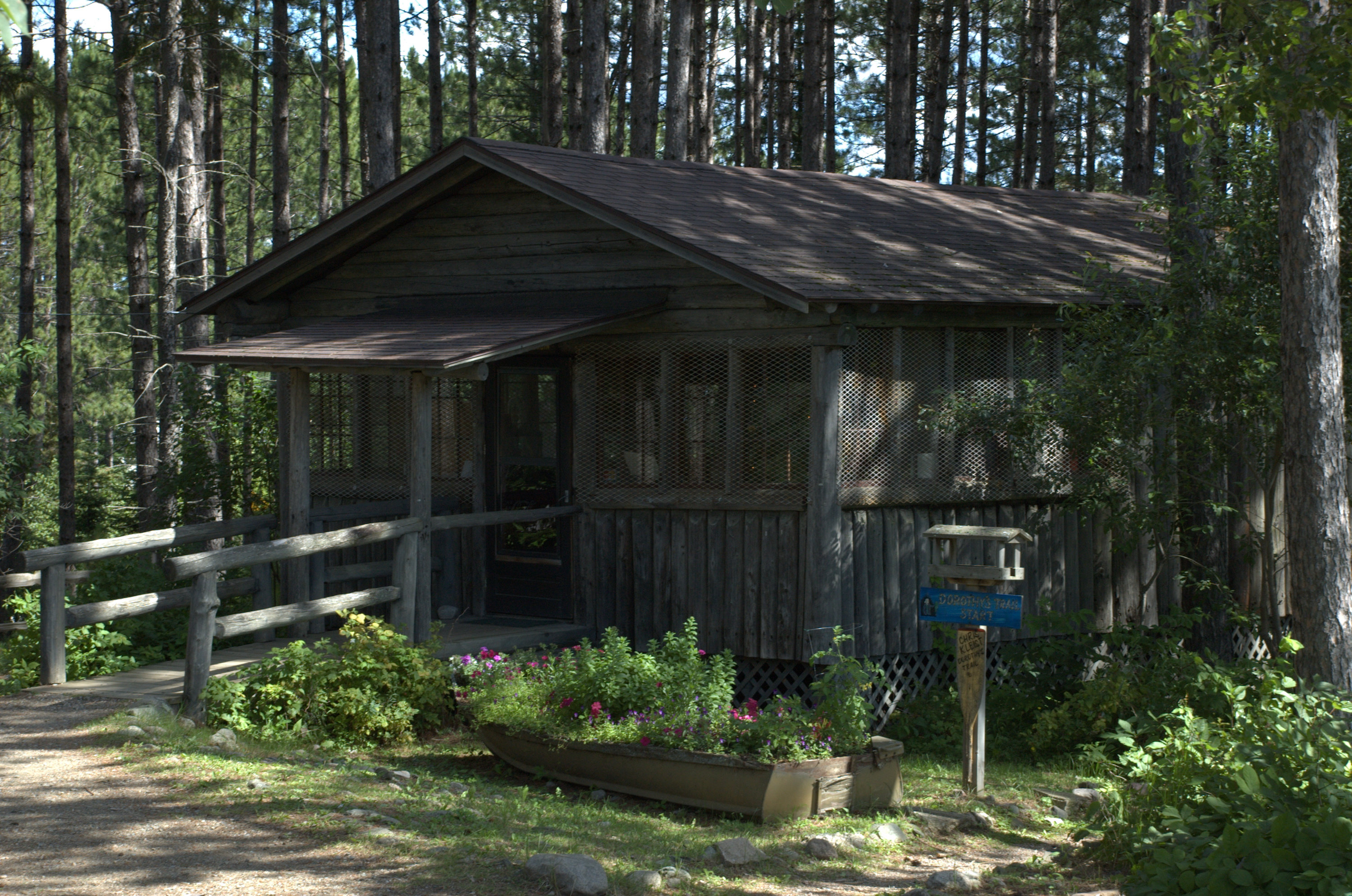
The Dorothy Molter cabin in Ely

After Molter's death, her cabins were dismantled and moved to Ely. The effort involved transporting the disassembled cabins by dog sled to a point at the Boy Scouts' Northern Tier Charles L. Sommers Canoe Base on Moose Lake. Time was of the essence as the Forest Service was directed to burn her cabins down by a certain date. An unseasonably warm March stymied those efforts to move her cabins by dogsled and special permission was obtained to use motorized transportation such as snowmobiles. Her residence was re-erected on the east side of Ely, Minnesota on a site near the Chamber of Commerce building.

=== Dorothy Molter Museum ===
The Dorothy Molter Museum was formed to preserve her legacy. The cabin was moved from the chamber of commerce site to the museum, and a second cabin of hers was also erected and restored at the museum. The museum is located on the south side of Route 169 (Sheridan St) at the east end of Ely, Minnesota.
