= Greenwood Lake (Lake County, Minnesota) =

Lake in the state of Minnesota, United States

- Location within Minnesota
- Location: Lake County, Minnesota
- Coordinates: 47°31′N 91°38′W
- Type: lake

Greenwood Lake is a lake in Lake County, in the U.S. state of Minnesota.

Greenwood Lake was named for George C. Greenwood, a pioneer merchant. In 2021, the Greenwood Fire began near the lake and was named after it.

== See also ==
- List of lakes in Minnesota
