= Greenwood Fire =

2021 wildfire in northern Minnesota

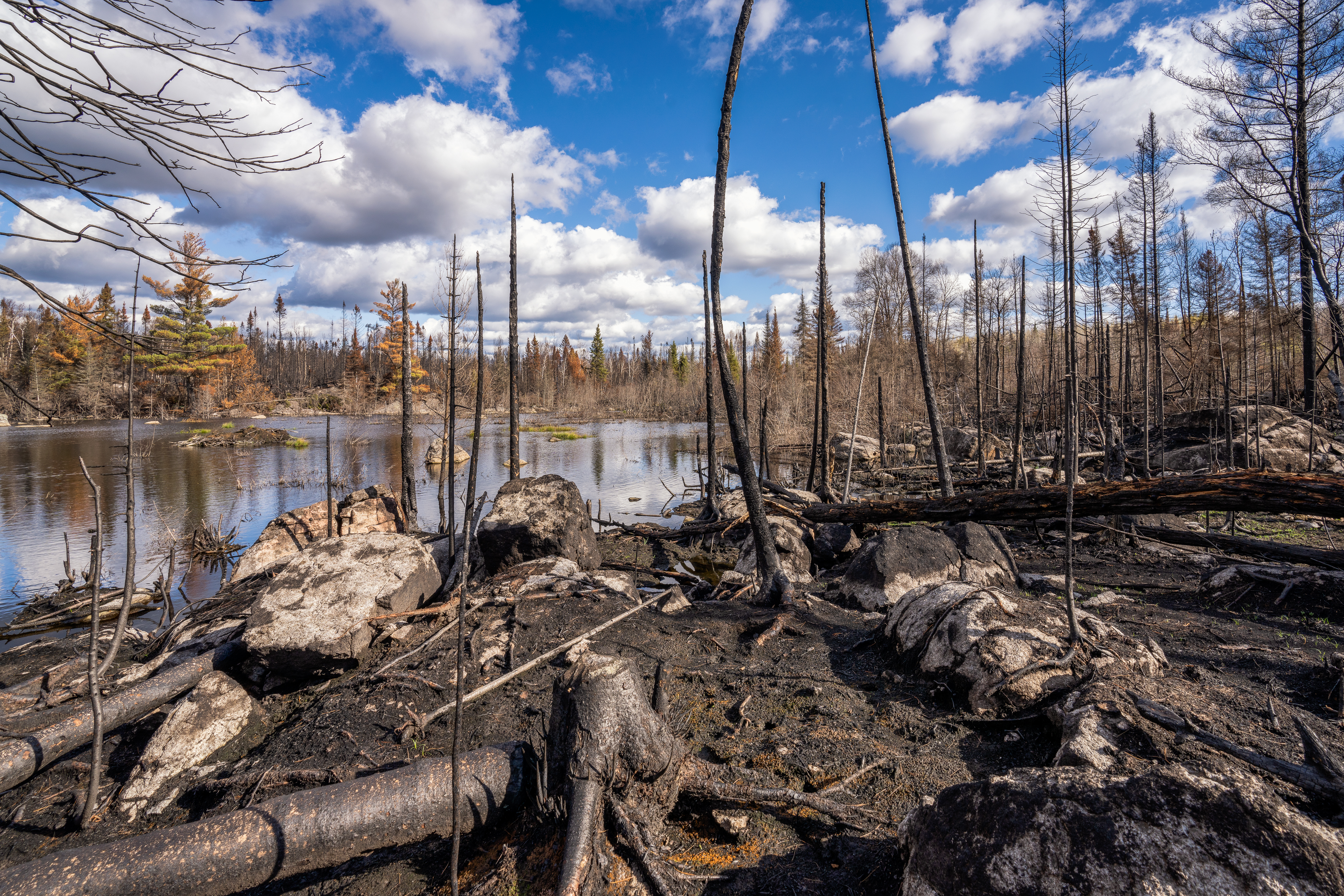
- A forested area burned by the fire
- Date: August 15, 2021 – October 1, 2021
- Location: SW of Isabella, Minnesota
- Coordinates: 47.553°N 91.648°W

Statistics
- Burned area: 26,797 acres 42 square miles108 square kilometres10,844 hectares

Impacts
- Deaths: 0
- Injuries: 0
- Structures lost: 14

Ignition
- Cause: Lightning

Map
- Location in Northern Minnesota

US Forest Service map of the Greenwood Fire as of August 28, 2021

The Greenwood Fire was a wildfire in the Arrowhead Region of Minnesota in the United States. First noted near Greenwood Lake in Lake County on August 15, 2021, it is believed to have been sparked by lightning. The fire burned 26,797 acres, largely within the Superior National Forest, destroying 14 buildings and damaging 3 more. By early October, the fire was considered largely spent, although parts continued to smolder.

The fire prompted the evacuation of more than 290 homes and resulted in the temporary closure of the entire nearby Boundary Waters Canoe Area Wilderness for the first time since the 1970s. The closure began August 20 for a period of one week and was extended another week to end September 3. All area and road closures were lifted by early October.

More than 400 firefighters were called to help contain the fire, which was at 49% containment as of September 7. By September 20th, the fire was at 80% containment and considered well-managed; evacuees began to return to their properties. In early October, firefighting duties returned to Forest Service management and the number of firefighters assigned dipped below 100.

The fire was believed to have been worsened by the 2020-21 North American drought. On August 18, 2021, the Department of Natural Resources announced that three watersheds of northern Minnesota had experienced "exceptional drought intensity." That classification had not been used since the scale was created in 2000. DNR added that "the current drought is not as severe as the historic droughts of 1988-89 or the 1930s."

== See also ==
- 2011 Pagami Creek Fire
