= Sioux–Hustler Trail =

Northeastern Minnesota Hiking Trail

Coordinates: 48.2291°N 92.1601°W

The Sioux–Hustler Trail is a 35-mile (56 km) hiking trail in the Boundary Waters Canoe Area in northeastern Minnesota. The trail is approximately an hour's drive from Ely, Minnesota, along the Echo Trail. The trail, which is primitive and not well maintained, runs from the Little Indian Sioux River through relatively untouched country to Hustler Lake, which is at an altitude of 1,302 ft (397 m).

== Trail Information ==
Distance:	35 miles round trip
Surface:	Native material with uneven tread and exposed roots and rocks
Width:	18" tread, 64" clearance
Terrain:	Varied, with hills, exposed ledge rock, wetland areas, a beaver pond, and stream crossings
Remarks:	Be prepared with maps, compass, food, water and shelter. Let someone know your plans. This trail is minimally maintained. A permit is required to enter the BWCA Wilderness. Leave No Trace.

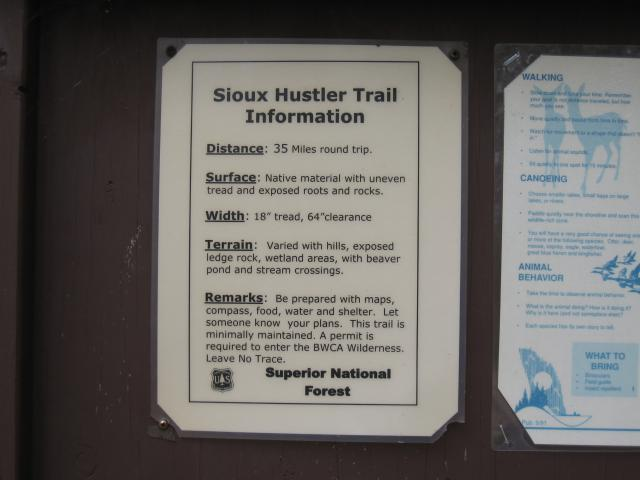
Trail Sign

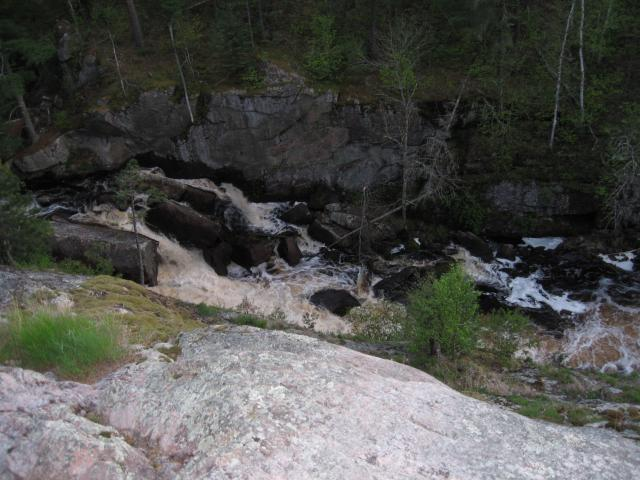
Devil's Cascade

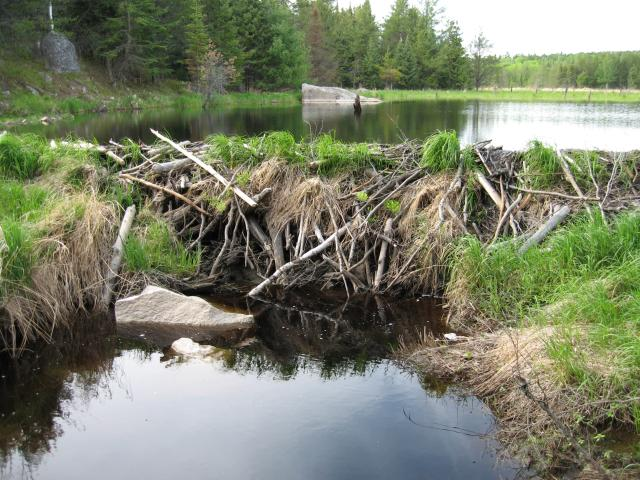
Beaver Dam

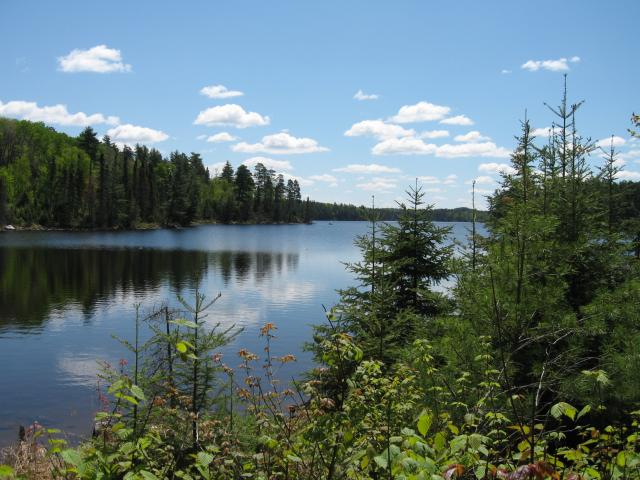
Shell Lake

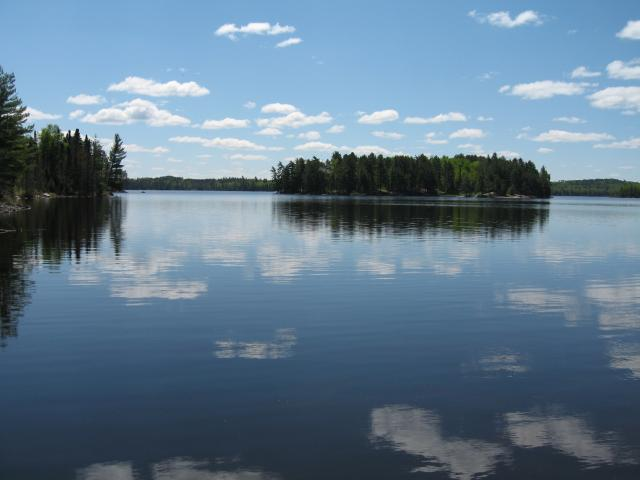
Shell Lake 2

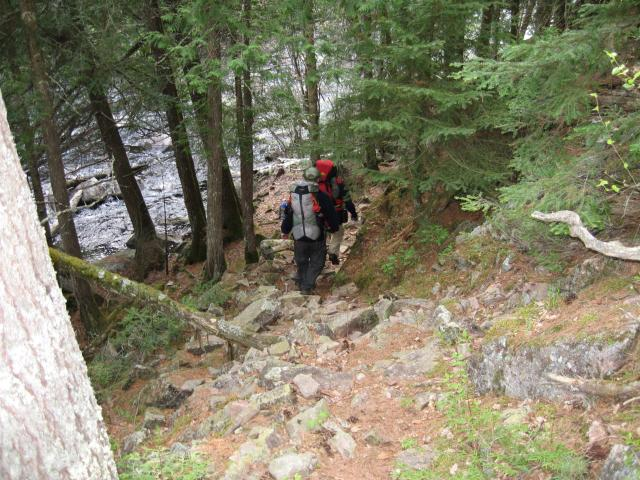
Little Indian Sioux River

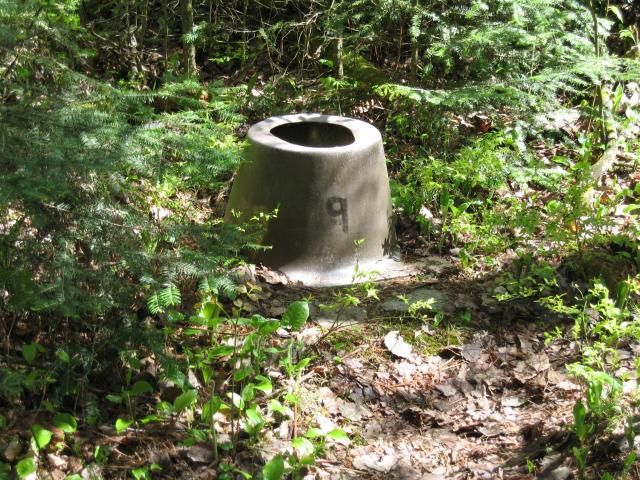
Toilet

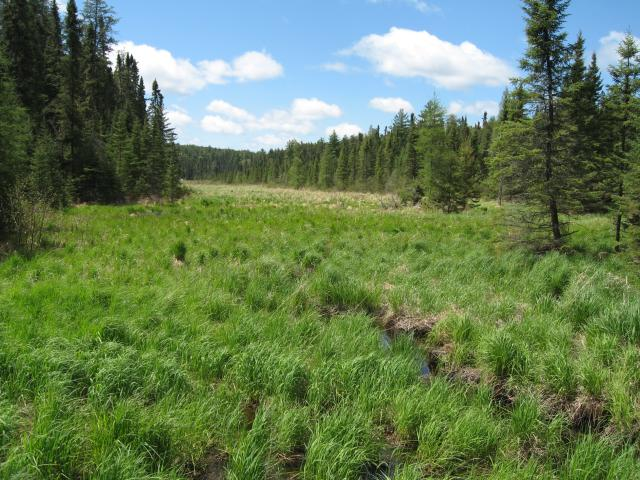
Bog
