= Pagami Creek Fire =

2011 wildfire in northern Minnesota

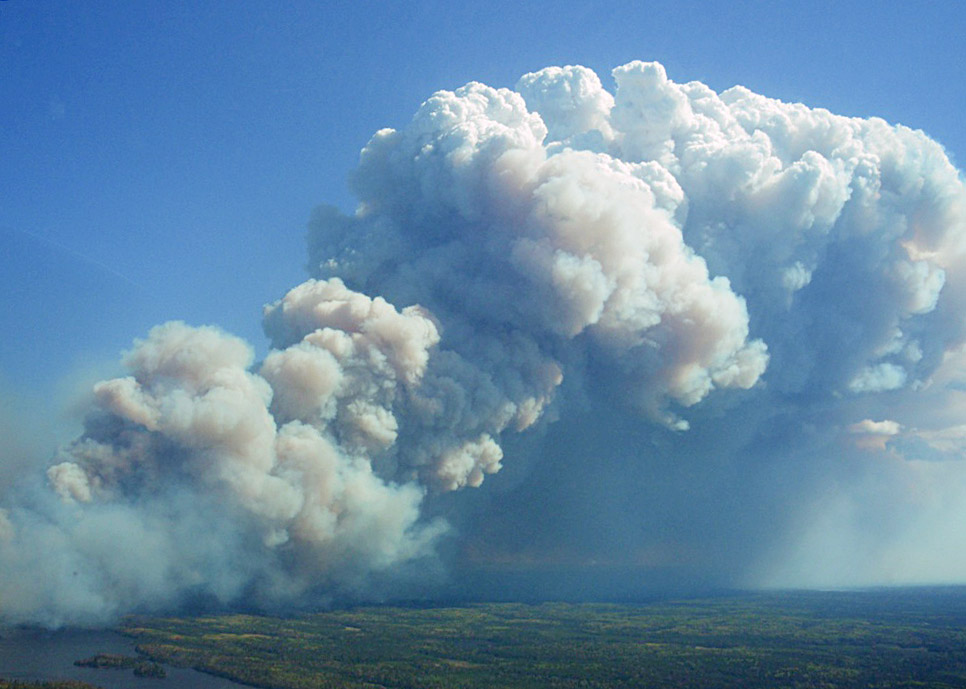
- Smoke rises from the fire.
- Date: August 18, 2011 – November 2011
- Location: Northern Minnesota
- Coordinates: 47.855°N 91.334722°W

Statistics
- Burned area: 92,682 acres (375 km^{2})

Ignition
- Cause: Lightning

Map
- Location of fire in Minnesota

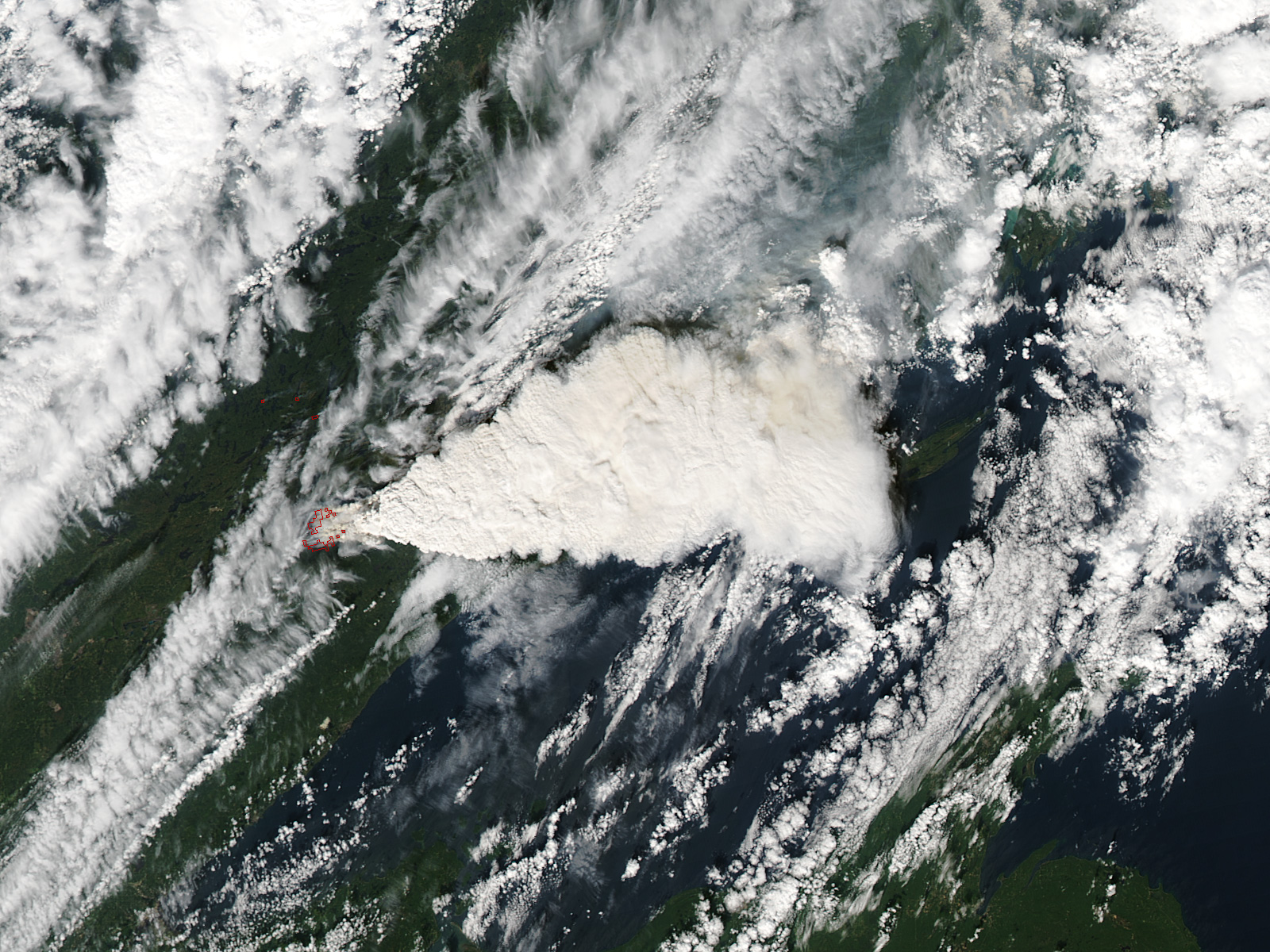
Pagami Creek smoke plume

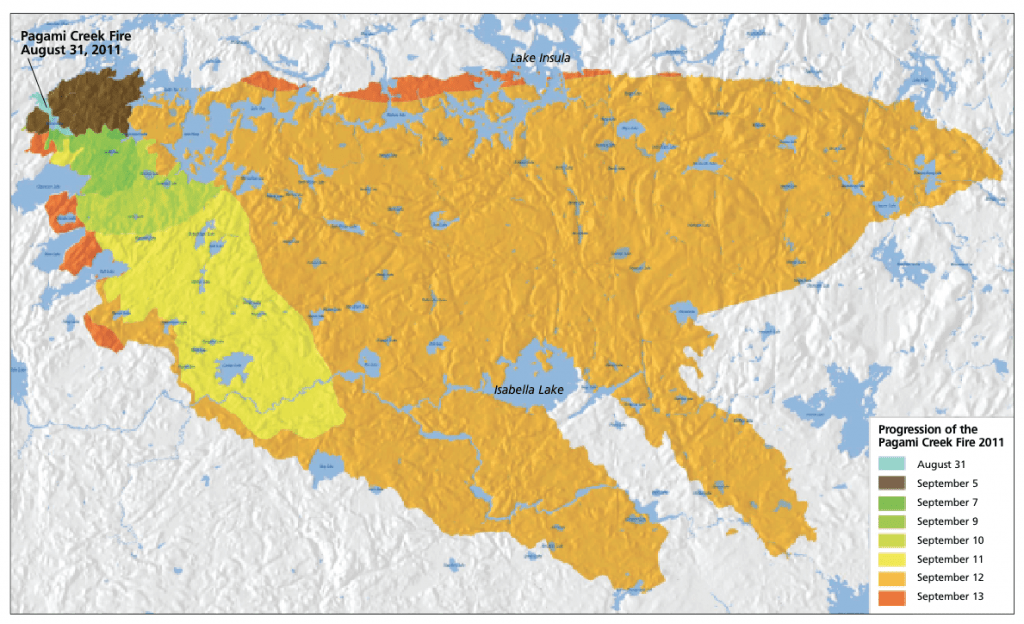
Map showing the progression of the fire

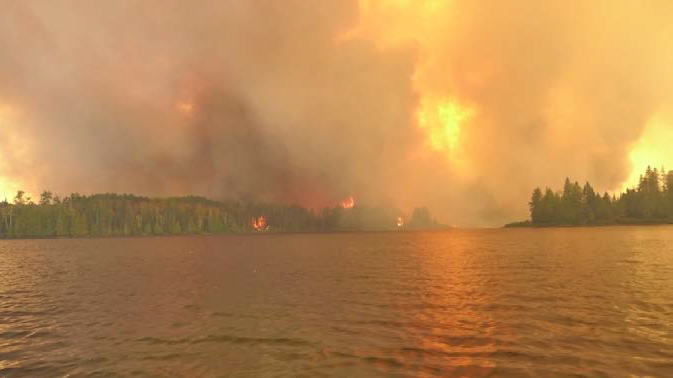
Fire approaching the south shore of Lake 3, September 10, 2011

The Pagami Creek Fire was a wildfire in northern Minnesota, United States, that began with a lightning strike on August 18, 2011. After weeks of slow growth, the wildfire quickly spread to over 92,000 acres (370 km^{2}) during several days of hot, dry, windy weather in mid-September. The fire spread beyond the Boundary Waters Canoe Area Wilderness to threaten homes and businesses. Smoke from the fires drifted east and south as far as the Upper Peninsula of Michigan, Ontario, and Chicago The fire was the largest naturally occurring wildfire in Minnesota in more than a century.

In November 2016, an educational mini documentary was released by the US Department of Agriculture and US Forest Service, Technology and Development Program about the fire and public safety officers who survived it.

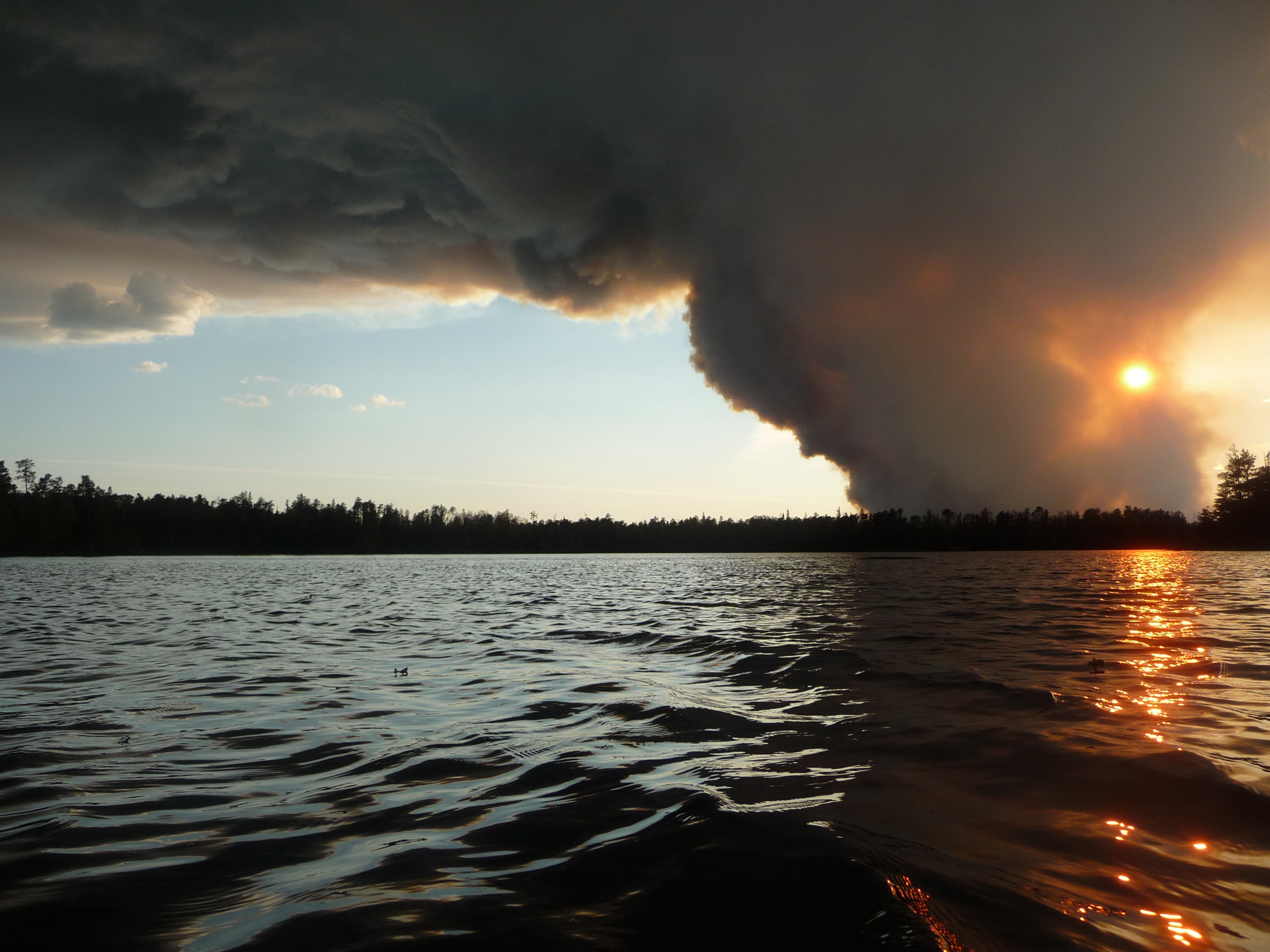
Pagami Creek Fire as seen from the south end of Lake Insula on Saturday, Sept. 10, 2011

== See also ==
- 2021 Greenwood Lake Fire
