= Miron Lee Heinselman =

Ecologist and Wilderness Advocate

Miron Lee "Bud" Heinselman
- Born: February 2, 1920; Duluth, Minnesota
- Died: February 28, 1993 (aged 73); Minneapolis, Minnesota
- Education: University of Minnesota
- Occupations: Ecologist, Conservationist
- Years active: 1948-1993
- Employer: USDA Forest Service
- Organizations: University of Minnesota (Adjunct Professor, Department of Ecology and Behavioral Biology); Friends of the Boundary Waters Wilderness
- Known for: Peatlands Ecology Fire Ecology Wilderness Conservation
- Spouse: Frances Ruth Brown (m.1942)
- Honours: National Academy of Science, Cottrell Award for Research Contributions in Environmental Quality; American Motors Conservation Award; Sol Feinstone Environmental Award; Izaak Walton League of America, 54 Founders Award

Miron Lee "Bud" Heinselman (February 7, 1920 – February 28, 1993) was an American ecologist and conservationist whose research and writing focused on two major ecological fields. The first area concerned the ecology of boreal peatlands, and the second centered on fire ecology and the role of fire in northern conifer forests.

Heinselman also was a dedicated wildlands conservationist. He explored the area of northern Minnesota now known as the Boundary Waters Canoe Area Wilderness (BWCAW) and advocated for its protection as a federal wilderness for many decades beginning in the 1950s. From 1976-1978, he helped form the Friends of the Boundary Waters Wilderness, led a national citizens campaign to protect the BWCAW, and passed the 1978 BWCAW Act through Congress, bringing new statutory protections to the area.

== Early life ==
Miron Heinselman was born in Duluth, Minnesota, the son of Everett Millard Heinselman (1895-1979) and Helena Alvina (Krueger) Heinselman (1895-1969). On September 18, 1942, Heinselman married Frances Ruth Brown in Minneapolis. They had two children, Russell Craig Heinselman (born 1946) and Ann Louise Heinselman (born 1947).

Heinselman graduated from high school in Minneapolis, and attended the University of Minnesota. He received a Bachelor of Arts degree there in 1942. After serving two years in the U.S. Army during World War II, he returned to the University of Minnesota to obtain a Bachelor of Science in Forestry in 1948 and a Master’s degree in Forestry in 1951. In 1961 he received his Ph. D. degree from the University of Minnesota.

== Research career ==
In 1948, Heinselman began his career as a research scientist in forest ecology with the USDA Forest Service’s North Central Forest Experiment Station (earlier called the Lake States Forest Experiment Station) in Minnesota. He became an expert in peatland ecology, working in the huge Lake Agassiz peatlands of northern Minnesota, the largest boreal peatlands in the lower 48 states and also the subject of his doctoral dissertation. Among other things, Heinselman discovered that patterned fens and bogs developed their unique linear features (strings and flarks) from slight hydrologic gradients and varied chemistry and nutrient flows. He identified eight different peatland types, and five phases of peatland landscape evolution. He determined that the paludification of peatlands he researched (rising water table along with rising peat accumulation) conflicted with the earlier concepts of peatland succession that predicted a lakefill outcome.

While conducting research and coring peatlands, Heinselman noticed layers of charcoal in the peat cores. This led to his interest in the role of fire in northern forests. Heinselman began researching the role of fire in northern conifer forests and became an internationally recognized expert in fire ecology. From 1966 to 1974, he identified and mapped the remaining primary or unlogged forests (then often termed “virgin” forests) of the million-acre Boundary Waters Canoe Area (BWCA) in northeastern Minnesota’s Superior National Forest, as well as reconstructed its history of logging. He visited the BWCA in all seasons, including winter, and would use an increment borer (or a section sawed from tree trunks) to count tree growth rings and thus determine the age of the stands in which they grew. As part of this research, he reconstructed the fire history of the BWCA going back to the year 1595. Heinselman discovered that roughly half (540,000 acres) of the million-acre BWCA had never been logged, making it a unique ecological laboratory as well as a prized recreational resource. He developed detailed stand-origin maps of all of the unlogged forests of the BWCA, showing the forest mosaic based on its fire history.

Heinselman’s research also led to a new understanding of the ecological role of fire in boreal ecosystems, how fire periodically renews the northern forest, and how historic fire suppression in these forests had significantly altered the natural disturbance patterns. He developed the concept of a natural fire regime for the BWCA and determined how frequently stand-replacement fires burned in the BWCA prior to the era of fire suppression.

Heinselman’s scientific publications include five major articles that demonstrate the breadth of his expertise: two significant articles on peatland ecology in Ecological Monographs, his landmark 1973 article in Quaternary Research on fire in the virgin forests of the BWCA, and his lengthy 1981 chapters in two different books (one a description of fire and northern ecosystems across the continent and the other delving deeply into the ecological concept of succession and the role of fire in succession).

In assessing Heinselman’s career as an ecologist, Dr. John Pastor (University of Minnesota) wrote, “Bud’s papers are classics in the field of ecology. Ecologists know him best through his 1973 paper in Quaternary Research on fire in the Boundary Waters, his 1963 and 1970 papers in Ecological Monographs on the peatlands of Glacial Lake Agassiz, and his 1978 summary paper on fire in North American forests in the Forest Service monograph on Fire Regimes and Ecosystem Properties. Any ecologist would consider his or her career a success if they simply wrote one paper of the caliber of these. To have written four is an outstanding achievement, and to have helped define such different fields of ecology as he did is almost unheard of this century.”

== Conservation career ==
Heinselman began a new career as a voluntary conservationist and wilderness advocate in the mid-1970s. He had become active on wilderness issues in the 1950s working with the Izaak Walton League of America, a private nonprofit conservation organization. He upset his own agency and some in the professional forestry community in 1964 by calling for full wilderness status for the BWCA and an end to policies of the U.S. Forest Service that promoted logging there. Heinselman even challenged the widely respected Dean of the School of Forestry at the University of Minnesota, Frank Kaufert, who had served on Heinselman’s doctoral committee; Kaufert fully supported logging the Boundary Waters. The two debated at a September 1964 closed-door session of the Selke Committee, a BWCA review panel appointed by the U.S. Secretary of Agriculture, Orville Freeman. Thereafter the Forest Service required that Heinselman not take a public role on BWCA issues even on his own time. The Selke Committee did recommend that the Forest Service begin research on the BWCA’s wilderness ecology, the forestry component of which Heinselman was selected to lead in 1966. Still, the U.S. Forest Service continued to push cutting of the unlogged primary forest throughout the second half of the 1960s and into the 1970s, the same forest that Heinselman was trying to study.

Heinselman took an early retirement from the Forest Service in 1974 in order to become more fully and publicly involved in conservation efforts to save the BWCA as a wilderness. He became active in early efforts to fight sulfide-metal mining in the canoe country, working with the Copper-Nickel Coalition of the mid-1970s, right after his retirement. In May 1976, he and other environmentalists formed the Friends of the Boundary Waters Wilderness to push for new federal legislation to protect the BWCA from logging, mining, motorized travel, and other development. Heinselman was elected as the Chair of this new coalition, in what soon became a full-time unpaid volunteer position. Over the next two and a half years Heinselman led the Friends’ citizen effort to pass new legislation through Congress to protect the BWCA. As part of this national campaign, both Heinselman and his wife Fran lived in Washington, DC for months at a time, coordinating the Friends efforts in a highly politically-charged campaign. Without Heinselman’s scientific expertise, tenacity, and selflessness, few would likely have succeeded in this role.

Heinselman’s wilderness work was not without controversy, and he and his friend Sigurd F. Olson were hung in effigy outside the Ely, Minnesota auditorium where Congressional field hearings were held in July 1977. Heinselman worked particularly closely with Congressmen Donald M. Fraser (D-MN), Bruce F. Vento (D-MN), and Phillip Burton (D-CA). Heinselman’s efforts largely succeeded in October 1978 when Congress passed the Boundary Waters Canoe Area Wilderness Act. President Jimmy Carter signed the bill into law on October 21, 1978 as Public Law 95-495 (92 Stat. 1649).

The new law ended logging in the BWCAW, tightly restricted mining, phased out nearly all snowmobile use, reduced motorboat use from 62% of the water surface area to about 21%, and added some 68,000 acres to the BWCAW in over 20 additions carefully mapped by Heinselman himself. The new law removed a special provision in the original 1964 Wilderness Act that had specifically allowed logging and motorized travel in the BWCAW, the only time that the landmark 1964 law has been directly amended.

Heinselman remained active on conservation issues related to the BWCAW for the rest of his life, including understanding and blunting the effects of acid rain, implementing and defending the 1978 law from challenges in federal courts, working to oppose military jet overflights above the BWCAW, establishing the International Wolf Center in Ely, Minnesota, purchasing private developable lands at the edge of the BWCAW, and much more.

Heinselman authored or co-authored two books, both published posthumously, that reflect both his conservation advocacy and research careers: Troubled Waters: The Fight for the Boundary Waters Canoe Area Wilderness in 1995, and The Boundary Waters Wilderness Ecosystem in 1996.

Heinselman died in Minneapolis, Minnesota, on February 28, 1993, at age 73 from the effects of a rare blood disorder.

== Selected works ==
- 1961 Heinselman, M. L. Black spruce on the peatlands of former glacial Lake Agassiz and adjacent areas in Minnesota: a study of forest sites, bog processes and bog types. Ph. D. dissertation, Univ. of Minn., 331 pp.
- 1963 Heinselman, M. L. Forest sites, bog processes, and peatland types in the Glacial Lake Agassiz Region, Minnesota. Ecological Monographs 33: 327-374. https://esajournals.onlinelibrary.wiley.com/doi/10.2307/1950750
- 1965 Heinselman, M. L. Vegetation management in Wilderness Areas and primitive parks. Journal of Forestry. 63: 440-445. https://www.frames.gov/catalog/28988.
- 1969 Heinselman, M. L. Diary of the Canoe Country’s Landscape. Naturalist 20 (1): 2-13.
- 1970 Heinselman, M. L. Landscape evolution, peatland types, and the environment in the Lake Agassiz Peatlands Natural Area, Minnesota. Ecological Monographs 40: 235-261. https://esajournals.onlinelibrary.wiley.com/doi/abs/10.2307/1942297
- 1971 Heinselman, M. L. The natural role of fire in northern conifer forests. In Proceedings, Intermountain Fire Research Council, Symposium on “The role of fire in the Intermountain West.” Missoula, Montana, October 27–29, 1970, pp. 30–41. https://www.frames.gov/catalog/2481.
- 1971 Heinselman, M. L. Restoring fire to the ecosystems of the Boundary Waters Canoe Area, Minnesota. In Proc., Annual Tall Timbers Fire Ecology Conference, Fredericton, New Brunswick, Aug. 20-21, 1970, pp. 9–23. http://talltimbers.org/wp-content/uploads/2014/03/Heinselman1970_op.pdf.
- 1973 Heinselman, M. L. Fire in the virgin forests of the Boundary Waters Canoe Area, Minnesota. Quaternary Research 3: 329-382. https://www.cambridge.org/core/journals/quaternary-research/article/abs/fire-in-the-virgin-forests-of-the-boundary-waters-canoe-area-minnesota/38BF8410A63D369D268F40482AFBF8B5
- 1977 Heinselman, Miron L. Crisis in the Canoe Country. The Living Wilderness 40 (136): 12-24.
- 1977 Heinselman, M. L. Testimony of Miron L. Heinselman, Chairman Friends of the Boundary Waters Wilderness, Before the U.S. House of Representatives, Subcommittee on National Parks and Insular Affairs re: Boundary Waters Canoe Area Wilderness Legislation, Washington, DC, Sept. 1977, in support of H.R. 2820 – The Fraser Bill. 48 pp.
- 1978 Heinselman, M. L. Fire in wilderness ecosystems. Chapter (pp. 249–278) In Hendee, J. C., Stankey, G. H., and Lucas, R. C., Wilderness Management, USDA Forest Service Misc. Pub. 1365, U.S. Gov. Printing Office, Wash., DC, 381 pp. https://www.frames.gov/catalog/1719
- 1981 Heinselman, M. L. Fire intensity and frequency as factors in the distribution and structure of northern ecosystems. In Mooney, H., Bonnicksen, J. M., Christensen, N. L., Lotan, J. E., and Reiners, W. A. (eds.), Fire Regimes and Ecosystem Properties, USDA Forest Service, Gen. Tech. Report WO-26, pp. 7–57. https://archive.org/details/CAT83781017/page/n9/mode/2up.
- 1981 Heinselman, Miron L. Fire and succession in the conifer forests of northern North America. In West, D. C., Shugart, H. H., and Botkin, D. B. (eds.), Forest Succession: Concepts and Application. New York: Springer-Verlag, pp. 374–405. https://link.springer.com/chapter/10.1007%2F978-1-4612-5950-3_23
- 1985 Heinselman, Miron L. Fire regimes and management options in ecosystems with large high-intensity fires. In Proc., Symposium and Workshop on Wilderness Fire, USDA Forest Service Gen. Tech. Report INT-182, April 1985, pp. 101–109. Symposium Nov. 15-18, 1983, Missoula, Mont. https://www.frames.gov/catalog/2520.
- 1995 Proescholdt, Kevin, Rapson, Rip, and Heinselman, Miron L. Troubled Waters: The Fight for the Boundary Waters Canoe Area Wilderness. St. Cloud, Minn., North Star Press of St. Cloud, 332 pp.
- 1996 Heinselman, Miron. The Boundary Waters Wilderness Ecosystem. Minneapolis, Univ. of Minn. Press, 1996, 335 pp.
