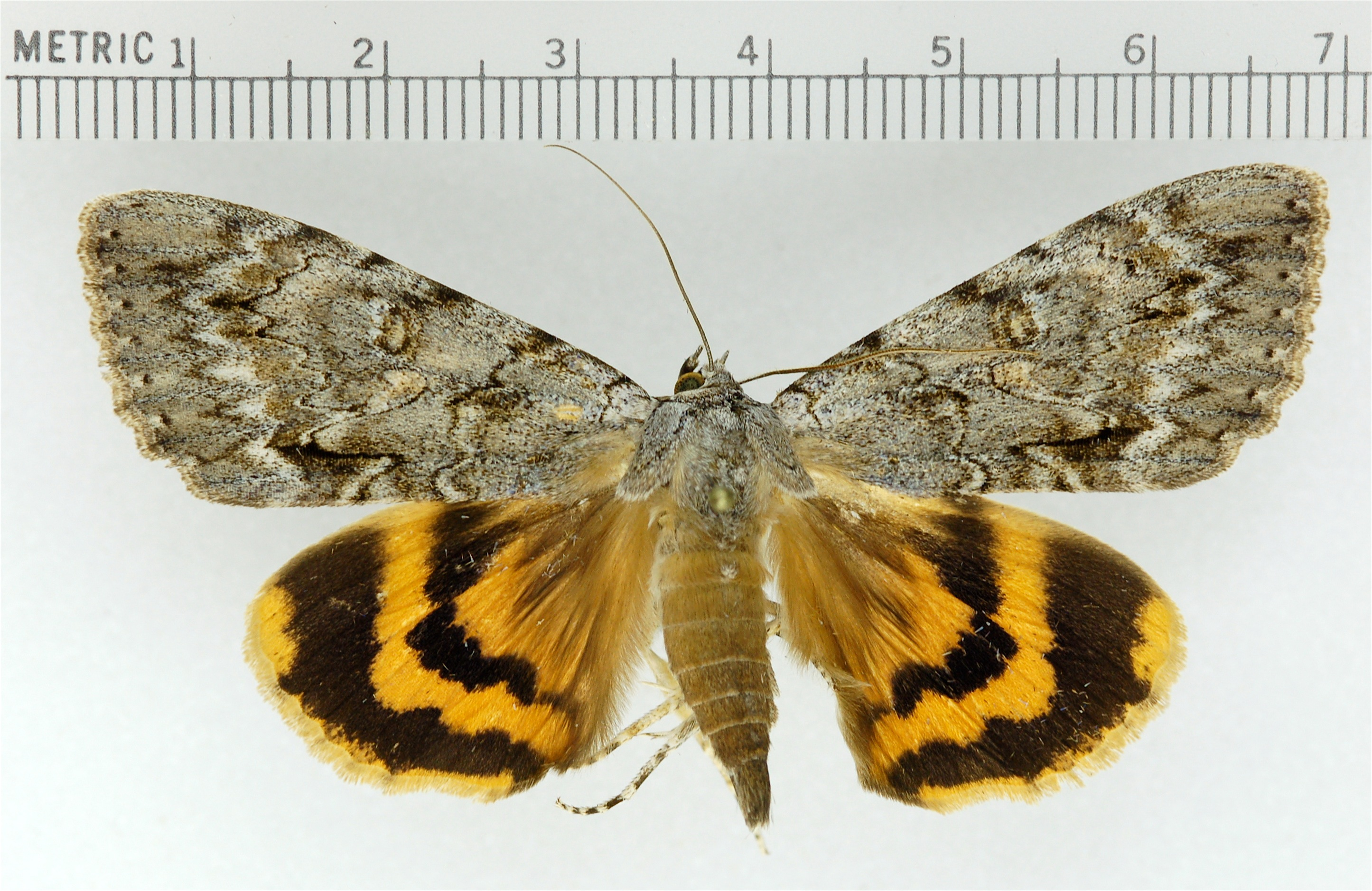

Scientific classification
- Kingdom: Animalia
- Phylum: Arthropoda
- Class: Insecta
- Order: Lepidoptera
- Superfamily: Noctuoidea
- Family: Erebidae
- Genus: Catocala
- Species: C. habilis

Binomial name
- Catocala habilis Grote, 1872

Synonyms
- Catabapta habilis; Catocala basalis Grote, 1876; Catocala denussa Ehrman, 1893

= Catocala habilis =

Habilis underwing

Species of moth

Catocala habilis, the habilis underwing, is a moth of the family Erebidae. The species was first described by Augustus Radcliffe Grote in 1872. It is found in North America from Quebec, Ontario, Manitoba, and New Brunswick south through Connecticut and New Jersey to North Carolina and west to Arkansas.

The wingspan is 55–65 mm. Adults are on wing from June to October depending on the location. There is probably one generation per year.

The larvae feed on Carya ovata, Fraxinus pennsylvanica, Juglans cinerea, and Juglans nigra.
