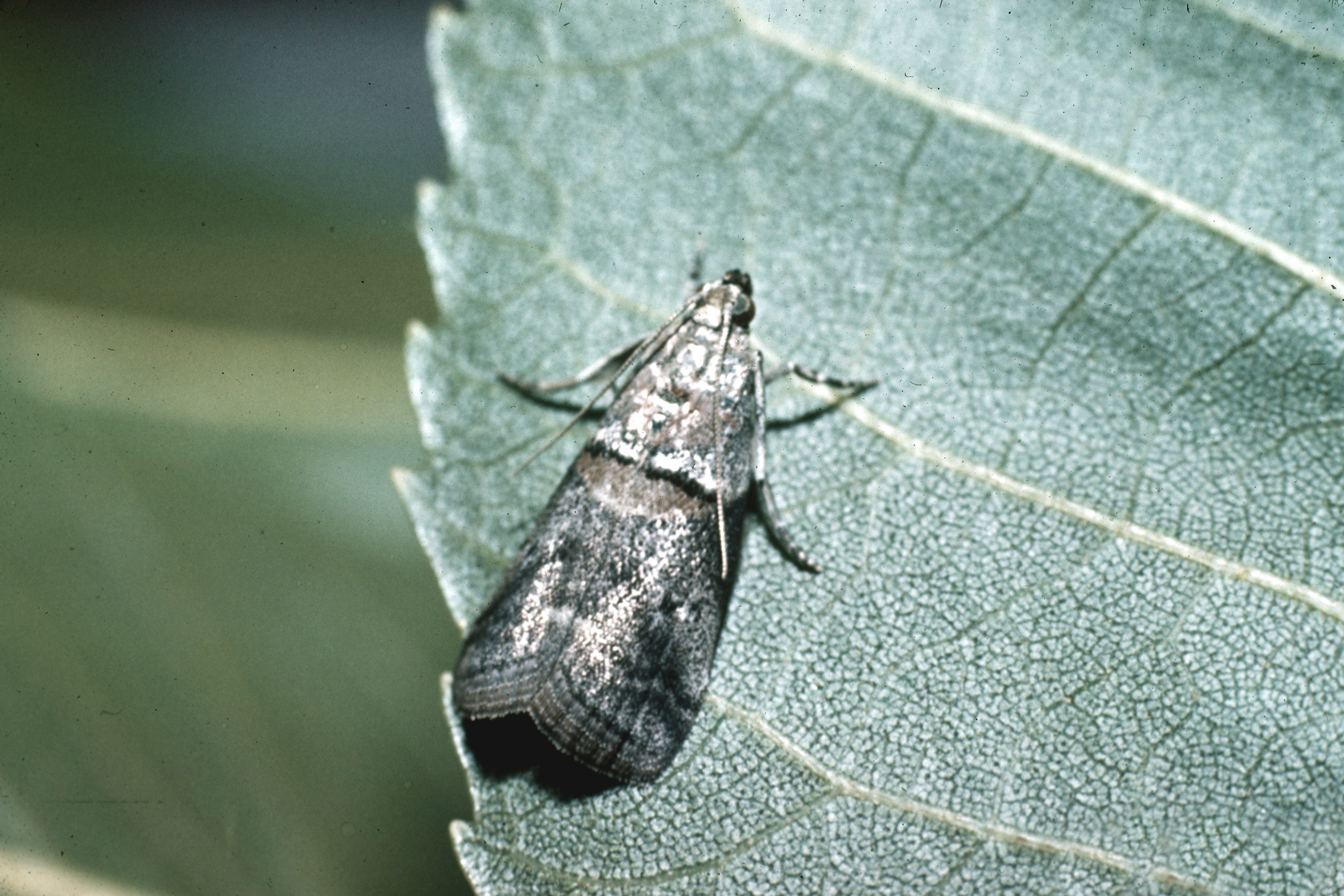

Scientific classification
- Kingdom: Animalia
- Phylum: Arthropoda
- Clade: Pancrustacea
- Class: Insecta
- Order: Lepidoptera
- Family: Pyralidae
- Genus: Acrobasis
- Species: A. juglandis

Binomial name
- Acrobasis juglandis (LeBaron, 1872)

Synonyms
- Phycita juglandis LeBaron, 1872

= Acrobasis juglandis =

Species of moth

Acrobasis juglandis, the pecan leaf casebearer, is a moth of the family Pyralidae. It is found in Ontario, from Vermont south to Florida and from North Dakota to New Mexico.

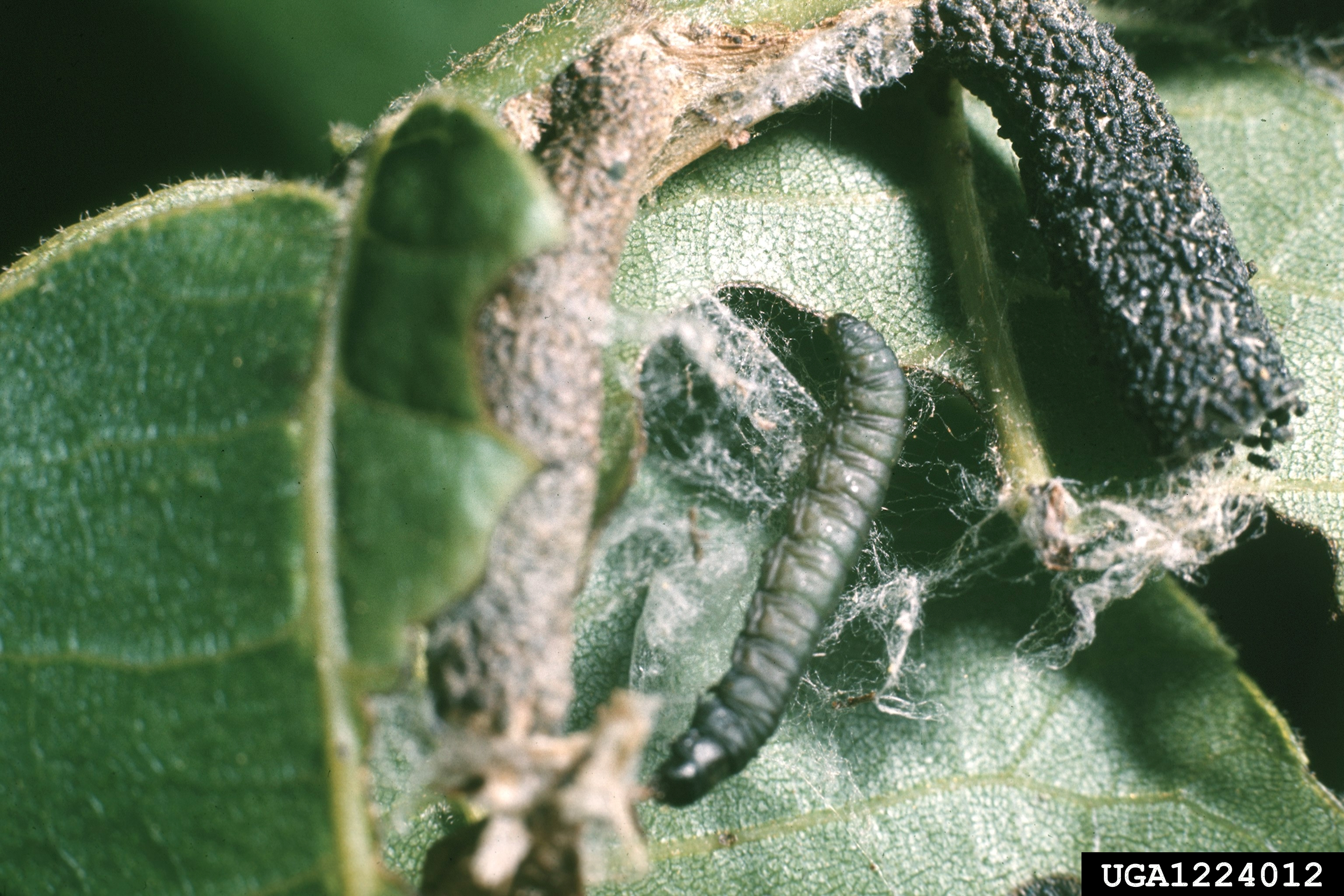
Larva and case

Its wingspan is about 18 mm.

The larva feeds on Carya illinoinensis, Juglans nigra, Juglans cinerea and Juglans microcarpa.
