= Canoe area =

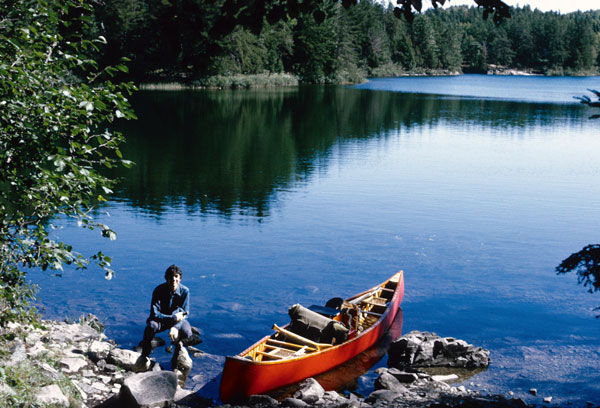
A canoer and her canoe at the Boundary Waters Canoe Area

A canoe area is a type of wilderness area in the United States, part of the National Wilderness Preservation System. There are two designated canoe areas:

- Boundary Waters Canoe Area Wilderness – 1,090,000 acres (440,000 ha) in northeastern Minnesota (Boundary Waters), this canoe area was created with the 1978 federal Boundary Waters Canoe Area Wilderness Act.
- Saint Regis Canoe Area - 18,400 acres (7,400 ha) in New York (Adirondack Park)

Canoe areas are popular destinations for canoeing and related activities, such as canoe camping.

== See also ==
- Outline of canoeing
- Protected areas of the United States
- Wilderness area
