= Canoe Country Outfitters =

Canoe company in Ely, Minnesota

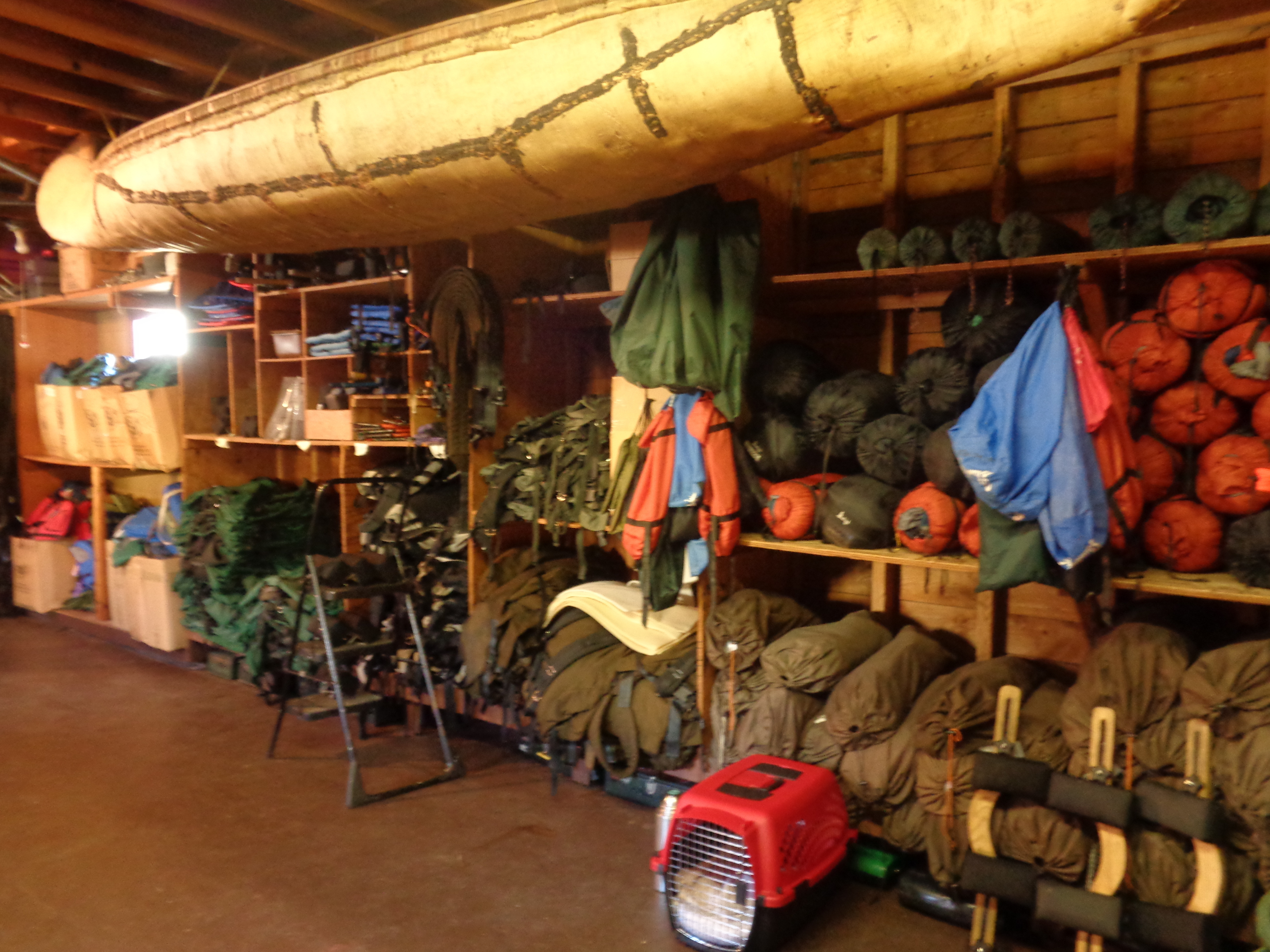
CCO Sheridan St. HQ

Canoe Country Outfitters was formed in 1946 in Ely, Minnesota, to provide canoe trip outfitting services for Quetico Provincial Park and Superior National Forest and what was to become Boundary Waters Canoe Area Wilderness (BWCAW). Bill Rom started the business and then sold it to Bob Olson Sr. (who had already worked there for 25 years) in 1975. At times they have been dubbed to be the largest canoe outfitter in the world. They operate from two locations, one in downtown [ Ely, Minnesota, the other on Moose lake, about 20 miles east of Ely.

Many key CCO personnel became well known in their own right. Bill Rom was an outspoken activist for the preservation of the BWCAW and also an author.

Their current area of outfitting operations includes all entry points of Boundary Waters Canoe Area Wilderness, Superior National Forest & Quetico Provincial Park, with a focus on those typically accessed from Ely, Minnesota.

== History ==
Canoe Country Outfitters (CCO) was formed in 1946 as Bill Rom's Canoe Country Outfitters in Ely, Minnesota, to provide canoe trip outfitting services for Quetico Provincial Park and Superior National Forest and what was to become the Boundary Waters Canoe Area Wilderness. At times they have been dubbed to be the largest canoe outfitter in the world. In an overview of larger outfitters in the US, a 1976 New York Times article dubbed Bill Rom and his CCO operation as the "canoe king" based on keeping 600 canoes in operation with its customers throughout the canoeing season. "A 1960's article by Argosy magazine dubbed Bill the "Canoe King of Ely" and for good reason. Canoe Country Outfitters was the largest canoe outfitter in the world and the largest Grumman canoe dealer in North America" with 400 canoes in use. In 1966 Motor Club News magazine identified them as "the world's largest outfitting company". with 450 canoes in use. In 1975 the Ely Echo newspaper described them as having 500 canoes in use with 35 employees and said that they had been "rated as the largest such enterprise in the world". During its early years, CCO was the only canoeing outfitter in Ely although Sigurd Olson's Border Lakes Outfitters was already in operation in nearby Winton. In 1958 Sports Afield magazine dubbed them the largest outfitter in Ely. By 1963 they had switched to using all aluminum canoes; previously they had used canvas canoes but dropped them because they weighed 20 lbs more, were harder to carry, and didn't handle as well. Rom's four children: Bill Jr., Rebecca, Larry, and Roger began working for him and started guiding canoe trips at as young as 12, and Bill Rom Jr. did so professionally starting at age 14.

Historical Society copies indicate that in the early 1950s CCO distributed and utilized Calvin Rutstrum publications and a pamphlet designed for canoeing outfitters. The business also provided lodging. One author described the lodging operations circa 1956 as a motel behind the business.

In their Lynda Plays it Cool article, The Milwaukee Sentinel Newspaper covered a trip outfitted by CCO and guided by CCO employee Stan Germek by Lynda Johnson, daughter of then-president Lyndon B. Johnson.

Charles Kuralt visited the Moose Lake location in his television series. He profiled employee Bill Magie, and their outfitting of and participation in his trip and their visit to Dorothy Molter on her island in Knife Lake. He subsequently also covered this in his book "Charles Kuralt's America". John Perushek worked for CCO for 40 years.

In 1958 Delbert "Dub" Ehret began taking groups to Canoe Country Outfitters for canoe trips into the BWCA. This began a long-standing relationship with Bill Rom and his family. Ehret's trips continued, introducing 650 persons to BWCA trips.

Bill Rom's daughter Becky worked as a guide. She appeared on the TV show "To Tell the Truth" and stumped the panel because none thought that a young teenage girl could be guiding wilderness canoe trips.

=== Bill Rom ===
Bill Rom's parents immigrated to the United States from Yugoslavia, now Slovenia, in the late 1800s. Bill Rom was born in 1917 on the edge of the wilderness in the Ely, Minnesota, area. Except for short periods when he was in school and the military, he lived there all of his life. After serving in the Navy during World War II, he married Barbara Berlin of Kent, Washington, and together they started Bill Rom's Canoe Country Outfitters in 1946. Rom associated with then-dean Sigurd Olson when he went to college and credited Olson with "inspiring his passion for the preservation of wilderness".

William N. Rom published Canoe Country Wilderness in 1987 chronicling his ventures to all of the 1200 canoeable lakes in the Quetico Provincial Park and additional 1200 lakes in the Boundary Waters Canoe Area Wilderness. He was a professional canoe guide from 1959 to 1968. He also canoed the border route to Lake Superior along the 9-mile Grand Portage, canoed around Hunter's Island in 40 hours, and completed the Ely-Atikokan 100-mile Canoe Race through the wilderness in a best time of 19 hours. He was a guide for a Hudson Bay canoe trip down the Albany River, paddled 1517 miles from the Peace River, Alberta, to Fort Chipewyan across Lake Athabasca and down the Churchill River to Hudson Bay, and canoed 300 miles of the Back River in Northwest Territories (now Nunavut).

Rom and his friend (and later employee) Bill Magie were outspoken activists for the preservation of the BWCAW. Rom incurred the wrath of many for taking positions for banning or reductions of motorized access, cans and bottles in what is now the BWCAW. Both Rom and Magie were avid seaplane pilots however they advocated for noise controlling legislation that regulated seaplane altitudes. After a valve replacement, Bill Rom hiked the Kekekabic Trail, a 46-mile hike, in a few days to prove his fitness to the FAA and retain his pilot's license. Later he also had a fly-in camp on Lake Harris in southern Ontario.

He testified with Sigurd Olson against logging in the Superior Roadless Area in 1964 at the Selke Commission in Ely, MN. He organized a 1970 Earth Day Symposium at Northrup Auditorium at the University of Minnesota including Bill Magie and Clayton Rudd (editor, The Naturalist) on the Boundary Waters Canoe Area. In 1978, he testified for the Boundary Waters Canoe Area Wilderness Bill on the impact of canoe outfitting on the regional economy.

During the debate over airspace reservation, an explosive was set off near the Rom family home as a scare tactic. During the motorized and snowmobile BWCAW use debates of the 70s, snowmobiles circled the Rom's house at all hours of the night. In 1974 Rom testified in Washington against motorized access. In 1975, during the important fishing opener and Memorial Day weekend, persons unhappy with his efforts blocked the entrance to his business with logging trucks. Upon his death, his daughter, Becky Rom, said: "He felt the wilderness was the best economy for Ely, because it was forever. Bill Rom died at the age of 90 in 2008. He was survived by his wife, Barbara Rom, four children, and seven grandchildren. Bill and Barb were recipients of the 2006 Friends of the Boundary Waters Conservation award. Barb Rom died March 25, 2017, at age 96. Usage of the area has grown. When Rom started the business in 1946 it didn't seem possible that the BWCA wilderness could ever be crowded.

=== Gerald R. Patterson ===
Gerald R. Patterson (1926-2016), subject of the book "A Guide's Tale", guided for CCO. Prior to that he guided for Sigurd Olson's Border Lakes Outfitting Company. Prior to that he was a swamper (and then a guide) for the just-opened BSA Region 10 Canoe Base (now BSA's Charles Sommers national canoe base) on Moose lake.

=== Bill Magie ===
Bill Magie, based at their Moose Lake base, guided canoe trips and ran that base when not guiding. He retired in 1979 at age 77. In 1949 he founded the Friends of the Wilderness, forerunner organization to the Friends of the Boundary Waters Wilderness. Amongst the celebrities that he guided on canoe trips were Hubert H Humphrey, Zsa Zsa Gabor, and anthropologist and author Margaret Mead. He was amongst the first pilots in Minnesota, his pilot's license was issued by Orville Wright, then chairman of the National Aeronautic Association. He helped establish the first air mail service between Duluth and Port Arthur, Ontario (now Thunder Bay). He had a license suspension "when he flew his Curtiss Jenny biplane "in a half-loop and 180-degree twist" under Duluth's Aerial Bridge on a $50 bet." Starting in 1925, for 5 years he worked for the U.S. Army Corps of Engineers "on the first extensive survey on what was to become the Boundary Waters Canoe Area. The work continued year-around and during the deep of winter Magie often traveled alone by dog sled."

=== Transfer to the Olsons ===
Rom sold the business in 1975 to Bob Olson Sr. who had already worked there for 25 years. "His whole family, in fact, worked for me, and they're still working in the business and doing very well. We had no problem turning it over to him, and he has no problem taking it over." The Olsons continue to own and operate Canoe Country Outfitters. Bob Olson Sr. has been with CCO since 1950 when he went to work there as a canoe trip guide. Rom credited their success to an emphasis on high grade service and high grade and innovative equipment.

=== Bob Olson Sr. ===
Bob Olson Sr. was born February 12, 1933, to Mayme and Eino Olson. In 1939 or 1940 his family moved to Winton, MN. When he was 13 or 14 he would hang out at Border Lakes Outfitting in Winton, then managed by Sigurd Olson. Sig would give them leftover food from returning groups and then Bob Olson and his friends would take trips into the wilderness which ended when the food ran out. Bob started working for CCO the first summer after his high school graduation. He has been married to Pat Olson since July 1952. Starting in 1953 he then worked at the Pioneer mine in Ely, MN and then accepted the position of manager of CCO in 1964. Bob bought the business in 1975; he remains at Canoe Country Outfitters but his sons run the operation.

Olson's tenure in Quetico pre-dated many of the current regulations. In an article about canoe races in Quetico, Don Beland quipped that he and Bob Olson had completed the Hunter Island loop (where only canoes are allowed) in under 24 hours, much faster than the then-current record of 33 hours and 38 minutes but "with a three horse motor". In a 1993 interview by Men's Journal magazine. Bob Olson Sr. said: "There were a few people who like going back there with a canoe to fish.....but we never figured on crowds. Now you have to get a permit."

== Operations ==
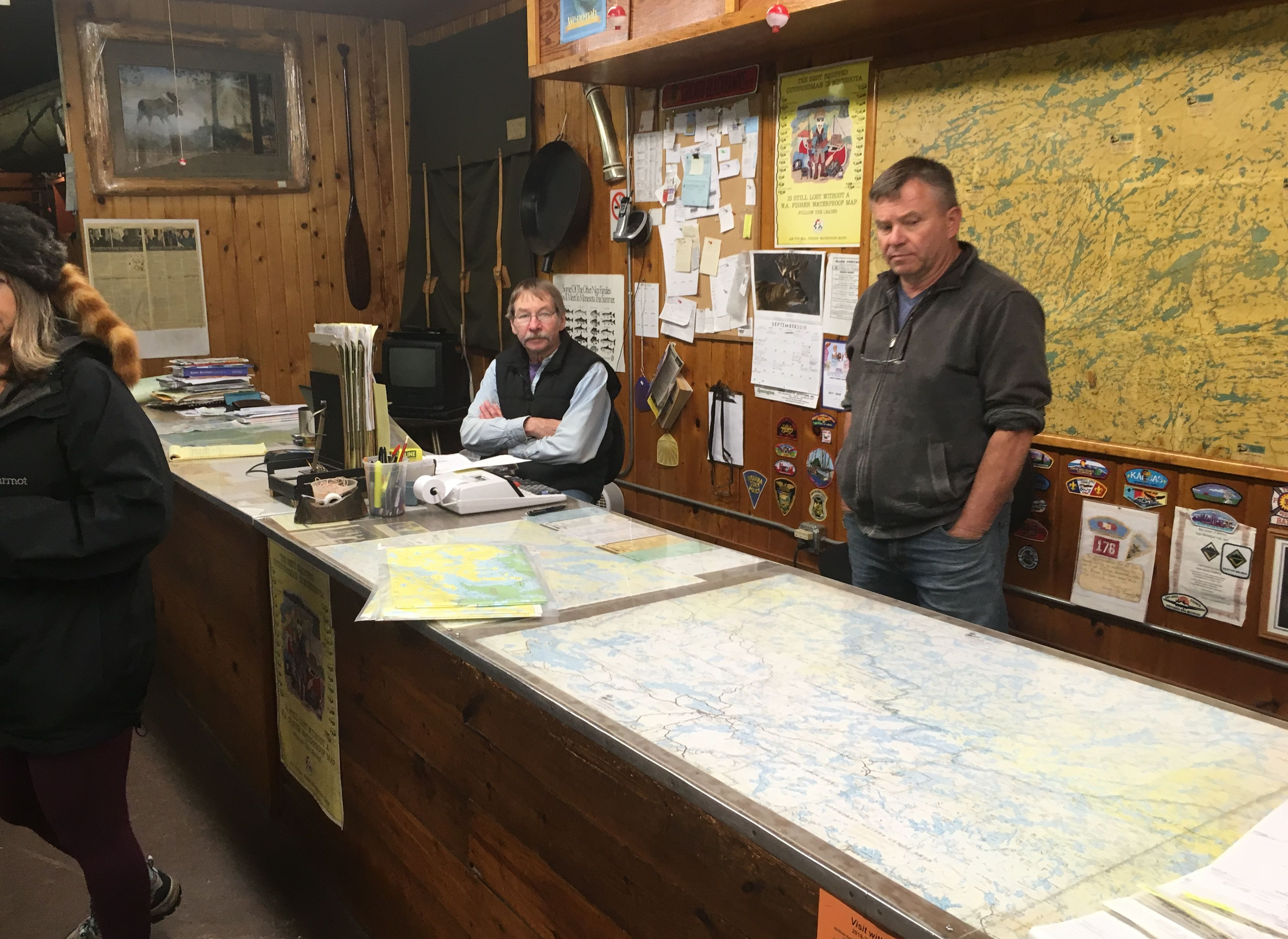
Outfitting managers Bob Olson Jr. and Mark Olson at Sheridan St. headquarters

Canoe Country Outfitters operates from 2 locations. One is their headquarters and other buildings in downtown Ely, Minnesota, and the other is their facility on Moose lake (a lake about 20 miles East of Ely) which serves as a base for trips launched from that lake and also has cabins, docks, a bunkhouse and a campground. Moose lake is the most popular entry point into the BWCAW / Quetico wilderness, with the BWCA beginning 3/4 mile by water from their Moose lake facility. As of 1975 they had 500 canoes for rent. They provide outfitting services for trips in the Boundary Waters Canoe Area Wilderness, Quetico Provincial Park and the Superior National Forest. They provide full, partial, standard and ultralight canoe outfitting services. They also provide tow and livery services, lodging, Basswood Lake base camp fishing, and a campground. They also sell canoes that have been used in their outfitting operations. Lodging offerings include cabins at their Moose Lake location, bunkhouses at both of their locations and motel lodging at their Ely location.

=== BWCA and Quetico entry points ===
CCO provides outfitting for BWCA and Quetico entry points as well as entry points on the Gunflint Trail and northern Quetico Provincial Park entry points in the vicinity of Atikokan Ontario.

=== Management and personnel ===
Bob Olson Sr. remains at Canoe Country Outfitters but his sons run the operation. Core personnel include three sons (Mark, Bob Jr. and Bruce) one grandson (Brian, son of Mark) and one daughter-in-law (Kathleen wife of Bob Jr.). Bob Jr. & Mark focus on the outfitting business and Bruce focuses on their Moose Lake operation.
