= Fall Lake =

Fall Lake may refer to:

- Fall Lake (Minnesota), a lake in Minnesota
- Fall Lake, Minnesota
- Fall Lake Township, Minnesota
- Fall Lake (New York), a lake in New York
