= National Wilderness Conference =

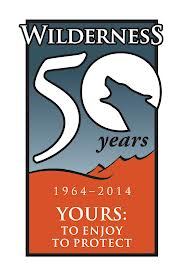
- Date: October 15-19, 2014
- Locations: Albuquerque, NM
- Website: wilderness50.org

The 50th Anniversary National Wilderness Conference is the culminating commemorative event for the 50th anniversary of the Wilderness Act. The conference was held in Albuquerque, NM, from October 15-19, 2014.

== Conference ==
This conference is a multi-day event including presentations, panel discussions, exhibits, field trips, and skill-development workshops. The conference will provide ample opportunity to network and share ideas, celebrate recent successes, share lessons learned, and discuss emerging challenges in wilderness stewardship. Conference tracks will include history, stewardship, education, experience, civic engagement, and science.

== Conference Goals ==
The conference is convened to provide a forum for discussing growing challenges to wilderness values while deepening and enabling participants’ engagement in wilderness stewardship in a time of unprecedented environmental and social change; meanwhile, it also aims to honor the achievement of a half-century of permanent protection for America’s wild places under the Wilderness Act.

== Organizer ==
The National Wilderness Conference was produced by Wilderness50, a diverse coalition of non-profit organizations, government agencies, and academic institutions—including the Pew Charitable Trusts, Wilderness Society, Sierra Club, Back Country Horsemen of America, Leave No Trace Center for Outdoor Ethics, Conservation Lands Foundation, Bureau of Land Management, Fish and Wildlife Service, Forest Service, and National Park Service.

== See also ==
- National Wilderness Preservation System
- List of U.S. Wilderness Areas
- Natural heritage
- Wilderness Act of 1964
- Eastern Wilderness Act of 1974
- Boundary Waters Canoe Area Wilderness Act of 1978
- Alaska National Interest Lands Conservation Act of 1980
- California Wilderness Act of 1984
- Northern California Coastal Wild Heritage Wilderness Act of 2006
- Omnibus Public Land Management Act of 2009
