= Calvin Rutstrum =

American author (1895–1982)

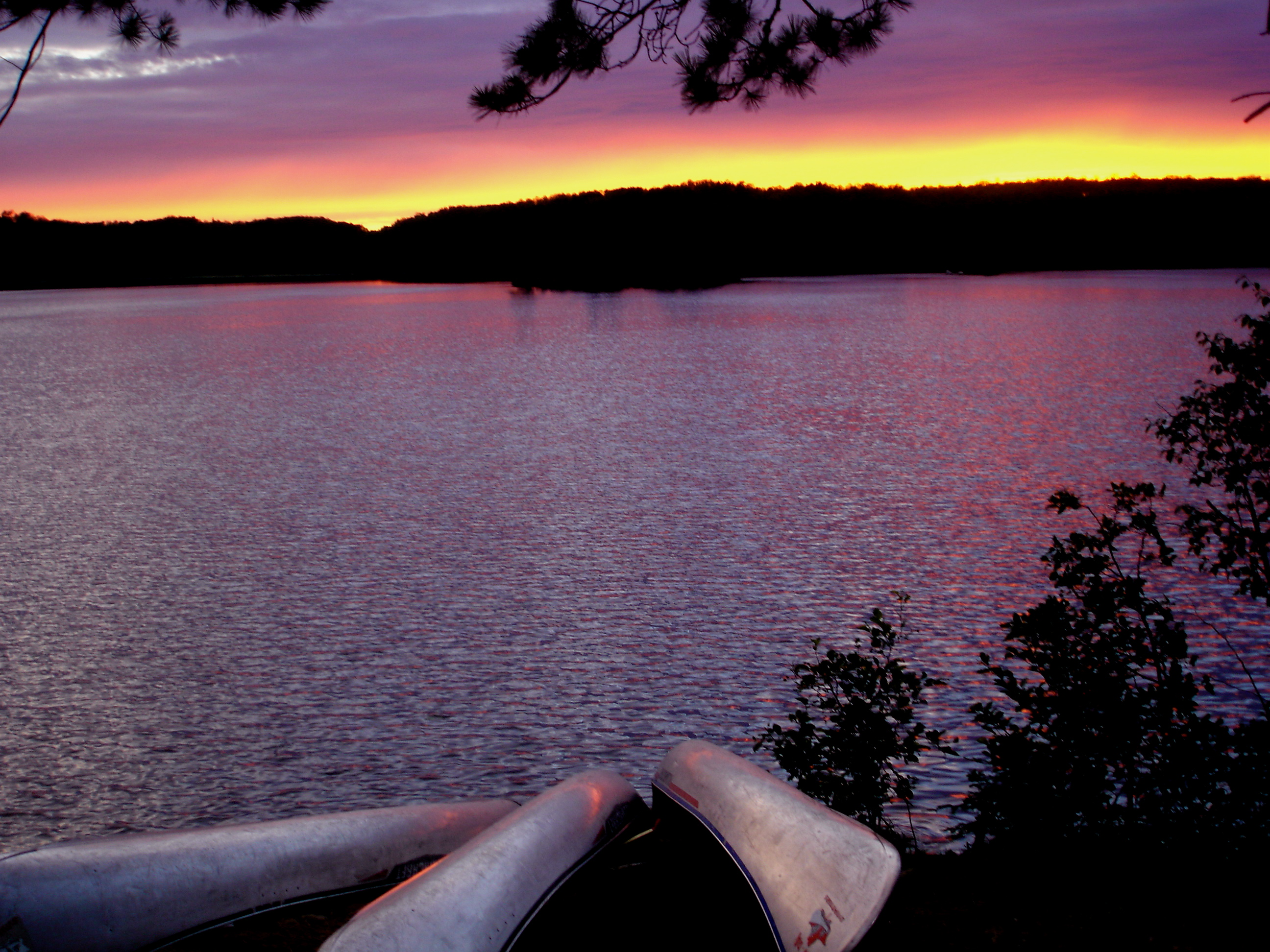
Quetico Superior, a part of the area that Rutstrum traveled in and wrote about

Calvin Rutstrum (October 26, 1895 – February 5, 1982) was an American writer who wrote fifteen books, most relating to wilderness camping experiences and techniques. Most of his books were written at his cabin on Cloud Bay, Ontario.

"His wilderness experiences begin just before WWI and span the modern era including the environmental movement of the late 1960s and 1970s. He published his books starting in 1946 and continued to publish right up to near his death in 1982. ...Throughout his life he lived many experiences and held several jobs.....his writing skills were primarily self-taught from reading....Many of these jobs he held just long enough to set himself up for some time in the wilderness. Many of his wilderness years were spent wandering the Canadian Shield or the Boundary Waters area of Minnesota on long canoe, walking, or sledding trips. Over the course of his life he also maintained or built several residences-Canadian and Minnesota cabins, a Marine-on-St. Croix home and a New Mexico ranch home."

== Youth ==
Rutstrum was born in Hobart, Indiana, on October 26, 1895, a son of Swedish immigrants. Within three years they had moved to Chicago, and then St. Paul, Minnesota. His father died of pneumonia when he was about three years old. Rutstrum dropped out of school in the seventh grade at age 13. Soon after that he began his working and adventuring life. Though his mother remarried, the family had little money and Rutstrum worked at a wide range of odd jobs, some of them entrepreneurial, at a very young age. At the same young age he also sought to maximize his time exploring and playing in his neighborhood's hardwood forest.

Rutstrum was also drawn to the Mississippi River. Before the age of 12 he had spent weeks traveling on it with his friends, often riding log booms. As he wrote later, there he was:

"a healthy young animal with less than a dozen years from birth, alive in the early summer sunshine, barefooted, youthfully entranced, eager as spring for life, as intrinsically a part of the river. I believed, as the waterthrush that foraged at the mouth of Minnehaha Creek, where the rippling current joined the mighty Mississippi...To be free as a wild creature, not having to shoulder human cares, able to climb, run, jump. swim, lie on an embankment in the sunshine—these gave a release to the young spirit that may be perhaps described as primitive, but nevertheless exquisite in the most elemental sense.

At age 16, after acquiring his 30-30 carbine, .22 rifle, fishing tackle, ammunition, tent, bedroll, axe, knife, cook kit, and $25, he spent $24 of that for passage to Montana when he worked at a ranch riding fence in the summers and spent winters in a log cabin (line shack) in the mountains. Rutstrum began his first long canoe trip at age 18, a 100-day trip in the wilderness in northern Minnesota.

== Adult life ==
He served in World War I as a Navy medical corpsman, and as a criminal bank investigator for 10 years, and as a camp instructor and guide. Later he made money by buying and selling land. In the early 1920s Rutstrum bought, subdivided and sold three 40 acre tracts on the northwest shore of Lake Superior. This, combined with his limited lifestyle requirements provided a significant large step towards financial independence, where jobs became superfluous.

Early in his life he lived in a cabin on the Flute Reed river along Lake Superior's northwest shore between Grand Marais and Duluth. His next home was a cabin on an island in Sea Gull Lake, near the end of the Gunflint Trail in Minnesota where he lived for 10 years. Later, as this became too developed for him, he moved to Marchington Lake, about 30 miles east of Sioux Lookout, Ontario. He then built a stone house in Marine-on-St. Croix, Minnesota, which became his primary residence, while retaining his Ontario cabin. He also built a home on Cloud Bay, Lake Superior. He intended it to be a "simple little house" but zoning regulations forced it to be more substantial. His wife Florence had been visiting Mexico with her aunt every year, and coaxed Cal to head southwest. Rutstrum and his wife Florence bought an adobe house in Puerto De Luna, New Mexico, in the Pecos River Valley, which they remodeled and modernized. They lived there part-time for seven years in the early 1960s. He decided that life there was unpleasant, and sold it back to its original owners.

=== Emergence as an author ===
His first book was Way of the Wilderness illustrated by Les Kouba. It taught readers how to live well in the wilderness, including in cold weather, and traveling by canoe. This book started as a wilderness manual written for Camp Lincoln, where he worked for 10 years. He then rewrote it for Macmillan publishing company who published it in 1946 as a hardcover because they suspected it would be successful. The Outdoor Book Club immediately ordered 52,000 copies. As he later recalled, he then said "this beats working". It is still considered a bible for serious canoeists. His next book The New Way of the Wilderness (illustrated by Les Kouba) expertly covered how to equip and dress for winter, canoe camping, and how to eat well while wilderness camping. After that The Wilderness Cabin described how to build log cabins and fireplaces. North American Canoe Country covered wilderness canoe travel, including many specialized topics. Wilderness Route Finder focused on such using traditional methods.

Paradise Below Zero covered long term sub-zero (Fahrenheit) wilderness camping and travel. It is both a "how to" book but with much inspirational and philosophical content in line with the title. The era of the book (1968) preceded the prevalence of newer camping products and materials. Paradise Below Zero is considered to be a bible for extended sub-zero camping without the use of modern equipment. He wrote his autobiography Challenge of the Wilderness which was published in 1970. It was reprinted in 1979 as A Wilderness Autobiography.

Back Country was his final book, published in 1981. It was a storytelling book about backcountry characters with whom he had friendships or experiences. In a conversation with Jim Dale Vickery, Rutstrum characterized this book as being about "just the romance of the wilderness".

== Prominence ==
The book "Wilderness Visionaries" included Rutstrum on a list of eight (North American) wilderness visionaries along with Henry David Thoreau, John Muir, Aldo Leopold, Robert Service, Bob Marshall, Olaus Johan Murie and Sigurd Olson. As with most of the others, his writing skills and published works contributed to his prominence. These combined with his expertise in wilderness living and travel, including in harsh conditions as well as his wilderness philosophies and experiences.

As recreational use of wilderness areas began to rapidly grow, Rutstrum's writings were in the middle of it. The book Wilderness Visionaries said "In a sense, he became a high priest of an emerging camping cult." His books captured both the "how to" and the pleasure of longer term wilderness travel and camping. Rutstrum and Bradford Angier were the two most prominent writers with this combination at the time.

His life followed the philosophy espoused in his writings...prioritizing one's life for time in the wilderness, and the benefits of such.

== Books authored by Rutstrum ==
Rutstrum's 15 books described his enchantment of the wilderness and instructed readers on preparing for and conducting trips (especially canoe trips) into remote areas. Rutstrum's published works include:

=== Way of the Wilderness 1946 ===
His first book Way of the Wilderness was published in 1946. He wrote it during his 10-year tenure as the Director of The Lake Hubert Minnesota Camps. It is essentially straightforward teaching manual for the curriculum of the camp. This book was published by the Burgess Publishing Company, Minneapolis, MN. It was illustrated by Don Cederberg.

=== Way of the Wilderness 1952 ===
Way of the Wilderness is a book evolved from his 1946 version, but was significantly changed and evolved to where it is considered to be a different book. This includes removal of the material specific to the camp. It was also published by Burgess. The Outdoors Magazine reviewer's copy was stamped "Bill Rom's Canoe Country Outfitters.....Ely Minnesota" leading the reviewer to surmise that it may have been written for and distributed by canoe outfitters.

=== Memoranda for Canoe Country 1953 ===
This as a 38-page booklet published by Burgess. A smaller "quick tips" version of this was distributed through Canoe Country Outfitters.

=== The New Way of the Wilderness 1958 ===
This was a publisher-requested rewrite of his previous books to become his first general market publication. It is the final evolution from his previous three books and booklet.

=== The Wilderness Cabin 1961 ===
During his lifetime, Rutstrum built several cabins. This is a book on how to build a cabin.

=== North American Canoe Country 1964 ===
North American Canoe Country is Rutstrum's first book length expansion on canoeing. It is 276 pages, published by Macmillan (New York) and, according to Outdoors Magazine, superbly illustrated by Les Kouba.

=== Wilderness Route Finder 1967 ===
This was illustrated by Les Kouba and originally published by Macmillan. It was later reprinted by Collier and then by the University of Minnesota Press. This is a book on wilderness navigation written before the availability of high quality maps for wilderness areas and GPS. The methods he covers include map and compass, stars, sextant and radio direction finding.

=== Paradise Below Zero 1968 ===
Paradise Below Zero covered long term sub-zero (Fahrenheit) wilderness camping and travel. It is both a "how to" book but with much inspirational and philosophical content in line with the title. The era of the book (1968) preceded the prevalence of newer camping products and materials, yet to this day it points out the unsuitability of many current winter camping techniques (even with high tech equipment) when applied to prolonged camping at temperatures below zero Fahrenheit. Paradise Below Zero is considered to be a bible for extended sub-zero camping without the use of modern equipment.

=== Challenge of the Wilderness 1970 ===
Challenge of the Wilderness is Rutstrum's autobiography. It is less detailed and less complete than a typical autobiography; Rutstrum chose certain areas to cover and expand on, and others to leave out. It is 196 pages and published by TS Denison, Minneapolis. It is illustrated by Les Kouba and includes some photographs taken by Rutstrum. It was republished with very few changes as A Wilderness Autobiography in 1979.

=== Greenhorns in the Southwest 1972 ===
Rutstrum found, fixed up and lived in an adobe house along the Pecos River in New Mexico. This book is somewhat of an autobiography of that period. One reviewer said that it is possibly the least appealing of his books; that even his writing style in it reflected that he was out of his element when living there. The book was first published by TS Denison. It was later republished as a 176-page softcover by the University of New Mexico Press.

=== Once Upon a Wilderness (1973) ===
Once Upon a Wilderness was a larger departure from Rutstrum's "how to" books. In it embarks on more story telling and discussion of the meaning of wilderness. This is a 181-page book originally published by Macmillan. It has subsequently been re-issued by the University of Minnesota. Reviews have it as one of his books most worth reading and owning.

=== The Wilderness Life (1975) ===
This is a collection of stories and essays. It is more about wilderness philosophy with less "how to" material. A reviewer has called it "just a joy to read" and a "must have" amongst Rutstrum's books. The book is 241 pages and was published by Macmillan and illustrated by Les Kouba. It was also reissued by the University of Minnesota.

=== Chips from a Wilderness Log (1978) ===
This book has 244 pages and was published by Stein and Day, New York. It includes photographs by Rutstrum and was illustrated by Gary Jones. This book is a collection of stories, tips and thoughts that Rutstrum had collected. It is rated as a "good to own" one of Rutstrum's books.

=== A Wilderness Autobiography (1979) ===
This book is a near-duplicate of Challenge of the Wilderness.

=== Other books ===
- Hiking Back to Health (1980)
- A Columnist Looks at Life, Here's Cal Rutstrum (1981)
- Backcountry (1981)

== Final years ==
Rutstrum died on February 5, 1982, in Osceola, Wisconsin, survived by his wife Florence. Four years before, in Chips from a Wilderness log Rutstrum wrote: "If you want to do something for me after I'm gone, live so as to not defile the precious earth".
