= Friends of the Boundary Waters Wilderness =

U.S. non-profit organization

The Friends of the Boundary Waters, based in Minneapolis, Minnesota, is a non-profit organization formed in May 1976, with a mission to "To protect, preserve and restore the wilderness character of the Boundary Waters Canoe Area Wilderness and the Quetico-Superior Ecosystem."

The Friends have played a pivotal role in increasing the size of the wilderness area and limiting motor usage in accordance with the Wilderness Act. It has also had a major role in establishing the nation's first acid rain laws to protect Minnesota's aquatic ecosystems, increased buffer zones for aircraft flying over wilderness areas, and raised public awareness on the issues surrounding copper-nickel and other non-taconite mining and logging near the wilderness area.

== History ==
=== Battles to Establish the Boundary Waters Canoe Area Wilderness ===
In May 1976 The Friends of the Boundary Waters was formed with Bud Heinselman as chairman in opposition to Representative James Oberstar's bill that would have split the Boundary Waters Canoe Area Wilderness into two areas. The proposed bill would have kept 625,000 acres (253,000 ha; 977 sq mi) as wilderness, while 527,000 acres (213,000 ha; 823 sq mi) would have been declared a National Recreation Area that would remain open to motorized use, logging, and mining. The Friends of the Boundary Waters supported Representative Bruce Vento's bill that kept all of the Boundary Waters as wilderness. This bill was a precursor to the Boundary Waters Canoe Area Wilderness Act which was signed into law by President Jimmy Carter on October 21, 1978. The act increased the size of the wilderness area by 50,000 acres (20,000 ha; 78 sq mi) and created the 1,098,057 acres (444,368 ha; 1,715.714 sq mi) wilderness in Northern Minnesota.

The Boundary Waters Canoe Area Wilderness Act (Public Law 95-495) was contested in court from 1978 to 1982 by the National Association of Property Owners, The State of Minnesota, and other property owners within the wilderness area.

The Friends of the Boundary Waters Wilderness joined with Audubon of Duluth, Izaak Walton League, League of Women Voters, MECCA, Minnesota Rovers, Minnesota Ornithologists Union, Wilderness Society, Wilderness Inquiry, and the Sierra Club in favor of the wilderness designation.

The ruling was eventually upheld and declared constitutional by the Supreme Court by a decision of 8 to 1 on March 8, 1982.

=== Acid Rain Awareness ===
In November 1979 the Friends of the Boundary Waters Wilderness co-sponsored the world's first International Acid Rain Conference in Toronto, Ontario. This conference was the first of its kind and brought awareness to the detrimental effects of mercury pollution, mercury in fish, and acidification of the lakes and rivers of the United States.

The Friends sponsored a local conference in February 1980 in Minneapolis, Minnesota, and this influenced the State of Minnesota to study the effects of acid rain. In 1982 The State of Minnesota passed the Acid Deposition Control Act which represented the world's most stringent acid rain laws. This act recognized that acid rain and mercury pollution posed a major threat to the Boundary Waters and the extremely fragile ecosystem which is represents. In 1986, Minnesota become the only state to set a specific standard to protect its sensitive aquatic ecosystems at about 10 lbs/acre of sulfate thanks in part to the efforts of the Friends of the Boundary Waters Wilderness. In 1990 the federal government set their standards for acid deposition, four years behind the State of Minnesota.

=== Past Issues ===
In 1988 the Friends filed a Lawsuit over the Minnesota Air National Guard's flights above the BWCAW. Sonic booms and jet noise had the potential to disrupt wildlife and threaten the wilderness character of the area. The Minnesota Air National Guard eventually settled in November 1989 and the flight area's northern boundary was redrawn. This was the first time in history that the military had changed a flight path due to a wilderness area and set a precedent for other wilderness areas around the country.

The Friends have fought an ongoing issue to close the motor portages between Vermillion & Trout Lake and the portage between Moose & Basswood lakes. These motor portages, under the 1964 Wilderness Act, are mechanical in nature and have no place in a wilderness area. The portages are still operating and the issue is unresolved.

The Friends filed a lawsuit on June 22, 2010, against AT&T to stop construction of a 450-foot telecommunications tower 15 miles east of Ely on the Fernberg Road. The tower would be lit at night and visible within the wilderness area, compromising the wilderness character of the area. The Friends case argued that the construction of an unlit 199-foot tower would serve residents of the area equally well, without intruding on the wilderness. In April 2011, the Friends, represented by a pro bono legal team from Robins Kaplan Miller & Ciresi, argued in Hennepin County District Court and in August the court ruled in favor of the Friends under the Minnesota Environmental Rights Act. AT&T appealed that decision, and the Minnesota Court of Appeals overturned the District Court in June 2012. The Minnesota Supreme Court declined to hear the case on appeal, and construction of the tower was completed in 2013. In response, the Friends announced that they would remain vigilant against other visual intrusions on the wilderness, and work with local governments to prevent similar towers from being constructed.

=== Current Issues ===
Proposed copper-nickel mines near the BWCAW have the potential to pollute the waters and watershed of the Boundary Waters. Mining Truth, a coalition of the Friends, Conservation Minnesota, and the Minnesota Center for Environmental Advocacy, was formed in 2012 to raise awareness of the risks of copper-nickel mining proposals. In September 2013, Mining Truth announced that they had delivered over 12,000 petitions to Minnesota Governor Mark Dayton, asking him to require yes answers to four questions before permitting any copper-nickel mine. In March 2014, The Friends of the Boundary Waters filed comments critical of the supplemental draft Environmental Impact Statement of the PolyMet mine proposal with the Minnesota Department of Natural Resources. Additionally, Mining Truth organized thousands of public comments concerned about the environmental impact of the mine plan.

Logging and mining proposals in forest management plans have the potential to affect the wilderness area. The Friends analyze and review proposals and advocate for the highest level of protection of the Boundary Waters.

The Friends continue to work for clean air legislation to protect the sensitive Superior-Quetico ecosystem and eliminate haze created by coal-fired power plants.

== Papers ==
Papers relating to the Friends of the Boundary Waters Wilderness are available for research use. They include files and papers of Miron (Bud) Heinselman of St. Paul, a U.S. Forest Service ecologist who was active in the environmental movement and was an expert on the ecology of the Boundary Waters Canoe Area Wilderness of northern Minnesota. The collection consists primarily of Heinselman's records of the Friends of the Boundary Waters Wilderness and includes newspaper clippings, research files, teaching materials, correspondence, news releases, studies and reports, legal files, articles, speeches, newsletters, fact sheets, maps, legislative files, drafts of bills, photographs, and scrapbooks.

== See also ==
- Superior National Forest
- Sulfide mining
