= Bush butternut tree =

Bush butternut
- Species: Butternut (Juglans cinerea)
- Location: Tumwater, Washington, United States
- Coordinates: 46°58′05″N 122°52′55″W
- Date seeded: 1845 (planted)
- Custodian: Ray Gleason (arborist)
- Website: bushprairiefarm.com

The Bush butternut tree was a butternut tree in Tumwater, Washington, planted in 1845 by George Bush, an African-American veteran of the War of 1812 who became a pioneer of the Puget Sound region and founder of the city of Tumwater. The tree was thought to be the oldest butternut in the United States and possibly the oldest in the world. Historians are divided on whether Bush brought a seed or seedling with him from Missouri in the United States to the Puget Sound area, then in Oregon Country.

The original tree stood on Bush's homestead, now Bush Prairie Farm and a land trust, near Olympia Airport. It was seriously damaged in a windstorm in 2015, and collapsed on May 1, 2021, at the age of 176 years.

In 2009, a tree grown from a seed of the original tree was planted on the Washington State Capitol campus in Olympia, Washington. Another was planted at Washington State University in Eastern Washington in 2014. Another was planted in Centralia, Washington, in 2017, commemorating its founder George Washington, another African-American settler, and his namesake President George Washington.
