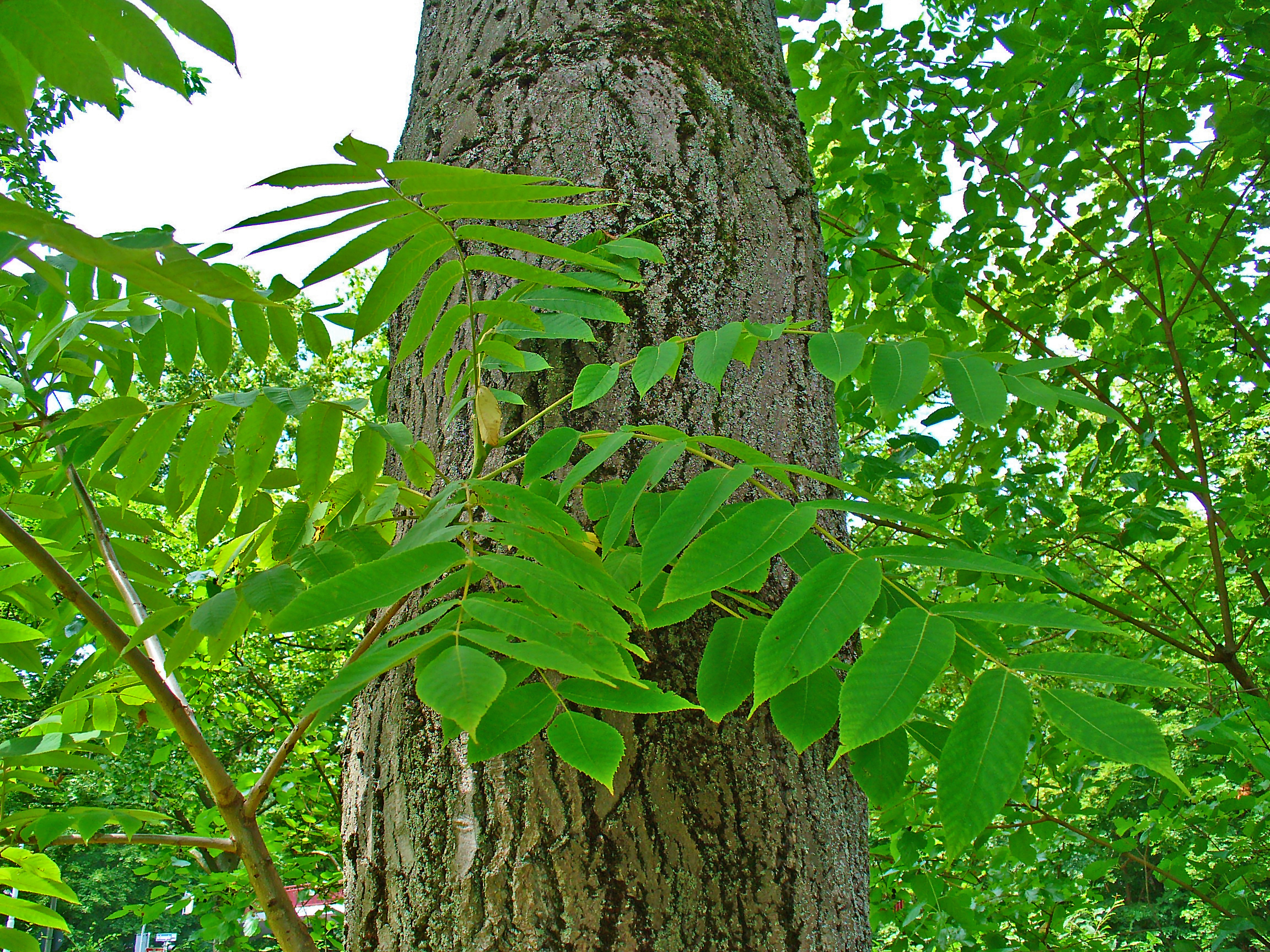
- A mature butternut tree

Conservation status
- Endangered (IUCN 3.1)

- Vulnerable (NatureServe)

Scientific classification
- Kingdom: Plantae
- Clade: Tracheophytes
- Clade: Angiosperms
- Clade: Eudicots
- Clade: Rosids
- Order: Fagales
- Family: Juglandaceae
- Genus: Juglans
- Section: Juglans sect. Trachycaryon
- Species: J. cinerea

Binomial name
- Juglans cinerea L. 1759
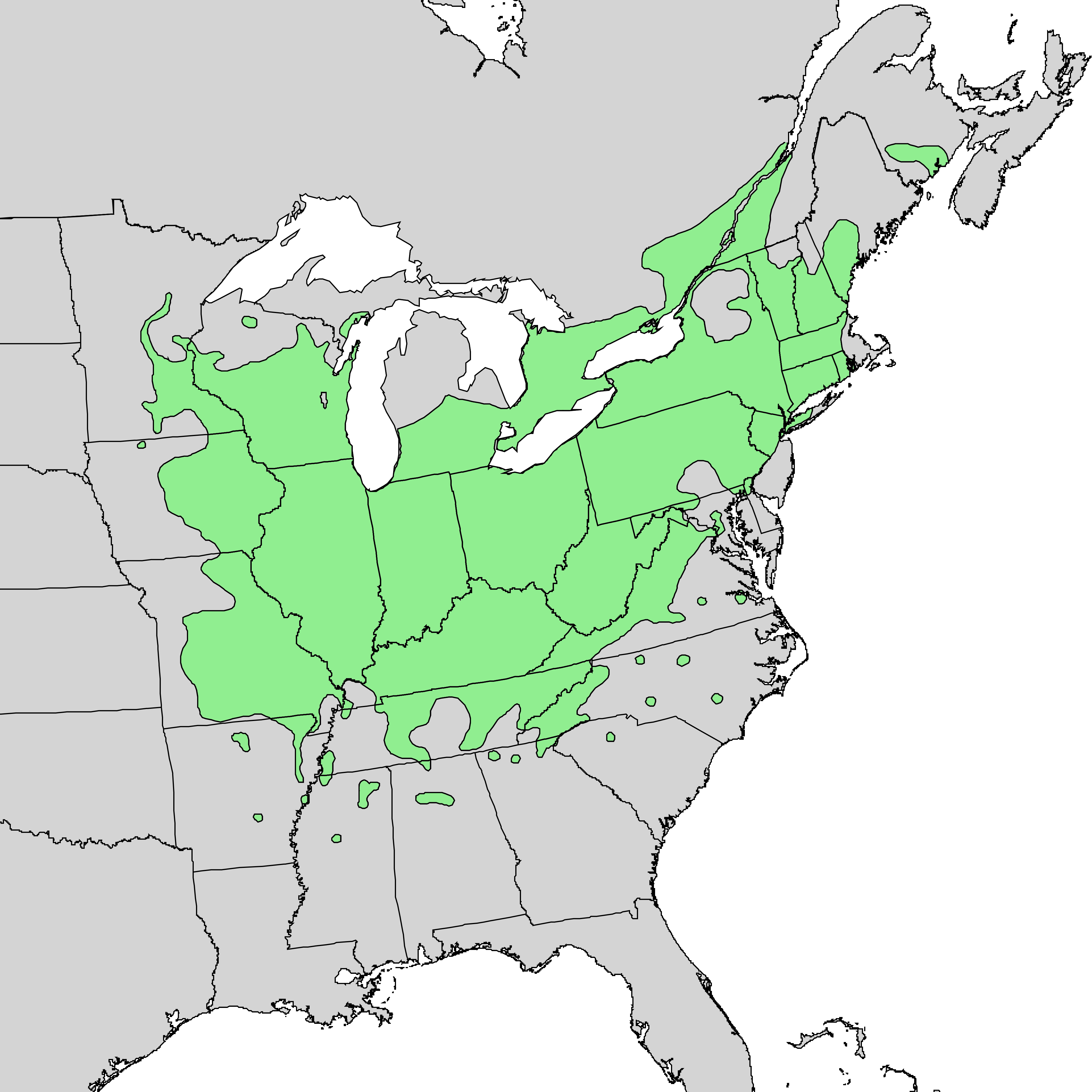
- Natural range

Synonyms
- Nux cinerea (L.) M.Gómez; Wallia cinerea (L.) Alef.

= Juglans cinerea =

Butternut

Species of tree

Juglans cinerea, commonly known as butternut or white walnut, is a species of walnut native to the eastern United States and southeast Canada.

== Description ==
J. cinerea is a deciduous tree growing to 30 metres (98 ft) tall, rarely more. Butternut is a slow-growing species, and rarely lives longer than 75 years. It has a 40–80 cm (16–31 in) stem diameter, with light gray bark.

The leaves are alternate and pinnate, 40–70 cm (16–28 in) long, with 11–17 leaflets, each leaflet 5–10 cm (2–4 in) long and 3–5 cm (1 1/4–2 in) broad. Leaves have a terminal leaflet at the end of the leafstalk and have an odd number of leaflets. The whole leaf is downy-pubescent, and a somewhat brighter, yellower green than many other tree leaves.

=== Flowering and fruiting ===
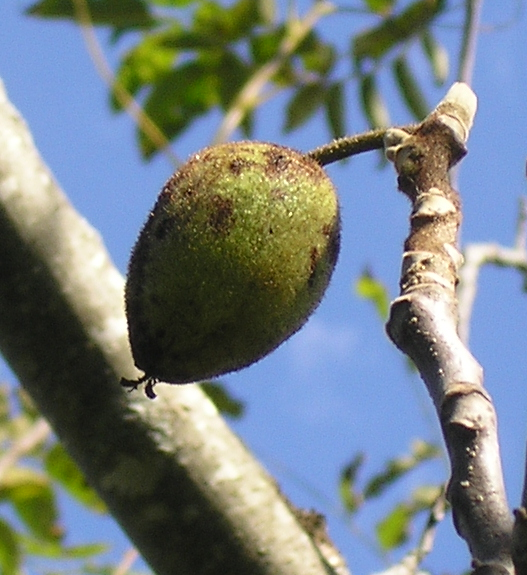
A butternut

Like other members of the family Juglandaceae, butternut's leafout in spring is tied to photoperiod rather than air temperature and occurs when daylight length reaches 14 hours. This can vary by up to a month in the northern and southernmost extents of its range. Leaf drop in fall is early and is initiated when daylight drops to 11 hours. The species is monoecious. Male (staminate) flowers are inconspicuous, yellow-green slender catkins that develop from axillary buds and female (pistillate) flowers are short terminal spikes on current year's shoots. Each female flower has a light pink stigma. The flowers of both sexes typically do not mature at the same time on an individual tree.

The fruit is a lemon-shaped nut, produced in bunches of two to six together; the nut is oblong-ovoid, 3–6 cm (1 1/4–2 1/4 in) long and 2–4 cm (3/4–1 1/2 in) broad, surrounded by a green husk before maturity in midautumn. Rodents such as squirrels help distribute the seeds.

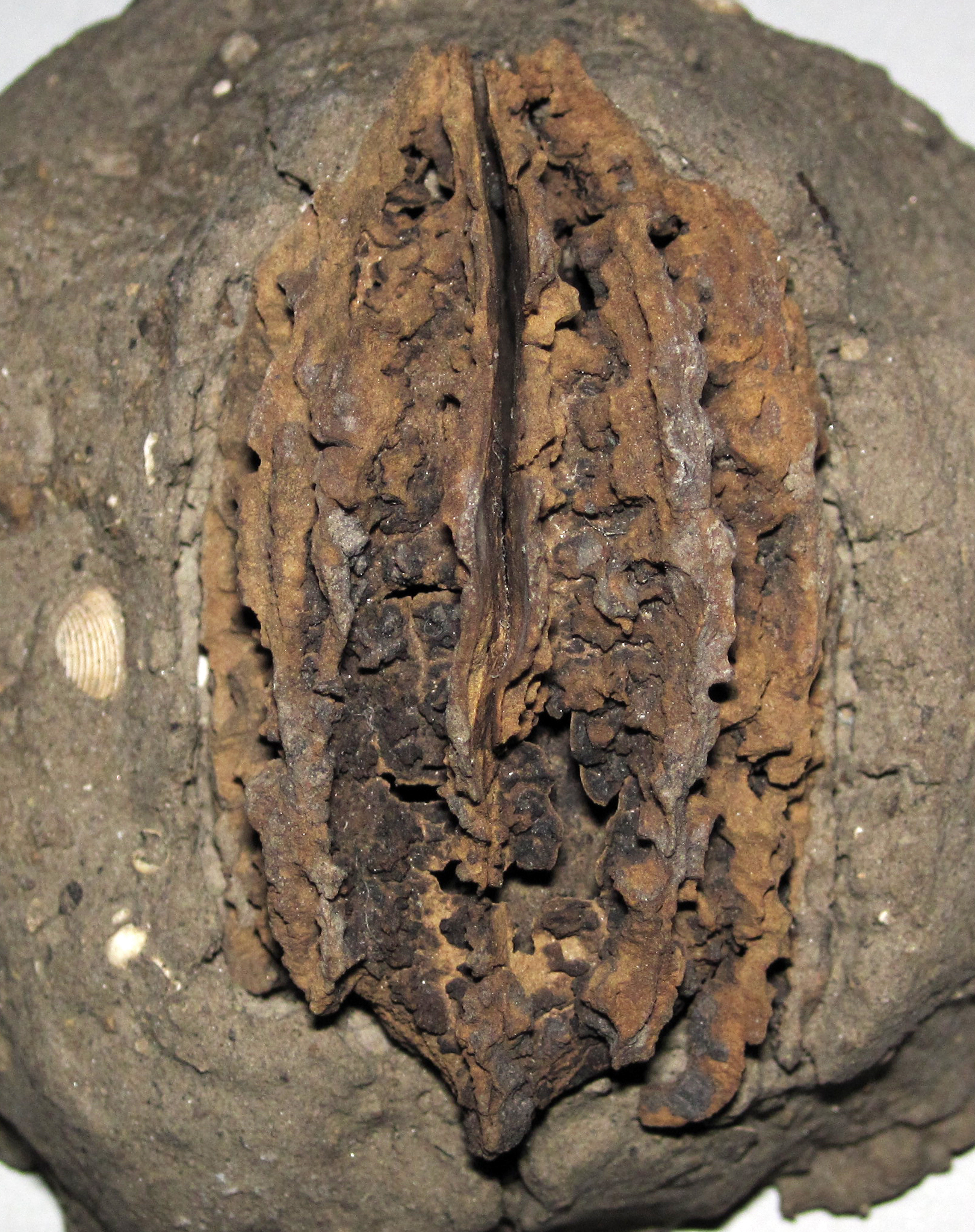
Fossilized Juglans cinerea (fossil white walnut) in Pleistocene glacial sediments, Michigan

== Distribution and habitat ==
The distribution range of J. cinerea extends east to New Brunswick, and from southern Quebec west to Minnesota, south to northern Alabama and southwest to northern Arkansas. It is absent from most of the Southern United States. The species also proliferates at middle elevations (about 610 m or 2,000 ft above sea level) in the Columbia River basin/Pacific Northwest, as an off-site species. Trees with 2.1 m or 7 ft (over mature) class range diameter at breast height were noted in the Imnaha River drainage as late as January 26, 2015. Butternut favors a cooler climate than black walnut and its range does not extend into the Deep South. Its northern range extends into Wisconsin and Minnesota where the growing season is too short for black walnut.

== Ecology ==
=== Soil and topography ===
Butternut grows best on stream banks and on well-drained soils. It is seldom found on dry, compact, or infertile soils. It grows better than black walnut, however, on dry, rocky soils, especially those of limestone origin. Butternut's range includes the rocky soils of New England where black walnut is largely absent.

Butternut is found most frequently in coves, on stream benches and terraces, on slopes, in the talus of rock ledges, and on other sites with good drainage. It is found up to an elevation of 1,500 m (4,900 ft) in the Virginias – much higher than black walnut. The nuts are eaten by wildlife.

=== Associated forest cover ===
Butternut is found with many other tree species in several hardwood types in the mixed mesophytic forest. It is an associated species in the following four northern and central forest cover types: sugar maple–basswood, yellow poplar–white oak–northern red oak, beech–sugar maple, and river birch–sycamore. Commonly associated trees include basswood (Tilia spp.), black cherry (Prunus serotina), beech (Fagus grandifolia), black walnut (Juglans nigra), elm (Ulmus spp.), hemlock (Tsuga canadensis), hickory (Carya spp.), oak (Quercus spp.), red maple (Acer rubrum), sugar maple (Acer saccharum), yellow poplar (Liriodendron tulipifera), white ash (Fraxinus americana), and yellow birch (Betula alleghaniensis). In the northeast part of its range, it is often found with sweet birch (Betula lenta) and in the northern part of its range it is occasionally found with white pine (Pinus strobus). Forest stands seldom contain more than an occasional butternut tree, although in local areas, it may be abundant. In the past, West Virginia, Wisconsin, Indiana, and Tennessee have been the leading producers of butternut timber.

==== Canopy competition ====
Although young trees may withstand competition from the side, butternut does not survive under shade from above. It must be in the overstory to thrive. Therefore, it is classed as intolerant of shade and competition.

=== Diseases ===
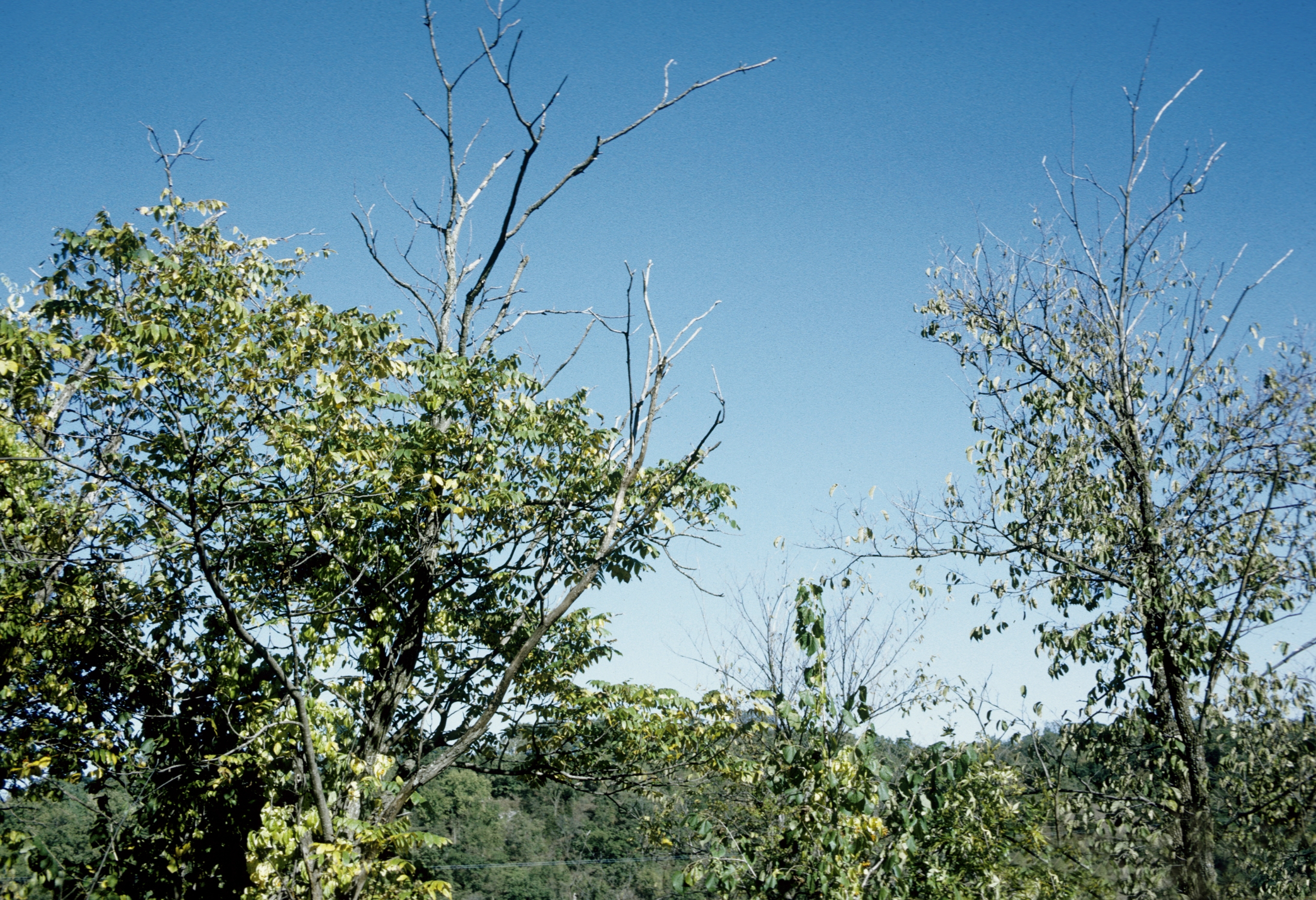
Butternuts killed by butternut canker

==== Butternut canker ====
The most serious disease of J. cinerea is butternut decline or butternut canker. In the past, the causal organism of this disease was thought to be a fungus, Melanconis juglandis. Now this fungus has been associated with secondary infections and the primary causal organism of the disease has been identified as another species of fungus, Ophiognomonia clavigignenti-juglandacearum. The fungus is spread by wide-ranging vectors, so isolation of a tree offers no protection.

Butternut canker first entered the U.S. around the beginning of the 20th century, when it arrived on imported nursery stock of Japanese walnut.

Symptoms of the disease include dying branches and stems. Initially, cankers develop on branches in the lower crown. Spores developing on these dying branches are spread by rainwater to tree stems. Stem cankers develop 1 to 3 years after branches die. Tree tops killed by stem-girdling cankers do not resprout. Diseased trees usually die within several years. Completely free-standing trees seem better able to withstand the fungus than those growing in dense stands or forest. In some areas, 90% of the butternut trees have been killed. The disease is reported to be spreading rapidly in Wisconsin. By contrast, black walnut seems to be resistant to the disease.

==== Hybrid resistance ====
Butternut hybridizes readily with Japanese walnut. The hybrid between butternut and the Japanese walnut is commonly known as the 'buartnut' and inherits Japanese walnut's resistance to the disease. Researchers are back-crossing butternut to buartnut, creating 'butter-buarts" which should have more butternut traits than buartnuts. They are selecting for resistance to the disease. In some areas, most butternuts found as landscaping trees may be buartnuts rather than the pure species.

==== Other pests ====
Bunch disease also attacks butternut. Currently, the causal agent is thought to be a mycoplasma-like organism. Symptoms include a yellow witches' broom resulting from sprouting and growth of auxiliary buds that would normally remain dormant. Infected branches fail to become dormant in the fall and are killed by frost; highly susceptible trees may eventually be killed. Butternut seems to be more susceptible to this disease than black walnut.

The common grackle has been reported to destroy immature fruit and may be considered a butternut pest when populations are high.

Butternut is very susceptible to fire damage, and although the species is generally wind-firm, it is subject to frequent storm damage.

== Conservation ==
The species is not listed as threatened federally in the US, but is listed as rare (S3, meaning there are 21-100 individuals) in Tennessee, "Special Concern" in Kentucky, "Exploitably Vulnerable" in New York State, and "Endangered" in Illinois and Minnesota.

The Committee on the Status of Endangered Wildlife in Canada placed the butternut on the endangered species list in Canada in 2005.

Approximately 60 grafted butternut trees were planted in a seed orchard in Huntingburg, Indiana, in 2012 as part of a larger effort by the USDA Forest Service to conserve the species and to breed resistance to butternut canker disease. Forest Service staff from the Hoosier National Forest, the Eastern Region National Forest genetics program, the Northern Research Station, and the Hardwood Tree Improvement and Regeneration Center at Purdue University are involved in the project.

Butternuts (Juglans cinerea), dried
Nutritional value per 100 g (3.5 oz)
- Energy: 2,560 kJ (610 kcal)
- Carbohydrates: 12 g
- Dietary fiber: 4.7 g
- Fat: 57 g
- Saturated: 1.31 g
- Monounsaturated: 10.4 g
- Polyunsaturated omega−3 omega−6: 42.7 g 8.72 g 33.7 g
- Protein: 24.9 g
Amino acids
Tryptophan	0.366 g
Threonine	0.94 g
Isoleucine	1.18 g
Leucine	2.2 g
Lysine	0.77 g
Methionine	0.611 g
Cystine	0.484 g
Phenylalanine	1.44 g
Tyrosine	0.977 g
Valine	1.54 g
Arginine	4.86 g
Histidine	0.808 g
Alanine	1.37 g
Aspartic acid	3.1 g
Glutamic acid	6.08 g
Glycine	1.51 g
Proline	1.24 g
Serine	1.64 g
Vitamins and minerals
Vitamins	Quantity %DV^{†}
Vitamin A	124 IU
Thiamine (B1)	32% 0.383 mg
Riboflavin (B2)	11% 0.148 mg
Niacin (B3)	7% 1.04 mg
Pantothenic acid (B5)	13% 0.633 mg
Vitamin B6	33% 0.56 mg
Folate (B9)	17% 66 μg
Vitamin C	4% 3.2 mg
Minerals	Quantity %DV^{†}
Calcium	4% 53 mg
Copper	50% 0.45 mg
Iron	22% 4.02 mg
Magnesium	56% 237 mg
Manganese	285% 6.56 mg
Phosphorus	36% 446 mg
Potassium	14% 421 mg
Selenium	31% 17.2 μg
Sodium	0% 1 mg
Zinc	28% 3.13 mg
- Other constituents: Quantity
- Water: 3.34 g
- Link to USDA Database entry
- ^{†}Percentages estimated using US recommendations for adults, except for potassium, which is estimated based on expert recommendation from the National Academies.

== Uses ==
=== Culinary uses ===
The butternuts are edible and were made into a butter-like oil by Native Americans for various purposes. The young green nuts, while still soft, can be pickled; survivalist Bradford Angier recommends this be done with a change of salt water every other day for a week, and a subsequent seasoning of at least two weeks. The sap can be used to make syrup.

=== Lumber ===
Butternut wood is light in weight and takes polish well, and is highly rot-resistant, but is much softer than black walnut wood. Oiled, the grain of the wood usually shows much light. It is often used to make furniture, and is a favorite of woodcarvers.

=== Fabric dye ===
Butternut bark and nut rinds were once often used to dye cloth to colors between light yellow and dark brown. The husks contain a natural yellow-orange dye. To produce the darker colors, the bark is boiled to concentrate the color. This appears to never have been used as a commercial dye, but rather was used to color homespun cloth.

In the mid-19th century, inhabitants of areas such as southern Illinois and southern Indiana – many of whom had moved there from the Southern U.S. – were known as "butternuts" from the butternut-dyed homespun cloth that some of them wore. Later, during the American Civil War, the term "butternut" was sometimes applied to Confederate soldiers. Some Confederate uniforms apparently faded from gray to a tan or light brown. It is also possible that butternut was used to color the cloth worn by a small number of Confederate soldiers. The resemblance of these uniforms to butternut-dyed clothing, and the association of butternut dye with home-made clothing, resulted in the derisive nickname.

=== Fishing ===
Crushed fruits can be used to poison fish, though the practice is illegal in most jurisdictions. Bruised fruit husks of the closely related black walnut can be used to stun fish.

== Famous specimens ==
The American Forest National Champion is located in Oneida, New York. In 2016 its circumference at breast height was 24 ft (7.3 m), the height was 67 ft (20 m), and the spread was 88 ft (27 m).

The Bush butternut tree was planted by settler George Bush (1845) in current Tumwater, Washington, brought from Missouri. It was seriously damaged in a windstorm in 2015, and collapsed on May 1, 2021, at the age of 176 years.

Butternut wood has been found at the pre-Columbian Viking settlement at L'Anse aux Meadows at the northernmost tip of Newfoundland, an island where butternut does not grow and to which it therefore is presumed to have been transported from more southerly locations. The butternut log specimens found there were cut with European tools.
