= Sea Gull Lake =

Lake in the state of Minnesota, United States

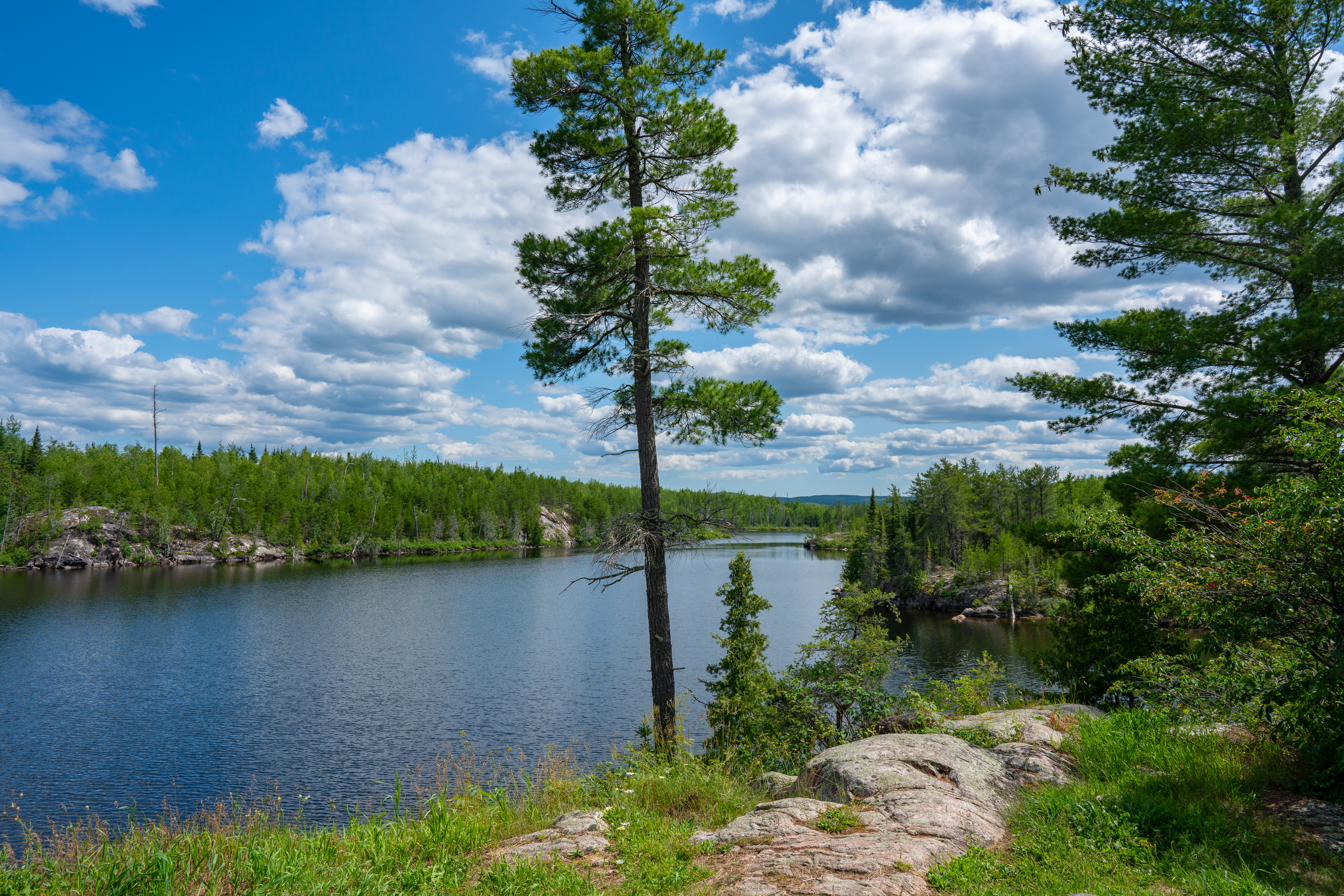

- Location within Minnesota
- Location: Cook County, Minnesota
- Coordinates: 48°8′N 90°57′W
- Type: lake

Sea Gull Lake is a lake in Cook County, Minnesota, in the United States.

Sea Gull Lake is an English translation of the Ojibwe-language name; it was so named for the abundance of seagulls.

== See also ==
- List of lakes in Minnesota
