= Bradford Angier =

American survivalist and author

- Born: 13 May 1910
- Died: 3 March 1997 (aged 86)
- Occupations: Writer, Survivalist

Bradford Angier (May 13, 1910 – March 3, 1997) was an American wilderness survivalist and proponent of back-to-earth living. He authored more than 35 books on how to survive in the wild and how to live off the land according to minimalist precepts.

In 1947 Angier and his new wife, Vena (Elvena, 1914–2011), were living in Boston, Massachusetts. They had long romanticized the life of Henry David Thoreau and decided to move to Hudson's Hope, a small town in northeastern British Columbia, Canada, to live off the land. Once there, they found an old prospector's cabin. With the few tools and how-to books they brought with them, they were able to repair the cabin. Bradford Angier then set about learning to hunt and gather wild food.

He eventually started writing survival books. Vena Angier was artistic and hand-illustrated several of his books. The couple lived in Canada until the building of the W.A.C. Bennett Dam during the 1960s on the Peace River near their home forced them to move. They moved to Cambria, California, and built a house that was less than 1,000 square feet (93 m^{2}). For decades Bradford Angier and Calvin Rutstrum were the two most prominent "how to" authors on living in the wilderness.

In the 1970s the Angiers returned to Hudson's Hope. In 1972 Bradford wrote the book One Acre & Security in which he discussed how to live organically on only 1-acre (4,000 m^{2}) of land. At this time he had become popular with the back-to-earth movement and was sought out by many people wishing to emulate his lifestyle. He was sometimes referred to as "Mr. Outdoors"

Bradford Angier died in 1997, a few months short of his 50th wedding anniversary.

== Bibliography ==
- At Home in the Woods: Living the Life of Thoreau Today (1951)
- How To Build Your Home in The Woods (1952)
- Living Off the Country: How to Stay Alive in the Woods (1956)
- On Your Own in the Wilderness (1958)
- Wilderness Cookery (1961)
- We Like It Wild (1963)
- Home in Your Pack: The Modern Handbook of Backpacking (1965)
- Free for the Eating (1966)
- Free for the Eating (100 Wild Plants, 300 Ways to Use Them) (1967)
- Home in Your Pack: The Modern Handbook of Backpacking (1967)
- Skills for Taming the Wilds: A Handbook of Woodcraft Wisdom (1967)
- The Ghosts of Spirit River (1968)
- The Outdoorsman's Emergency Manual: Being Your Own Wilderness Doctor (1968)
- Being Your Own Wilderness Doctor: The outdoorsman's emergency manual (1984)
- How to Stay Alive in the Woods: A Complete Guide to Food, Shelter and Self-Preservation That Makes Starvation in the Wilderness Next to the Impossible: Originally Published As Living Off the Country (1969)
- More Free-for-the-Eating Wild Foods (1969)
- A Star to the North (1970)
- The Art and Science of Taking to the Woods (1970)
- Gourmet Cooking For Free (1970)
- Wilderness Cookery: Complete Outdoor Meals (1970)
- How to Live in the Woods on Pennies a Day (1971)
- One Acre and Security How to Live Off the Earth Without Ruining it (1972)
- Skills for Taming the Wilds: A Handbook of Woodcraft Wisdom (1972)
- Survival with Style (1972)
- Wilderness Gear You Can Make Yourself (1973)
- Field Guide to Edible Wild Plants (1974)
- The Freighter Travel Manual (1974)
- Home Book of Cooking Venison and Other Natural Meats (1975)
- Looking for Gold: The Modern Prospector's Handbook (Prospecting and Treasure Hunting) (1975)
- Color Field Guide to Common Wild Edibles (1976)
- Wilderness Wife (1976)
- Field Guide to Medicinal Wild Plants (1978)
- The Master Backwoodsman: Wilderness Skills and Campcraft for Ventures off the Beaten Path (1978)
- Home Cookbook of Wild Meat and Game (1982)
- Bradford Angier's Backcountry Basics: Wilderness Skills and Outdoor Know-How (1983)
- Camping-on-the-go Cookery (1983)
- The Competence Factor: Skills That Make the Difference in Outdoor Sports (1983)
- At Home in the Desert: Surviving and Thriving for a Day, a Week, or a Lifetime (1984)
