= Fall Lake (Minnesota) =

Lake in the state of Minnesota, United States

- Location within Minnesota
- Location: Minnesota
- Coordinates: 47°56.5′N 91°45′W
- Type: lake

Fall Lake is a lake in the U.S. state of Minnesota.

Fall Lake was named for a waterfall on the short stream connecting Fall Lake with Garden Lake.

== See also ==
- List of lakes in Minnesota
