= Wilderness Act =

American federal law

- Long title: An Act to establish a National Wilderness Preservation System for the permanent good of the whole people, and for other purposes.
- Nicknames: Wilderness Act of 1964
- Enacted by: the 88th United States Congress

Citations
- Public law: 88–577
- Statutes at Large: 78 Stat. 890

Codification
- Titles amended: 16 U.S.C.: Conservation
- U.S.C. sections created: 16 U.S.C. ch. 23 § 1131 et seq.

Legislative history
- Introduced in the Senate as S. 4; Passed the Senate on April 9, 1963 (73-12); Passed the House on July 30, 1964 (374-1, in lieu of H.R. 9070); Signed into law by President Lyndon B. Johnson on September 3, 1964

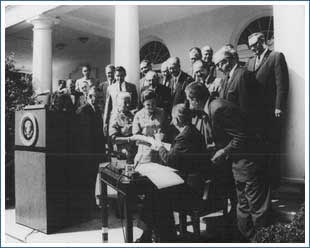
President Lyndon Johnson signs the Wilderness Act of 1964 in the White House Rose Garden. Also pictured are Interior Secretary Stewart Udall, Senator Frank Church, Mardy Murie, Alice Zahniser, and Representative Wayne Aspinall, among others.

The Wilderness Act of 1964 (Pub. L. 88–577) is a federal land management statute meant to protect federal wilderness and to create a formal mechanism for designating wilderness. It was written by Howard Zahniser of The Wilderness Society. After over sixty drafts and eight years of work, President Lyndon B. Johnson signed the Wilderness Act into law on September 3, 1964, creating the legal definition of wilderness in the United States and protecting 9.1 million acres (37,000 km²) of federal land.

The Wilderness Act is well known for its succinct and poetic definition of wilderness:

"A wilderness, in contrast with those areas where man and his own works dominate the landscape, is hereby recognized as an area where the earth and its community of life are untrammeled by man, where man himself is a visitor who does not remain." – Howard Zahniser

When Congress passed and President Lyndon B. Johnson signed the Wilderness Act on September 3, 1964, it created the National Wilderness Preservation System. The initial statutory wilderness areas, designated in the Act, comprised 9.1 million acres (37,000 km²) of national forest wilderness areas in the United States of America previously protected by administrative orders. The current amount of areas designated by the NWPS as wilderness totals 757 areas encompassing 109.5 million acres of federally owned land in 44 states and Puerto Rico (5% of the land in the United States).

== Background ==
Throughout the 1950s and 1960s, there were growing concerns about the rapidly growing population in America after World War II, a period known as a baby boom. Additionally, American transportation systems grew in size which made transportation easier and increased environmental concerns. A leading concern was that environmental degradation would have an impact on air and water quality, this was partly addressed by the initial passage of the Clean Air Act in 1963.

The problem of American wilderness still persisted even after attempts to regulate pollutants. Part of America's identity was the vast untamed wilderness that was untouched by humans, which had fallen to about 2.5% of the total land in America by the 1960s. Previous efforts to conserve nature had yielded public land designations and protections such as the National Parks System, National Forests, and primitive areas. Unfortunately, many of these designations came short of providing the necessary protections needed to keep the land preserved for future generations. The shortcomings of previous protections were exclaimed by efforts to develop protected lands for mining and energy utilization, a prominent example is the Echo Park Dam controversy at Dinosaur National Monument.The encroachment on existing protected land motivated conservationists to lobby Congress to add additional protections to wilderness land, in particular, Howard Zahniser wrote the first draft of the Wilderness Act.

== Legislative history ==
The Wilderness Act of 1964 went through numerous discussions and drafts before finally being enacted during the 88th Congress.

=== Before the 88th Congress ===
The concept of developing a Federal Wilderness system through Congress began to be seriously explored in 1948 when a group of Congressional members requested a report be compiled on the topic through the Legislative Reference Service within the Library of Congress. The report was completed a year later, and the results released the data that had been requested which provided more information on the current state of federal land. In 1956, about seven years later, the first committee hearings began in House and Senate on the topic of protecting Wildlife Refuge areas. The first drafts of the Wilderness Act were introduced in the House in January 1957, where 6 bills were introduced over a span of four days. One month later, the Senate also introduced a draft bill of the Wilderness Act.

President John F. Kennedy, was a supporter of the Wilderness Act, his administration worked to rally Legislators to pass the bill. During the 87th Congressional session, the Senate voted and passed a version of the Wilderness Act, however it never made it to a vote in the House and its overall fate was regarded as uncertain at the time.

=== The 88th Congress ===
Early in the 88th Congressional term, the Senate debated and eventually passed the Wilderness Bill in April 1963. After President Kennedy's assassination, President Lyndon B Johnson continued the executive efforts for the Wilderness Act to be passed. During a press conference on June 23, 1963, President Johnson included the Wilderness Act as a piece of legislation that needed to be passed in his list of 30 "musts." After going to a conference committee to resolve differences between the House and Senate versions of the bill, the Act was eventually signed into law by President Johnson on September 3, 1964.

=== Establishment and Impact ===
The Wilderness Act of 1964 was significant in American environmental legislation, setting a start for the federal protection of wilderness areas across the United States. It was passed with the support in both the Senate (73–12) and the House of Representatives (373–1), showing bipartisan agreement on the importance of preserving natural landscapes for future generations. This act established the National Wilderness Preservation System, defining wilderness as areas, according to Wilderness Society president Howard Zahniser, "where the earth and its community of life are untrammeled by man." It also stopped most forms of development and motorized vehicles in these areas. The success of the Wilderness Act had a lot to do with the groups who supported it. These groups included not only environmental organizations like the Wilderness Society and the Sierra Club but also labor and civic groups, showing great public interest in preserving America's wilderness.

== Legal framework ==
The Wilderness Act of 1964 included a few provisions (sections), that covered different aspects its implementation.

=== Definition of a Wilderness ===
Section 2 of the Wilderness Act provides a justification for and definition of what constitutes an area of land as wilderness.

Wilderness Act land is chosen from existing federal land and by determining which areas are considered to meet the following criteria:

- Minimal human imprint
- Opportunities for unconfined recreation
- At least five thousand acres
- Educational, scientific, scenic or historical value
- Have no commercial enterprises within them or any motorized travel or other form of mechanical transport (e.g., vehicles, motorcycles, bicycles).

=== Creation of the National Wilderness Preservation System ===
Section 3 of the Act outlines the creation and regulation of the National Wilderness Preservation System (NWPS).

When Congress designates each wilderness area, it includes a very specific boundary line in statutory law. Once a wilderness area has been added to the system, its protection and boundary can be altered only by Congress. The basics of the NWPS set out in the Wilderness Act are straightforward:

- The lands protected as wilderness are areas of our public lands.
- Wilderness designation is a protective overlay Congress applies to selected portions of national forests, parks, wildlife refuges, and other public lands.
- Within wilderness areas, the Wilderness Act strives to restrain human influences so that ecosystems [the Wilderness Act, however, makes no specific mention of ecosystems] can change over time in their own way, free, as much as possible, from human manipulation. In these areas, as the Wilderness Act puts it, "the earth and its community of life are untrammeled by man", untrammeled meaning that the forces of nature operate unrestrained and unaltered.
- Wilderness areas serve multiple uses but the law limits uses to those consistent with the Wilderness Act mandate that each wilderness area be administered to preserve the "wilderness character of the area". For example, these areas protect watersheds and clean-water supplies vital to downstream municipalities and agriculture, as well as habitats supporting diverse wildlife, including endangered species, but logging and oil and gas drilling are prohibited.
- Along with many other uses for the American people, wilderness areas are popular for diverse kinds of outdoor recreation but without motorized or mechanical vehicles or equipment except where specifically permitted. Scientific research is also allowed in wilderness areas as long as it is non-invasive.
- The Wilderness Act allows certain uses (resource extraction, grazing, etc.) that existed before the land became wilderness to be grandfathered in and so they may continue to take place although the area that was designated as wilderness typically would not concede such uses. Specifically, mining, grazing, water uses, or any other uses that do not significantly impact the majority of the area may remain in some degree.

=== Land use regulations ===
Section 4 lists what usage is not allowed on land protected by the NWPS, and define the exceptions to the rules.

Prohibited actions include:

- Use of a motor vehicle, equipment, motorboat. or any other mechanical transport
- Creation of a permanent or temporary road
- Inclusion of a commercial enterprise
- Aircraft landing

=== Expansion of the program ===
Sections 5, 6, and 7 discuss how Congress shall handle acquisition of more land, gifts, and addition of new designated wilderness areas.

== Uncertainties ==
Some topics surrounding the Act remained unanswered, which has prompted future actions and controversies.

When the Wilderness Act was passed, it ignored lands managed by the Bureau of Land Management because of uncertainty of policy makers surrounding the future of those areas. The uncertainty was clarified in 1976 with the passing of the Federal Land Policy and Management Act, which stated that land managed by the Bureau of Land Management would remain federally owned and, between March 1978 and November 1980, would be reviewed to possibly be classified as wilderness.

Some argue that the criteria to determine wilderness are vague and open to interpretation. For example, one criterion for wilderness is that it be roadless, and the act does not define the term roadless. Wilderness advocacy groups and some agency staff have attempted to use this standard: "the word 'roadless' refers to the absence of roads that have been improved and maintained by mechanical means." For more information, see Revised Statute 2477.

The Wilderness Act has been interpreted by the administrating agencies to ban bicycles from wilderness areas based on the statutory text prohibiting "other mechanical forms of transport". It is noteworthy that mountain bikes did not exist when the Wilderness Act was enacted, hence they were not explicitly identified in the statute. The prohibition on bicycles has led to opposition from mountain bikers to the opening of new wilderness areas.

Because of the Wilderness Act and the growing federal oversight of environmental protection, opposition movements like the Sagebrush rebellion and the Wise use movement emerged, particularly in the American West. These movements represented a shift in the political landscape, fighting against what they saw as federal overreach and advocating for states' rights and individual property rights over public land management. The conflict over wilderness protection and public land management showed the growing division in American environmental politics, showing bigger cultural and ideological divides. This period of environmental opposition not only challenged the principles of federal land management but also contributed to the reorganization of political ideas, playing a role in the evolution of the New Right and the Republican Party's stance on environmental regulations. The Wilderness Act, therefore, not only marked a critical moment in the history of environmental protection but also set the stage for ongoing debates about the role of government in managing natural resources and the balance between conservation and development.

=== Sagebrush Rebellion ===
The 1964 Wilderness Act, which was praised for protecting undisturbed American landscapes, encountered strong resistance from the Sagebrush Rebellion in the latter part of the 1970s. The majority of "resource Westerners" who were affected by federal environmental regulations that limited their access to public lands, such as ranchers, miners, and loggers, were the ones who initiated this backlash. The Federal Land Policy Management Act (FLPMA) of 1976, which changed the Bureau of Land Management's emphasis from resource extraction to conservation, was a major source of dispute because it significantly restricted these groups' ability to make a living. Many in the West were unhappy as a result of this alleged government overreach and saw it as "federal colonialism."

James G. Watt, nominated by President Ronald Reagan as Secretary of the Interior, emerged as a key player in this situation. During his tenure, he worked to extend the scope of mineral rights to include coal and oil, a goal that suited the interests of people impacted by the Wilderness Act and other environmental laws. Watt aimed to reduce federal constraints and give local governments more authority over land management choices. These efforts were perceived as a direct answer to the demands of the Sagebrush Rebellion. Due to regulatory rollbacks which were perceived as a decrease in federal government control over Western lands, the Sagebrush Rebellion temporarily felt victorious due to its alliance with the Reagan administration.

== Creation ==
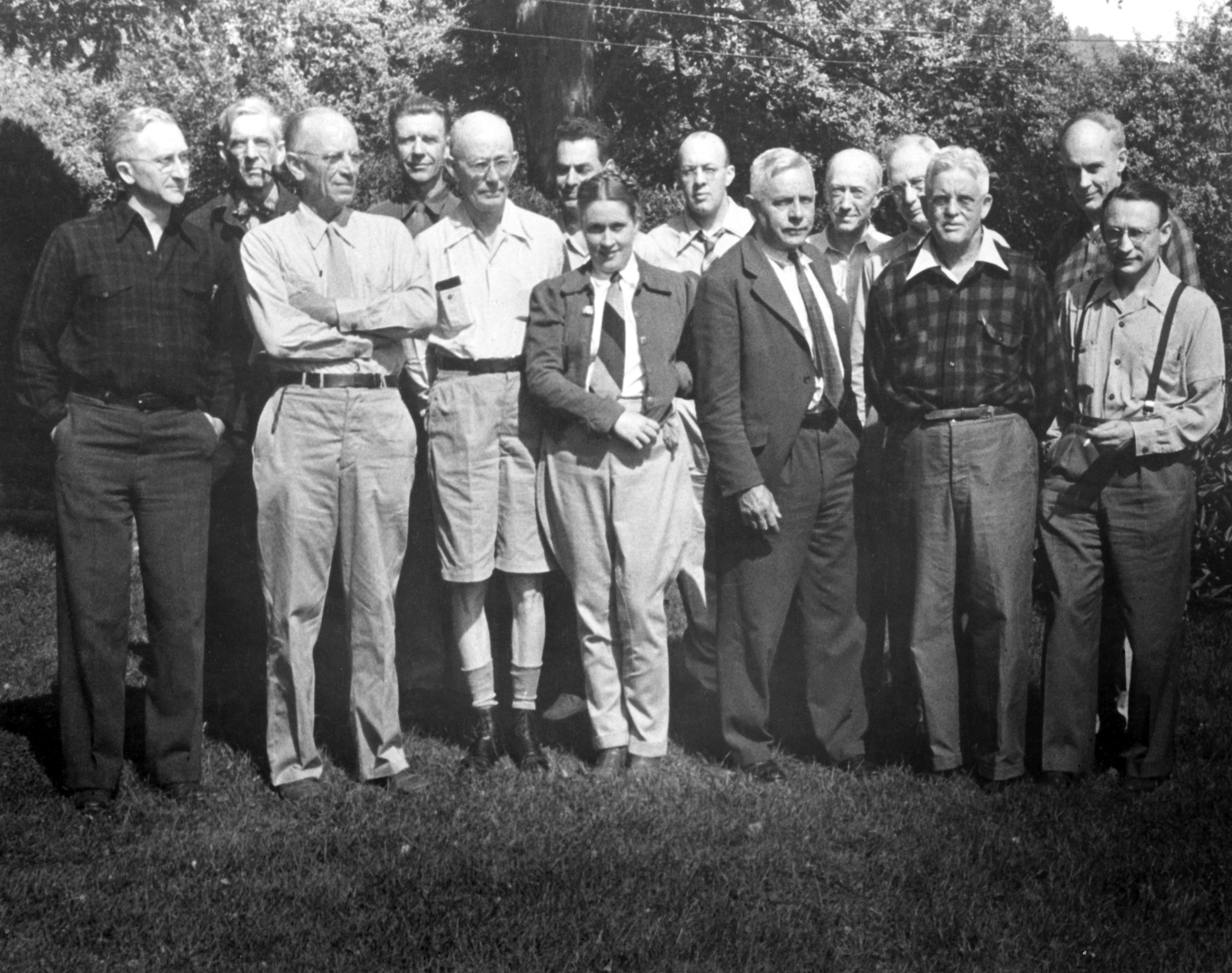
Founding Members, Wilderness Society at Old Rag Mountain, VA in 1946. From left to right: Harvey Broome, Benston MacKaye, Aldo Leopold, Olaus Murie, Irving Clark, George Marshall, Laurette Collier, Howard Zahniser, Ernest Oberholtzer, Harold Anderson, Charles Woodbury, Robert Griggs, Ernest Griffith, and Bernard Frank.

The pioneering research and advocacy work of Margaret and Olaus Murie and Celia Hunter, along with the Alaska Conservation Society, was crucial to the passage of the Wilderness Act, and to the creation of the Arctic National Wildlife Refuge. Margaret Murie testified passionately before Congress in favor of the Wilderness Act. Margaret worked with Wilderness Society staffer Howard Zahniser, author of the bill, to promote passage of the act, and she attended the signing ceremony.

== Statistics ==
As of 2014, the National Wilderness Preservation System comprised over 109 million acres (441,000 km²), involving federal lands administered by four agencies:

The National Wilderness Preservation System: Area Administered by each Federal Agency (September 2014)
Agency	Wilderness area	Agency land designated wilderness
National Park Service	43,932,843 acres (17,778,991 ha)	56%
U.S. Forest Service	36,165,620 acres (14,635,710 ha)	18%
U.S. Fish and Wildlife Service	20,702,488 acres (8,378,000 ha)	22%
Bureau of Land Management	8,710,087 acres (3,524,847 ha)	2%
Total	109,511,038 acres (44,317,545 ha)	100%

== Subsequent legislation ==
The Wilderness Act has created a foundation that allows for many new additions of American land to be designated as wilderness. Congress considers additional proposals every year, some recommended by federal agencies and many proposed by grassroots conservation and sportsmen's organizations. Additional laws adding areas to the NWPS include:

- Eastern Wilderness Areas Act of 1975
- Boundary Waters Canoe Area Wilderness Act of 1978
- Endangered American Wilderness Act of 1978
- Great Bear Wilderness Act of 1978
- Alaska National Interest Lands Conservation Act of 1980
- Central Idaho Wilderness Act of 1980
- National Forest Wilderness Act of 1980
- New Mexico Wilderness Act of 1980
- Vermont Wilderness Act of 1984
- New Hampshire Wilderness Act of 1984
- California Wilderness Act of 1984
- Oregon Wilderness Act of 1984
- Arizona Wilderness Act 1984
- North Carolina Wilderness Act of 1984
- Nevada Wilderness Protection Act of 1989
- Illinois Wilderness Act of 1990
- Los Padres Condor Range and River Protection Act of 1992
- Colorado Wilderness Act of 1993
- California Desert Protection Act of 1994
- Northern California Coastal Wild Heritage Wilderness Act of 2006
- New England Wilderness Act of 2006
- Omnibus Public Land Management Act of 2009
- Sleeping Bear Dunes National Lakeshore Conservation and Recreation Act of 2014
- John D. Dingell Jr. Conservation, Management, and Recreation Act of 2019

Congressional bills are pending to designate new wilderness areas in Utah, Colorado, Washington, California, Virginia, Idaho, West Virginia, Montana and New Hampshire. Grassroots coalitions are working with local congressional delegations on legislative proposals for additional wilderness areas, including Vermont, southern Arizona, national grasslands in South Dakota, Rocky Mountain peaks of Montana, Colorado and Wyoming. The U.S. Forest Service has recommended new wilderness designations, which citizen groups may propose to expand.

== 50th anniversary of Wilderness Act ==
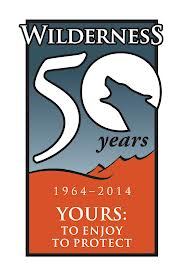
The goal of Wilderness50 is to raise awareness of wilderness during the celebration of its 50th anniversary.

In 2014, America celebrated "50 Years of Wilderness" and Wilderness50 which is a growing coalition of federal agencies, non-profit organizations, academic institutions, and other wilderness user groups has been created to document this historical commemoration honoring America's "True American Legacy of Wilderness".

A series of projects and events were held to commemorate the 50th year of the Wilderness Act, including community museum, airport and visitor center displays; National website and social media campaign; Smithsonian photography exhibition; Washington D.C. Wilderness Week in September, and the National Wilderness Conference.

The Wilderness Act of 1964 is a pivotal legislation governing the preservation and management of wilderness areas in the United States. It provides a framework for Congress to designate federally managed lands as wilderness areas and mandates federal land agencies to manage these areas in a manner consistent with their natural wilderness character. Celebrating its fiftieth anniversary in September 2014, the Act has facilitated the protection of over 109 million acres of public land. The commemorative symposium, "The Wilderness Act at 50," organized by Lewis & Clark Law School, brought together experts to discuss various facets of the Act's evolution and impact.

Notably, discussions delved into the role of litigation in shaping wilderness management, emphasizing strategic decisions by plaintiffs. Moreover, the symposium highlighted the National Environmental Policy Act's (NEPA) significant influence on promoting wilderness designation and constraining agency management practices in wilderness areas. Overall, the Wilderness Act remains a cornerstone of wilderness preservation, subject to ongoing refinement to ensure the enduring protection of these natural treasures.

=== Growth Over the Decades ===
Over the decades, the Wilderness System has grown steadily. By the 50th anniversary in 2014, it encompassed over 109 million acres across 758 areas in 44 states. This expansion has been largely due to the bipartisan support wilderness designations often receive, reflecting a shared value across the political spectrum.

== See also ==
- 1964 in the environment
- List of U.S. Wilderness Areas
- Conservation refugee
- Natural heritage
- National Wilderness Preservation System

== Bibliography ==
- Dant, Sara. "Making Wilderness Work: Frank Church and the American Wilderness Movement." Pacific Historical Review 77 (May 2008): 237-272.
- Doug Scott (August 15, 2004). The Enduring Wilderness: Protecting Our Natural Heritage through the Wilderness Act. Fulcrum Publishing. ISBN 1-55591-527-2.
- Gourlie, Don (2014). "The Wilderness Act at 50". Environmental Law. 44 (2): 285–286. ISSN 0046-2276."Conducting Wilderness Characteristics Inventory on BLM Lands", March 15, 2012
- Holloway, Tiffany (January 16, 2014). "Forest Service to mark 50th anniversary of Wilderness Act". spectrum.[https://web.archive.org/web/20240503145433/https://www.fs.usda.gov/features/forest-service-mark-50th-anniversary-wilderness-act usda.gov].
- Kammer, Sean (2013). "Coming to Terms with Wilderness: The Wilderness Act and the Problem of Wildlife Restoration". Environmental Law. 43 (1): 83–124. ISSN 0046-2276.
- Proescholdt, K. (2008). Untrammeled Wilderness. Minnesota History, 61(3), 114–123. http://www.jstor.org/stable/20188679
- Turner, James Morton (2009-06-01). ""The Specter of Environmentalism": Wilderness, Environmental Politics, and the Evolution of the New Right". The Journal of American History. 96 (1): 123. doi:10.2307/27694734. ISSN 0021-8723.
- James Morton Turner (2012). The Promise of Wilderness: American Environmental Politics since 1964. Seattle: University of Washington Press. ISBN 978-0-295-99175-7.
- Jeffrey O. Durrant (2007). Struggle Over Utah's San Rafael Swell: Wilderness, National Conservation Areas, and National Monuments. Tucson: University of Arizona Press. ISBN 978-0-8165-2669-7.
- "The Wilderness Act of 1964."
- Thompson, Jonathan (2016-01-14). "The first Sagebrush Rebellion: what sparked it and how it ended". High Country News. Retrieved 2024-05-04.
- Watson, Alan; Matt, Roian; Knotek, Katie; Williams, Daniel R.; Yung, Laurie (2011). "Traditional Wisdom: Protecting Relationships with Wilderness as a Cultural Landscape". Ecology and Society. 16 (1). ISSN 1708-3087.
