= Boundary Waters Canoe Area Wilderness Act =

- Long title: An Act to designate the Boundary Waters Canoe Area Wilderness, to establish the Boundary Waters Canoe Area Mining Protection Area, and for other purposes.
- Nicknames: BWCA Wilderness Act
- Enacted by: the 95th United States Congress
- Effective: October 1, 1979

Citations
- Public law: 95-495
- Statutes at Large: 92 Stat. 1649

Codification
- Acts amended: Wilderness Act of 1964

Legislative history
- Passed the House on June 5, 1978; Passed the Senate on October 15, 1978; Signed into law by President Jimmy Carter on October 21, 1978

The Boundary Waters Canoe Area Wilderness Act of 1978 is a U.S. law (Pub.L. 95-495) that protects pristine forests, streams, and lakes in the Superior National Forest. Enactment of the law formally designated the Boundary Waters Canoe Area Wilderness (BWCA), which was previously known as the Boundary Waters Canoe Area. The main purpose of the law is to protect, preserve, and enhance the lakes, waterways and forested areas of the BWCA to enhance public enjoyment of the unique landscape and wildlife. It also establishes some form of management to maintain the area and places restrictions on logging, mining, and the use of motorized vehicles.

A bill to establish a protected wilderness area in the U.S. state of Minnesota at the Boundary Waters was first introduced in 1975 by United States Congressman Jim Oberstar and was a source of major controversy and debate. Topics of major concern were logging, mining, the use of snowmobiles and motorboats. After much debate, and passage by the U.S. House and Senate, the act was signed into law by President Jimmy Carter on October 21, 1978.

== Background ==
=== Selke Committee ===
Serious concerns about destruction of the BWCA began to surface in the spring of 1964 when a group of people from the Twin Cities metropolitan region of Minnesota, known as the Conservation Affiliates, asked the United States Secretary of Agriculture Orville Freeman to stop logging and the use of motor vehicles in the Boundary Waters. On May 21, 1964, Secretary Freeman announced that he had appointed a Boundary Waters Canoe Area review committee, chaired by George A. Selke. Other members of this committee included Wayne Olson, Minnesota's conservation commissioner; Rollie Johnson, news director from WCCO-TV; and David J. Winton, chairman of the board of Winton Lumber Company. They reported their findings on December 15, 1964. They recommended that logging be banned in more parts of the area and more regulations be imposed on motorboat and snowmobile use. Secretary Freeman accepted the report and decided to allow a one-year period for public comment due to the controversy surrounding the issues.

=== Wilderness Act of 1964 ===
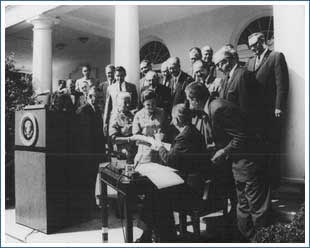
President Lyndon B. Johnson signing the Wilderness Act in 1964

The U.S. Congress passed the Wilderness Act on September 3, 1964. This new law made the Boundary Waters Canoe Area part of the new National Wilderness Preservation System and became an "instant wilderness." However, the act left much of the management, specifically in regards to logging and motorboat use, in the hands of the Secretary of Agriculture. The BWCA was the only area with such major exceptions in management policy.

=== Freeman Directive ===
On December 15, 1965, Secretary Freeman issued his directive implementing the recommendations of the Wilderness Act and the Selke committee. The Freeman Directive increased the no-cutting zones where logging is banned by 150,000 acres (610 km^{2}) immediately and designated an additional 100,000 acres (400 km^{2}) to be added in 1975 after the logging contracts in that area expired. This increased the total no-cutting zone to 612,000 acres (2,480 km^{2}) by 1975. Motorboats were still allowed on over half of the water area and snowmobiles were allowed on designated routes. The Freeman Directive governed the management of the BWCA for the next 13 years.

This order created two zones, an Interior Zone where commercial timber harvesting is banned, and a Portal Zone, where timber may be harvested except for areas within 400 feet (120 m) of lakes or streams suitable for watercraft and portages which connect these waterways. This decision was implemented to maintain and preserve the beautiful scenery of the area and to avoid the pristine waters from gathering pollution. Several areas of virgin forests that had been untouched by the logging industry were added to the Interior zone with this directive. The most notable examples are the area between Loon Lake and Lake Agnes as well as the area northwest of Cherokee Lake. 200,000 acres (810 km^{2}) of virgin forest were still left in the Portal Zone and were vulnerable to logging.

=== Logging trials ===
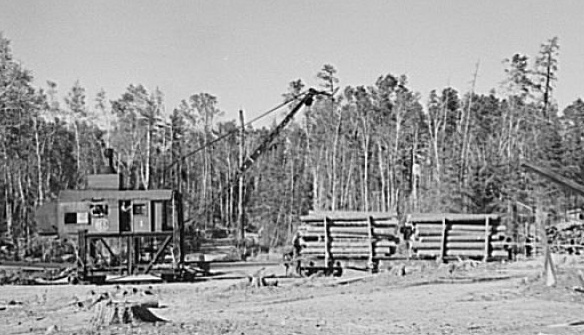
Historic logging in northern Minnesota.

On November 24, 1972, the Minnesota Public Interest Research Group (MPIRG) filed a lawsuit in federal district court in Minneapolis, which became known as MPIRG v. Butz. The suit sought a court order which would require logging companies to file an environmental impact statement (EIS) before renewing contracts under the National Environmental Policy Act (NEPA). The MPIRG also requested that logging in virgin forests be suspended until the environmental impact statement is completed. On April 16, 1973, Judge Miles Lord stated that seven timber contracts did harvest trees from virgin forests which would require an EIS under the NEPA. He issued an injunction against logging on these areas until completion of an EIS. In his opinion, the Wilderness Act of 1964 did not permit logging in the virgin forests of the BWCA.

After the EIS was released in August 1974, the MPIRG filed a second lawsuit along with the Sierra Club as a coplaintiff. They claimed that logging in virgin tracts of land was a violation of the Wilderness Act and they wished to permanently ban logging. Judge Lord issued a temporary injunction until the start of the trial on November 4, 1974. Judge Lord issued his final decision for MPIRG and Sierra Club v. Butz et al. on August 13, 1975. For the most part, he ruled in favor of the plaintiffs. He found that timber cutting within blocks of virgin forests violated the intent of the Wilderness Act and was illegal. Also, the United States Forest Service was no longer allowed to conduct sales.

== Legislative history ==
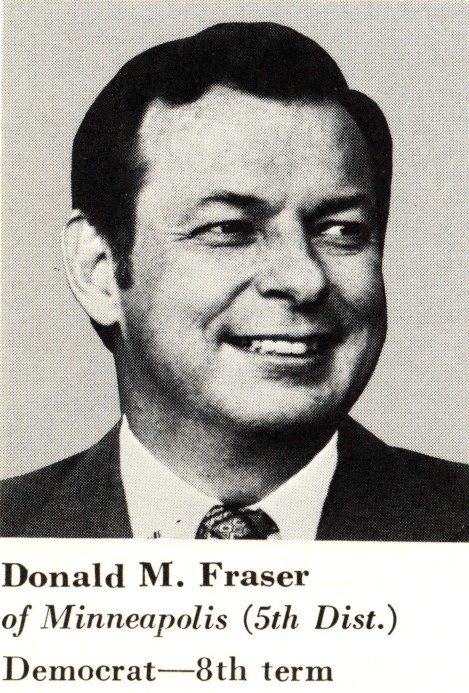
1977 Congressional picture of Donald Fraser

On October 24, 1975, Representative Jim Oberstar introduced bill H.R. 10247 which would resolve the BWCA lawsuits. His bill split the area into two parts. Some 625,000 acres (2,530 km^{2}) would be given full wilderness status, while the remaining 527,000 acres (2,130 km^{2}) would be declared a National Recreation Area and still be open to logging and use by motorized vehicles. This bill was strongly opposed by environmentalists Among the largest group of opposition was the pro-wilderness Friends of the Boundary Waters, led by Kevin Proescholdt.

Representative Oberstar explained his position in a 1977 news conference:

My view is that we ought to have protection, but more intensified, more broad-based recreational use of the BWCA, plus some very limited commercial timber harvesting in the second growth areas of the BWCA.

About one year later, Representative Donald Fraser introduced H.R. 14576 in the U.S. House of Representatives. This bill would give wilderness status to all of the BWCA and would end logging, motorized vehicles, and mining.

The Eighth Circuit Court of Appeals overturned Judge Lord's logging decision on August 30, 1976. The logging injunctions were lifted by December of the same year. At the same time, Representative Oberstar worked with several large lumber companies with the Forest Service acting as a mediator to suspend cutting for six months while Congress could examine the issue without further damage to the environment and external pressure.

In order to resolve issues between the two bills, a U.S. House subcommittee on national parks and recreation held two field hearings in July 1977 in Minnesota. The first took place in a State Capitol hearing room filled to capacity in St. Paul, Minnesota. Notable wilderness supporters which were present included State Rep. Willard Munger. The hollowing hearing took place the next day in the northern town of Ely on the edge of the BWCA. Both supporters of the logging industry and environmentalists came out in large numbers to show their support. Environmentalist Sigurd Olson spoke of the need to protect the Boundary Waters. After the hearings, another bill was drafted and unveiled in March 1978, this time sponsored by California's Phillip Burton, chair of the Interior's National Parks and Insular Affairs subcommittee, and Minnesota Representative Bruce Vento. This bill called for the complete termination of logging. This bill stalled until negotiations took place between Ely City Attorney Ron Walls and environmental attorney Chuck Dayton. The final measure became known as the Dayton-Walls agreement. On October 15, 1978 in the final hours of the Ninety-fifth Congress, the House and the Senate passed the revised version of H.R. 12250. The bill was signed on October 21, 1978 by President Jimmy Carter.

== Provisions ==
The BWCA Wilderness Act officially changed the name of the over one million acres (4,000 km²) of land known as the Boundary Waters Canoe Area to the Boundary Waters Canoe Area Wilderness. Over 50,000 acres (200 km^{2}) were added to the wilderness, which brought the total area to 1,098,057 acres (4,443.68 km^{2}). This Act also instated regulations for many debated topics which were brought about by the Wilderness Act of 1964. Although the area may look nearly the same as it did prior to 1978, it is currently much quieter and mostly free of motorized vehicles.

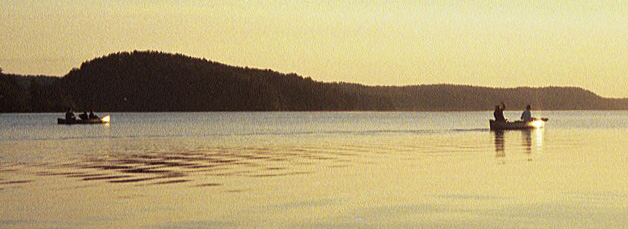
Two canoes paddling into the sunrise on Saganaga Lake.

=== Motorboat restrictions ===
The use of motorboats in the wilderness was highly controversial, as they caused noise and environmental pollution. As a result, one of the first provisions of the Act was to prohibit the use of motorboats in the wilderness, as well as in lakes which border the wilderness, effective January 1, 1978. It restricted motorboats to 24% of the water surface area of the BWCA. Lakes with motorboat access are typically large lakes served by either access roads or mechanical portages.

==== 25 horsepower limit ====
However, there are numerous exceptions to these restrictions. Motorboats with motors no greater than 25 horsepower (19 kW) may be used on the following lakes:

- Trout Lake
- Fall Lake
- Moose Lake
- Newfound Lake
- Sucker Lake
- Newton Lake
- South Farm Lake
- East Bearskin Lake
- Snowbank Lake
- Saganaga Lake east of American Point
- Basswood Lake (except portion northwest of Washington Island and north of Jackfish Bay)

This limit does not apply to towboats used to transport canoes on the lakes of Moose, Newfound, Sucker, and Saganaga until January 1, 1984.

Birch Lake and the portion north of Jackfish Bay in Basswood Lake have a 25 horsepower (19 kW) limit only until January 1, 1984.

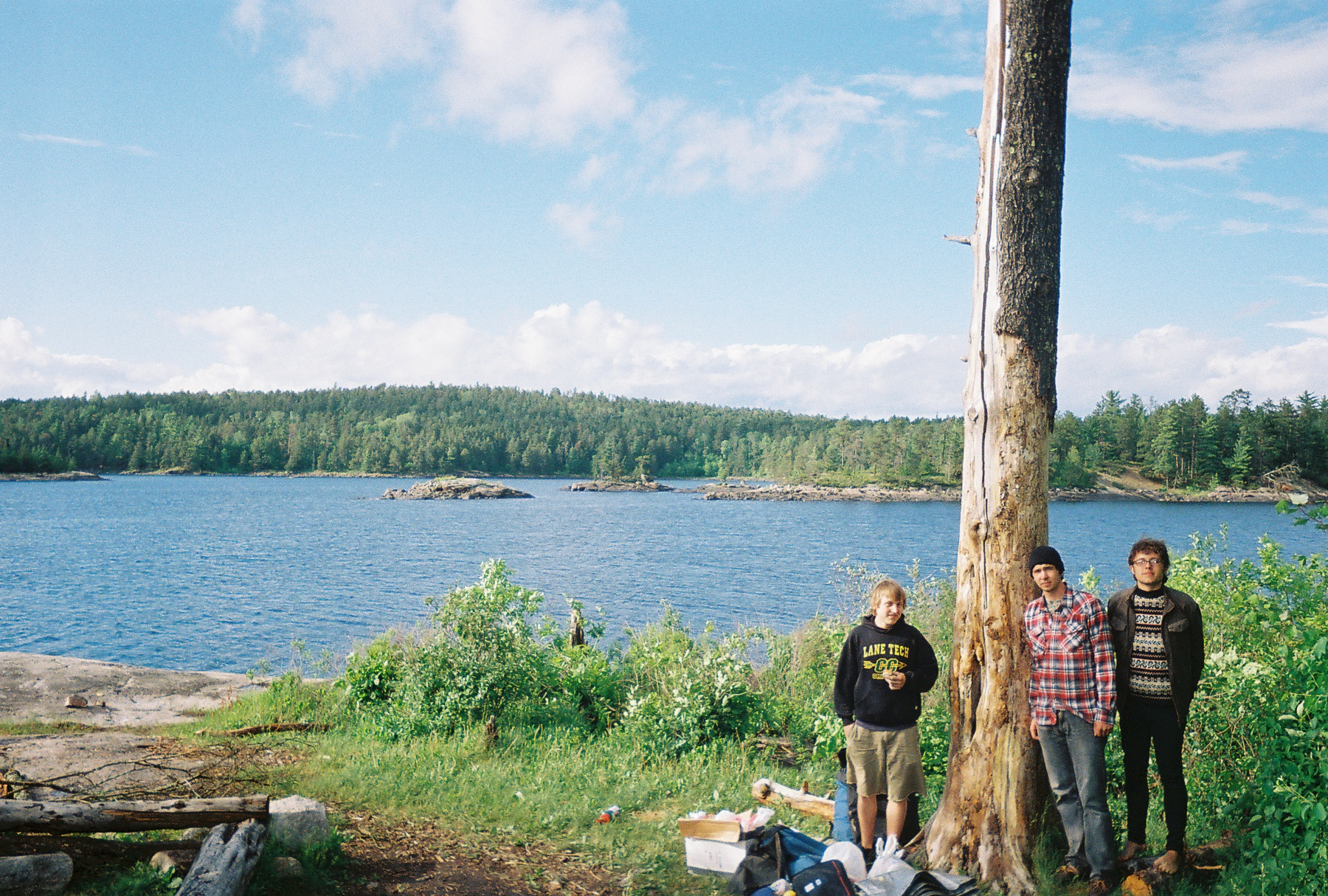
A group of young canoeists at a campsite on Iron Lake in the BWCA.

==== 10 horsepower limit ====
Motorboats with motors no greater than ten horsepower are to be permitted on the following lakes and river:

- Sea Gull Lake east of Three mile Island
- Clearwater Lake
- North Fowl Lake
- South Fowl Lake
- Island River east of Lake Isabella
- Alder Lake
- Canoe Lake

Certain lakes are limited to 10 horsepower (7.5 kW) until a specified date. These lakes include: Basswood River to and including Crooked Lake in Saint Louis and Lake Counties until January 1, 1984, Carp Lake, the Knife River and Knife Lake in Lake County until January 1, 1984, Sea Gull Lake, the portion generally west of Threemile Island until January 1, 1999, and Brule Lake in Cook County until January 1, 1994.

==== No horsepower limit ====
The Act designated the following lakes as being free of the horsepower limit:

- Little Vermilion Lake
- Loon River
- Loon Lake
- Lac La Croix south of Snow Bay and east of Wilkins Bay

=== Snowmobile restrictions ===
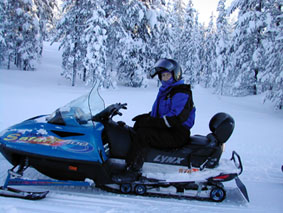
A typical snowmobile in a snowy landscape

Snowmobiles were also considered by many visitors to be destructive and noisy. Therefore, this Act prohibited the use of snowmobiles in all areas of the wilderness except for the following: the overland portages from Crane Lake to Little Vermilion Lake in Canada, and from Sea Gull River along the eastern portion of Saganaga Lake to Canada. Snowmobiles may be used on Vermilion Lake portage to and including Trout Lake, Moose Lake to and including Saganaga Lake via Ensign, Vera and Knife Lakes, and East Bearskin Lake to and including Pine Lake via Alder Lake and Canoe Lake until January 1, 1984. Snowmobiles must be less than 40 inches (1,000 mm) in width.

=== Logging restrictions ===
The Act stated that the Secretary of Agriculture must terminate all timber sale contracts in the BWCA within one year of its passage. The logging in virgin forests was to terminate immediately. The one year termination period allows contracts to expire and for the logging companies to take corrective steps to clean up and restore tracts of timber which were harvested heavily. The U.S. government paid compensation for any timber contracts terminated or modified by this Act.

=== Mining restrictions ===
Mining became restricted in the BWCA and the Secretary of Agriculture has the authority to acquire mineral rights in the Wilderness and along three road corridors in a 222,000-acre (900 km^{2}) Mining Protection Area.

=== Quotas ===
The Act also established quotas for daytime use of motorboats on the lakes where they are permitted. Cabin owners, resorts, and their guests are exempt on their own lakes. The quotas are based on criteria such as the size and configuration of each lake. The quotas may not exceed the annual average actual annual motorboat use of the calendar years 1976, 1977, and 1978 for each lake and must take into account fluctuations in use during different seasons.

== Amendments and legal challenges ==
Although the BWCA Wilderness Act was never officially amended, several attempts were made between 1979 and 1982 by the state of Minnesota to challenge the law in court. All of these were eventually upheld by the United States Court of Appeals for the Eighth Circuit. The Supreme Court of the United States refused to review this opinion in 1982.
