= North Lake station =

Railway station in Ontario, Canada

North Lake
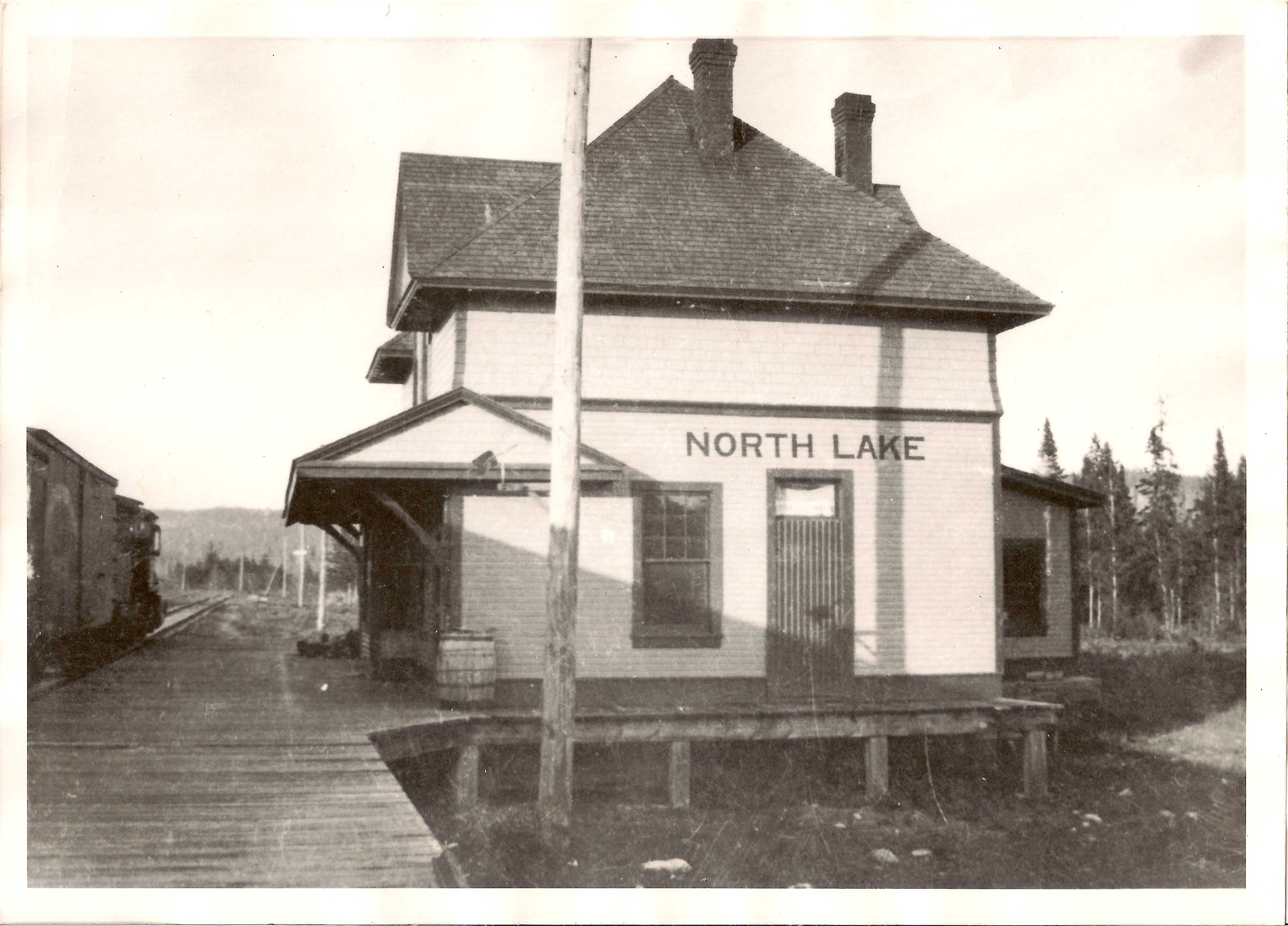

General information
- Coordinates: 48°08′14″N 90°28′10″W
- Platforms: 1 side platform
- Tracks: 1

Construction
- Structure type: Elevated

History
- Opened: 1907
- Closed: 1923
- Former names: Port Arthur, Duluth and Western Railway; Canadian Northern Railway
Location

North Lake is a former railway station located near North Lake, Thunder Bay District in Ontario, Canada. It lies close to La Verendrye Provincial Park and to the well known Boundary Waters Canoe Area Wilderness in the Boundary Waters between Canada and the United States. It was constructed in 1907 as a major station along the Port Arthur, Duluth and Western Railway.

== History ==
The history of the North Lake Station dates back to 1892. That year the Port Arthur, Duluth and Western Railway, which began construction in 1889, was nearing completion to its western terminus at Gunflint Lake. A workers camp was located at North Lake, approximately 72 miles from the town of Port Arthur, Ontario. When the railway was completed in 1893, it was decided to locate a station at North Lake, one mile east of the old construction camp. The original station was a log freight shed that measured 26 x40 feet.

In 1899 the PAD&W was sold to William Mackenzie and Donald Mann and later became part of Canadian Northern Railway (CNoR). In 1902, CNoR stopped running trains to Gunflint and North Lake became the terminus of the re-christened CNoR-Duluth Extension. In March 1907 it was announced that a new station would be constructed at Silver Mountain, 39 miles from Port Arthur. Since it was a near copy of Silver Mountain, it can be assumed that the station at North Lake was replaced the same year.

The new station was a two-storey structure with an attached freight shed that measured 46 ft × 22 ft (14.0 m × 6.7 m). It also included a wye to allow trains to turn around and reverse direction. It was one of Canadian Northern's 3rd Class Stations, typical used in rural areas. This pattern was designed by architect Ralph Benjamin Pratt and first introduced in 1901 as plan 100-3. North Lake utilized the updated Plan 100-29 which debuted in 1907 and resulted in a slightly larger station.

In 1918 the bankrupt CNoR was nationalized into the Canadian National Railways (CNR) and the line became known as the CNR-North Lake Sub-Division. North Lake Station remained in service until 1923, when, due to a lack of business on this portion of line, CNR decided to shorten the line by 24 miles. Service terminated at Mackies on Whitefish Lake, Milepost 47. The station and its nearby coal bunker were abandoned by CNR.

== Silver Mountain Station ==
A near copy of North Lake was constructed at Silver Mountain, 31 miles to the east, in 1907. This station still stands, at the intersection of Highway 588 and Highway 593 and is operated as a restaurant.

== Replica ==
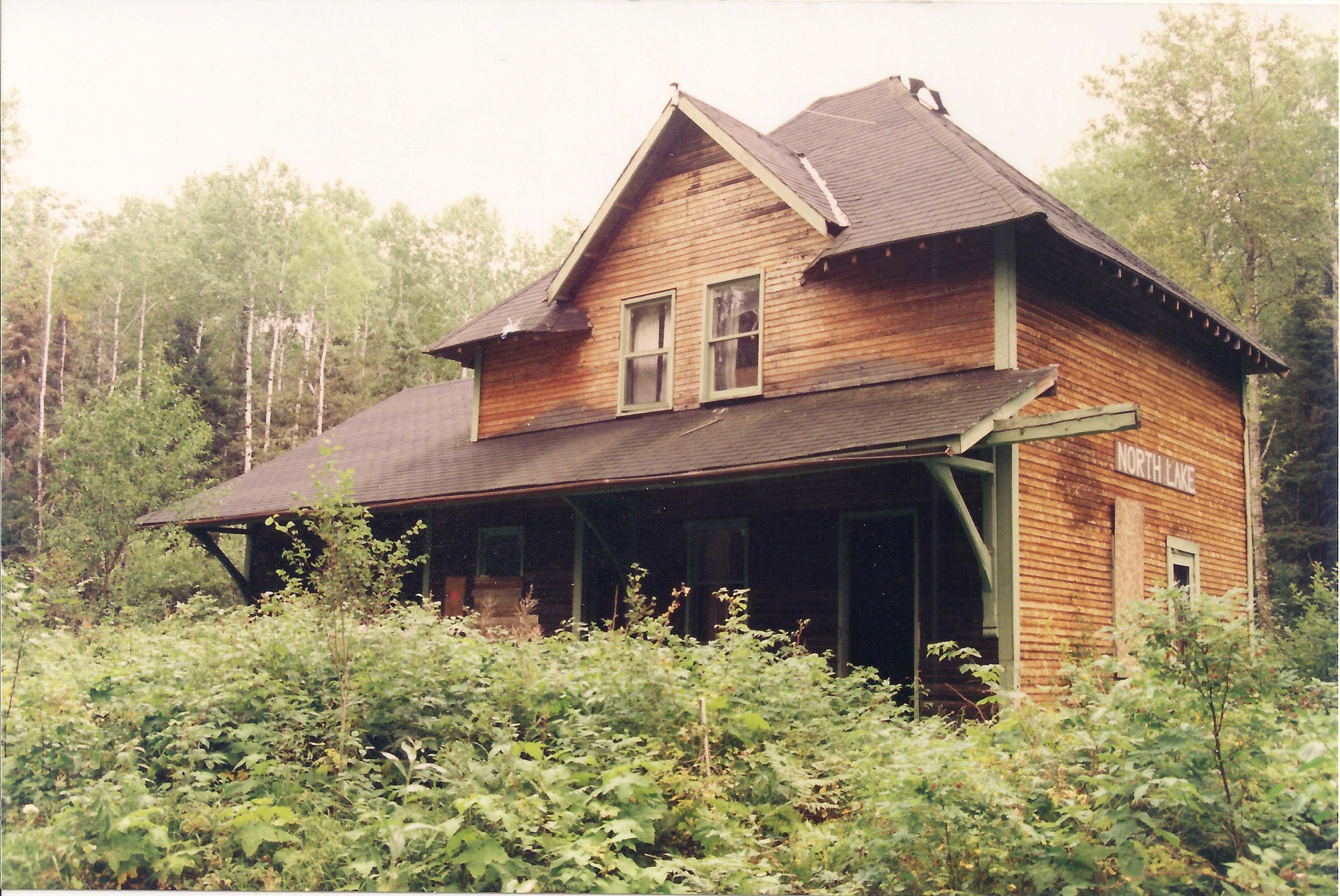
Replica North Lake Station 1994

North Lake Station sat derelict in its remote locate until the 1970s when efforts were made to save the deteriorating structure. A group based out of Nolalu called the Localmotive Society attempted to renovate the old station. Unfortunately resistance from the Ontario Ministry of Natural Resources (MNR) forced the group to alter their plans and construct a replica station one mile east on Addie Lake. Work began in early in 1977 and was completed by the end of that summer. However, attempts to create a park and trails around the station were never realized and the replica was burned by the MNR in 2004.

== Today ==
When the replica station was constructed in 1977, the Ministry of Natural Resources decided to burn the collapsing structure the original station. The remains, as well as those of the fairly well-preserved coal bunker, sat overgrown in the brush beside the former railway grade. In 1999 the entire Boundary Waters area was hit by an intense weather system that caused massive blowdowns, and became known as the Boundary Waters – Canadian derecho. The storm caused extensive damage to the site, particularly to the coal bunker. In recent years the station remains have been completely overtaken by the forest growth and are in a state of terminal decomposition.

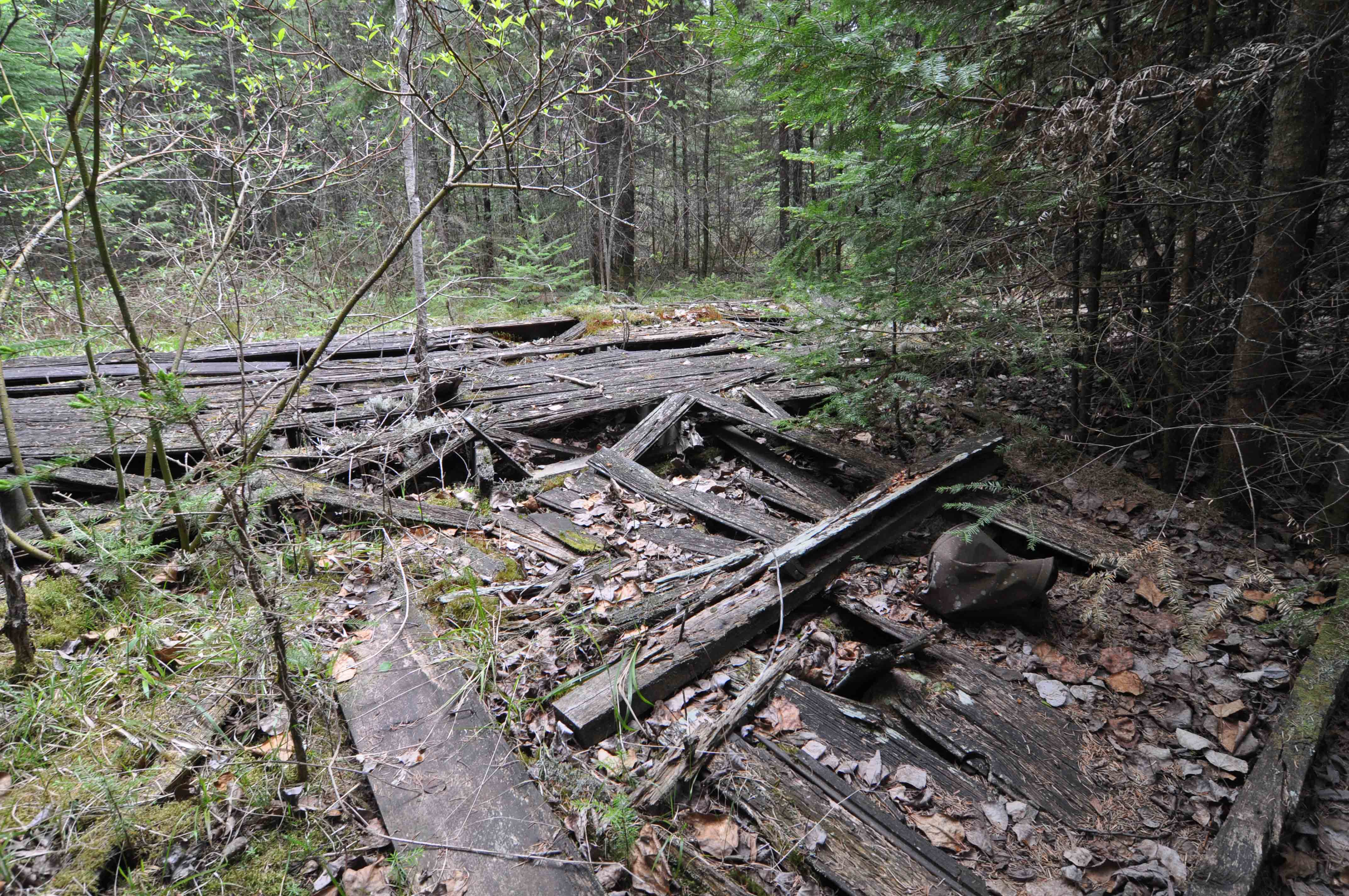
Remains of North Lake Station photographed in May 2010.

== See also ==
Silver Mountain Station
Leeblain Station
