= Leeblain =

- Ghost town
- Location within Ontario
- Coordinates: 48.10455°N 90.70995°W
- Country: Canada
- Province: Ontario
- District: Thunder Bay District
- Established: 1893

Government
  - MP: Marcus Powlowski
  - MLA: Judith Monteith-Farrell
- Time zone: CST
- Railways: Port Arthur, Duluth and Western Railway; Canadian Northern Railway

Leeblain is a ghost town in the Canadian province of Ontario, located on the north shore of Gunflint Lake in the Thunder Bay District, partly within La Verendrye Provincial Park and next to the Boundary Waters Canoe Area Wilderness in the Boundary Waters between Canada and the United States.

== History ==
The town Leeblain was created back in 1893 as a stop on the Port Arthur, Duluth and Western Railway (mile 83). Leeblain was named after two Toronto businessmen who were important investors in the railway, Arthur Brindley Lee (Rice, Lewis & Son) and Hugh Blain (Eby, Blain & Co.). It was hoped that the town would grow into a "metropolis" because of the business generated by the iron mines immediately across the border in Minnesota that were part of the Gunflint Range. The railway planned for Leeblain to be its major terminal point outside of Port Arthur, with a roundhouse and other maintenance facilities.

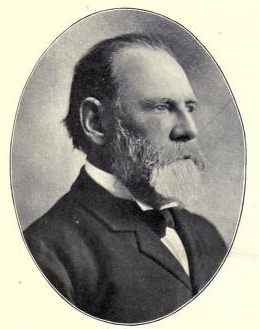
Arthur B. Lee

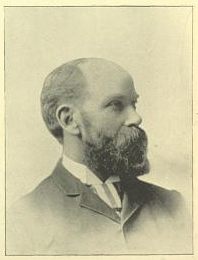
Hugh Blain

Located at Leeblain was a framed station that measured 20 by 40 feet and a 1200-foot siding. There was also a two-storey hotel/trading post, as well as several smaller buildings. The town site was also used as a worker camp during the construction of the railway, and some of the Italian labourers built rock ovens to bake their bread. The hotel at Leeblain was operated for a time by Adolph Perras who was previously a businessman in the town of Port Arthur.

With the collapse of the Paulson Mine and the failure of the Port Arthur, Duluth and Western Railway to reach the Duluth and Iron Range Railroad at Ely, Minnesota, there was very little business along Gunflint Lake. The railway was purchased by Canadian Northern Railway in 1899 and the new company stopped running trains past North Lake in 1903. That same year the Government of Canada opened a customs outport at the eastern end of Gunflint Lake under the name "Leeblain", mostly to serve the short railroad known as the Gunflint and Lake Superior that was transporting logs from Minnesota to Port Arthur. The outport closed in 1909 and most of the rails west of North Lake were removed in 1915.

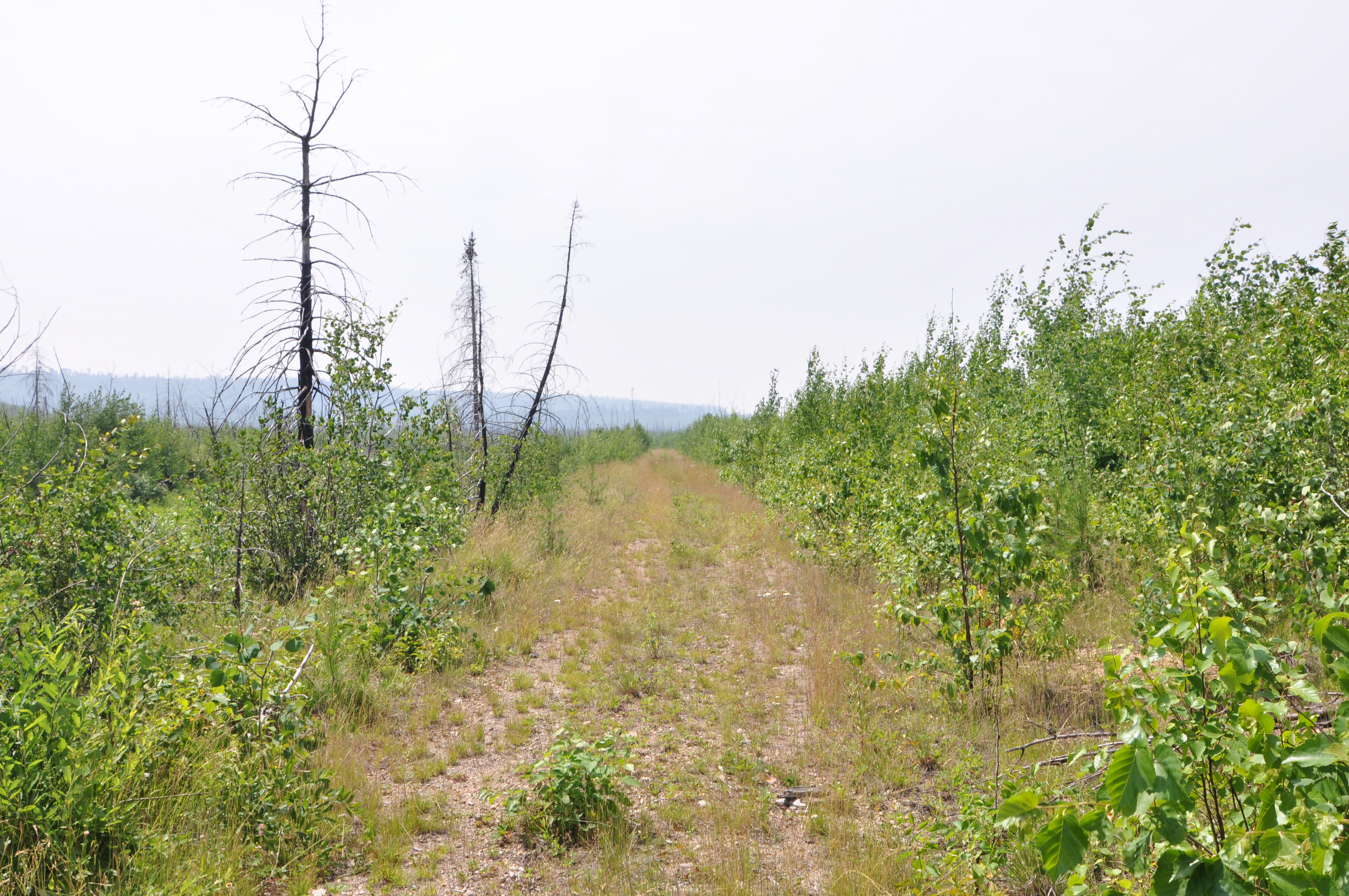
Remains of the railway siding at Leeblain, July 2011.

Leeblain was forgotten and became overgrown after the removal of the rails. Inaccessible from the Canadian side of Gunflint Lake, the site was often visited by locals and visitors from the American side. In 1991 the former grade was cleared by the Ontario Federation of Snowmobile Clubs and Leeblain became accessible again from Canada. The only visible features were the siding and at least four rock ovens scattered around the site. In 1999 the entire Boundary Waters area was hit by an intense weather system that caused massive blowdowns, and became known as the Boundary Waters – Canadian derecho. The storm and the subsequent logging to clear the blowdown caused severe damage to the site, damaging several of the rock ovens and disturbing the building sites. In 2007 the Boundary Waters area was burned by the Ham Lake Fire that originated in Minnesota near the Gunflint Trail; the immense forest fire removed what little vegetation that remained at Leeblain.

== See also ==
- Silver Mountain Station
- North Lake Station
