= Silver Mountain station =

Railway station in Ontario, Canada

Silver Mountain
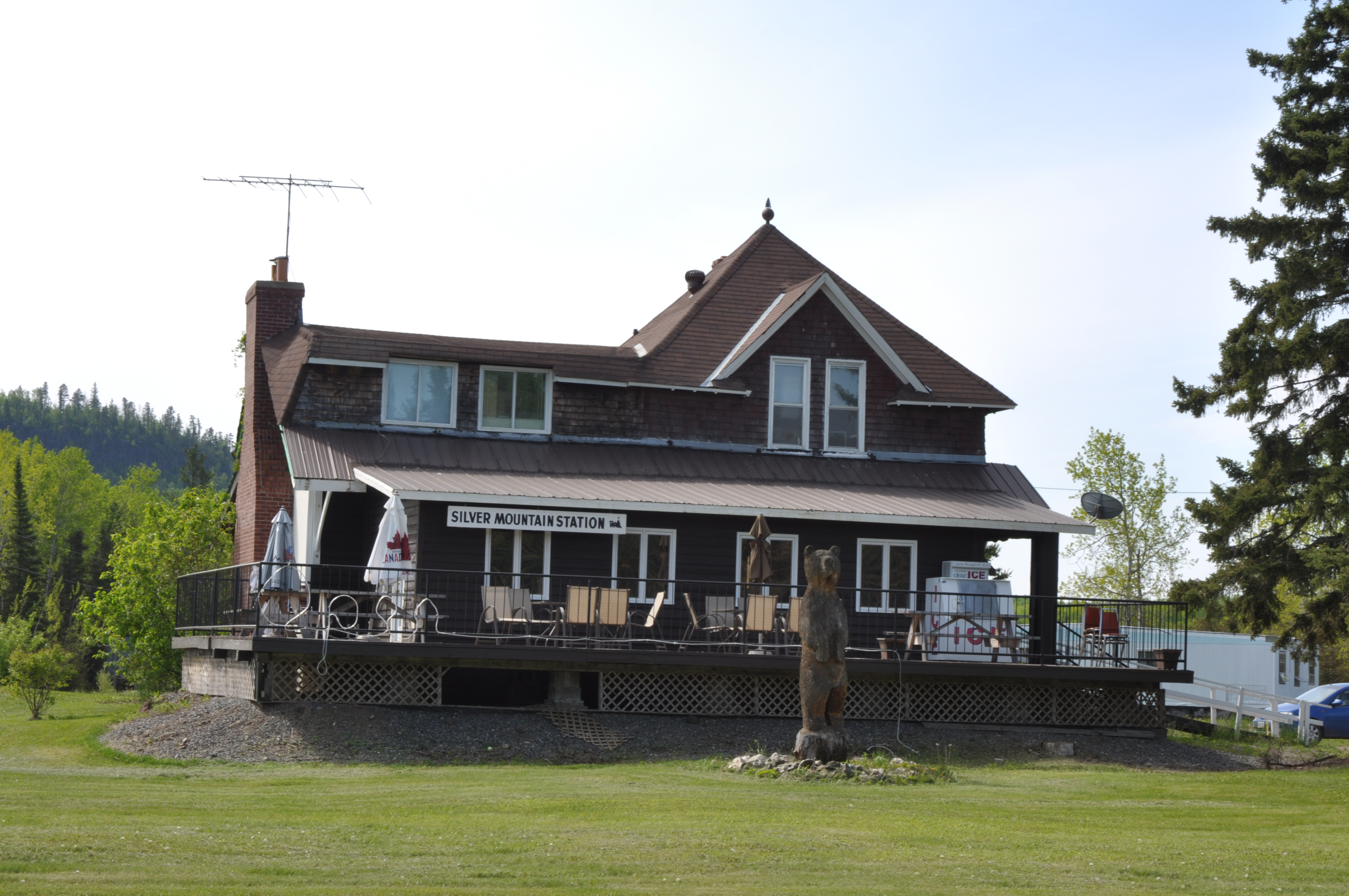

General information
- Location: 3065 Highway 588 Silver Mountain, Ontario
- Coordinates: 48°15′33″N 89°53′47″W
- Platforms: 1 side platform
- Tracks: 1

Construction
- Structure type: Elevated

History
- Opened: 1907
- Former names: Port Arthur, Duluth and Western Railway; Canadian Northern Railway; Canadian National Railways
Location

The Silver Mountain station is a historic railway station located in the Thunder Bay District, Ontario. It sits at the intersection of Highway 588 and Highway 593. Now operated as a restaurant, it was constructed in 1907 as a major station along the Port Arthur, Duluth and Western Railway. It is also currently home to the Silver Mountain and Area Historical Society.

== History ==
The history of the Silver Mountain area dates back to 1881 when prospector Oliver Daunais discovered silver southwest of Thunder Bay. This discovery became the Rabbit Mountain Mine in 1882, and quickly a number of other mines were opened in the same vicinity. In 1884 Daunais would locate silver further west of the Rabbit Mine around an 1800-foot hill that would eventually bear the name “Silver Mountain.” Two mines were constructed on either side of the mountain; Silver Mountain East End and Silver Mountain West End.

In 1889 the Port Arthur, Duluth and Western Railway (PAD&W) was constructed into the area to exploit these mines, as well as iron deposits closer to the Canada–United States border at Gunflint Lake. To serve the workings at Silver Mountain, a station was established on the railway several kilometres north of the mines and 39 miles from the town of Port Arthur, Ontario. This station was a crude log structure that measured 10 x 20 feet.

In 1899 the PAD&W was sold to William Mackenzie and Donald Mann and later became part of Canadian Northern Railway (CNoR). Responding to an increase in business in the area, CNoR decided to construct a larger station at Silver Mountain. Plans were announced in March 1907 and the building was completed shortly thereafter. The new station was a two-storey structure with an attached freight shed that measured 50 x 25. It was a typical Canadian Northern Railway 3rd Class Station built according to Plan 100-3 and designed by Ralph Benjamin Pratt.

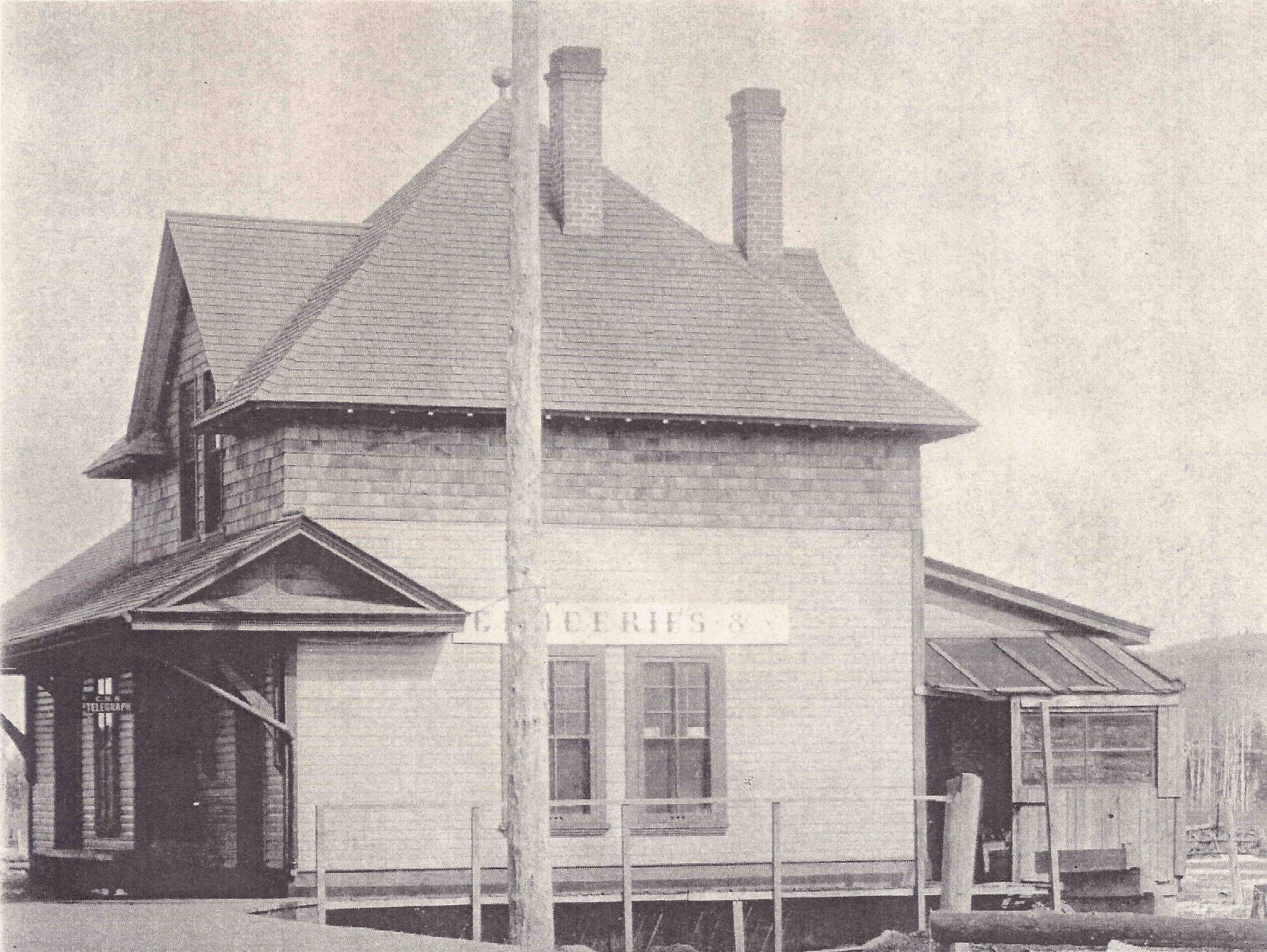
Silver Mountain station c.1910.

In 1910 the station became home to Dorothea Mitchell. Affectionately known as the “Lady Lumberjack,” she arrived at Silver Mountain just as the silver mines were closing. She convinced Canadian Northern to allow her to stay on as manager and postmistress at the station. When the general store she ran out the station proved less than profitable, Dorothea purchased a sawmill and waded into the lumber business.

In 1919 the bankrupt CNoR was nationalized into the Canadian National Railways (CNR) and the line became known as the CNR-North Lake Sub-Division. The station remained open, but business on the “PD” line continued to decline. In March 1938, the last rain ran on the line. After years of operating losses and deteriorating infrastructure, CNR decided to abandon the line and the rails were removed the following year.

For over 25 years the station served as a private residence. Beginning in the early 1970s, four successive owners would alter the existing structure. A basement was added, along with a stone fireplace, and additions to the front, rear and second storey. The renovations transformed the station into a bar, and later a restaurant.

== Today ==
In June 2010 the station property was purchased by current owner David Chevalier and operation of the restaurant was turned over to his sister-in-law, Shelley Simon. Restaurant no longer operating.

== North Lake Station ==
When Canadian Northern constructed the station at Silver Mountain in 1907, they also erected an exact copy at North Lake, 31 miles to the west. It served as the terminus of the railway until 1923 when trains stopped running past Mackies (mile 46) on Whitefish Lake.

== Silver Mountain and Area Historical Society ==
Operating out of the historic building is the newly created Silver Mountain and Area Historical Society. Formed in October 2012, the SMHS is a group dedicated to preserving and promoting the history of the area around Silver Mountain southwest to the Boundary Waters between Canada and the United States. A non-profit organization, the society's mandate includes the Port Arthur, Duluth and Western Railway, the Station and the cultural and economic history of the area, such as settlements, mining and logging. The society is governed by an elected board of directors and is affiliated with the Ontario Historical Society.

== See also ==
- North Lake Station
- Leeblain Station
