= Paulson Mine =

Iron mine in Cook County, Minnesota, United States

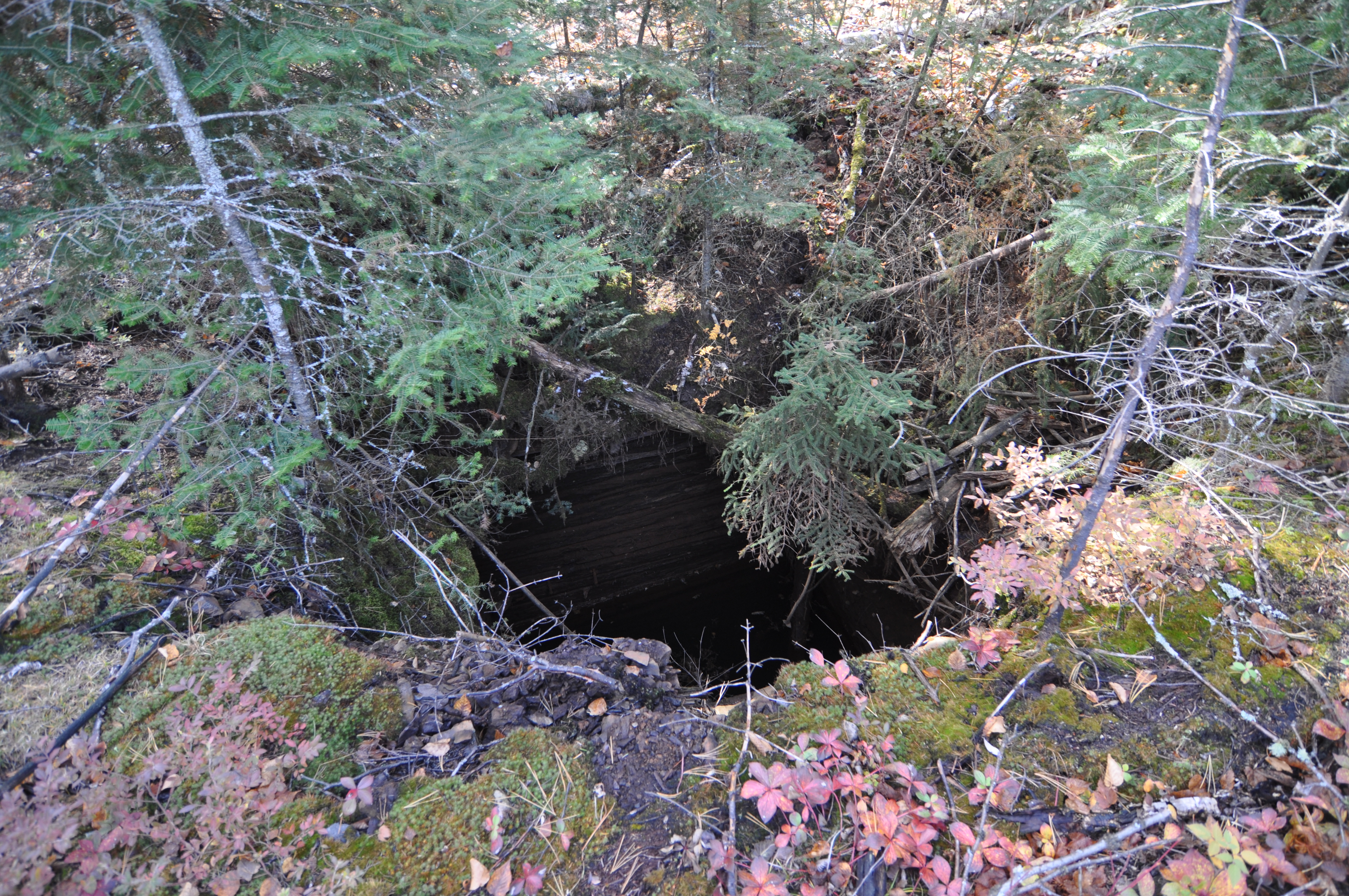
- Paulson Mine, October 2012

- Location in Minnesota
- Location: Cook County, Minnesota, United States; 48°05′13″N 90°50′28″W
- Products: Iron ore
- Opened: 1888
- Closed: 1893

The Paulson Mine is a former iron ore mine located in Cook County, Minnesota, United States, 53 kilometres north-west of Grand Marais, Minnesota near the end of the historic Gunflint Trail. The Port Arthur, Duluth and Western Railway was built to the mine in 1892 to access the ore, but both the mine and railway failed.

== Early history ==
The existence of iron bearing rocks in the Gunflint Lake area was first mentioned as early as 1850. Eventually these deposits would be linked to the famous Mesabi Iron Range and this eastern portion which extended into Ontario became known as the Gunflint Range. Conclusive evidence of the quality of iron in the area would not come until 1886 when Grand Marais pioneer Hazael "Henry" Mayhew made discoveries at the western end of the lake. This then attracted the attention of investors in the state capital.

In late 1886 an enterprise known as the American Realty Company was incorporated in Minnesota. Several of its promoters had ties to the recently established State Bank of Minneapolis, namely John Paulson and Kristian Kortgaard. With financial backing from the bank, the American Realty Company would purchase large tracts of land in Township 65, Range 4 West (T65, R4W) of Cook County. Later in 1892, Paulson and Kortgaard, along with Orrin D. Kinney of Ely would incorporate the Gunflint Lake Iron Company to mine the iron deposits.

The mine required an outlet for its ore, and that would be provided by a Canadian line, the Port Arthur, Duluth and Western (PAD&W). Originally chartered in 1883 as the Thunder Bay Colonization Railway, the line changed its name and route in 1887 to tap the iron deposits of the Gunflint Range. Construction began in 1889, and by 1892 the rails had been laid to the Canadian terminus at Gunflint Lake and work had begun across the boundary. A US charter was obtained, known as the PAD&W of Minnesota, to allow construction to the mine and eventually to Ely to link with the Duluth and Iron Range Railroad. Work was completed in late 1892 and the line was opened for traffic in January 1893.

Explorations in T65, R4W began sometime in 1888, but really did not gather much steam until the railway began to approach the area in 1891. Work was concentrated in sections 28 and 29, three and a half miles southwest of the Gunflint Narrows. Numerous test pits were dug to ascertain the quality of the ore, and eventually three timber-lined mine shafts were completed. The principal shaft, the "Paulson Mine," was located in the northeast quadrant of section 28 and was approximately one hundred and five feet deep.

== Gunflint City ==
Located 350 metres southwest of the Paulson shaft was a mining encampment established at same time that explorations in the area began. Eventually it was decided that this site would become a permanent settlement for the soon-to-be expansive mining operations. Work began in the late winter of 1892 and continued into the spring; this American metropolis would be christened "Gunflint City." The promoter of this new town was the American Realty Company, the same company that owned many sections of land in the area. They would publish an elaborate plat map in early 1893 entitled "Gun Flint Iron Range" which spoke of the great promise of the area. Located at Gunflint City was a unique business established by Fort William, Ontario "entrepreneur" Margaret "Mag" Matthews. Mag was a very well-known madame in Fort William and she was obviously hoping to cash in on the business generated by the railway and the iron mine. Her "Hotel de Marguerite" was completed in November 1892 and in January 1893 she received the first liquor license granted in Cook County.

== Today ==
The Paulson Mine, as well as the other nearby shafts and test pits lie within the confines of the United States Forest Service's Superior National Forest. It is adjacent to the renowned Boundary Waters Canoe Area, as well as the Kekekabic Trail.

In 1999 the entire Boundary Waters area was hit by an intense weather system that caused massive blowdowns, and became known as the Boundary Waters – Canadian derecho. In 2007 the area was burned by the Ham Lake Fire that originated at Ham Lake south the Gunflint Trail. The Forest Service used the fire as the impetus to create a new hiking trail. Opened in 2009 to commemorate the 100th anniversary of the Forest Service, the 3.3 mile Centennial Trail allows hikers to walk along portions of the old railway grade and visit some of the shafts and test pits (but not the Paulson shaft).

== See also ==
- Port Arthur, Duluth and Western Railway
- Gunflint Range
