= Height of Land Portage (Boundary Waters) =

Portage along the Boundary Waters route between Canada and the United States

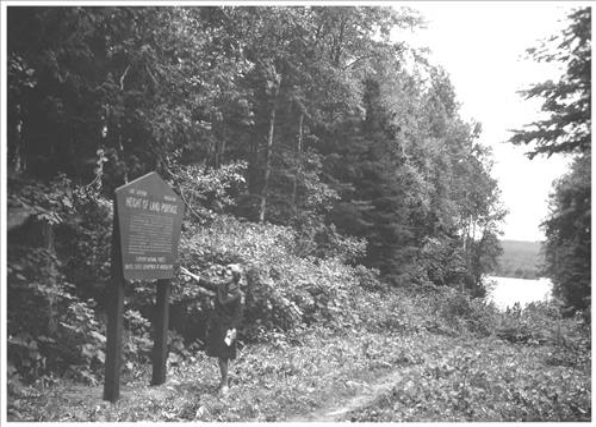
- Height of Land Portage Minnesota-Ontario

- Location within Minnesota Location within the United States
- 48°6′6″N 90°34′2″W
- Location: Cook County, Minnesota / Thunder Bay District, Ontario
- Nearest city: Grand Marais, Minnesota

Site notes
- Area: 2 acres (0.81 ha)
- Governing body: Federal

U.S. National Register of Historic Places
- Designated: October 18, 1974
- Reference no.: 74001012 Search in MN for Height of Land; this is the one located in Cook County.

Height of Land Portage is a portage along the historic Boundary Waters route between Canada and the United States. Located at the border of the Canadian province of Ontario and the U.S. state of Minnesota, the path is a relatively easy crossing of the Laurentian Divide separating the Hudson Bay and Great Lakes–St. Lawrence watersheds.

The portage was used for centuries by Indigenous peoples for canoe travel, teaching it to European voyageurs and coureurs des bois who used it to access the fur trading posts in Rupert's Land. For many years the portage was part of an important route from Lower Canada to the interior of the North American continent. It became part of the boundary between British North America and the United States following the American Revolution and treaties delineating the border. In recognition of this history, the portage is on the U.S. National Register of Historic Places, and is a Minnesota State Historic Site.

Located in La Verendrye Provincial Park and the Boundary Waters Canoe Area Wilderness in the unspoiled country along the international boundary, the portage retains its traditional use, but for recreational wilderness canoe trips rather than trade.

== Geography ==
The portage, 80 rods (0.25 mi; 400 m) long, crosses a low saddle between North Lake and South Lake. Between the lakes is a cleared strip of land which marks the Canada–United States border. South Lake is the source of the Arrow River, tributary to the Pigeon River, which flows east to Lake Superior, other Great Lakes, and the St. Lawrence River to the Atlantic Ocean. North Lake is in the watershed of the Rainy River, which drains by way of the Winnipeg and Nelson Rivers to Hudson Bay.

According to the Canada/US International Boundary Commission, Ontario's boundary with the United States runs 2700 kilometers on water and only about one kilometer on land. The 80-rod Height of Land Portage is a significant part of the land border; the remainder is along two other portages, Watap Portage (100 rods or 0.31 miles or 500 metres) a short distance to its east, and Swamp (or Monument) Portage (72–80 rods or 0.23–0.25 miles or 360–400 metres) to the west in the BWCA and Quetico Provincial Park.

== History ==
The Height of Land Portage may have had its origin as a route for foraging or migrating animals. Historians believe that many portages started as animal tracks, and were later used by the early inhabitants of the area. In the Pre-Contact Era (before peoples of the First Nations first encountered European explorers), those natives had long used birchbark canoes as the principal means of travel in the thick boreal forest of the Quetico-Superior area. The Height of Land Portage likely was used by those peoples.

The search for the Northwest Passage, the fur trade, and missionary activity brought European travelers to the area. La Vérendrye used native routes in 1732 to reach Rainy Lake. In the latter part of the eighteenth century it was used by voyageurs of the French-Canadian fur brigades as their main route from Grand Portage on Lake Superior to the pays d'en haut, the "upper country" beyond the height of land separating the Great Lakes from the fur country in the Northwest; see Canadian canoe routes. At one time there was a refitting station on the west end of the portage where canoes were repaired.

Voyageurs coming for the first time to the pays d'en haut were initiated after crossing the portage. Each newcomer would be sprinkled with a cedar bough dipped in water, and be made to swear that he would not allow another novice to pass that way without undergoing similar rites and that he would never kiss another voyageur's wife without her consent. Concluding the ceremony with a gunfire salute and drinks of "high wine" (a type of rum), the new Homme du nord or Nor'wester and his company would resume their journey.

== Inclusion in international border ==
Following the American Revolution the Treaty of Paris set the international boundary between British North America and the United States along the line of water communication between Lake Superior and the Lake of the Woods. During the era of exploration there were three principal routes used by canoe brigades to connect these two lakes, all of which crossed the divide separating western Lake Superior from the Hudson Bay watershed:

- the Grand Portage route to Rainy Lake, which used the portage described in this article;
- to the east, the Kam–Dog–Maligne route used by early French explorer Jacques de Noyon in 1688, which headed north from the lake at the site of Fort William, Ontario, up the Kaministiquia and Dog Rivers to Cold Water Lake, crossed the divide by Prairie Portage to Height of Land Lake, then went west by way of the Savanne, Pickerel, and Maligne Rivers to Lake La Croix where it joined the Grand Portage route; and
- to the west, the St. Louis–Vermilion route, which went from Lake Superior at Fond du Lac (the "end of the lake") near modern Duluth, Minnesota, up the St. Louis and Embarrass Rivers, across the height of land (by a portage which also bears the name Height of Land Portage) to Pike River and Lake Vermilion, then down the Vermilion River to the Grand Portage route.

Britain asserted that the westernmost St. Louis-Vermilion route was the usual line of water communications, while the United States advocated the easternmost Kam–Dog–Maligne Route. Following surveys in the early nineteenth century, the Webster-Ashburton Treaty of 1842 fixed the route along the Pigeon River and the Height of Land Portage between North and South Lakes.

Since then, the portage has been recognized as part of the border. "Free and open to the use of the citizens and subjects of both countries", it continues in its historic use as a footpath for the overland transport of canoes across the divide separating the Great Lakes Basin from the Canadian northwest.
