= Ralph Benjamin Pratt =

Canadian architect

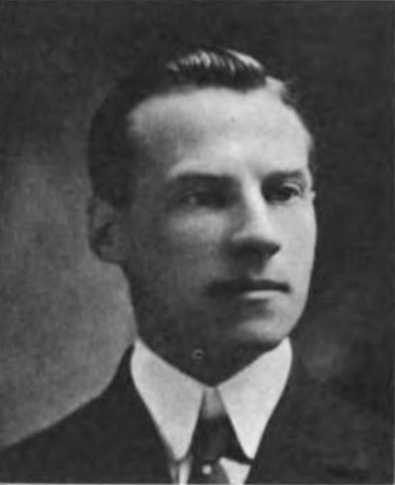
- Born: 9 August 1872; London, England
- Died: 14 March 1950 (aged 77); Saint Boniface, Winnipeg, Manitoba
- Occupation: Architect

Ralph Benjamin Pratt (9 August 1872 – 14 March 1950) was a Canadian architect known for his work as a staff architect for the Canadian Pacific Railway and the Canadian Northern Railway, and for his work as a member of the firm Pratt and Ross with partner architect Donald Aynsley Ross.

== Biography ==
Ralph Benjamin Pratt was born on 9 August 1872 in London, England to Joseph and Jane Pratt. He attended school at the South Kensington School of Art and moved to Canada in 1891 and then to Manitoba the following year.

Pratt worked at the Canadian Pacific Railway at Winnipeg as an architectural and engineering draftsman from 1895 to 1901, during which he created a standard plan for a station which was used at Virden, Manitoba, and other locations. From 1901 to 1906, he worked for the Canadian Northern Railway. He created the first standard design 3rd Class station for the Canadian Northern in 1901, and other standard plans. Although Pratt left the Canadian Pacific in 1901, and the Canadian Northern in 1906, he continued to receive commissions from the railroads for other work, and both railroads continued to use the standard plans he had created, so the design of later stations is often attributed to him.

In 1906, Pratt partnered with Donald Aynsley Ross to start the architectural partnership Pratt and Ross, which specialized in structural and civil engineering projects. Pratt was a Fellow of the Royal Architectural Institute of Canada, a member of the Railway Engineering Association, and was the president of the Manitoba Association of Architects from 1917 to 1919.

Pratt married Euphemia Maude Monnington (1874–1977) on 23 October 1900, at Winnipeg, and they had three children. His recreations included canoeing and skating. He was a member of the Anglican church.

He died at Saint Boniface, Winnipeg, on 14 March 1950, and was buried in the St. John's Cemetery.

== Works ==
Some of Pratt's works include:

- Canadian Pacific station, Kenora, Ontario, 1899
- Canadian Pacific station, Virden, Manitoba, 1900, Type 9 Canadian Pacific Railway Station design
- Canadian Northern station, St Boniface, Manitoba, 1901
- Broad Street station, Ottawa, 1901
- Theodore railway station, Theodore, Saskatchewan, 1902, Type 9 Canadian Pacific Railway Station design
- Canadian Pacific station, Kenton, Manitoba, 1902
- Canadian Northern station, Neepawa, Manitoba, 1902
- Canadian Pacific station, Carberry, Manitoba, 1904
- Canadian Pacific station, Portage la Prairie, Manitoba, 1904
- Canadian Northern station, Port Arthur, Ontario, 1905
- Canadian Northern Station, Silver Mountain, Ontario, 1907
- Canadian Northern station, Kipling, Saskatchewan, 1909
- Winnipeg Amphitheater, Winnipeg, Manitoba, 1909
- Garry Block, Winnipeg, Manitoba, 1911
- Dauphin railway station, Dauphin, Manitoba, 1912
- Prince Edward Hotel, Brandon, Manitoba, 1912, a Canadian National Railway hotel
- Canadian Northern Station, Smiths Falls, Ontario, 1913, 1st Class CNR station (attributed to Pratt)
- Radville railway station, Radville, Saskatchewan, 1912, Plan 100–39, 2nd Class CNR railway station
- Canadian Northern Station, Meeting Creek, Alberta, 1912, Plan 100–29, 3rd Class CNR railway station
- Electric Railway Chambers, Winnipeg, Manitoba, 1912, Pratt and Ross supervising architects
- Pacific Central Station, Vancouver, British Columbia, 1918
- Sherbrook Pool, Winnipeg, Manitoba, 1930
- Osborne Stadium, Winnipeg, Manitoba, 1932
- Canadian Northern station, Edmonton, Alberta

== Gallery ==
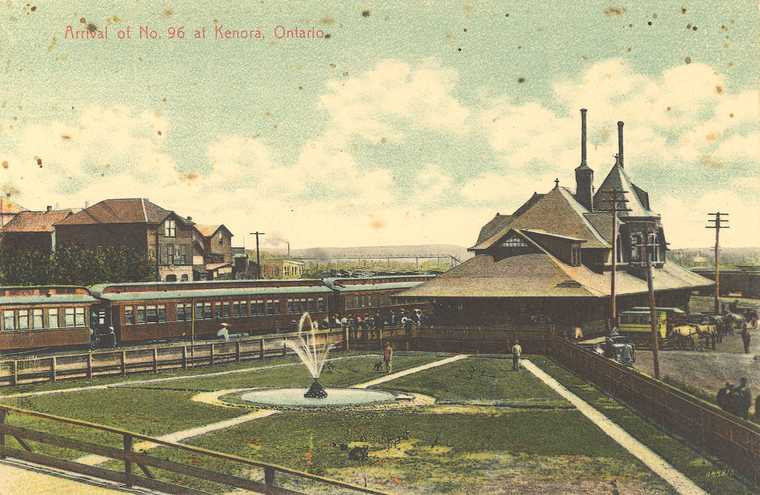
Canadian Pacific station, Kenora

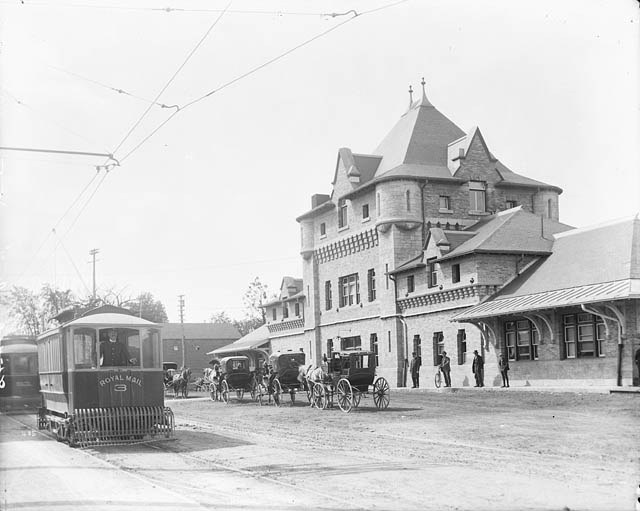
Broad Street Station, Ottawa

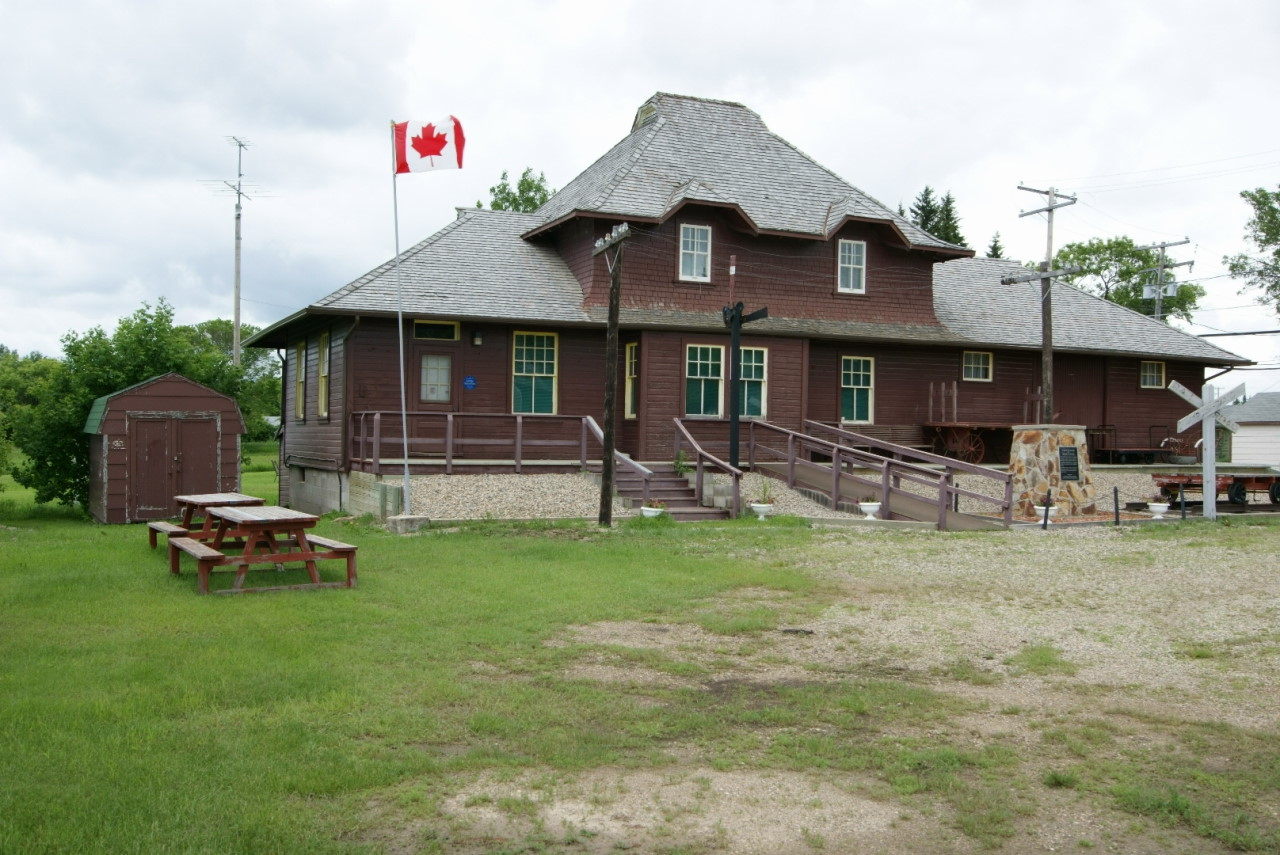
Theodore station

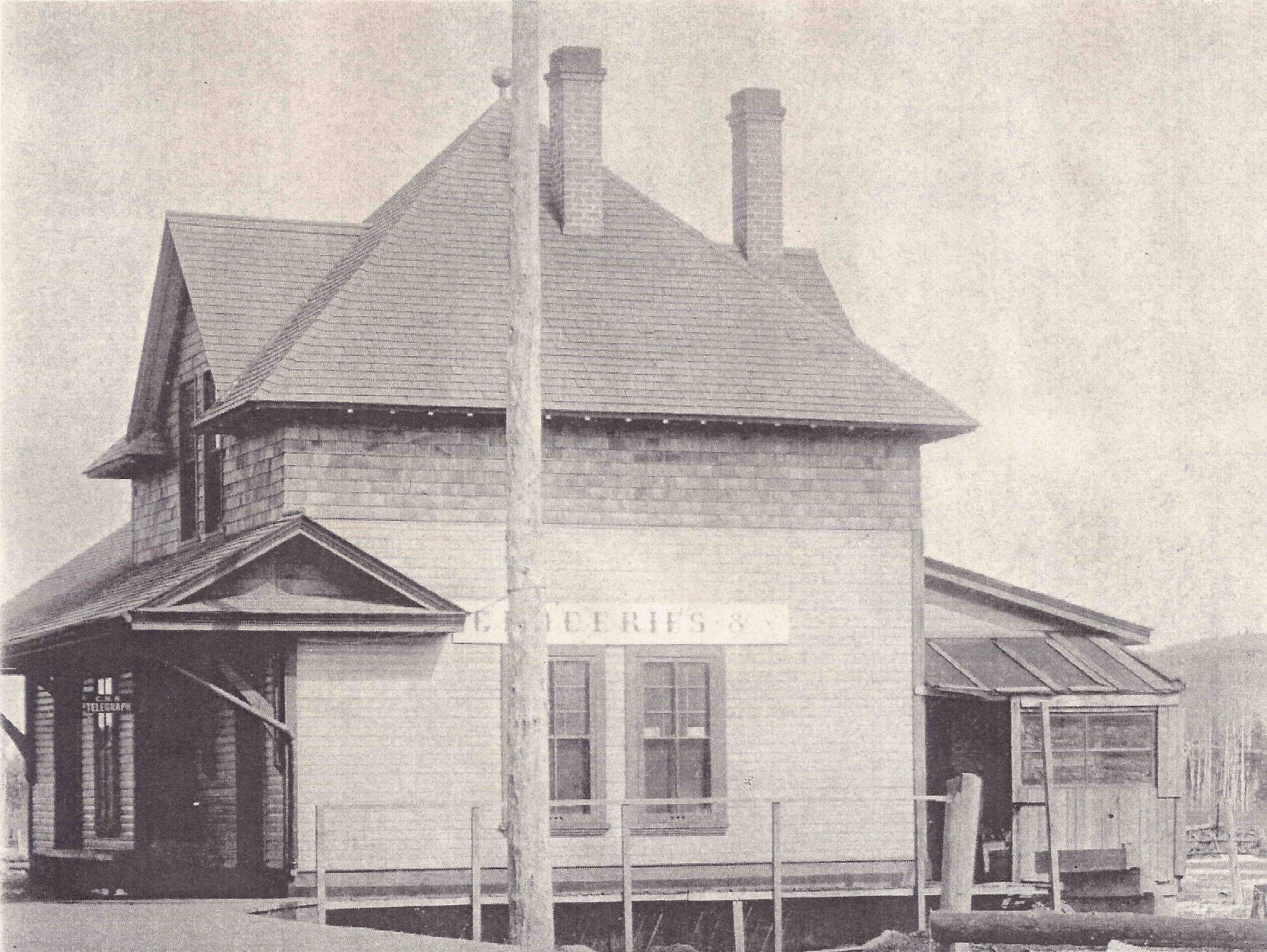
Silver Mountain station

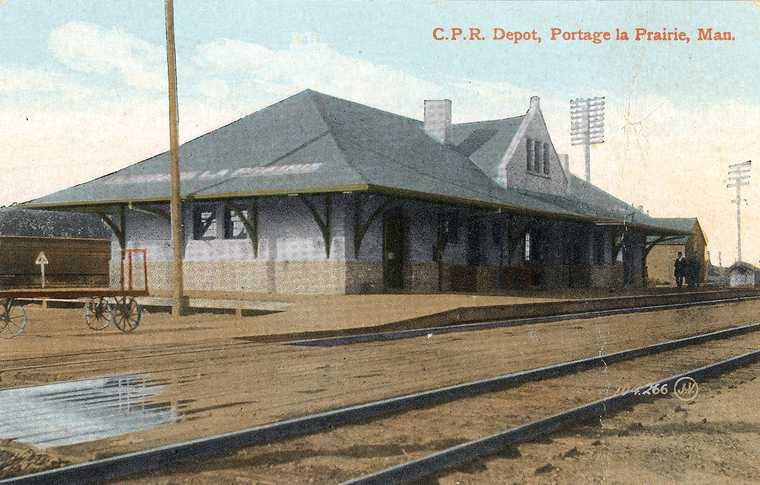
Canadian Pacific station, Portage la Prairie

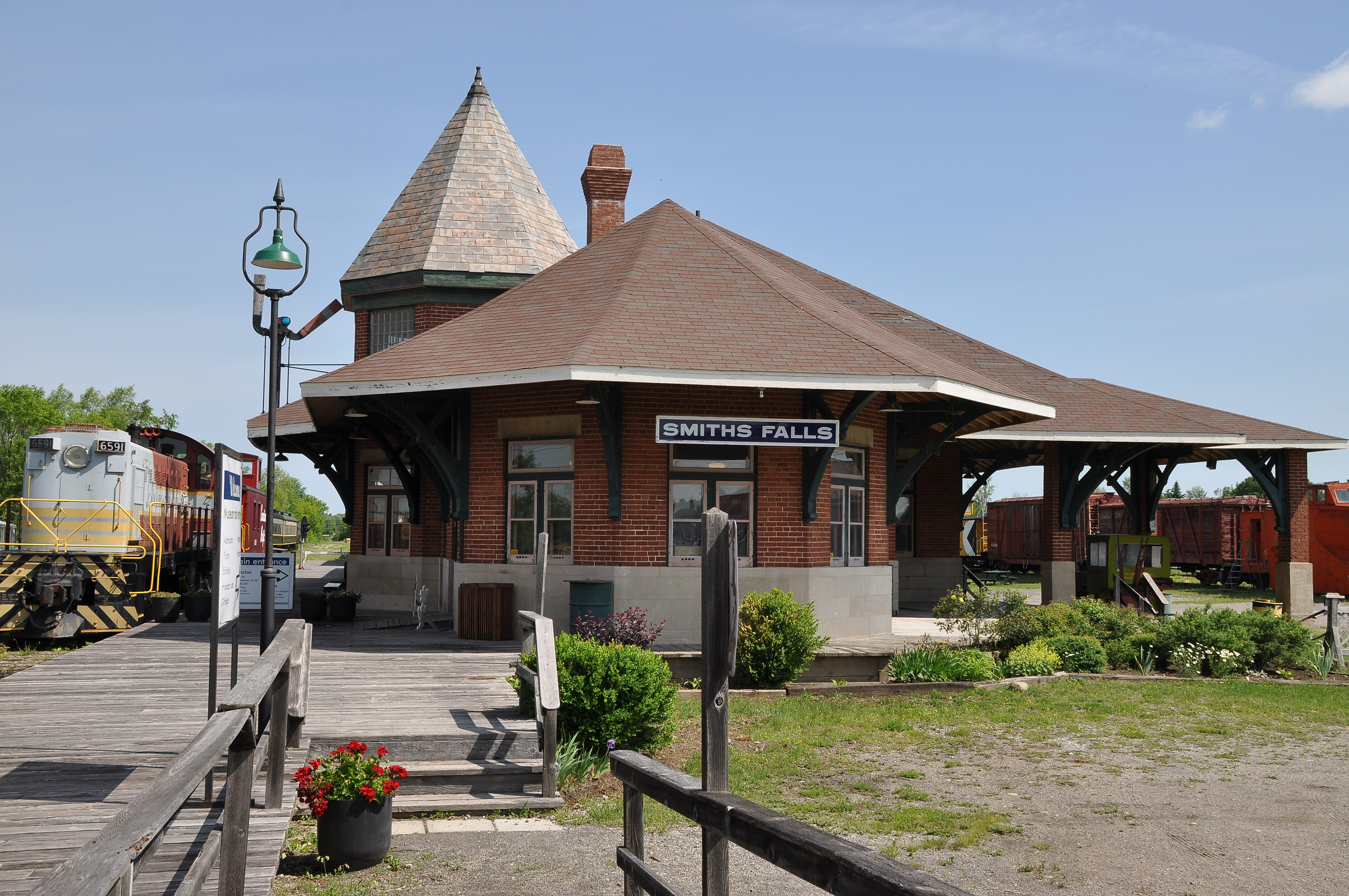
Canadian Northern station, Smiths Falls

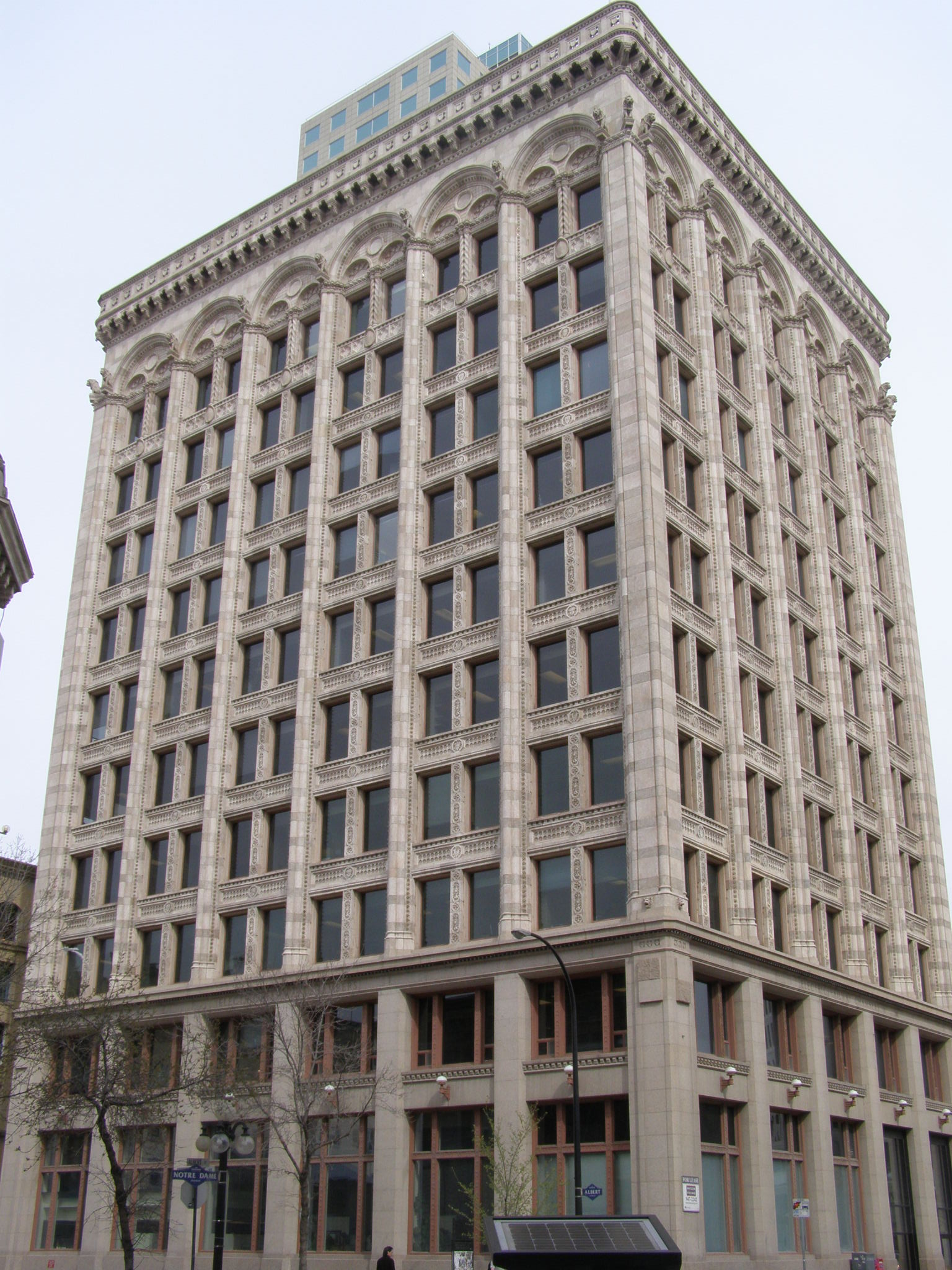
Electric Railway Chambers, Winnipeg

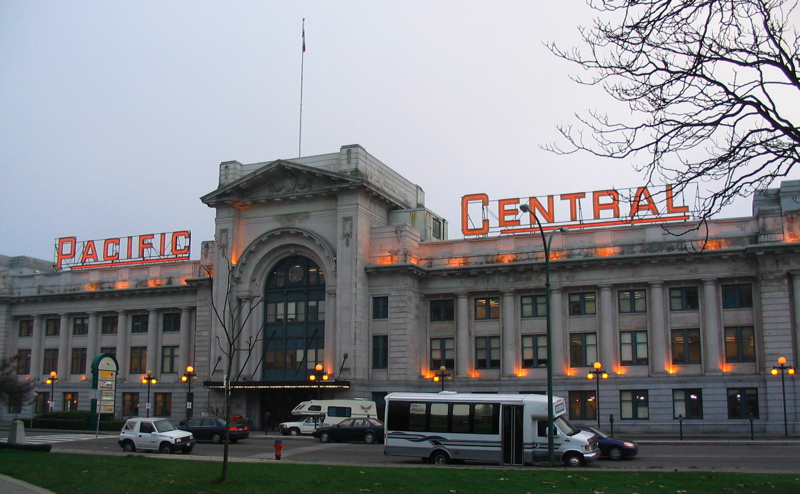
Pacific Central Station, Vancouver

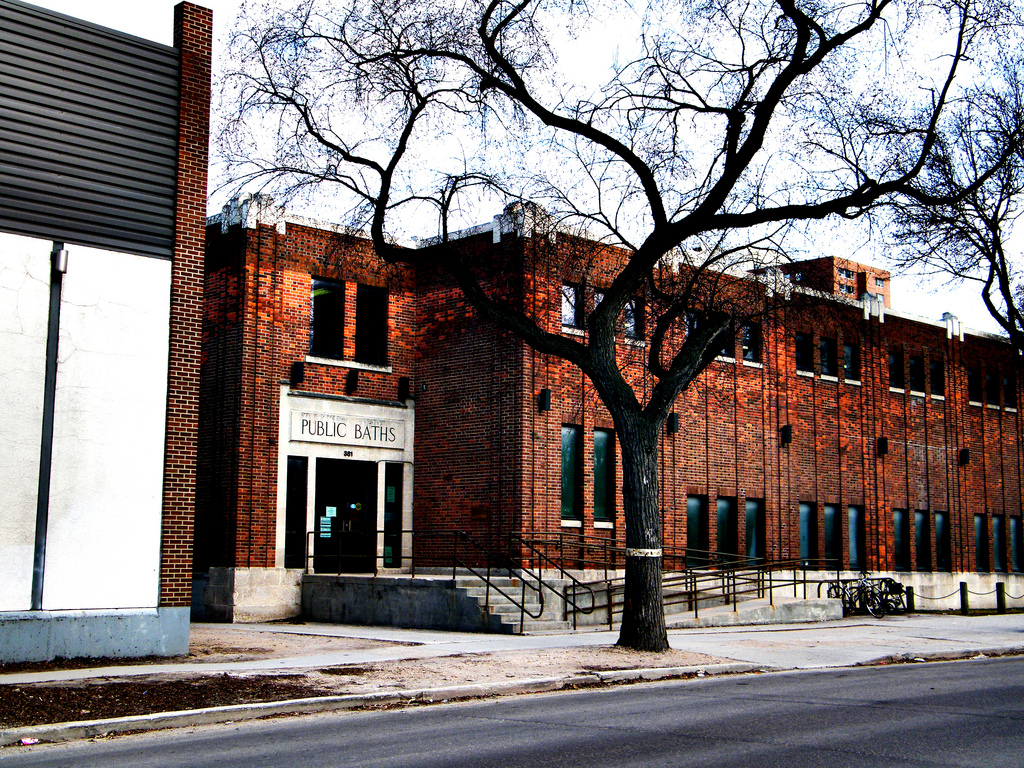
Sherbrook Pool, Winnipeg
