= Gunflint and Lake Superior Railroad =

Railway line in Canada and the United States

Overview
- Headquarters: Officially Duluth, Minnesota but operationally Port Arthur, Ontario
- Reporting mark: G&LS
- Locale: Ontario Minnesota
- Dates of operation: 1902–1909

Technical
- Track gauge: 4 ft 8 1/2 in (1,435 mm) standard gauge
- Length: 6 mi (10 km)

The Gunflint and Lake Superior Railroad (G&LS) is a defunct Minnesota logging railroad that operated in the Thunder Bay District of northwestern Ontario and in Cook County of northeastern Minnesota.

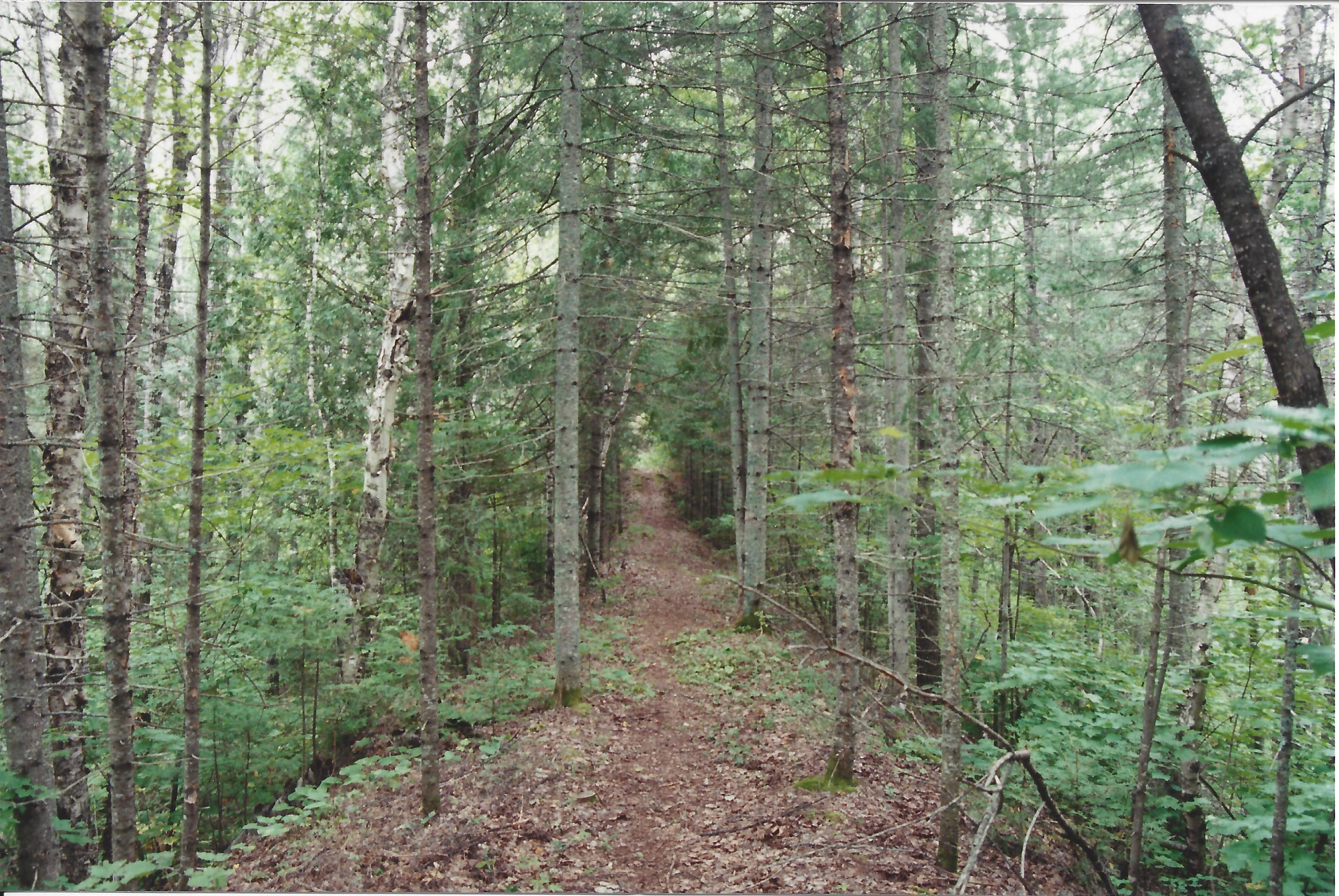
Former corduroy log trestle alongside Bridal Falls on Gunflint Lake, photographed in August, 1997.

The G&LS was built in 1902 by the Pigeon River Lumber Company to harvest primarily white pine and norway pine from the eastern side of Gunflint Lake. The logs were then transported to the company's sawmill in Port Arthur to be processed.

The line originated at the Canadian Northern Railway-Duluth Extension (PAD&W Railway) at Little Gunflint Lake, crossed the Canada–United States border, travelled along the east side of Gunflint Lake south to Crab Lake, and then east to Whisker Lake. This line was used until 1909 when it was abandoned and a forest fire destroyed a 1000-foot trestle on the PAD&W at North Lake and severed the line. The rails were removed circa 1915-1916.

== Locomotives ==
Number	Builder	Type	Date	Works number	Notes
1	Baldwin Locomotive Works	4-4-0	April 1873	3242	Formerly Chicago, St. Paul, Minneapolis and Omaha Railway #28. Purchased by the G&LS in December 1903
2	Lima Locomotive Works	2-truck, 3-cylinder Class B Shay	December 1901	683	Purchased from the Alexander-Edgar Lumber Company (Iron River, Wisconsin) in May 1905.
