= Dorothea Mitchell =

Canadian filmmaker and screenwriter (1877–1976)

Dorothea Mitchell (1877–1976), also known as Lady Lumberjack, was a pioneer filmmaker in Canada. Mitchell co-founded the first amateur film group in Canada, the Port Arthur Amateur Cinema Society, in 1929, and made three feature-length films: A Race For Ties (1929), Sleep Inn Beauty (1929), and The Fatal Flower (1930 but left unfinished). The society's first film, A Race For Ties, has the distinction of being the first amateur feature length film in Canada.

Mitchell was also the first single woman granted a homestead in the province of Ontario in 1911, served as station master at Silver Mountain Station, and ran a sawmill, which earned her her nickname. She published an autobiography, Lady Lumberjack, in 1968. Lady Lumberjack and other works written by Mitchell were republished in an annotated collection in 2005.

== Early life ==
Dorothea Mitchell was born in England in 1877. The family, including her younger sister Vera, moved from England to Bombay (now Mumbai), India, for her father's work in establishing railroads throughout the British Empire. Dorothea and Vera were educated as colonial elite in India and were taught etiquette and dancing, as well as other pursuits. Mitchell's mother also encouraged her daughters to learn some traditionally masculine skills as well, such as carpentry, riding, and marksmanship. Shortly after the family returned to England in the 1890s, Dorothea's father died. The family's upper class status in India reverted to middle class in England, and Dorothea began working various jobs to support her mother and younger sister.

== Biography ==
Mitchell emigrated to Canada on her own in 1904 for employment opportunities, first landing in Halifax, Nova Scotia. She worked various jobs, among them teaching dancing and swimming lessons, while waiting for her mother and sister to join her in Hamilton, Ontario, part of the Greater Toronto Area. When illness delayed her mother and sister's arrival to Canada, Mitchell left Hamilton to work for a mining engineer in Silver Mountain, Ontario, in 1909. Although the job's tenure was brief due to the economic decline in the silver mining industry, Mitchell remained in the region and began working for the Canadian National Railway (CNR) as a station master, and also operated the general store. Realizing the value of lumber, Mitchell purchased a sawmill and hired workers, earning her nickname of "Lady Lumberjack". The nickname is suitable for Mitchell according to those who knew her; they describe her as proper and ladylike, yet independent and fearless at the same time. For example, when cheated out of $130 in her sawmill business, she single-handedly took the perpetrator to court and won, eventually using the story of a crooked timber dealer as inspiration when writing her first film, A Race For Ties.

Unmarried women were not ordinarily entitled to a free grant, but Mitchell was granted homestead in 1907, although she was permitted only 79 acres, less than half of what men were typically given. She was the first single woman granted homestead in the province of Ontario. Mitchell lived in a bungalow on the property with her mother and sister, who had finally arrived to Canada from England.

Mitchell remained spirited and determined in her various interests throughout her life. In her autobiography, she recounts her foray into photography, stating "After I traded an old cook stove for a camera, I became renowned for my photography instead of my dresses." Her interest in film, as well as various other endeavours including writing, assisted her later in her filmmaking.

== Film career ==
Mitchell moved to Port Arthur, Ontario (now part of Thunder Bay) in 1921, joining her mother and sister, who had moved there the previous year. Again, Mitchell worked various jobs such as teacher and accountant, through which she met Fred Cooper, a local bakery owner. Mitchell's local reputation as a proficient photographer and ardent writer (involved in local newspapers and theatres) made her a perfect partner for the aspiring filmmaker Cooper, and together they co-founded the Port Arthur Amateur Cinema Society (PAACS) in February 1929. The society has the distinction of being the first amateur film group in Canada, and their first film, A Race For Ties, is the first Canadian feature-length film by non-professionals.

=== A Race For Ties (1929) ===
Mitchell put her varied experiences to use, serving as actor, production manager, editor, casting director, and writer for A Race For Ties. As writer, Mitchell was inspired by her own experiences, telling a story of a small sawmill owner competing against a large timber company to win a railway tie contract. In her autobiography, Lady Lumberjack, Mitchell recounts her involvement with the Cinema Society, stating "[A Race For Ties] was based on a timber deal I had myself experienced in the adjacent bush country, but of course making a young girl the heroine. As the author, I was privileged to choose the cast, and, with the Photographer and Director, became a charter member of the Amateur Cinema Society of Thunder Bay."

The film debuted at Thunder Bay's Lyceum Theatre in May 1929. The three-night event was incredibly popular. Some four hundred people had to be turned away because maximum capacity had been reached. Mitchell recalls the event as "a truly posh affair. Expressions of opinion were quite complimentary, perhaps the most extravagant coming from the manager of our biggest local movie house, the Colonial. He said our effort was definitely ahead of many of the early professional productions." The PAACS also showed their newsreel at the event. Although films in the 1920s were usually accompanied by introductory newsreels, the PAACS newsreel was the first to include the news of local Northwestern Ontario events, as well as national and international events.

=== Sleep Inn Beauty (1929) and The Fatal Flower (1930) ===
The PAACS's second feature-length film, Sleep Inn Beauty, was again produced, cast, and written by Mitchell, who adapted the scenario from a short story. In her autobiography, she recounts how the success of the first two films encouraged the PAACS to expand, renting an office and more equipment. However, in 1931 the Society was forced to close due to dwindling interest from members and accumulated bank debt from the filming of the uncompleted The Fatal Flower. The onset of the Great Depression, as well as the introduction of sound film to cinema, also contributed to the Society's closure.

=== The Fatal Flower Project (2004) ===
In 2004, a small group of film historians, filmmakers, writers, and artists in Thunder Bay endeavoured to finish Mitchell's last film, The Fatal Flower. Led by local filmmaker Kelly Saxberg, the members of "The Fatal Flower Project" became familiar with Mitchell through archival footage, as well as her autobiography and previous films, and proceeded to finish the silent film, editing the raw footage and adding a plot, inter-title cards, and accompanying music. The film previewed at Thunder Bay's historic Finnish Labour Temple.

== Later life ==
In 1930, Mitchell became the first secretary-treasurer for the new Port Arthur General Hospital. After the closure of the Port Arthur Amateur Cinema Society in 1931, Mitchell's mother and sister died and Mitchell, although no longer having to support her dependents, took over a real estate and accounting business in Port Arthur. Mitchell was also involved in St. John's Anglican Church and the Imperial Order Daughters of the Empire in Port Arthur. In 1939, at the age of 63, Mitchell enlisted in the Red Cross Society and worked in the transportation corps and the office of Voluntary Registration of Canadian women at the onset of World War II. She continued working for the military, helping the dependents of servicemen as well as aiding British orphans until she retired to the West Coast in 1941, settling down in Victoria, British Columbia. In Victoria, she became involved once again in amateur filmmaking, joining the Victoria Amateur Movie Club, as well as joining the Victoria Branch of the Canadian Authors Association as secretary. In 1968, at the age of 91, Mitchell published a book of autobiographical short stories, entitled Lady Lumberjack. Mitchell died in Victoria in 1976, at the age of 99.

== Legacy ==
The Silver Mountain and Area Historical Society is working towards designating a portion of Highway 593 as the Dorothea Mitchell Memorial Highway.

In her review of Lady Lumberjack, the annotated collection of works edited by Michel S. Beaulieu and Ronald N. Harpelle, Cheryl Desroches states of Mitchell: "If she found living in the woods at times inconvenient, she would have laughed at the thought of herself as soft. Lady Lumberjack is laden with evidence of Mitchell's ability to defy notions, typical of the era, of appropriate female behaviour. [...] Mitchell's experiences fostered a strong belief that women were capable of anything men could do." The anthology "provide[s] a much-needed first-hand female perspective of the pioneer experience. Because she wrote about her extraordinary life in such matter-of-fact terms, however, her contributions to the feminist movement (and to literature more generally) has been overlooked in the broader historical record." Desroches praises Beaulieu and Harpelle's efforts to include Mitchell with the likes of Susanna Moodie and Catherine Parr Traill as an early advocate of women's rights.

== Filmography ==
- A Race for Ties, May 1929
- Sleep Inn Beauty, July 1929
- The Fatal Flower, May 1930

== Bibliography ==
- Beaulieu, Michael S. and Harpelle, Ronald N. The Lady Lumberjack: An Annotated Collection of Dorothea Mitchell's Writings. Thunder Bay, ON: Lakehead University Centre for Northern Studies, 2005.
- Forster, Merna and Payette, Julie. 100 More Canadian Heroines: Famous and Forgotten Faces. Toronto: Dundurn Group, 2011.
- Morris, Peter. Embattled Shadows: A History of Canadian Cinema, 1895–1939. Montreal, QC, and Kingston, ON: McGill-Queen's University Press, 1978.
- Tepperman, Charles. Amateur Cinema: The Rise of North American Moviemaking. Sacramento, CA: University of California Press, 2014.
