= Shea's Amphitheatre =

Former indoor arena in Manitoba, Canada

- Winnipeg Amphitheatre
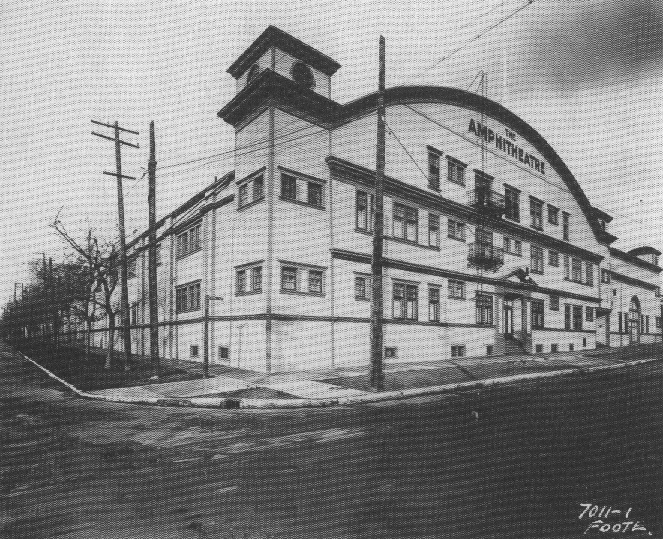
- Shea's Amphitheatre c.1923
- Interactive map of Shea's Amphitheatre
- Location: Winnipeg
- Coordinates: 49.8840°N 97.1511°W
- Capacity: 5,000 (1909-1914); 6,000 (1914-1955)
- Surface: artificial

Construction
- Built: 1908
- Opened: 1909
- Expanded: 1914
- Closed: 1955
- Architects: Ralph B. Pratt and Donald A. Ross

Tenant
- Winnipeg Maroons

Shea's Amphitheatre, also known as the Winnipeg Amphitheatre, was an indoor arena located in Winnipeg, Manitoba, Canada. It seated 6,000 spectators.

Constructed between 1908 and 1909 for horse shows, the Amphitheatre was also used as an indoor ice rink during the winter, with an ice surface measuring 67 by 26 metres (220 ft × 86 ft). After a renovation in 1919 it was, for a time, the only artificial ice surface between Toronto and Vancouver.

Today, the headquarters of The Great-West Life Assurance Company occupy the site.

== Location ==
The Amphitheatre was situated on the northeast corner of Whitehall Avenue (subsequently renamed Osborne Place) and Colony Street, some distance west of Osborne Street. Neither Whitehall Avenue nor Osborne Place exists today, although a stretch remains in use as a driveway at Balmoral Street, marked in the sidewalk by its newer name. It was an east–west street connecting Colony with Osborne and running parallel to Mostyn Place. At the north end of the amphitheatre was another east–west street that no longer exists: Brydges Avenue. North of Brydges and south of Broadway was Shea's Brewery.

According to archives of the Granite Curling Club:

A massive wooden structure, the Amphitheatre doubled as the arena for summer horse shows and an exhibition hall, and as an indoor skating rink in the winter. Somewhat later, the property that is now the older Great West Life Building was for decades Osborne Stadium, until Winnipeg Stadium in St. James was built in the mid-1950s. The area, therefore, formed a disjointed sports complex, with good access to the street-car lines and considerable public profile...

== History ==
Constructed between 1908 and 1909 for the Winnipeg Horse Show Company's horse shows, the Amphitheatre was designed by Winnipeg architects Ralph Benjamin Pratt and Donald Aynsley Ross. By 1910, it was also used as an indoor ice rink for skating and hockey, with an ice surface measuring 67 by 26 metres (220 ft × 86 ft).

After doubling its seating capacity to around 6,000 in 1914, it became the major venue for hockey games in Winnipeg.

It hosted the Memorial Cup tournament numerous times, the last of which was in 1953. Junior championship games were also held at the Amphitheatre, drawing in local teams like the Elmwood Millionaires, St. Boniface Seals, Portage Terriers, and the Brandon Wheat Kings.

For several years, it was also the venue of the Shrine Circus. Big-name celebrities also visited the Amphitheatre, such as Bob Hope in 1952.

In 1943, Winnipeg City Council members flagged fire safety concerns with the building, citing overcrowding as the main issue. Alderman Scott called the Amphitheatre "one of the most flammable buildings in Winnipeg."

The Amphitheatre was made redundant by the construction of the Winnipeg Arena in 1955 and was demolished the summer after, hosting its last event on May 31. The artificial ice plant was purchased by the owners of the Winnipeg Warriors and relocated to Winnipeg's Olympic Rink.

Currently occupying the site is the headquarters of Canada Life (then Great West Life Assurance Company), built between 1958 and 1959 and designed by Toronto architects Marani and Morris and the Winnipeg firm of Moody Moore and Partners.
