= Meeting Creek =

Hamlet in Alberta, Canada

- Hamlet
- Location of Meeting Creek Meeting Creek (Canada)
- Coordinates: 52°40′55″N 112°43′54″W
- Country: Canada
- Province: Alberta
- Region: Central Alberta
- Census division: 10
- Municipal district: Camrose County

Government
  - Type: Unincorporated
  - Governing body: Camrose County Council

Area (2021)
  - Land: 0.54 km^{2} (0.21 sq mi)

Population (2021)
  - Total: 12
  - Density: 0/km^{2} (0/sq mi)
- Time zone: UTC−06:00 (Alberta Time)
- Area codes: 780, 587, 825

Meeting Creek is a hamlet in central Alberta, Canada within Camrose County, 1 kilometre (0.62 mi) west of Highway 56, approximately 38 kilometres (24 mi) south of Camrose.

== Toponymy ==
Meeting Creek is named after a nearby eponymous stream. The creek received this name because Cree and Blackfoot people often crossed paths there while hunting buffalo. In the Cree language, the stream and hamlet are known as Nakiskotato Sîpîsis ("Unexpected Meeting Creek").

== History ==
=== Pre-settlement ===
The oral history of the Cree and Blackfoot peoples provides that Meeting Creek served as an area for both societies to meet, trade, and hunt. In 1793, Peter Fidler, a surveyor who charted the area in the late 18th century, encountered a group of Kainai people in the present-day site of Meeting Creek. An archaeological survey in 1977 identified several tipi rings in the valley of Meeting Creek.

=== Founding: 1903–1913 ===
At the turn of the 20th century, two settlements operated in the area that is today known as Meeting Creek. In 1903, a post office operating under the name Edensville was opened in the vicinity. In 1905, another post office was opened nearby by Hans Ellefson, under the name Meeting Creek.

In 1910, the Canadian Northern Railway (CNR) began work on a train station in the area, to be named for the Edensville post office. When Ellefson died the next year, his postal operation relocated to the CNR's station. The two postal offices combined, and when the railway station was built in 1913, both the train stop and locality assumed the name of Meeting Creek. The station itself was designed by Ralph Benjamin Pratt.

Many early settlers were farmers from South Dakota, responding to advertisements by the federal government to buy land in Western Canada. A significant number of settlers were from Sweden. An Augustana Evangelical Lutheran Church was established in Meeting Creek by Swedish congregants in 1906.

=== Development: 1914–1981 ===
Meeting Creek's economy throughout much of the 20th century centred around dairy farming, with residents establishing a co-operative creamery that produced enough to serve surrounding localities. In earlier decades, farmers who struggled with their crops also traded muskrat pelts for groceries.

Meeting Creek's agricultural output remained steady into the 1920s. The locality became the site of several stores, a bank, a hotel, and three grain elevators. One of these was established by Alberta Pacific Grain in 1917. When the CNR merged with the Grand Trunk Pacific Railway in 1919, many smaller rail lines in Alberta closed, but the Camrose–Stettler line that contained Meeting Creek remained open due to steady shipments from the locality's farms.

On the evening of March 18, 1934, a meteor was observed in the sky above Alberta and Saskatchewan. The meteor passed over Meeting Creek before seeming to "burst" over nearby Ferintosh. It was most visible over Meeting Creek, with residents describing a "blinding flash," followed by houses shaking due to the "force of the explosion" overhead. Some Meeting Creek locals initially suspected an earthquake.

In January 1945, Meeting Creek local Corporal Walter Sven Westlund became one of the 13,654 Canadians to receive a military medal, which was awarded for acts of bravery or devotion under fire. Westlund earned the medal for his conduct in the Italian campaign of World War II.

By the 1960s farms in the Meeting Creek area had grown less reliant on the railway due to the establishment of highways in the area. Freight service to Meeting Creek subsequently ended in the latter half of the decade. Meeting Creek's hotel, built in 1910, was moved to the nearby settlement of Donalda in 1971, following the destruction of Donalda's hotel the previous year in a fire.

=== Hamlet: 1982–present ===
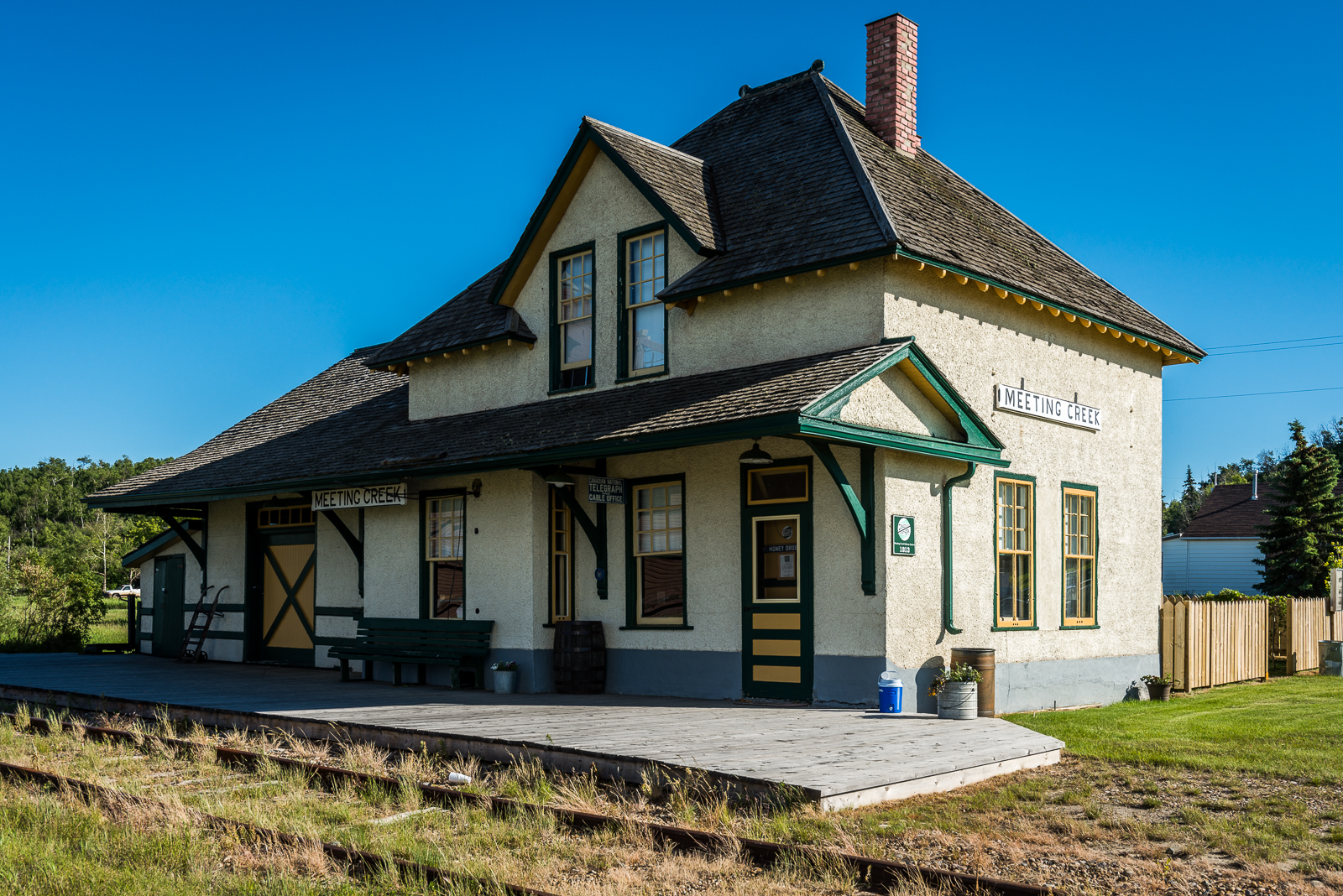
Meeting Creek's restored train station, pictured in 2016.

Meeting Creek was declared a hamlet by the Government of Alberta in 1982. Two years later, Meeting Creek's last active grain elevator, operated by Alberta Pacific Grain, closed down. The Canadian Northern Society, a charity that preserves historical CNR sites, assumed ownership of Meeting Creek's abandoned final grain elevator for preservation purposes in 1990. The society also received a portion of the original main line and elevator track in 1997, donated by the Central Western Railway after passenger rail services to the hamlet ended that year.

Meeting Creek's disused railway station, along with the hamlet's Alberta Pacific Grain Elevator, were designated as historic resources by the Government of Alberta in 2008. The Canadian Northern Society hosted a celebration for the station's 100th anniversary in 2013.

In August 2023 residents Terry and Faith Gabert donated 129 hectares of land surrounding the hamlet to the Nature Conservancy of Canada. The Gaberts, who had farmed in the area since 1974, gifted the land to create a nature conservation area.

== Demographics ==
Population history of Meeting Creek
Year	Pop.	±%
1941	108	—
1951	114	+5.6%
1956	105	−7.9%
1961	71	−32.4%
1966	75	+5.6%
1971	43	−42.7%
1976	37	−14.0%
1981	55	+48.6%
1986	33	−40.0%
1991	21	−36.4%
1996	32	+52.4%
2001	42	+31.2%
2006	23	−45.2%
2011	20	−13.0%
2016	39	+95.0%
2021	0	−100.0%
Source: Statistics Canada

The 2021 Canadian census conducted by Statistics Canada recorded Meeting Creek as having a population of 0 living in 3 of its 12 total private dwellings, a change of −100% from its 2016 population of 39. As of 2026, Camrose County reports that a "handful" of families live in Meeting Creek.

== Economy and services ==
=== Places of interest ===
As of 2025, Meeting Creek's restored railway station and grain elevator are open to tourists as places of historical interest. The abandoned train track has been repurposed into a linear park. Meeting Creek also contains an active Evangelical Free Church.

=== Internet access ===
The Government of Alberta announced in June 2024 that Meeting Creek will receive high-speed internet by March 2027, as one of the rural communities to benefit from a joint broadband initiative between the provincial and federal governments.

== See also ==
- List of communities in Alberta
- List of designated places in Alberta
- List of hamlets in Alberta
