= Pine River (Minnesota–Ontario) =

- Mouth of the river

Location
- Countries: Canada; United States
- Province: Ontario
- State: Minnesota

Physical characteristics
- Source: Fortune Lake
  - coordinates: 48°11′59″N 90°23′39″W
  - elevation: 513 m (1,683 ft)
- Mouth: Granite Lake
  - coordinates: 48°8′54″N 90°46′41″W
  - elevation: 448 m (1,470 ft)

Basin features
- River system: Winnipeg River

The Pine River flows along the Minnesota-Ontario border a short distance, primarily within the Boundary Waters Canoe Area Wilderness and La Verendrye Provincial Park. The river is part of the Winnipeg River drainage basin and is a tributary of the Granite River.

From its source at Fortune Lake, the river first flows in a southwest direction through Prelate Lake, Addie Lake, and North Lake before reaching Gunflint Lake. From here, the river then flows north into Magnetic Lake, Clove Lake, and Granite Lake, at which point it joins the Granite River. The Granite River then continues northward along the border into Saganaga Lake.

By portaging around rapids, the Pine River is navigable by canoe.

== See also ==
- List of rivers of Ontario
- List of rivers of Minnesota

== Notes and References ==
=== Sources ===
- Benke, Arthur C.; Cushing, Colbert E. (2005). Rivers of North America. New York: Elsevier. ISBN 978-0-12-088253-3.
