= Whitefish Lake (Thunder Bay District) =

Lake in Ontario, Canada

- Location within Canada
- Location: Thunder Bay District, Northwestern Ontario, Northern Ontario Canada
- Coordinates: 48.218°N 90.000°W
- Type: lake
- Surface area: 11.7 square miles (30 km^{2})
- Max. depth: 22 feet (7 m)

Whitefish Lake is located in the Thunder Bay District in Northwestern Ontario, Canada, near the village of Nolalu. The lake contains walleye, pike, and small mouth bass but is noted for its perch fishing. The average depth of Whitefish Lake is seven feet. Access to the lake is a public launch located on Highway 588 and many independent tourist resorts. Whitefish Lake is 11.7 square miles (30 km^{2}) and has a maximum depth of 22 feet (7 m). The lake drains into Lake Superior via the Little Whitefish River.
