= La Verendrye Provincial Park =

Provincial park in Ontario, Canada

- IUCN category II (national park)
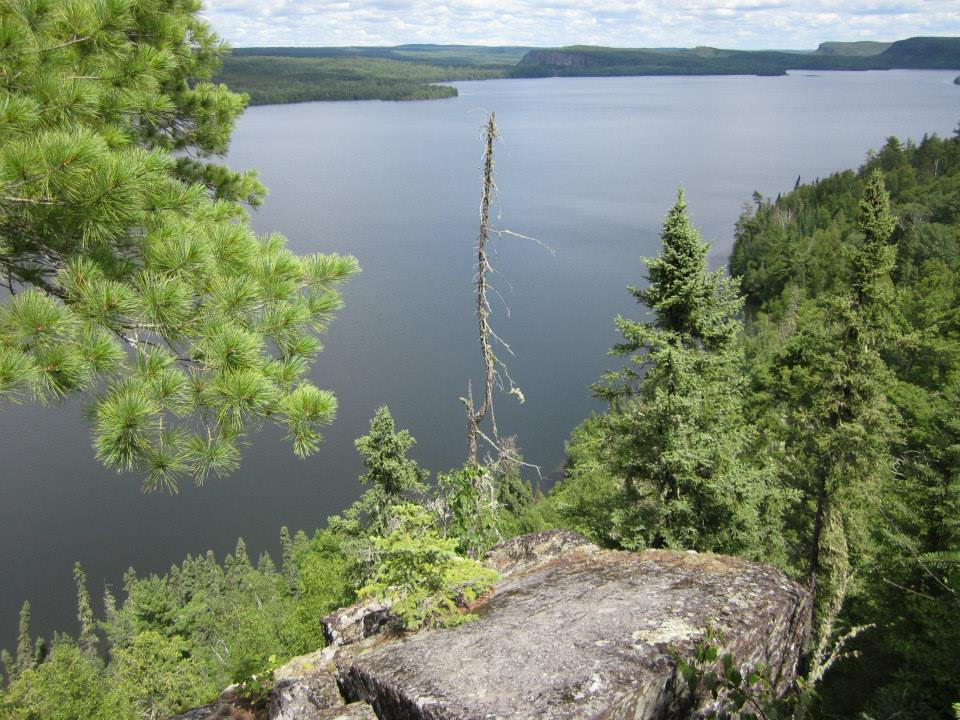
- Rose Lake, looking towards its north shore which is part of La Verendrye Provincial Park

- Location within Ontario
- Interactive map of La Verendrye Provincial Park
- Location: Thunder Bay District, Ontario, Canada
- Nearest city: Thunder Bay
- Coordinates: 48°05′49″N 90°22′40″W
- Area: 182.80 km^{2} (70.58 sq mi)
- Established: 1989
- Governing body: Ontario Parks
- Website: https://www.ontarioparks.ca/park/laverendrye

La Verendrye Provincial Park is a waterway provincial park located in Ontario, Canada, on the border with the U.S. state of Minnesota. The park stretches from Quetico Provincial Park through Saganaga Lake, up the Pine River, across the Height of Land Portage, then down the Pigeon River to Pigeon River Provincial Park on Lake Superior. The park is named after Pierre Gaultier de Varennes, sieur de La Vérendrye, an early explorer of Canada.

The park is a "non-operating" park, meaning no fees are charged and no staff is present with only a few services offered. As part of the international boundary, the portages, lakes, and waterways along the border are open to the citizens of both nations.

La Verendrye Provincial Park is part of the historic voyageur fur trade route from Lake Superior to Winnipeg, and features several scenic diabase-capped mesas, as well as several rare plant species.

== See also ==
- List of Ontario Parks
- Voyageurs National Park
- Boundary Waters
- Boundary Waters Canoe Area Wilderness
