= Boundary Waters–Canadian derecho =

Weather event

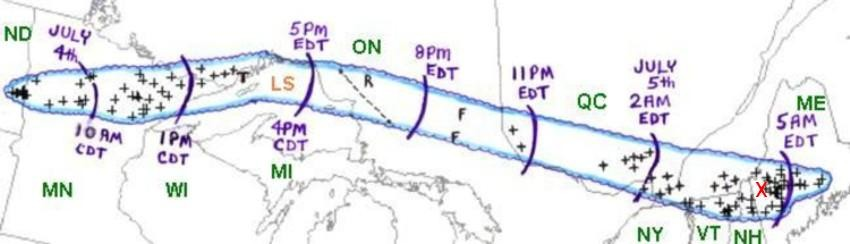
- Track of the Boundary Waters-Canadian Derecho (courtesy of NOAA)
- Duration: 22 hours
- Track length: 1,300 mi (2,090 km)
- Peak wind gust (measured): 90 mph (145 km/h; 40.2 m/s)
- Fatalities: 4
- Damage costs: >$100,000,000
- Areas affected: Northern United States, southern Canada

The Boundary Waters–Canadian Derecho (also called the Boundary Waters Blowdown) was an international derecho that occurred during the afternoon and evening hours of July 4 and the early morning hours of July 5, 1999. It traveled 1,300 miles (2,092 km) and lasted 22 hours.

== Storm path ==
=== North Dakota ===
In the pre-dawn hours of July 4, a band of thunderstorms developed over far eastern North Dakota. Hector International Airport in northwest Fargo recorded winds in excess of 58 mph (95 km/h) for 40 minutes and a maximum wind gust of 91 mph (146 km/h). Many planes were damaged or overturned. The hangars suffered damage as well.

The worst damage occurred farther south in West Fargo, North Dakota and in south central Fargo, North Dakota. Wind gusts in these areas were estimated at as high as 110 mph (180 km/h).

The storm caused $85 million in damage (1999 dollars) in the Fargo metropolitan area. Over 40,000 people were without power. Cars were overturned, roofs were severely damaged, and power poles were blown down.

=== Minnesota ===
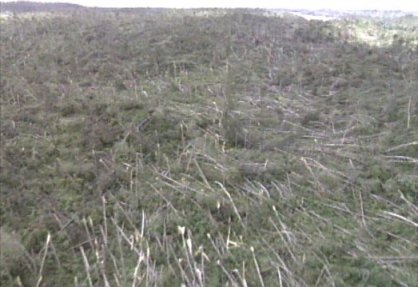
Damage to trees in the BWCAW

The derecho moved into Minnesota and caused massive damage in Cass, Itasca, and Aitkin Counties, at around $3 million. A semi-trailer truck was blown over on U.S. Route 53 near Canyon.

One person was killed and 60 were injured as the derecho passed through the Boundary Waters Canoe Area Wilderness (BWCAW) and Superior National Forest. People were there to enjoy canoeing and other recreation for the Independence Day weekend. Straight line winds in excess of 90 mph (145 km/h) uprooted and snapped off trees in over 370,000 acres (1,500 km²) of the 1 million acre (4,000 km²) wilderness area. In total, more than 477,000 acres (1,930 km²) of forest was affected in the Superior National Forest in a swath 30 miles (48.3 km) long and 4 to 12 miles (6.4 to 19.3 km) wide. It is estimated that 25 million trees were blown down in the BWCAW.

=== Ontario ===
The derecho brought more damage when it crossed the border into Ontario during the early afternoon hours of July 4. At its peak near Thunder Bay, the winds were estimated to have been much stronger, around 100 mph (160 km/h) and it spawned some small tornadoes. One small sailboat was overturned and two people were thrown into the cold waters of Lake Superior. They were rescued by a nearby boater.

The storm carved a path of destruction into the sparsely populated forested areas of northern Ontario. The Canadian Pacific track between White River and Chapleau in northeastern Ontario was put out of service by fallen trees. Significant tree and property damage was recorded in Timmins.

=== Quebec ===
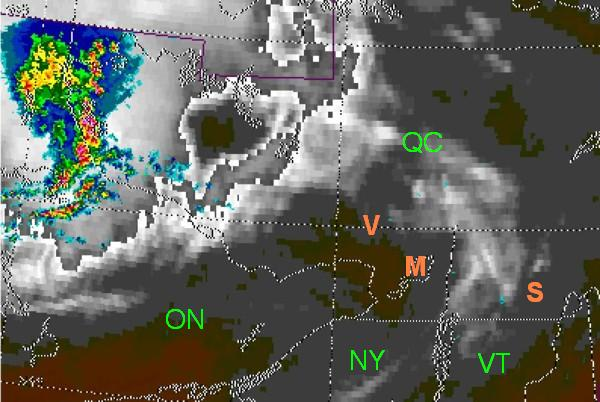
Radar and satellite image of the Derecho passing from Ontario (ON) to Quebec (QC)

As it raced eastward at 62 mph (100 km/h), the system entered into western Quebec in the Témiscamingue region around 11:00 p.m. A gust of 65 mph (102 km/h) was reported at the automatic station of Angliers. There was also a tremendous amount of lightning associated with this derecho, with around 6,000 lightning strikes per hour. Another person in this derecho was killed at Val-des-Lacs (V on the map) when a tree fell on the victim. A woman was injured when a tree crushed her car.

After narrowly missing the Ottawa area, the storm moved quickly into Montreal (M on the map) around 3:00 a.m. heading southeastward toward Maine. Much damage was recorded in the Metropolitan area but the worst affected area of Quebec was farther along its path near Sherbrooke (S on the map) in the Eastern Townships where a church was badly damaged, farm buildings were damaged and 2,000 trees were felled. Hydro-Québec reported that over 600,000 people lost power; some were without power for over a week.

=== New England ===
The storm continued southeast and caused more damage in New Hampshire and Vermont, killing one more person, before finally dissipating in Maine after 5:00 a.m. on July 5.

== Aftermath ==
The Boundary Waters – Canadian Derecho is one of the farthest north "progressive" derechos to have ever been recorded. The derecho caused well over $100 million in damage, killed 4 persons and injured 70. Over 700,000 homes and businesses lost power from the event.

== See also ==
- List of derecho events
