= Port Arthur, Duluth and Western Railway =

Railway in Northwestern Ontario

Overview
- Headquarters: Port Arthur, Ontario
- Reporting mark: PAD&W, PD&W
- Locale: Ontario Minnesota
- Dates of operation: 1889–1938

Technical
- Track gauge: 4 ft 8 1/2 in (1,435 mm) standard gauge
- Length: 146.85 km (91.25 mi)

The Port Arthur, Duluth and Western Railway (PADW) was a Canadian railway that operated in Northwestern Ontario.

The PADW was built in 1889 by investors interested in extracting the mineral and timber wealth of the Whitefish River Valley, Silver Mountain Range and beyond into the Gunflint Range.

The line originated at Port Arthur in the east, ran through Fort William and onward to the Canada–United States border. The PADW was constructed with the intention of connecting to an affiliated railroad in Minnesota to provide a route to Duluth, however this section was not built.

The PADW was abandoned in sections, and fully closed in 1938.

== See also ==
- Gunflint and Lake Superior Railroad
- Canadian Northern Railway
- List of Ontario railways
- List of defunct Canadian railways
