= Boundary Waters =

Boundary Waters Quetico-Superior Country
- Region
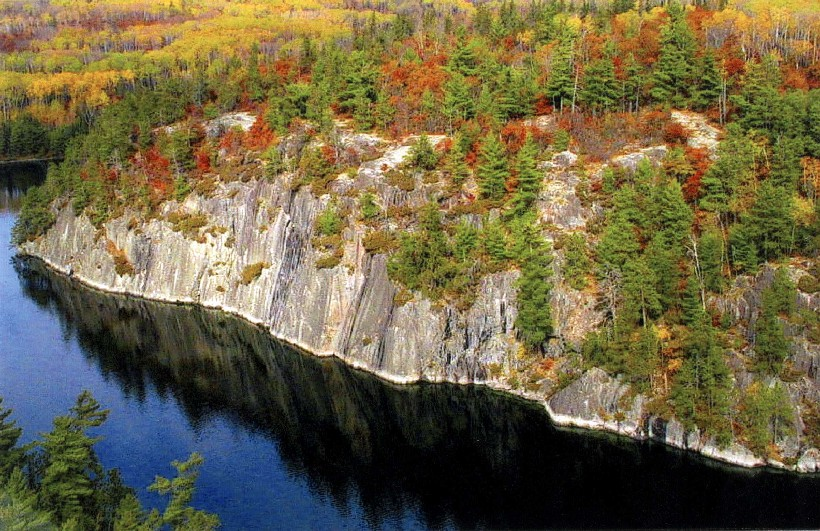
- A landscape typical of the Boundary Waters region (Voyageurs National Park, Minnesota)

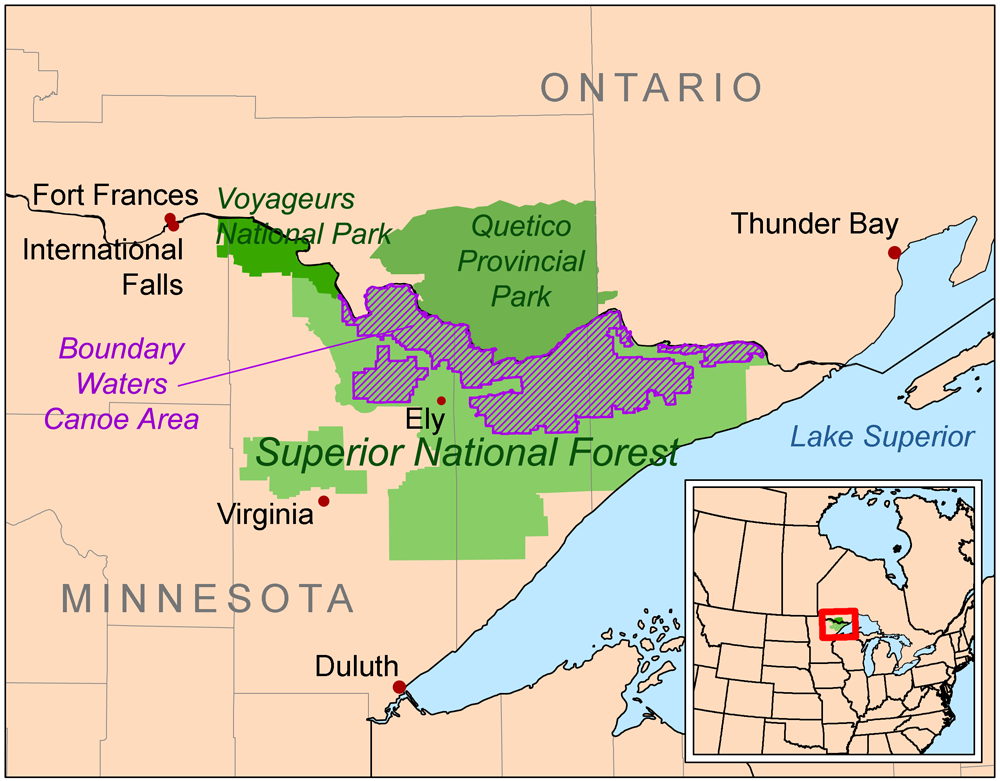
- Protected areas along the international boundary
- Coordinates: 48°06′00″N 91°37′12″W
- Country: Canada and United States
- State/Province: Ontario (CA) and Minnesota (US)

The Boundary Waters, also called the Quetico-Superior Country, is a region of wilderness straddling the Canada–United States border between Ontario and Minnesota, in the area just west of Lake Superior. While "Boundary Waters" is a common name for this region, the two nations also share extensive boundary waters along their border, beyond this region. This region is part of the Superior National Forest in northeastern Minnesota, and in Canada it includes La Verendrye and Quetico Provincial Parks in Ontario. Voyageurs National Park in Minnesota may also be considered part of the Boundary Waters. The name "Boundary Waters" is often used in the U.S. to refer specifically to the U.S. Wilderness Area protecting its southern extent, the Boundary Waters Canoe Area Wilderness.

The Boundary Waters region is characterized by a vast network of waterways and bogs within a glacially-carved landscape of Precambrian bedrock covered in thin soils and boreal forests. The Boundary Waters is a popular destination for recreationalists pursuing camping, canoeing, and fishing as well as for those simply looking for natural scenery and relaxation. The area is one of several distinct regions of Minnesota.

== Communities ==
The following communities are located anywhere from two to twenty miles from the boundary waters: Ely, Cook, Grand Marais, and Tofte in Minnesota and Atikokan in Ontario.

== Protected areas ==
Protected areas in the Boundary Waters region in Minnesota include Superior National Forest, Boundary Waters Canoe Area Wilderness, Voyageurs National Park and Grand Portage National Monument. Protected areas in Ontario include Quetico and La Verendrye provincial parks.

== See also ==
- International Boundary Waters Treaty
- Sigurd F. Olson
- Calvin Rutstrum
- Proposed Twin Metals mine (Ely, Minnesota)
