= Port Arthur, Ontario =

Former city in Ontario, Canada

Coordinates: 48.45°N 89.23°W

Port Arthur
- City
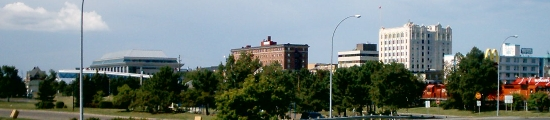
- Port Arthur skyline in 2006

- Coat of arms
- Interactive map of Port Arthur
- Country: Canada
- Province: Ontario
- Named (settlement): 1870
- Incorporated (city): 1907
- Amalgamated with Fort William to form Thunder Bay: 1970
- Named for: Prince Arthur, Duke of Connaught and Strathearn

Port Arthur was a city in Northern Ontario, Canada, located on Lake Superior. In January 1970, it was amalgamated with Fort William and the townships of Neebing and McIntyre to form the city of Thunder Bay.

Port Arthur became the district seat of Thunder Bay District with the appointment in June 1871 of Delevan Decatur Van Norman as the district's first stipendiary magistrate. It is historically notable as a temporary (1882–1885) eastern terminus of the Canadian Pacific Railway (CPR). It served as a major transshipment point for lakers that carried cargo to Port Arthur from across the Great Lakes. CPR's completion to the east did little to affect the city's importance for shipping; the Canadian Northern Railway was constructed to serve the port, and it built numerous grain silos to supply lakers. This rail and grain trade diminished in the latter half of the 20th century.

== History ==
Federal census population history of Port Arthur
Year	Pop.	±%
1881	1,275	—
1891	2,698	+111.6%
1901	3,214	+19.1%
1911	11,220	+249.1%
1921	14,886	+32.7%
1931	19,818	+33.1%
1941	24,426	+23.3%
1951	31,161	+27.6%
1956	38,136	+22.4%
1961	45,276	+18.7%
1966	48,340	+6.8%
Source: Statistics Canada

The government of the Province of Canada determined in the late 1850s to begin the exploration and settlement of Canada west of Lake Superior. With Confederation in 1867, Simon James Dawson was employed by the Canadian Department of Public Works (DPW) to construct a road and water route from Thunder Bay on Lake Superior to the Red River Colony (now Manitoba).

DPW's depot and settlement on the lake, where it landed and stored its supplies, acquired its first name in May 1870, just after a fierce forest fire had occurred. Colonel Garnet Wolseley, commander of the Red River expeditionary force, named the tiny fire-ravaged settlement as Prince Arthur's Landing, in honor of Prince Arthur, Duke of Connaught and Strathearn (1850–1942), son of Queen Victoria, who was then serving with his regiment in Montreal. In 1871 the Ontario government of Premier John Sandfield Macdonald surveyed the Prince Arthur's Landing Town Plot, thereby officially confirming the name and opening the land for legal possession. In May 1883 this unwieldy name was changed unilaterally by Canadian Pacific Railway (CPR) officials in Winnipeg to Port Arthur. The namesake prince did not visit the settlement until May 1890, when he and his entourage briefly stopped there.

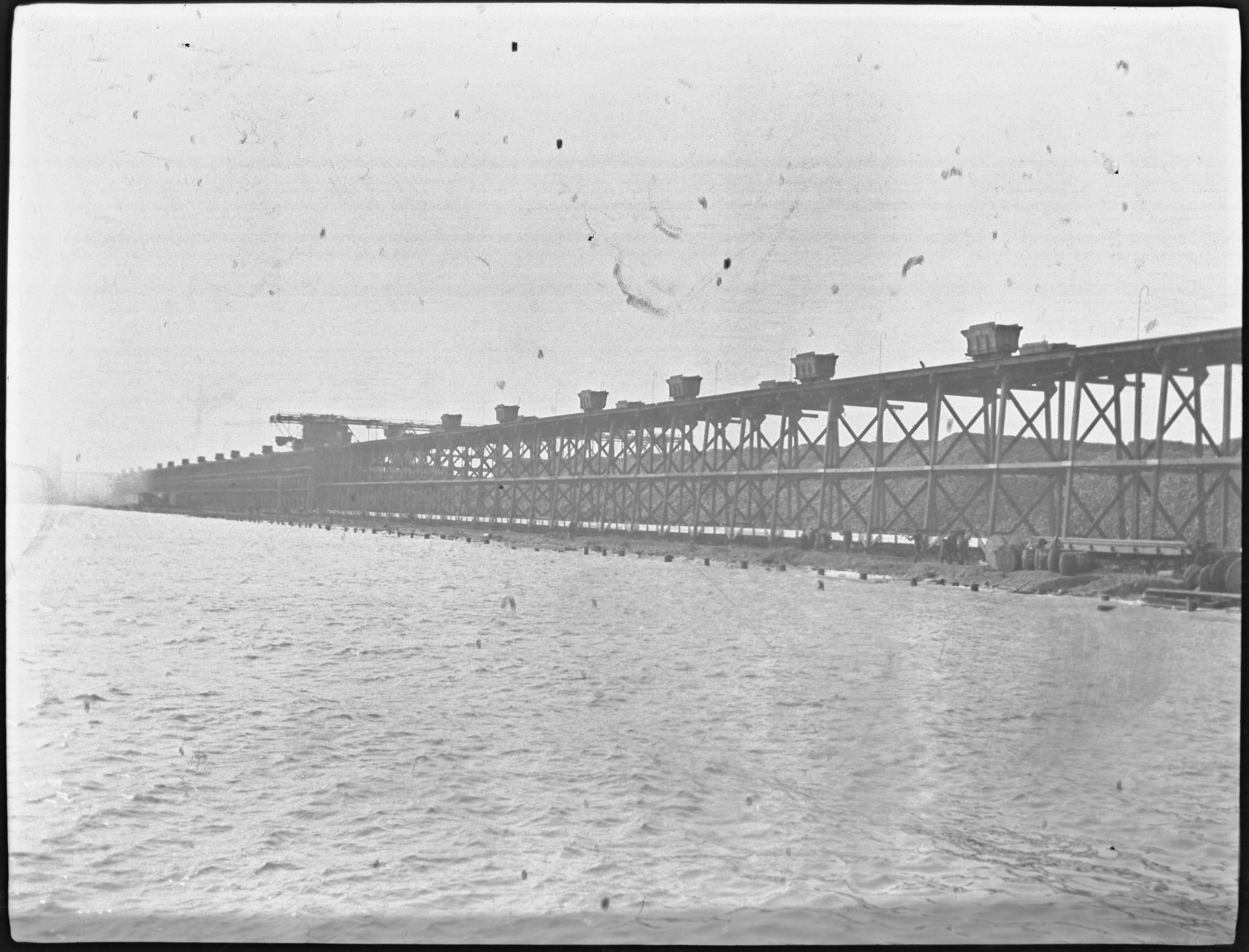
Canadian Northern Railway coal trestle in Port Arthur (1907)

The residents of Prince Arthur's Landing developed the Thunder Bay District's first municipality, the Municipality of Shuniah in March 1873. This early form of regional government covered an area that reached from Sibley Peninsula to the United States (US) border. The residents of Prince Arthur dominated Shuniah, which was resented by the few residents of Fort William, Ontario. In 1881, they established their own Municipality of Neebing. They began a long and ultimately successful competition with Port Arthur to secure all the operations of the Canadian Pacific Railway, which moved to Fort William later in the century.

Prospering from the CPR railway construction boom of 1882–1885, Port Arthur was incorporated as a town in March 1884. The CPR erected Thunder Bay's and western Canada's first terminal grain elevator on the bay in 1883, later leasing it to Joseph Goodwin King.

In the late 19th century, Port Arthur was greatly affected by changes in the economy. The CPR completed its construction along the north shore of Lake Superior and decided to centralize its operations along the lower Kaministiquia River. This abruptly reduced business in Port Arthur. In addition, silver mining had been the mainstay of the economy since the 1870s, but the boom in silver mining ended in October 1890. The U.S. Congress passed the McKinley Tariff, cutting off profitable exports to the US.

The town was in dire economic straits until 1897–1899, when the entrepreneurs William Mackenzie and Donald Mann acquired the Ontario and Rainy River Railway and the Port Arthur, Duluth and Western Railway. They chose Port Arthur as the Lake Superior headquarters for the Canadian Northern Railway. Port Arthur thrived as a transhipment and grain handling port for the CNoR after the railway line was opened through Rainy River District to Winnipeg, Manitoba in December 1901.

From 1871 onward, Port Arthur was designated as the administrative centre for Thunder Bay District (created 1871 by the Ontario government). A provincial stipendiary magistrate dispensed justice until 1884, when the government created a judicial district and appointed a federal judge to lead the court. The province erected a jail and court house in 1876, and located a Crown Lands Agent, a Crown Timber Agent, and an Inspector of Colonization Roads in the town. The federal Indian Agent was also usually located in the town. A large new courthouse was erected by the province in 1924.

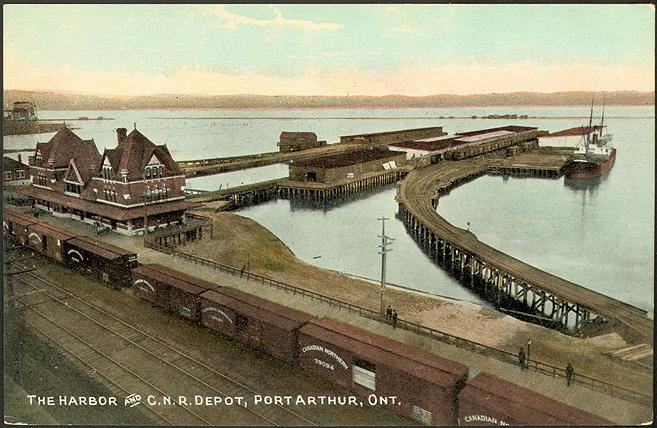
The Harbour and C.N.R. Depot, Port Arthur, Ontario in 1910

Attempts from 1901 to 1914 to secure manufacturing industries generally came to naught. But the Western Dry Dock and Shipbuilding Company, later called the Port Arthur Shipbuilding Company or PASCO, was a major industrial employer for many years.

The forest products industry was important to the town's economic life. In the 1880s, Herman Finger established the Pigeon River Lumber Company, but dissolved the company and moved his operations to The Pas by 1906. In 1917, two sawmills were added to the pulp and paper industry, with the establishment of the Port Arthur Pulp and Paper Company, later a division of Provincial Paper Mills Ltd, and in 1920 the Kaministiquia Pulp and Paper Company at Current River. This was sold in 1922 to the Consolidated Water Power and Paper Company of Wisconsin Rapids, Wisconsin.

The absorption of the Canadian Northern Railway into the Canadian National Railways meant the loss of many CNoR facilities. The Canadian Northern route through Port Arthur was downgraded by the new CNR. But western Canadian grain companies preferred to build their large new terminal grain elevators on Thunder Bay rather than on Fort William's Kaministiquia River.

Lakehead University was established on a site off Oliver Road within the former city of Port Arthur, overlooking the intercity area that increasingly became a focus of industrial and commercial activity in the post-World War II period.

Port Arthur became a city in April 1907. The City of Port Arthur ceased to exist at the end of December 1969.

== Prince Arthur's Landing waterfront district ==
In 2006, Prince Arthur's Landing was adopted as the name for a mixed-use waterfront redevelopment district incorporating a marina, parkland and trails, public art, restored heritage buildings, and a future hotel. Structures include the Baggage Building Arts Centre public gallery, a restored circa-1900 building, the Water Garden Pavilion, a skateboard park, running and cycling trails, as well as public art.

== Arms ==
In 1963 Port Arthur acquired a new coat of arms from the College of Arms in London. The original crest depicted a wooden fort with wide-open gate with the motto "Gateway to the West." The new coat of arms, designed by J.P. Brooke-Little, Bluemantle Pursuivant of Arms, featured a heraldic gateway in a framing sun, wavy bars representing water, blue fleurs de lys, a red cross, a lion holding a tree, a moose and a wolf.

Coat of arms of Port Arthur, Ontario

Crest
A lion passant Gules, its paw resting on a hurt charged with a saltire Argent, between two spruce trees Or on a mount Vert.
Escutcheon
Azure a gateway embattled irradiated, the portcullis raised Or, issuant from a base barry wavy of six Argent and Azure.
Supporters
Two moose proper each gorged with a collar Argent charged with a cross Gules between two fleurs-de-lis Azure, that to the dexter resting its hind leg on a garb fesswise Or, that to the sinister resting its hind leg on a salmon proper.
Motto
The Gateway To The West

== Notable people ==
- Richard Bocking, award-winning Canadian filmmaker
- Sheila Burnford, Scottish writer and novelist, wrote The Incredible Journey; resided for many years in Port Arthur after emigrating to Canada in 1951
- Mary Riter Hamilton, Canadian artist and painter
- Smokey Harris, ice hockey player noted for scoring the first ever goal in Boston Bruins history.
- Dorothea Mitchell, pioneering filmmaker and writer
- Fred Page, ice hockey executive and inductee into the Hockey Hall of Fame
- Frank Sargent, ice hockey executive and inductee into the Canadian Curling Hall of Fame
- H. J. Sterling, city councillor and ice hockey executive
- Joe Wirkkunen, Finnish-Canadian ice hockey coach

== See also ==
- List of mayors of Port Arthur, Ontario
- Fort William, Ontario
- Royal eponyms in Canada

== Bibliography ==
- Arthur, Elizabeth, 1920–. Thunder Bay district, 1821–1892 : a collection of documents. [Toronto]: Champlain Society for the Govt. of Ontario: University of Toronto Press, 1973. ISBN 0-8020-3281-8.
- Barr, Elinor, 1933–. Thunder Bay to Gunflint : the Port Arthur, Duluth & Western Railway. Thunder Bay, Ont. : Thunder Bay Historical Museum Society, 1999. ISBN 0-920119-36-0.
- Buonocore, S. P., 1955–. Catholic education on the northern frontier : the origins and early development of the Port Arthur Roman Catholic Separate School Board, 1870–1888. Thunder Bay, Ont. : S.P. Buonocore, 2002, c1992. ISBN 978-0-9730343-0-1; ISBN 978-0-9730343-1-8.
- Campbell, George. The town that arrested a train. Thunder Bay, Ont. : Guide Print and Pub., 1981. The 1889 seizure of a CPR freight train by the Town of Port Arthur for non-payment of municipal taxes.
- Mauro, Joseph M., 1931–. Thunder Bay : a history : the golden gateway of the Great Northwest. Thunder Bay, Ont. : Lehto Printers, 1981. Popular history without footnotes or sources.
- Morrison, Jean. Labour pains : Thunder Bay's working class in the wheat boom era. Thunder Bay, Ont. : Thunder Bay Historical Museum Society, 2009. ISBN 978-0-920119-56-3.
- Newell, Diane. "Silver mining in the Thunder Bay District 1865–1885," Thunder Bay Historical Museum Society, Papers and Records, XIII (1985), 28–45.
- Petersen, Bruce. "The great fire of 1870," Thunder Bay Historical Museum Society, Papers and Records, XII (1984), 8–18.
- Scollie, Frederick Brent. Thunder Bay mayors and councillors, 1873–1945 : including Port Arthur and Fort William, Ontario (1884–1945) and their predecessors, the municipalities of Shuniah (1873–1884) and Neebing (1881–1892) : a biographical and genealogical dictionary and electoral history. Thunder Bay, Ont. : Thunder Bay Historical Museum Society, 2000. ISBN 0-920119-40-9 (hardback) ISBN 0-920119-42-5 (CD-ROM)
- Scollie, Frederick Brent. Biographical dictionary and history of Victorian Thunder Bay (1850-1901) including Prince Arthur’s Landing, Port Arthur, Fort William, Neebing, Nipigon, McIntyre, Oliver, Paipoonge, Rossport, Savanne, Schreiber, Shuniah, and Silver Islet. Thunder Bay, Ont.: Thunder Bay Historical Museum Society, 2020. ISBN 978-0-920119-88-4.
- Scollie, Frederick Brent. "Theatre and music on Ontario's frontier 1876–1907 : town hall entertainment in Victorian Thunder Bay," Thunder Bay Historical Museum Society, Papers and Records, XXXVI (2008), 24–52.
- Thunder Bay from rivalry to unity / edited by Thorold J. Tronrud and A. Ernest Epp. Thunder Bay : Thunder Bay Historical Museum Society, 1995. ISBN 0-920119-22-0.
- Tronrud, Thorold John. Guardians of progress : boosters & boosterism in Thunder Bay, 1870–1914. Thunder Bay, Ont. : Thunder Bay Historical Museum Society, 1993. ISBN 0-920119-16-6.
- Young, J. E., Historical facts, grain elevator construction and shipping, Lakehead Harbour, 1883–1964 / prepared by J. E. Young, chairman, Lakehead Harbour Commission. [Port Arthur, Ont. : Lakehead Harbour Commission], 1965.
