= Sturgeon (disambiguation) =

Sturgeon are fish belonging to the family Acipenseridae.

Sturgeon may also refer to:

== Places ==
=== Canada ===
- Sturgeon (provincial electoral district), a former electoral district in Alberta
- Sturgeon County, a municipal district in Alberta
- Fort Sturgeon, an 18th-century trading post in what is now Saskatchewan

=== United States ===
- Sturgeon, Kentucky, an unincorporated community
- Sturgeon, Minnesota, an unincorporated community
- Sturgeon Township, St. Louis County, Minnesota
- Sturgeon, Missouri, a city
- Sturgeon, Pennsylvania, a census-designated place
- Sturgeons Bar, a bar in the Detroit River
- Sturgeon Bay, Wisconsin
- Sturgeon Creek (Michigan)
- Sturgeon Pool, a reservoir in New York state

=== Canada and the United States ===
- Sturgeon Lake (disambiguation)
- Sturgeon River (disambiguation)

== Military ==
- HMS Sturgeon
- Sturgeon-class destroyer, a Royal Navy class from 1894 to 1911
- USS Sturgeon
- Sturgeon-class submarine, a US Navy class of nuclear-powered fast attack submarines
- Short Sturgeon, a British aircraft originally designed as a Second World War reconnaissance bomber
- Short S.6 Sturgeon, a British prototype naval reconnaissance biplane
- Sturgeon, codename of messages encoded with the German World War II Siemens and Halske T52 teleprinter cypher machine

== Other uses ==
- Sturgeon (surname), a list of people with the name
- Fujian Sturgeons, a Chinese Basketball Association team
- Sturgeon Community Hospital, just north of Edmonton, Alberta, Canada
- Sturgeon House, a house in Fairview, Pennsylvania
- Sturgeons House, a Georgian house in Essex, England
- Sturgeon Moon, one of the names for a full moon in August

== See also ==
- Sturgeonism
- Sturgeon's law, an adage
- Spurgeon (disambiguation)
