= Sturgeon Lake =

Sturgeon Lake may refer to:

== Canada ==
- Sturgeon Lake (Alberta), a lake in Alberta, west of Valleyview
- Ontario
  - Sturgeon Lake (north Kenora District), a lake in northwestern Ontario, in northern Kenora District in the Hayes River watershed
  - Sturgeon Lake (Northwestern Ontario), a lake in northwestern Ontario, in eastern Kenora and north-western Thunder Bay Districts
  - Sturgeon Lake (Nipissing District), a lake in northeastern Ontario, in Nipissing District
  - Sturgeon Lake (Ontario), a lake in southern Ontario in the Kawartha Lakes region
  - Sturgeon Lake Caldera, a caldera in northwestern Ontario
  - Sturgeon Lake (Rainy River District), a lake of the Hunter Island region of Quetico Provincial Park, northwestern Ontario
- Sturgeon Lake (Saskatchewan), a lake northwest of Prince Albert, Saskatchewan

First Nations

- Sturgeon Lake First Nation, a First Nation whose territory borders the lake of the same name in Saskatchewan

== United States ==
- Sturgeon Lake (Michigan), a lake in Michigan on the St. Joseph River
- Sturgeon Lake, Minnesota, a city in Minnesota
- Sturgeon Lake (Goodhue County, Minnesota), a natural lake
- Sturgeon Lake (Oregon), a lake on Sauvie Island in Oregon

== See also ==
- Sturgeon
