= Sturgeon (surname) =

Sturgeon is a surname. Notable people with the surname include:

- Al Sturgeon (born 1956), American politician from Iowa
- Barbara Sturgeon, British broadcaster
- Bobby Sturgeon (1919–2007), American baseball infielder
- Cecil Sturgeon (1919–1972), American football offensive tackle
- Connor Sturgeon (1998–2023), American mass shooter
- Daniel Sturgeon (1789–1878), American physician, banker, and politician from Pennsylvania
- Fábio Sturgeon (born 1994), Portuguese footballer
- Henry Sturgeon (died 1814), British Army officer of the Napoleonic Wars
- Lyle Sturgeon (1914–1958), Canadian-born American football tackle
- Michael Sturgeon (born 1958), English cricketer
- Nicola Sturgeon (born 1970), Scottish politician and First Minister of Scotland from 2014 to 2023
- Peter Sturgeon (born 1954), Canadian ice hockey player
- Peter A. Sturgeon (1916–2005), American scholar
- Rollin S. Sturgeon (1877–1961), American silent film director
- Sallie Lewis Stephens Sturgeon (c. 1870–1955), American journalist, public health inspector, and social worker
- Scott Sturgeon (born 1976), American musician
- Sylvester Sturgeon (1886–1930), English cricketer
- Theodore Sturgeon (1918–1985), American science fiction author
- William Sturgeon (1783–1850), English physicist and inventor who made the first electromagnets

== See also ==
- Spurgeon (disambiguation) § People with the surname Spurgeon
