= Saganaga Lake =

Lake in the state of Minnesota, United States

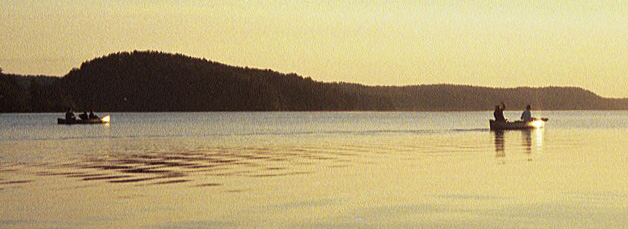
- Canoeists near Cache Bay

- Location within Minnesota Location within the United States Location within Ontario Location within Canada
- Location: Ontario / Minnesota
- Coordinates: 48°14′39″N 90°54′43″W
- Type: glacial lake
- Primary inflows: Saganaga Falls on the Granite River; Seagull River; Curran Bay from Northern Light Lake
- Primary outflows: Silver Falls in Cache Bay
- Basin countries: Canada, United States
- Surface area: 13,832 acres (5,598 ha)
- Max. depth: 280 ft (85 m)
- Surface elevation: 1,430 ft (440 m)
- Frozen: typically November to May
- Islands: Campers Island, Connors Island, Horseshoe Island, Munker Island, many others

Saganaga Lake is a large lake on the Minnesota – Ontario international border. Most of the lake is protected by the Boundary Waters Canoe Area Wilderness in the United States and by Quetico Provincial Park and La Verendrye Provincial Park in Canada. A small part of the lake's southern arm is outside the Boundary Waters. Its name comes from an Ojibwe term meaning Lake of Many Islands.

It is the deepest lake in the Boundary Waters Canoe Area Wilderness with a maximum depth of 280 ft (85 m) and surface area of 13,832 acres (5,598 ha). It's deepest point is not within the BWCA.

Saganaga is a popular fishing destination, with northern pike, walleye, lake trout, smallmouth bass, and lake whitefish among others. Minnesota Department of Natural Resources has issued a consumption advisory for some fish in Saganaga Lake due to mercury pollution. The Lake is the eastern boundary of the historical Hunter Island region. Saganaga Lake is bordered to the south by Seagull Lake, home to Wilderness Canoe Base. Historic Chik Wauk Lodge, now Chik-Wauk Museum and Nature Center, overlooks the lake.

Saganaga Lake, with the US/Canada border running through it.
