= Chik Wauk Lodge =

- U.S. National Register of Historic Places
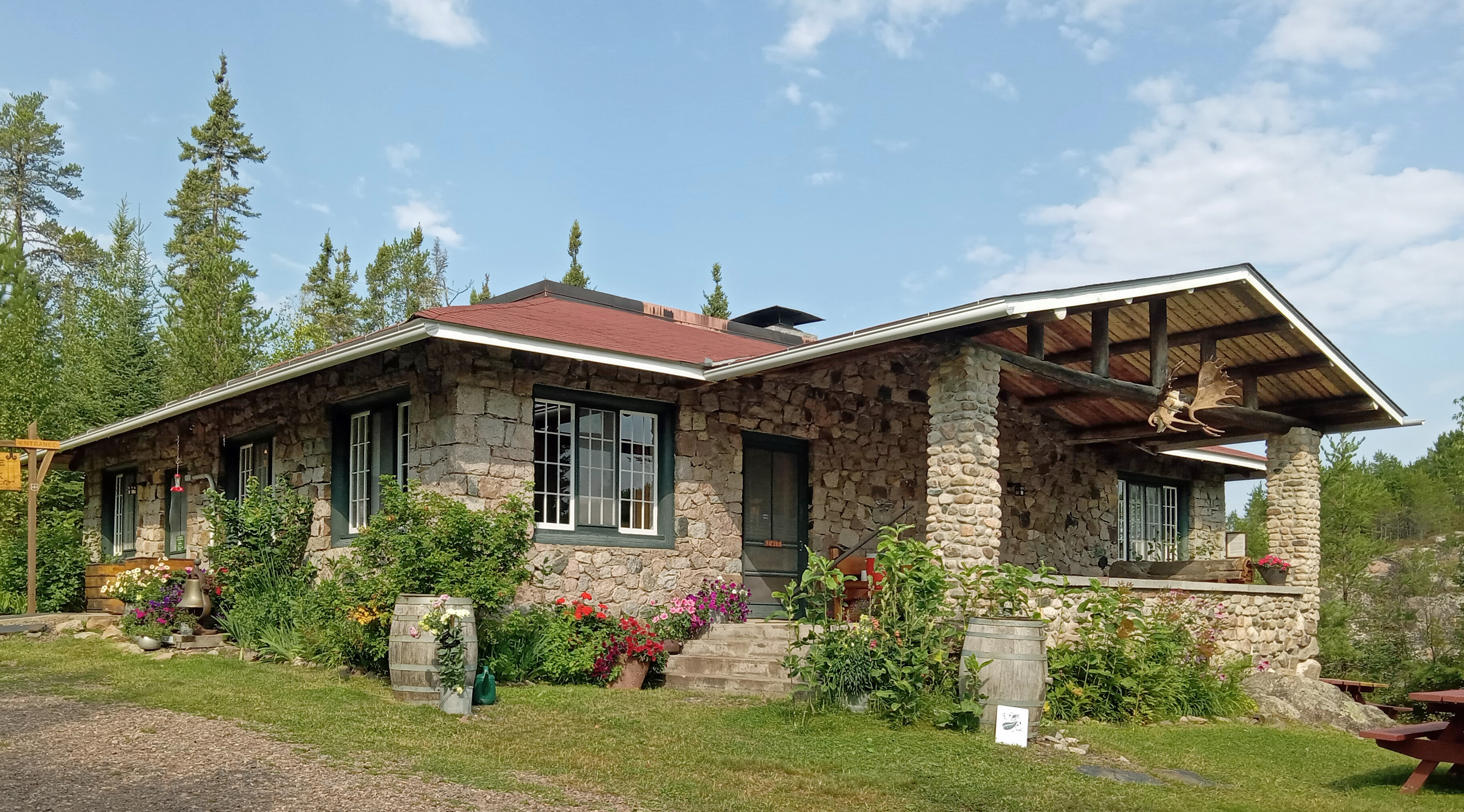
- Chik Wauk Lodge from the southeast

- Location within Minnesota Location within the United States
- Location: 28 Moose Pond Road, West Cook, Minnesota
- Coordinates: 48.168778°N 90.880913°W
- Area: .25 acres (0.10 ha)
- Built: 1933
- Architectural style: Edwin and Art Nunstedt
- NRHP reference No.: 07000599
- Designated: June 27, 2007

Chik Wauk Lodge, now Chik-Wauk Museum and Nature Center, is a historic building near the northern terminus of the Gunflint Trail northwest of Grand Marais, Minnesota, United States. It overlooks Saganaga Lake.

It was built in 1933. It was listed on the National Register of Historic Places in 2007, and was nominated for being "representative of the rustic, family-owned fishing resorts that flourished in the Boundary Waters region from the 1920s to the early '60s."

== Description ==
The lodge's NHRP summary describes it as a "rough-cut stone lodge building" which "was once the centerpiece of a large Gunflint Trail resort complex, which offered to tourists: lodging in rustic-style cabins, cooked meals as well as access to above-average fishing and northern Minnesota scenery." The building has not been significantly altered since its original construction in 1933.

== History ==
=== Early history ===
In the 1600s to 1800s, the area around what would become Chik Wauk was occupied by groups of migratory Native Americans who moved through the area seasonally to hunt, gather and fish. French and English voyageurs also made trading runs to and from Grand Portage.

The historic Gunflint Trail was first created in the 1870s, and was used by the logging and mining industries. It was developed significantly in response to the discovery of silver near Thunder Bay, Ontario, which raised hopes of finding gold and other precious metals in the area; none of these panned out. In the 1890s, iron ore was discovered, but the resultant mine was abandoned after better sources were discovered on the Mesabi Iron Range.

=== Tourism in the 20th century ===
The first tourist cabins were built on the Gunflint Trail in 1912. In 1929, in order to facilitate the construction of both Chik Wauk and the nearby Sea Gull Lodge, the Gunflint Trail was extended northwards by several miles to connect with Saganaga Lake.

By the time it was built in 1933, Chik Wauk was one of well over a dozen such resorts in the area. It was built by Edwin Nunstedt, a Swedish immigrant who owned building companies in Grand Marais and Two Harbors, Minnesota. The lodge served as a store, resort office, restaurant, and lounge area for resort guests. Nunstedt and his family ran the lodge until 1952. It was run as a resort until 1978, when the U.S. Forest Service bought out resorts in the region upon the formation of the Boundary Waters Canoe Area Wilderness. The Forest Service took over the lodge fully in 2000.

=== Museum and nature center ===
Since 2010, Chik Wauk has been run as a museum and nature center, which includes historical displays and artifacts, and exhibitions about local pioneers. There are also five short hiking trails.

== Gallery ==
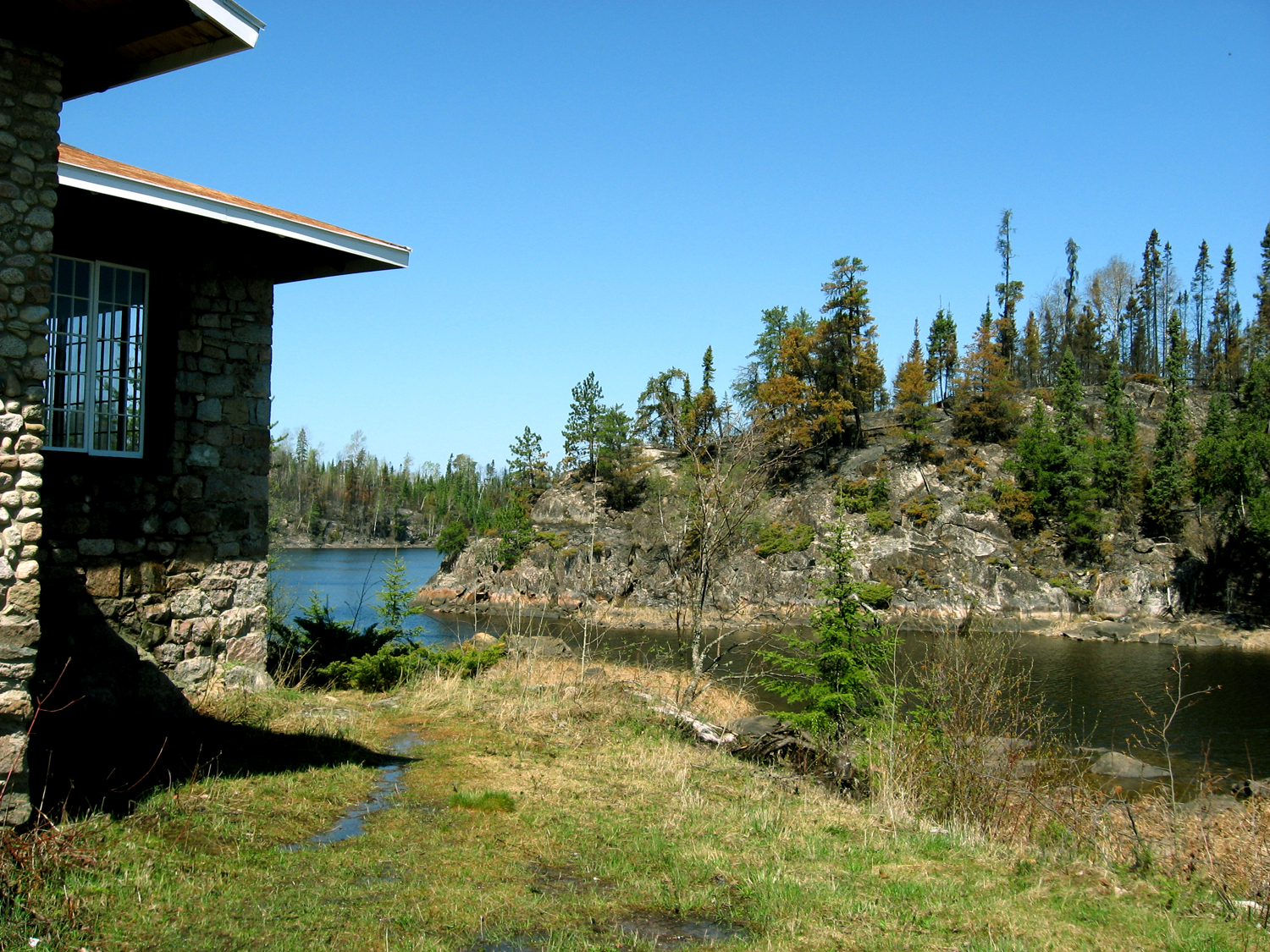
View of the Gunflint Trail Scenic Byway from the lodge

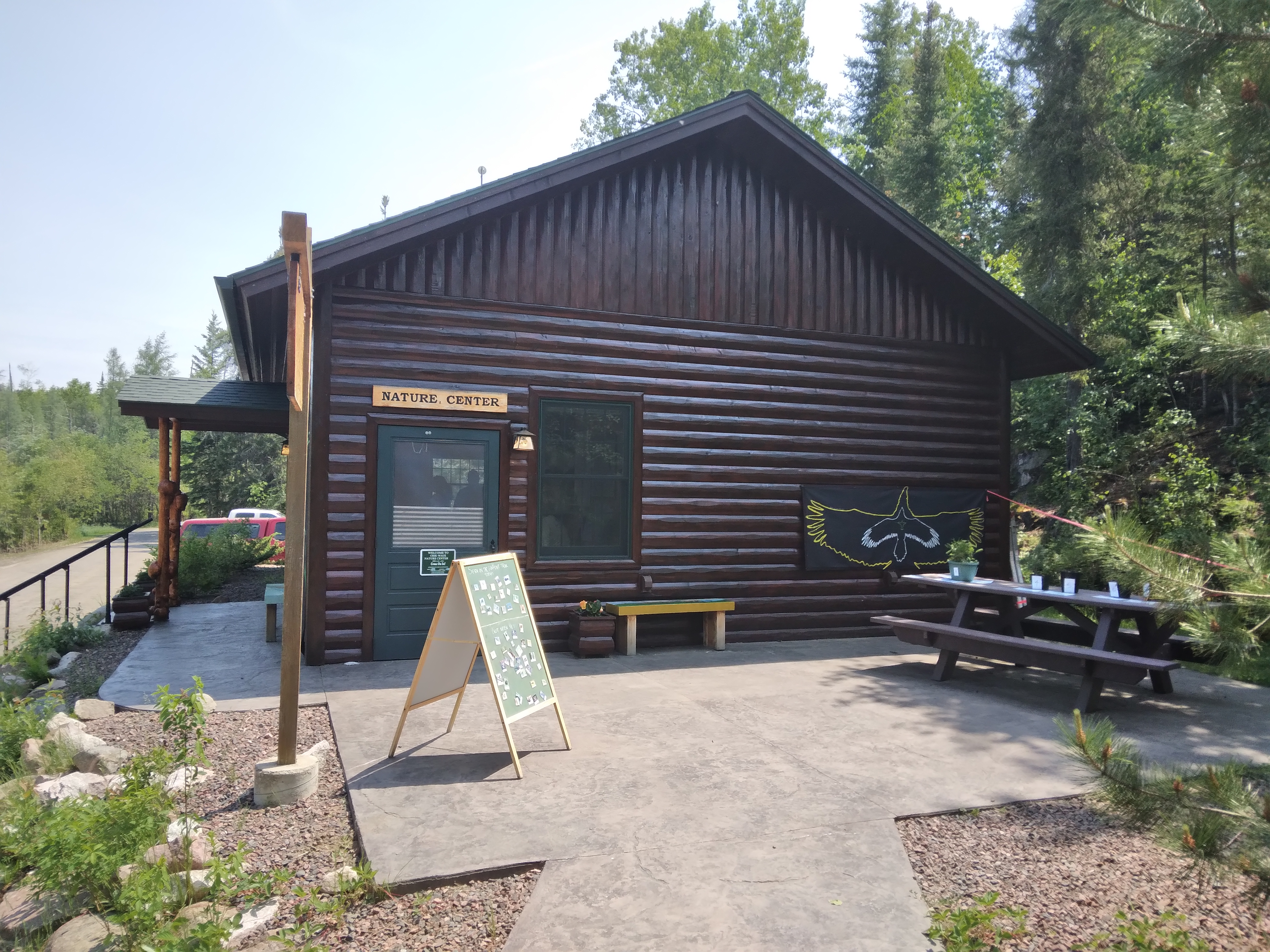
Nature Center building

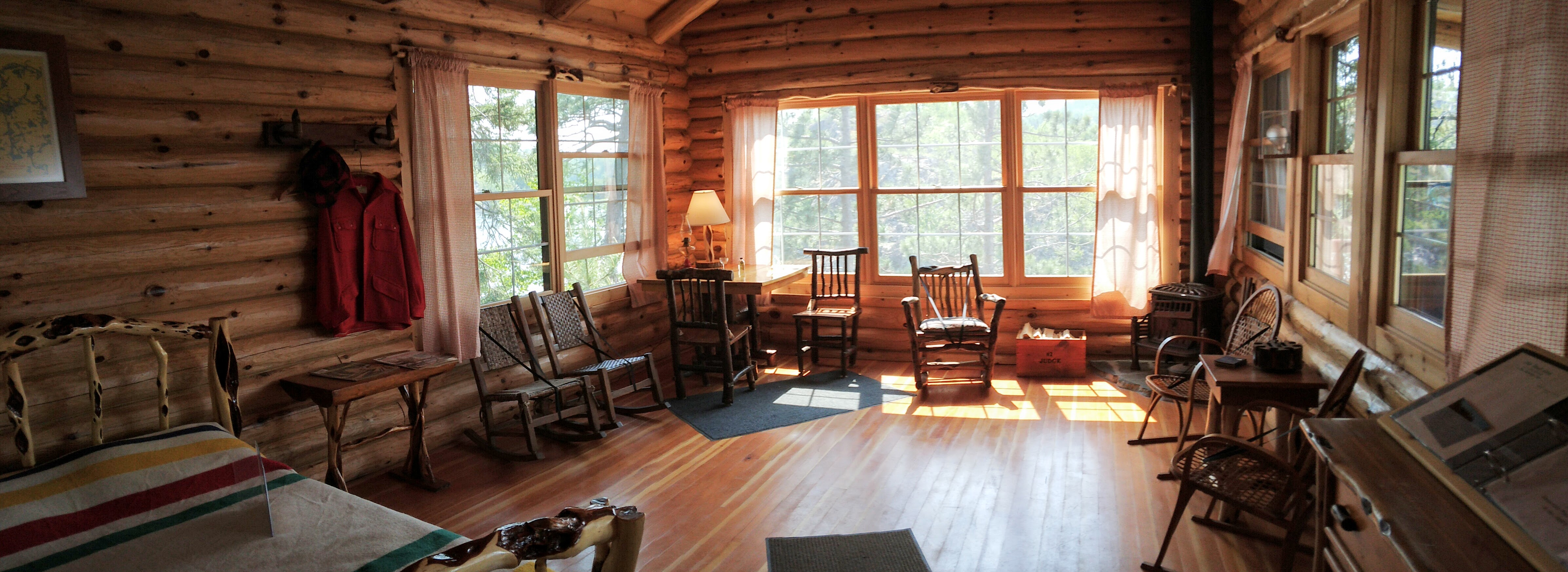
Judge's cabin interior

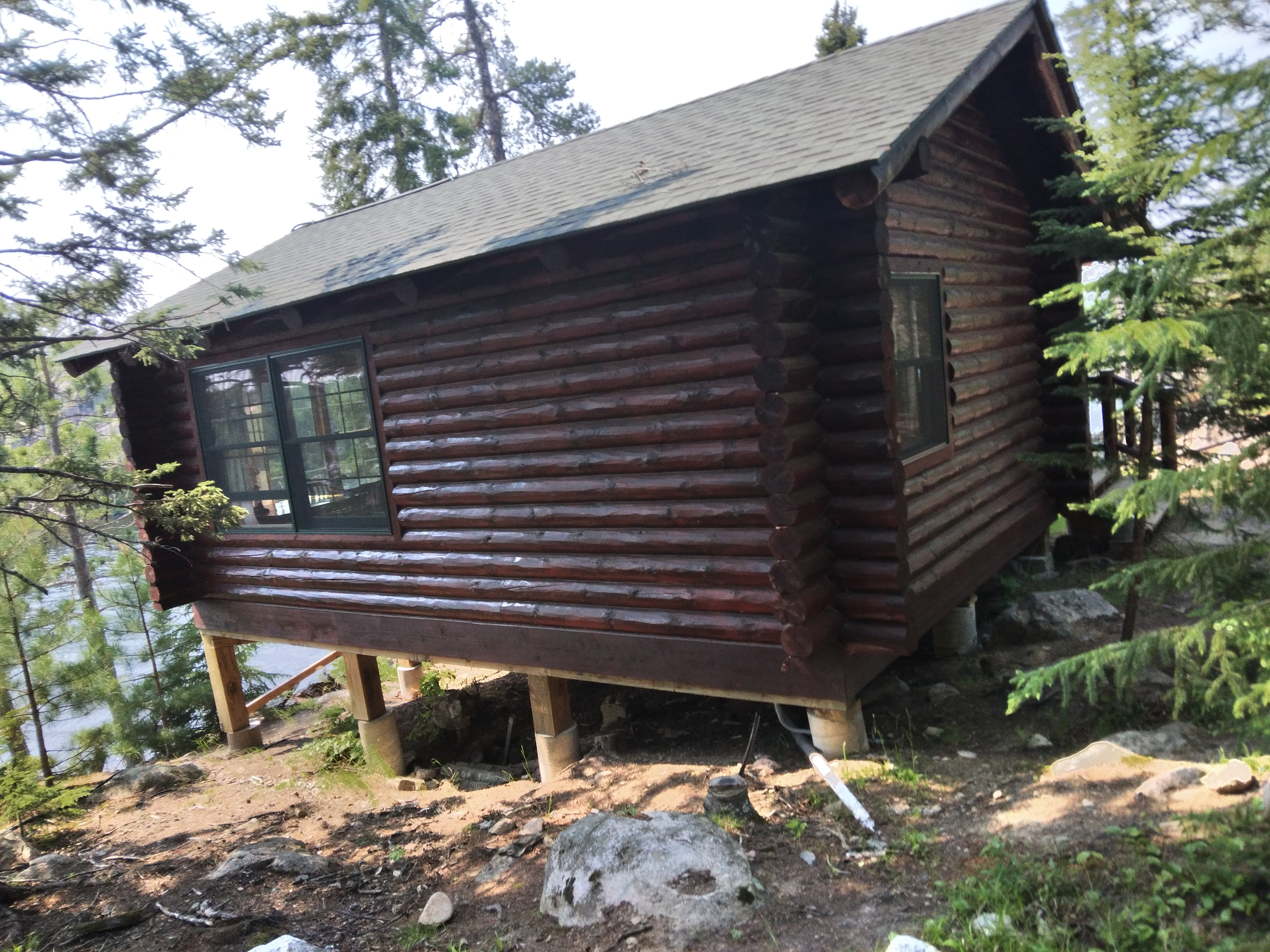
Judge's cabin exterior

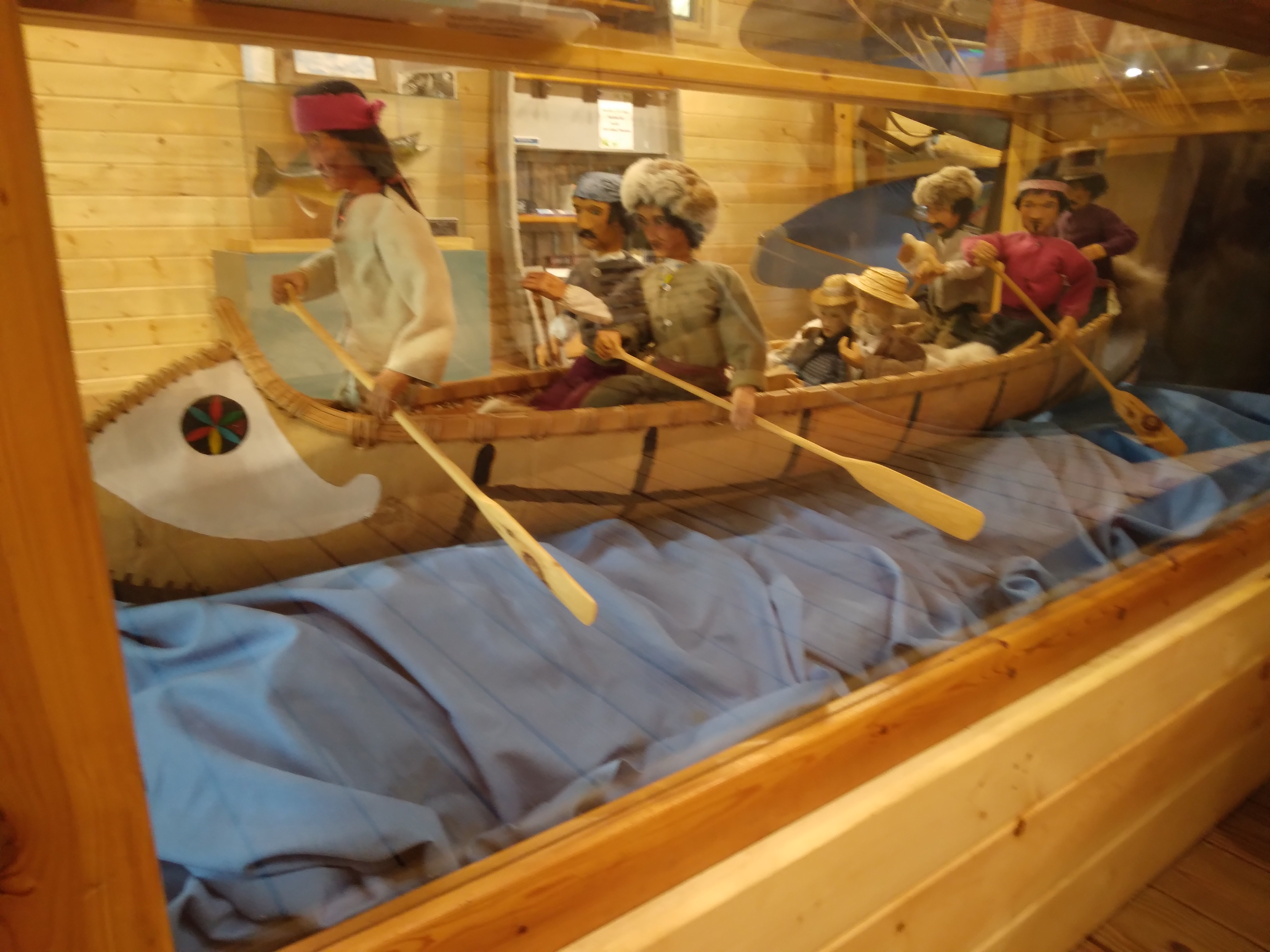
Voyageur exhibit

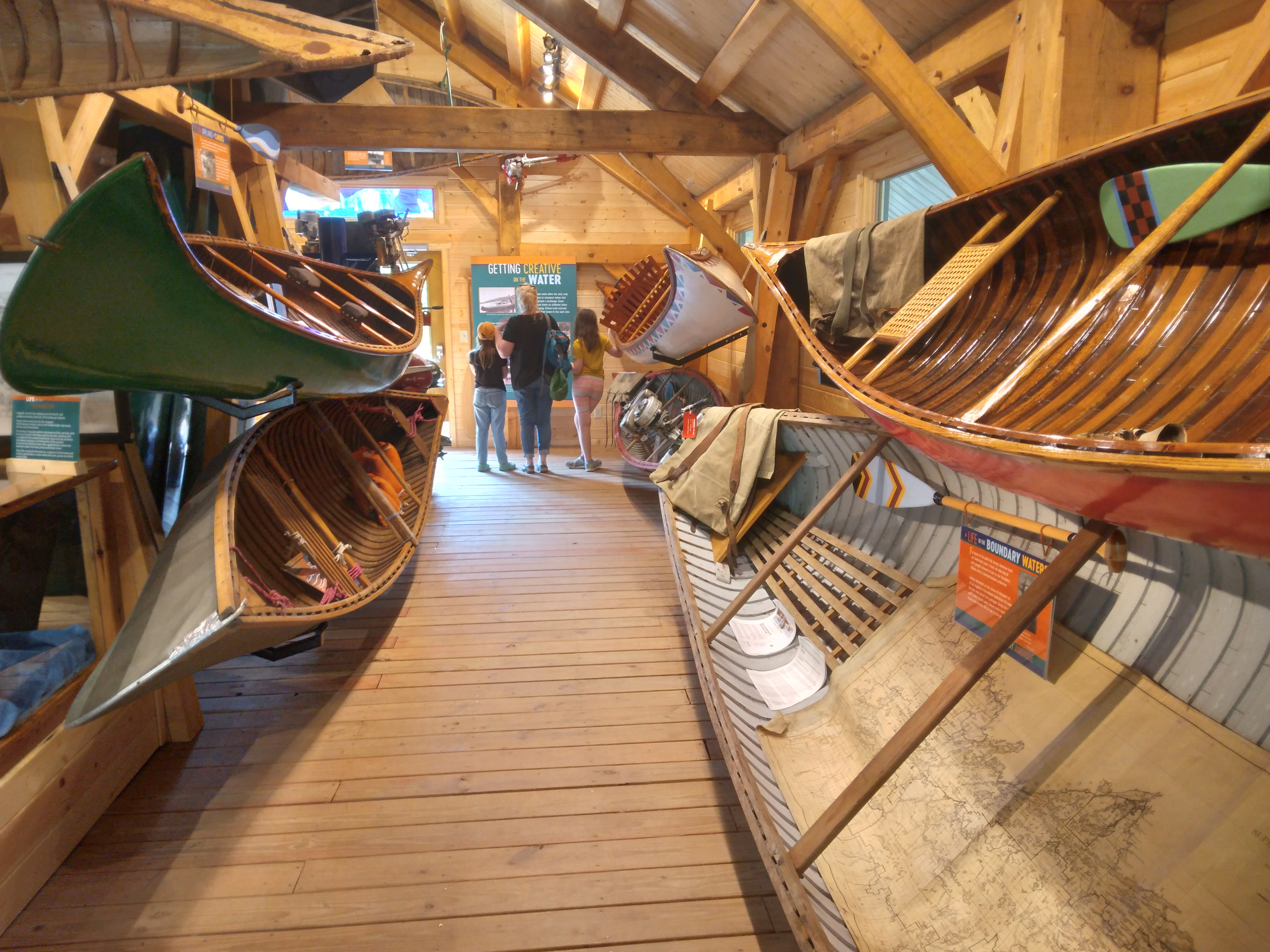
Watercraft exhibit

== See also ==
- National Register of Historic Places listings in Cook County, Minnesota
