= Quetico Provincial Park =

Wilderness park in Ontario, Canada

- IUCN category Ib (wilderness area)
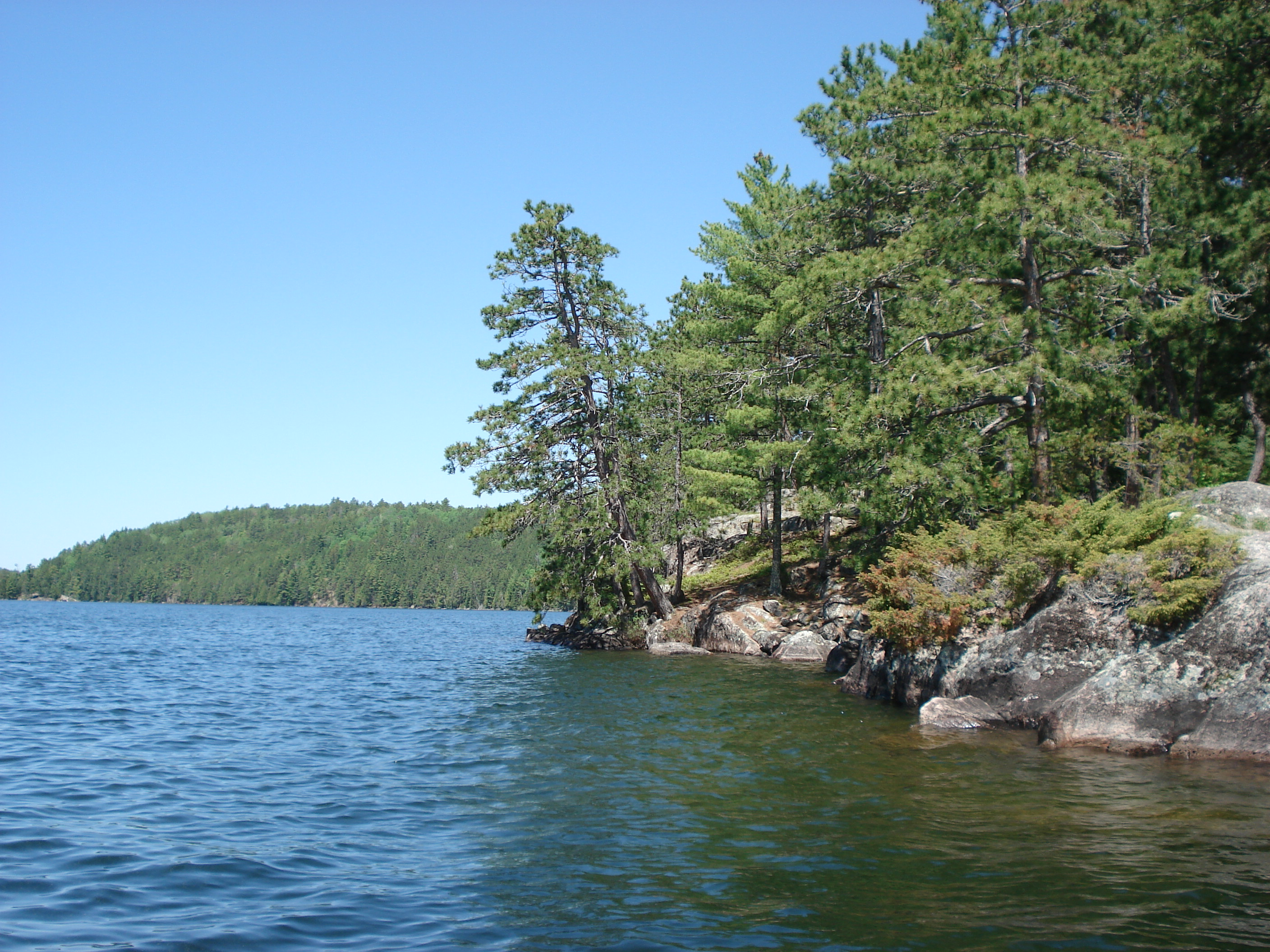

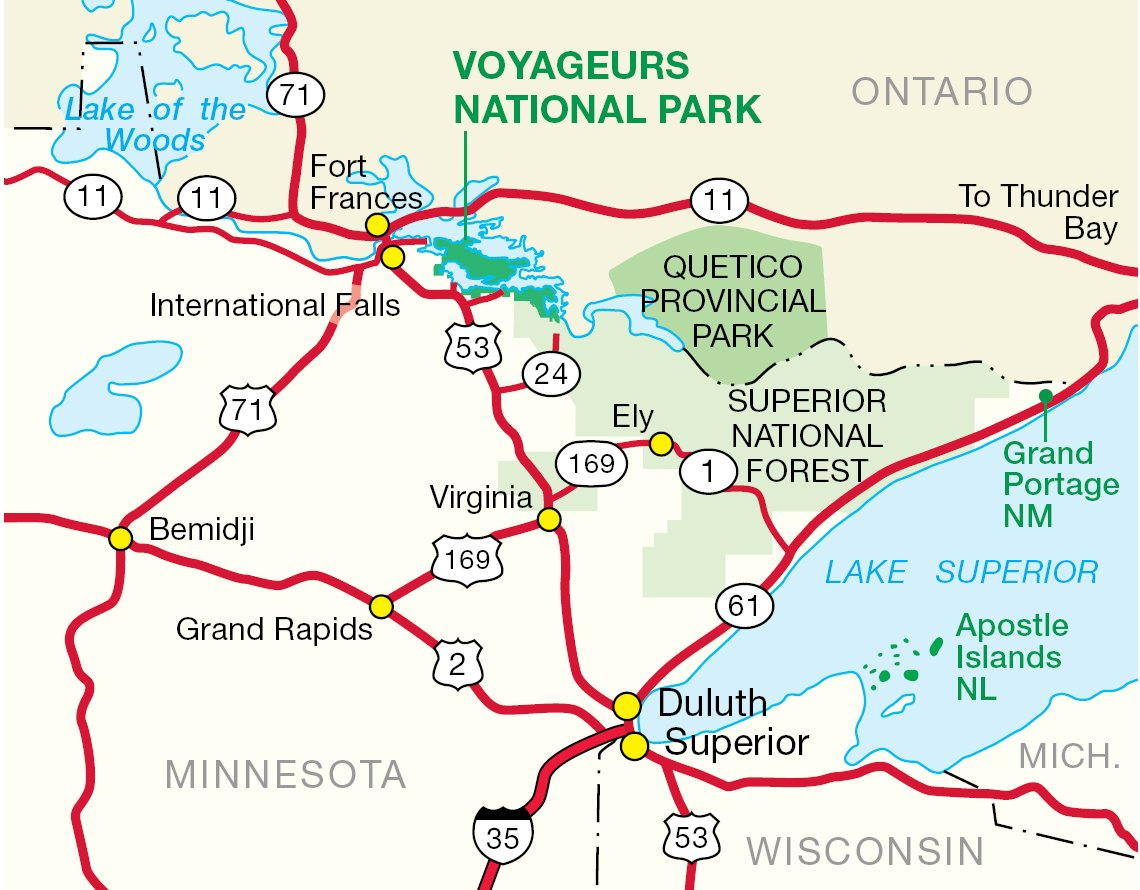
- Location of the park in Northwestern Ontario, close to the U.S. border
- Interactive map of Quetico Provincial Park
- Location: Rainy River District, Ontario, Canada
- Nearest city: Atikokan, Ontario
- Coordinates: 48°23′47″N 91°32′7″W
- Area: 4,760 km^{2} (1,840 sq mi)
- Established: 1913 (1909 as Quetico Forest Preserve)
- Visitors: 50,724 (in 2022)
- Governing body: Ontario Parks
- Website: www.ontarioparks.ca/park/quetico

Quetico Provincial Park is a large wilderness park in Northwestern Ontario, Canada, known for its excellent canoeing and fishing. The 4,760 km^{2} (1,180,000-acre) park shares its southern border with Minnesota's Boundary Waters Canoe Area Wilderness, which is part of the larger Superior National Forest. These large wilderness parks are often collectively referred to as the Boundary Waters or the Quetico-Superior Country.

== Geography ==
The park includes over 2000 unofficial, unimproved wilderness campsites spread throughout more than 600 lakes. Canoeists require permit reservations and in-season may enter the Quetico only via six Ranger Stations, which serve 21 specific entry points. Visitors may drive to three of these ranger stations: Dawson Trail, Atikokan, and Lac La Croix. Beaverhouse can be reached only by portage and paddle; visitors may paddle or take a tow from an outfitter to reach Cache Bay or Prairie Portage stations. Drive-in camping is available only at the Dawson Trail campground; log cabins are also available to rent.

Most of the southern half of the Park is a region known historically as "Hunter Island" (not a real island).

== History ==
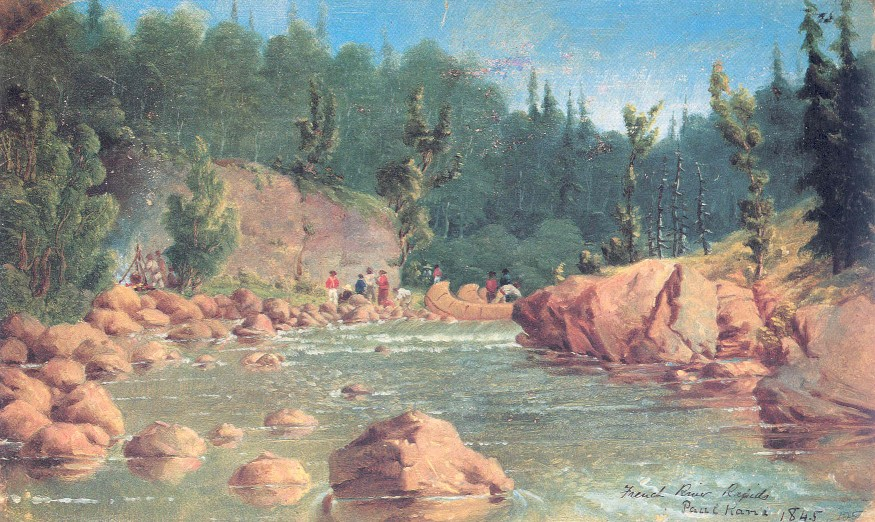
French River Rapids, field sketch by Paul Kane, 1845.

The north country was inhabited by the Paleo-Indian culture circa 8000 BC. Limited artifacts have been found in the park from that era and the subsequent Archaic period circa 6000 years ago. Among these is rock art, such as a canoe pictograph at Agnes Lake. Artifacts from the Early Woodland Era (circa 1300 years ago) have not been found there, but pottery and clay pipes from the Later Woodland Indians have been found there.

In 1909, an Order in Council by the Government of Ontario established the Quetico Forest Reserve. Early the same year, the United States federal government established the adjacent Superior National Forest and Superior Game Refuge, part of which would eventually be designated and protected as the Boundary Waters Canoe Area Wilderness. Quetico Provincial Park was created in 1913 through passage of the Provincial Parks Act. Road access was not constructed until 1954.

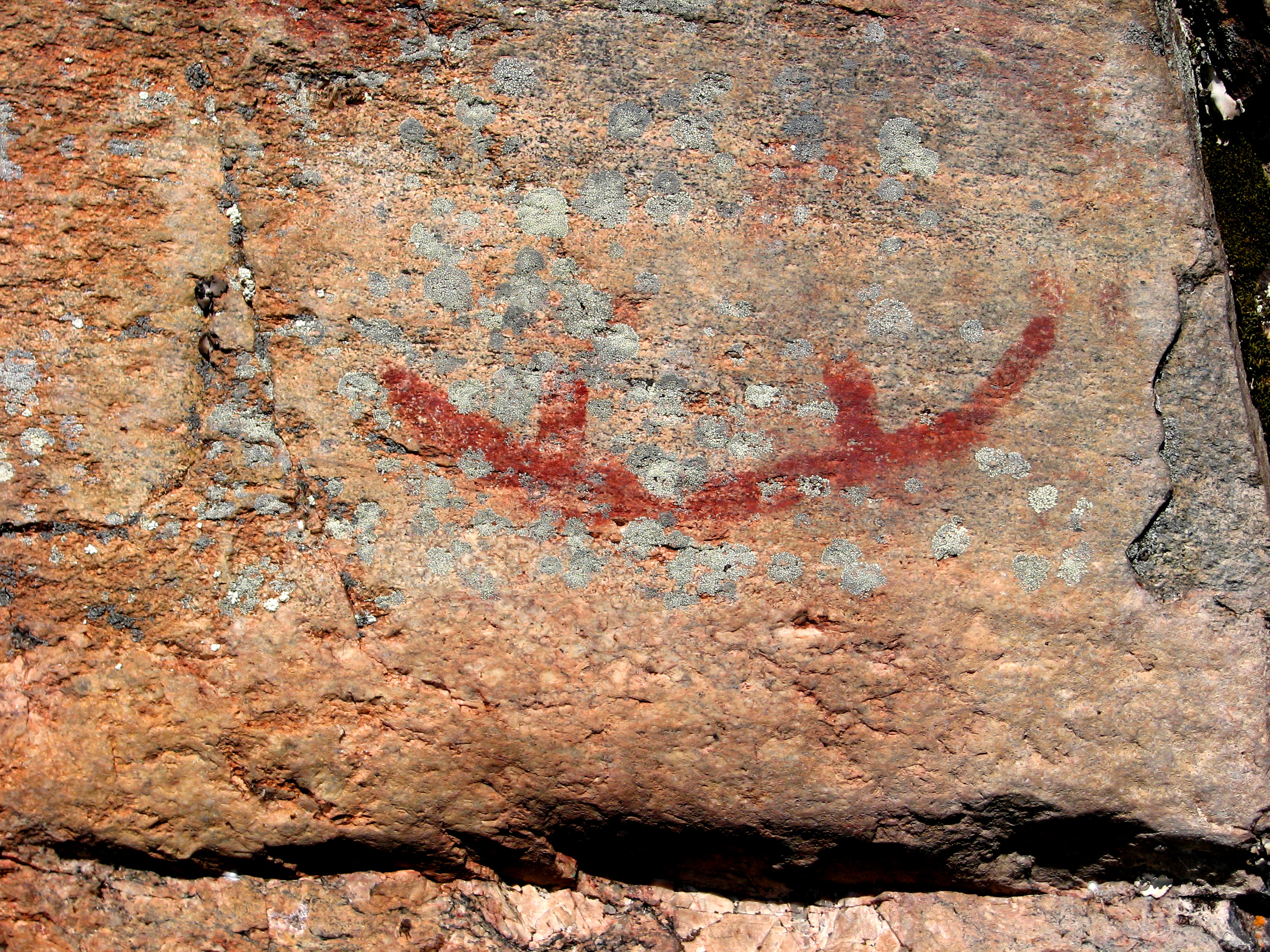
Canoe pictograph, Agnes Lake

Ontario's creation of the park created a conflict with the Lac La Croix First Nation, who had a reserve located within the park boundaries. In 1915, the province cancelled the band's right to Reserve 24C and relocated the people, also effectively cancelling their treaty rights from the reserve. The grievances of the band were not addressed until 1991, when the Minister of Natural Resources, Bud Wildman, made a landmark, formal apology in the legislature for these actions. Wildman also committed to government "immediate and long-term assistance to improve the economic and social conditions of the band". He approved one of the band's requests: to allow them to use mechanized boats and canoes on three additional lakes in the park for the purposes of guiding, and to expand use of floatplanes, during an interim period while public review was conducted.

The origin of the park's name is obscure. Locals say the park is named after the "Quebec Timber Company". The name may also be a version of the French words quête de la côte, which means "search for the coast". It may also be from an Ojibwe name for a benevolent spirit who resides in places of great beauty.

The park has been completely protected from logging since 1971. Motor vehicles, including boats, were banned in the Quetico in 1979. An exception allows members of the Lac La Croix Guides Association, part of the Lac La Croix First Nation, to operate power boats with engines of no more than 10 horsepower (7.5 kW) on Quetico, Beaverhouse, Wolseley, Tanner, Minn, and McAree lakes. Following public review of an amended management plan in the late 1990s, and additional changes, in the early 21st century, the official plan (Agreement of Coexistence) is to phase out motorized guiding activities by the Lac La Croix First Nation in Quetico Provincial Park through simple attrition by the year 2015.

== Regulations ==
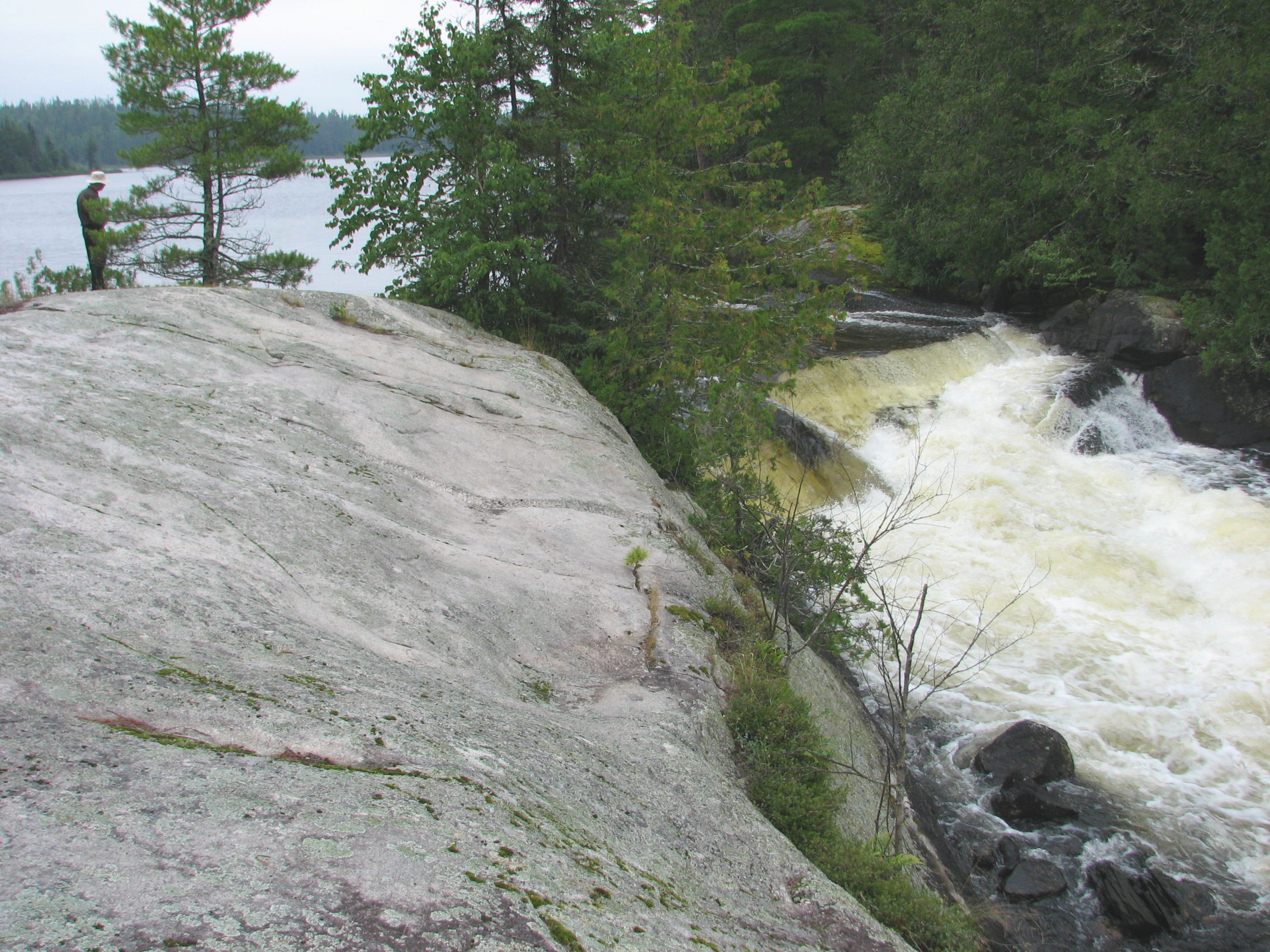
Falls near Pickerel Lake

Quetico has restrictions as a wilderness park: Group size may not exceed nine members. Containers of fuel, insect repellent, medicines, personal toilet articles, and other items that are not food or beverage are the only cans or bottles that may be brought into Quetico. It is an offence to possess non-burnable and non-reusable food or beverage containers. Mechanized devices such as power saws, generators, ice augers, or portage wheels are prohibited. It is illegal to damage live trees and other plants, and to remove any plants from the park.

Fishing regulations were updated effective 1 January 2008. Only barbless hooks and artificial bait in the Park are permitted. "This means that no live or dead organic bait can be used in the park, including but not limited to leeches, worms, and salted minnows." Barbed hooks may be carried in a tackle box but must not be used on the fishing line. Barbed hooks must be pinched before being attached to a fishing line. Park users are encouraged to use only lead-free tackle when fishing within the park.

Hunting or molesting wildlife, or possession of a firearm or fireworks is not allowed.

== Geology and drainage ==
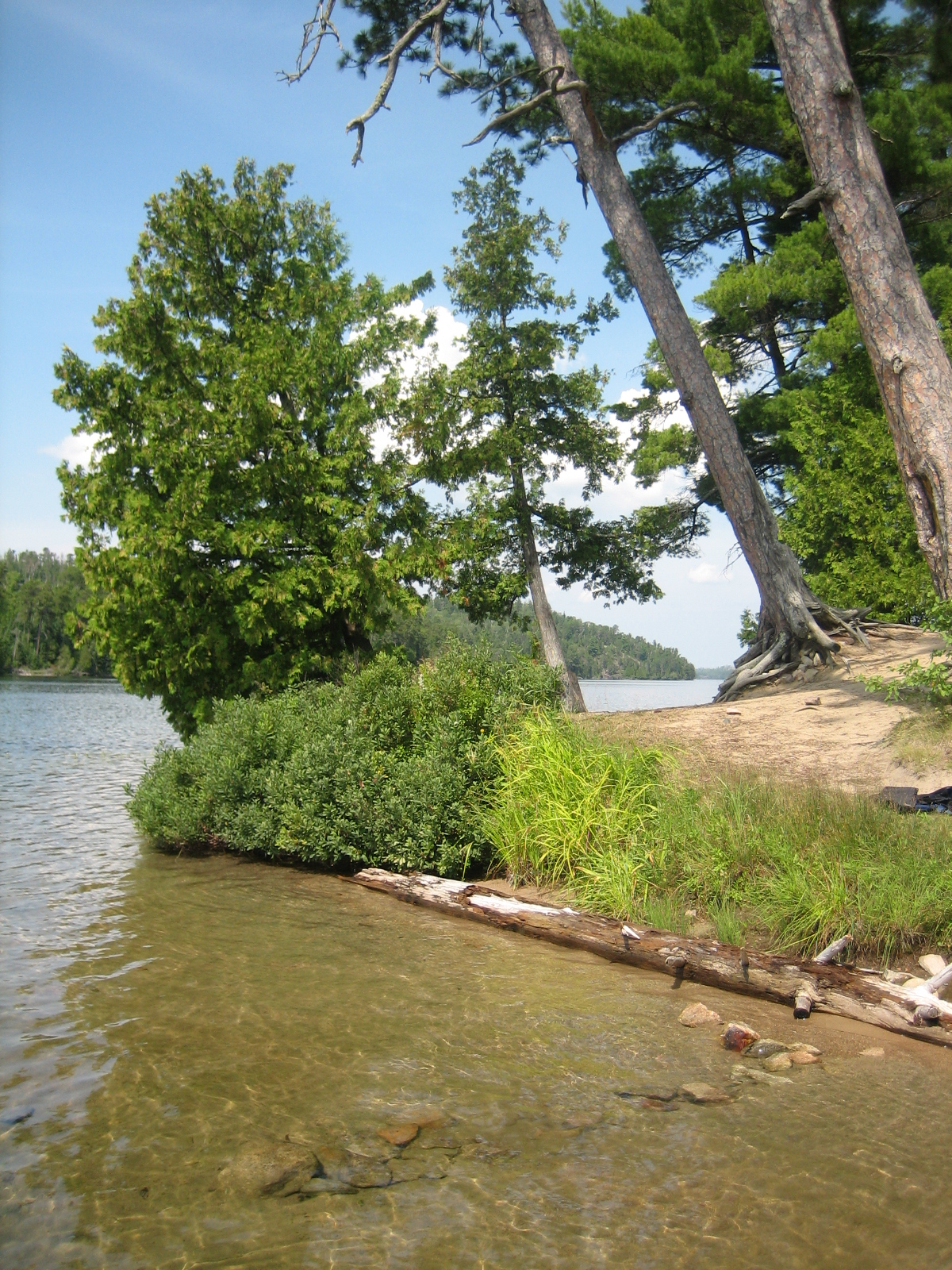
Agnes Lake

Quetico is near the southern edge of the Canadian Shield, an exposed 1000-mile expanse of ancient Precambrian rock, some of which is among the oldest exposed rock in the world. The park contains numerous "young" lakes (only tens of thousands of years old) that are held by this ancient bedrock. Due to its proximity to the Laurentian Divide, the park can be considered to be in the headwaters of the Hudson Bay watershed. It and the adjacent Boundary Waters Canoe Area Wilderness in the United States comprise the most popular canoeing area in the world.

The southern part of the park is drained by the Basswood River, the central and eastern parts of the park by the Maligne River, and the northern part of the park by the Quetico River. All of these rivers flow into the Namakan River west of the park. It flows into the Rainy River, Winnipeg River, Nelson River and finally into Hudson Bay.

== Nature and ecology ==
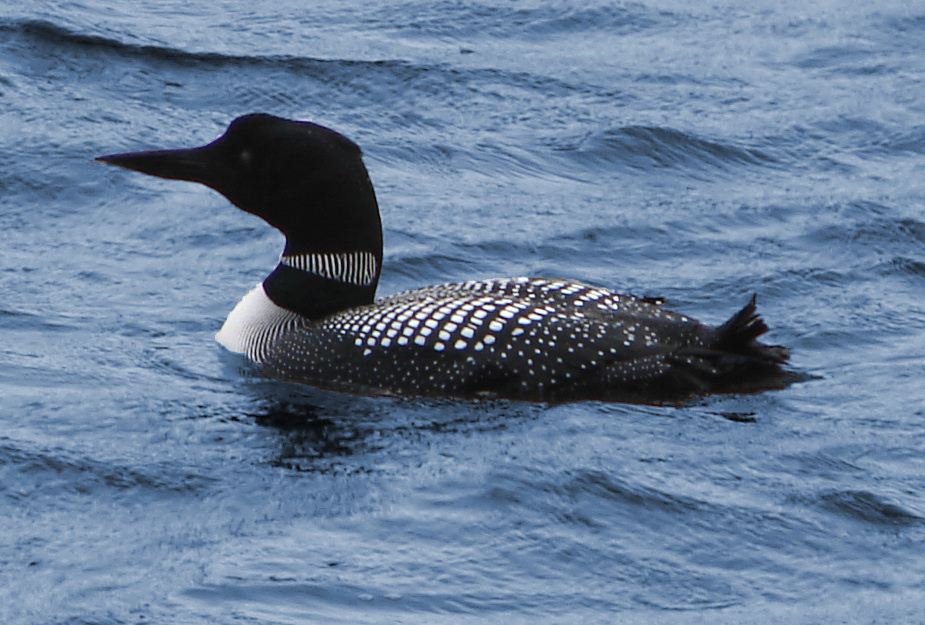
Common loon

Quetico Provincial Park is home to many different species of animals. Because of Quetico's strict regulations for keeping the habitat of these animals unchanged, there are a wide variety of animals that will be seen during a visit to Quetico. A majority of the animals include small mammals. These small mammals include, squirrels, chipmunks, raccoons, groundhogs, rabbits, minks, gophers, weasels, and porcupines. Other small animals that live in Quetico are otters, muskrats, beavers, and fishers. Besides small mammals, the wildlife in Quetico makes a perfect home for larger mammals. While visiting, one may see moose, wolves, coyotes, lynxes, bobcats, cougars, white-tailed deer, foxes, and black bears. Due to the risk of bear attacks, it is important to see how to handle bear encounters. There are also a wide variety of birds living in the park. Some of the common birds seen in Quetico include common loons, bald eagles, herring gulls, Canada geese and red-tailed hawks. Quetico is known for its excellent fishing. The four most popular fish in Quetico's water are smallmouth bass, northern pike, walleye and lake trout.

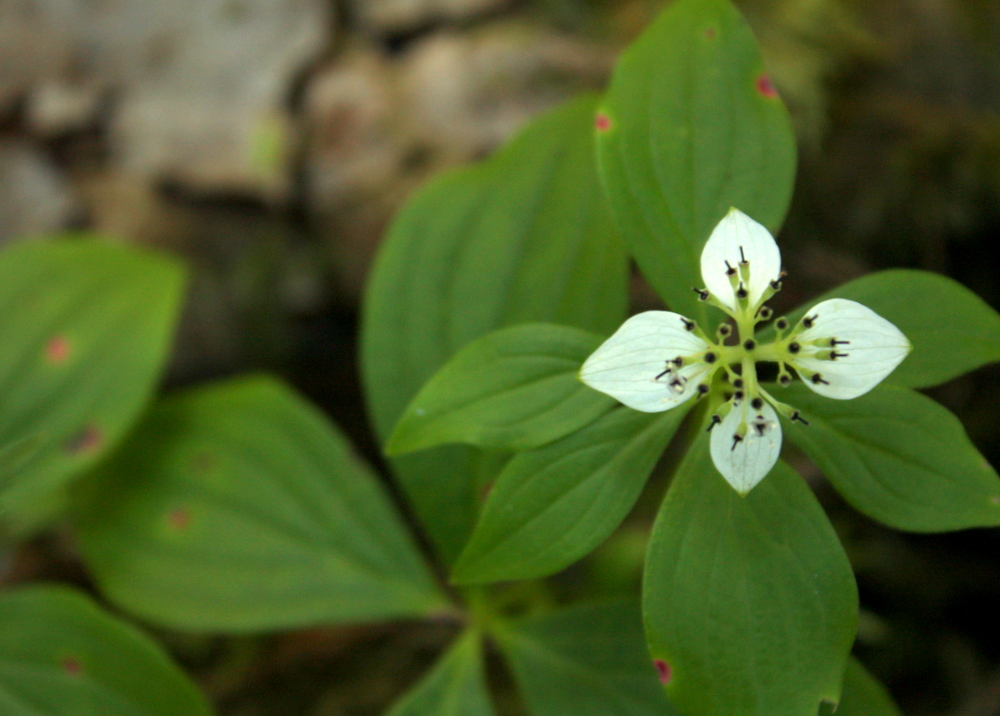
Bunchberry plant

White pine is a common tree in the area, these trees are home to bald eagles and other large birds. Another tree that can be found is the red pine. Red pines are different from white pines in that the red pine has long clusters of two needles with red bark. The white pine has clusters of five soft thin needles. Other trees include cedar, birch, trembling aspen, red osier dogwood and many others. Because of all the wet marsh areas, there are many wetlands in Quetico. Labrador Tea is a shrub that can be found in some of these wetlands. Labrador Tea has a leathery texture with a soft green color. This plant was commonly used by Native Americans and Voyageurs for tobacco and tea. Bunchberry plants have four or six leaves. The plant has white flowers in the spring and red berries in the summer. Although there are many plants in the park with berries, it is important to learn which berries are edible before eating them.

== Gallery ==
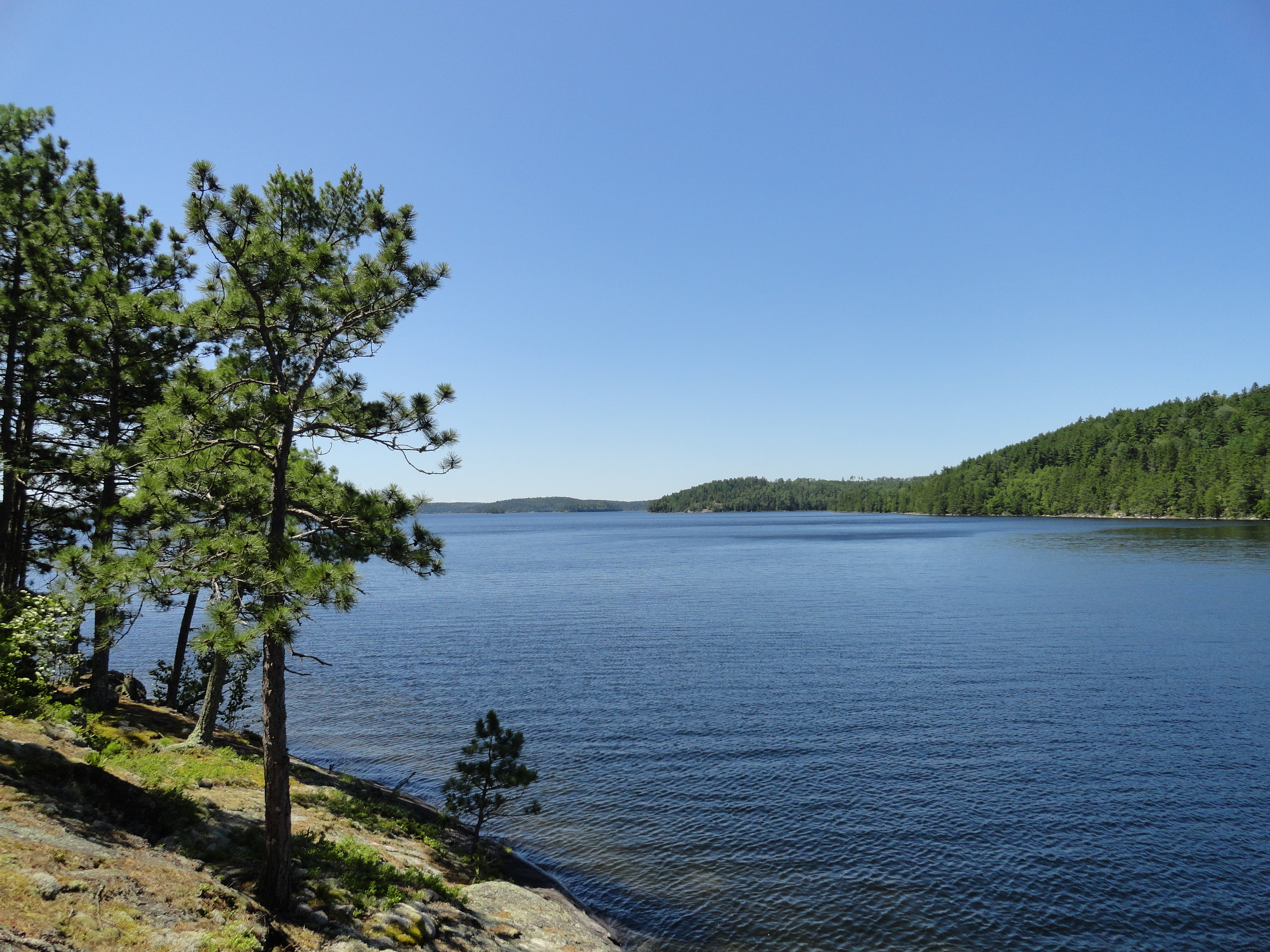
View from a campsite on Beaverhouse Lake

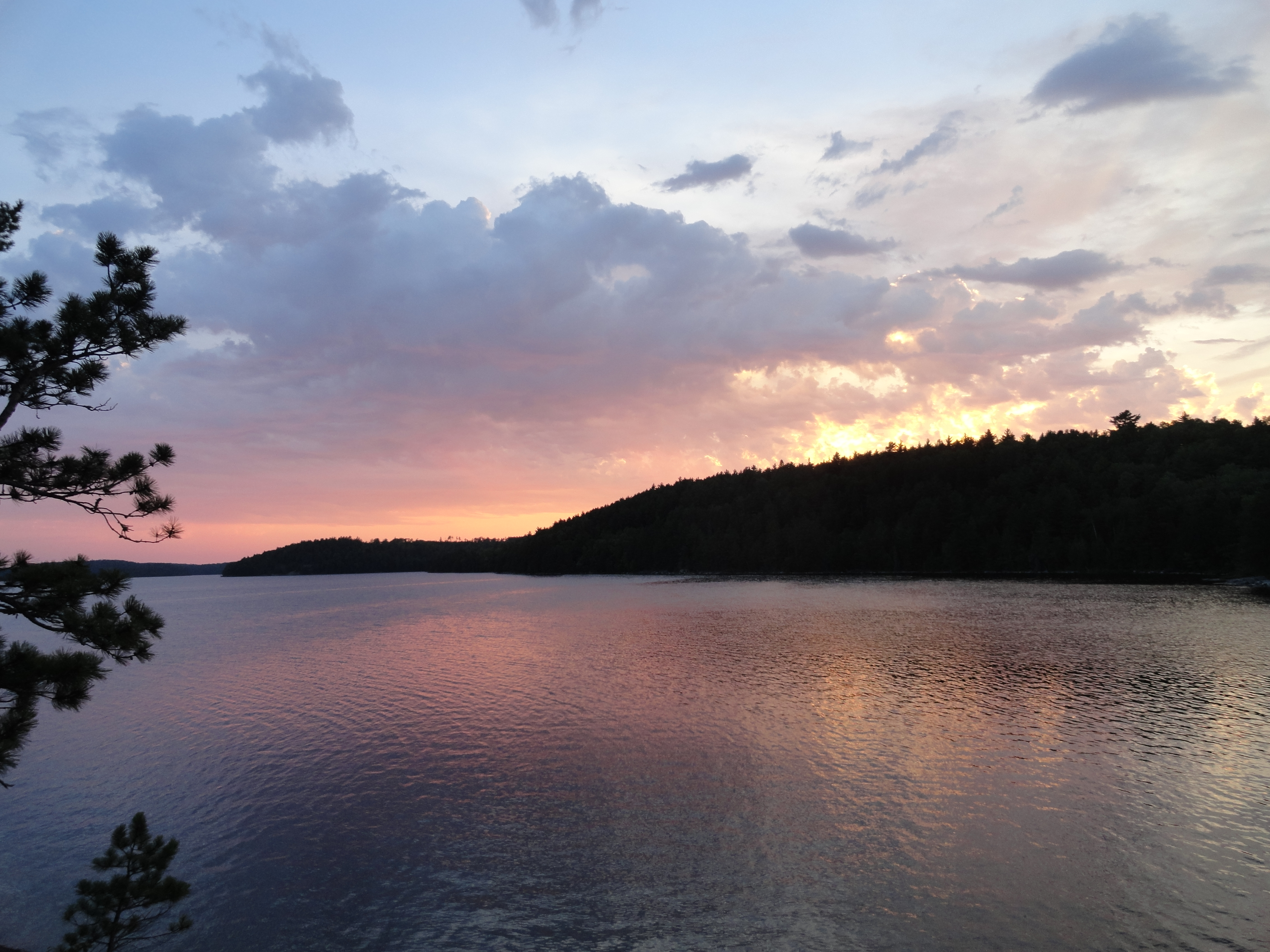
Sunset on Beaverhouse Lake

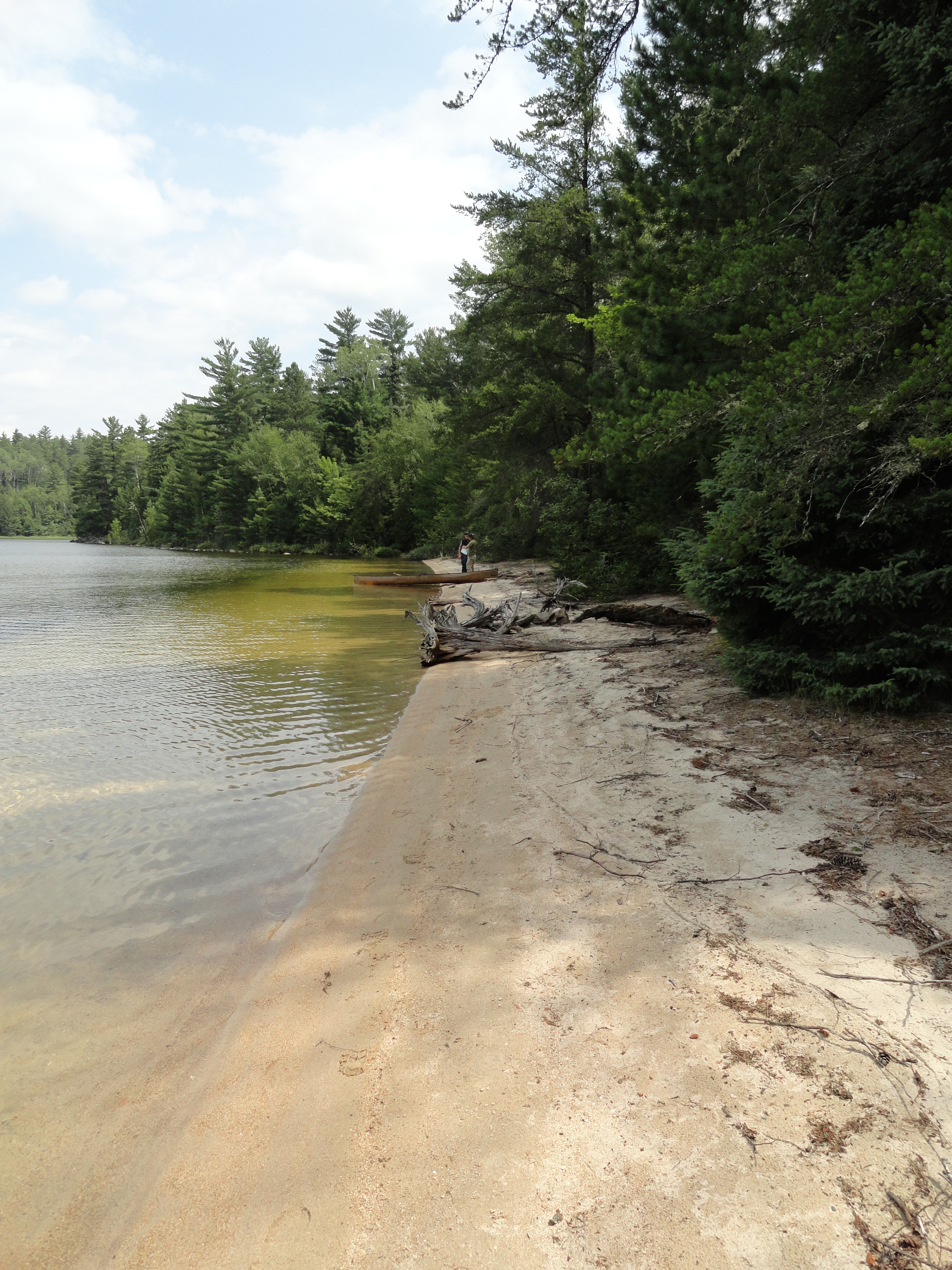
Hidden beach on Beaverhouse Lake

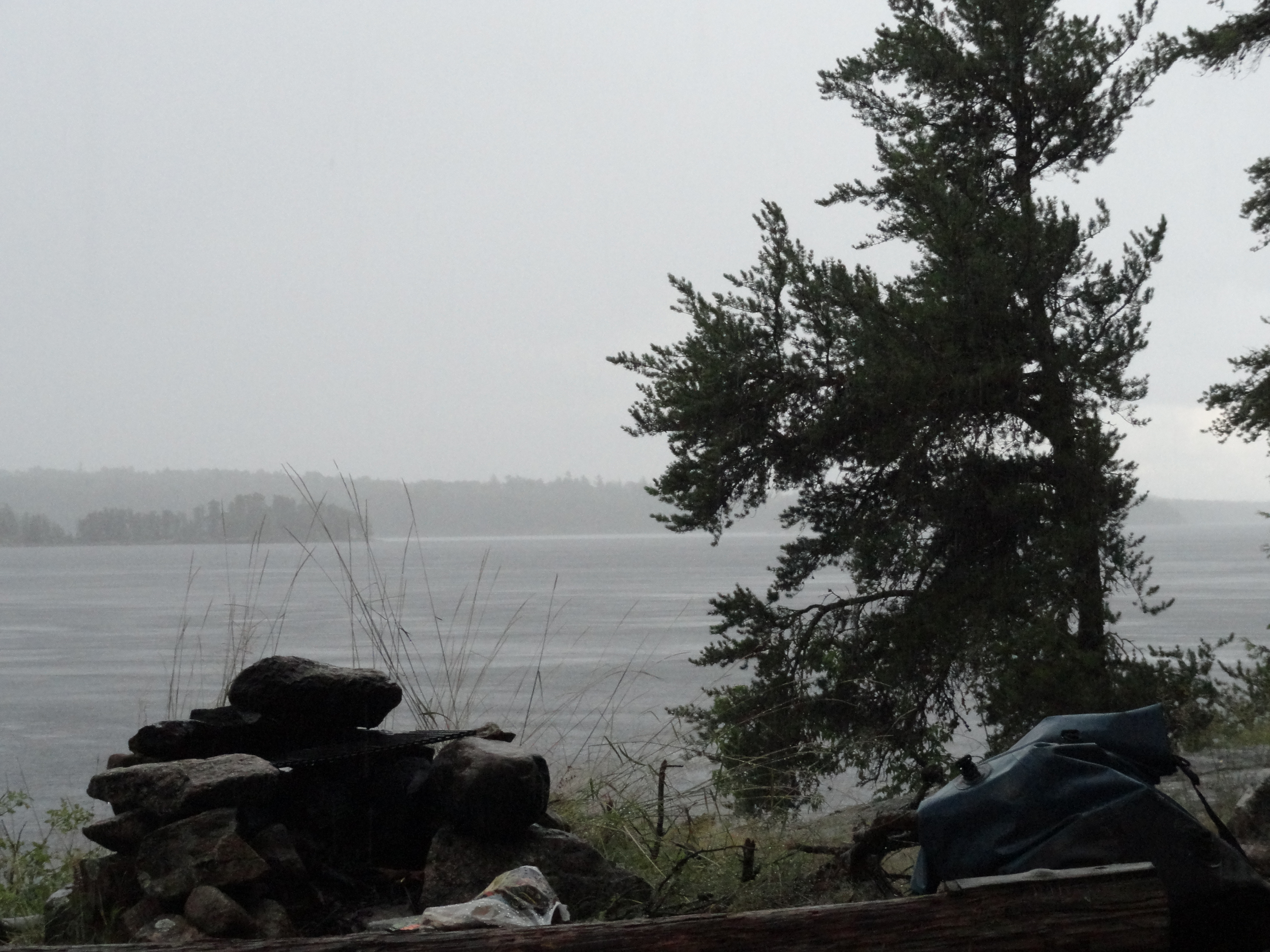
Severe summer storm crashing over Kawnipi Lake

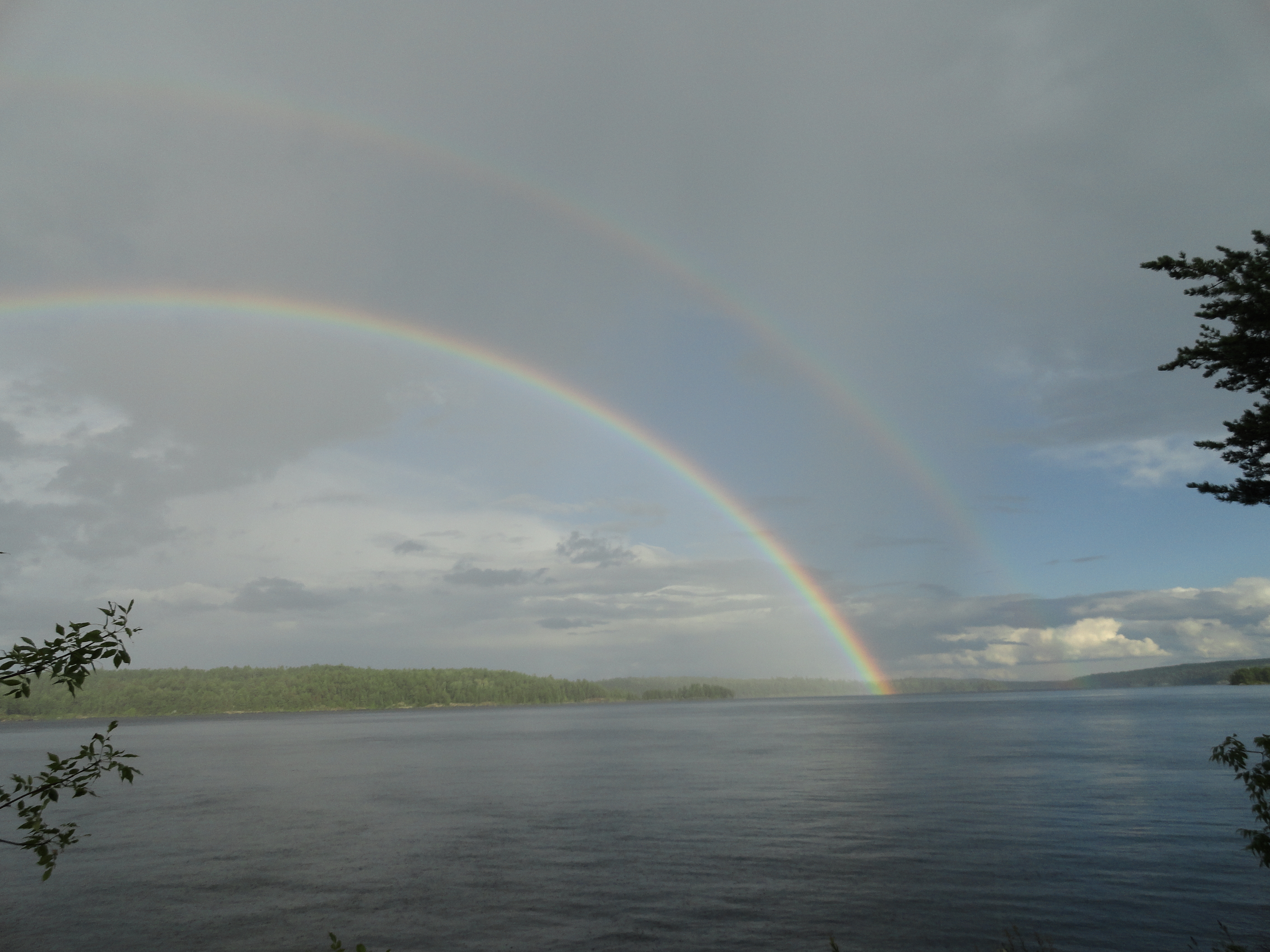
Double rainbow after the storm on Kawnipi Lake

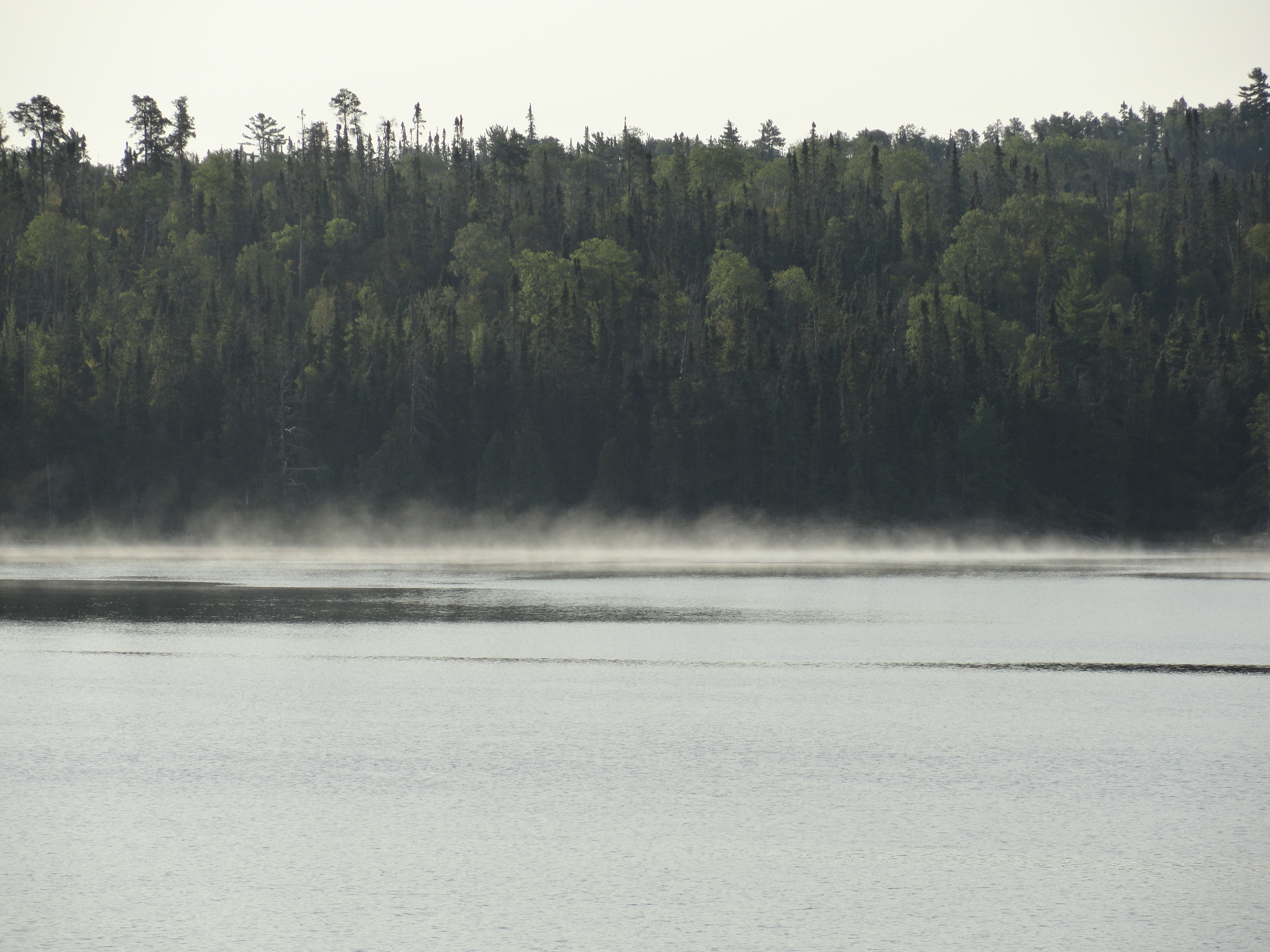
Some early morning fog on Keats Lake

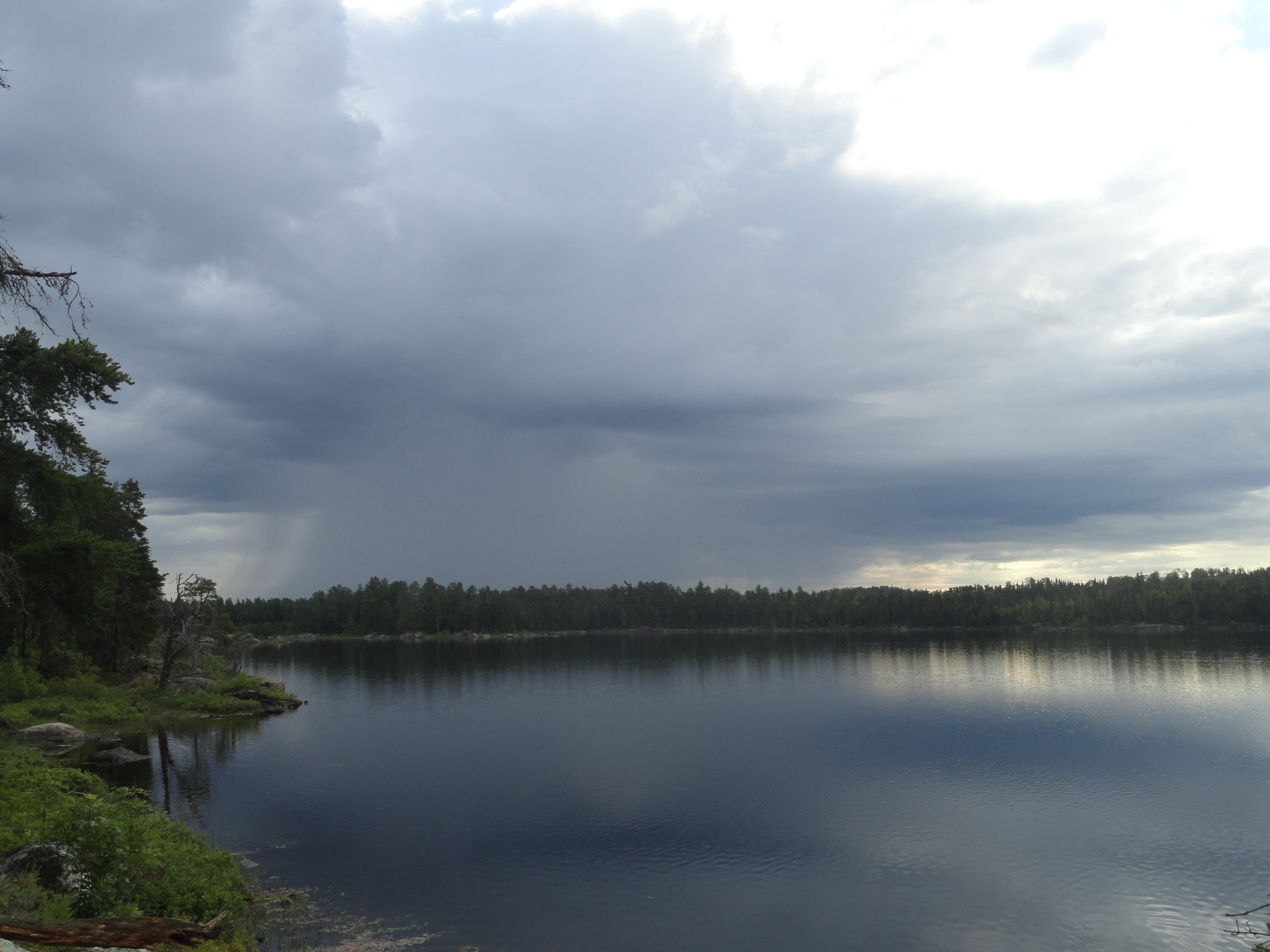
Rainstorm skirts over Keats Lake

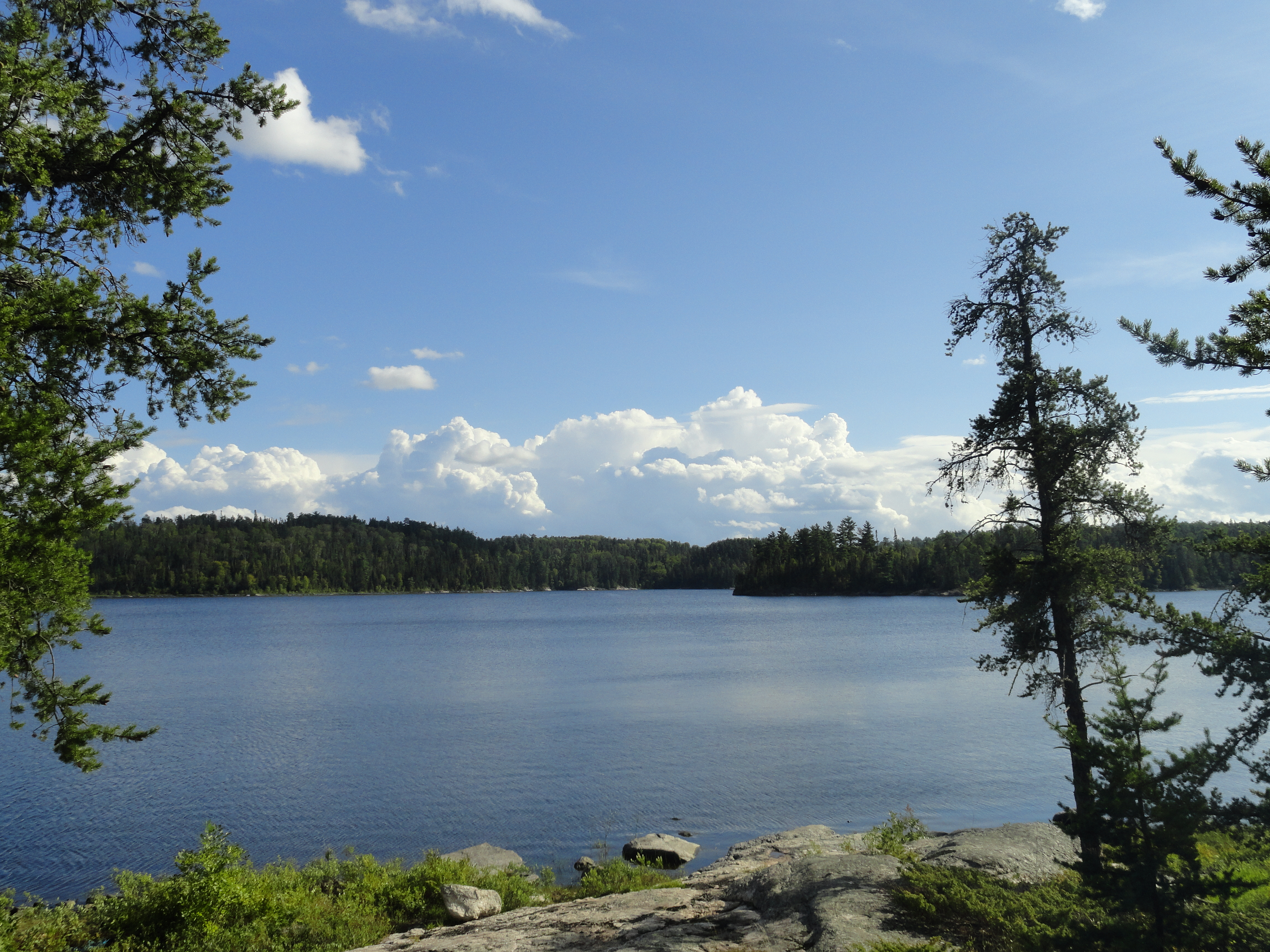
Summer day on Keats Lake

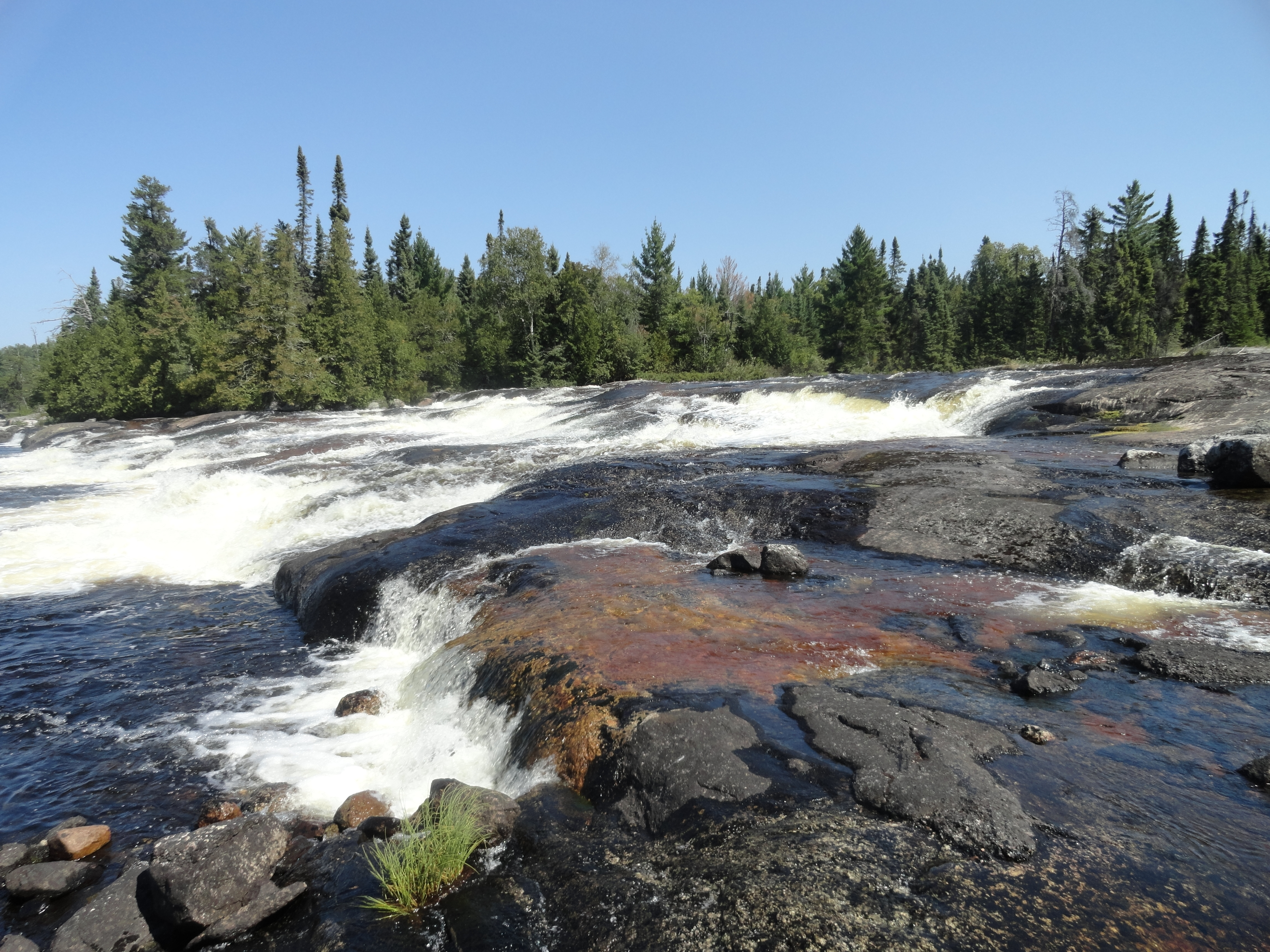
Snake Falls, on the east side of Keats Lake

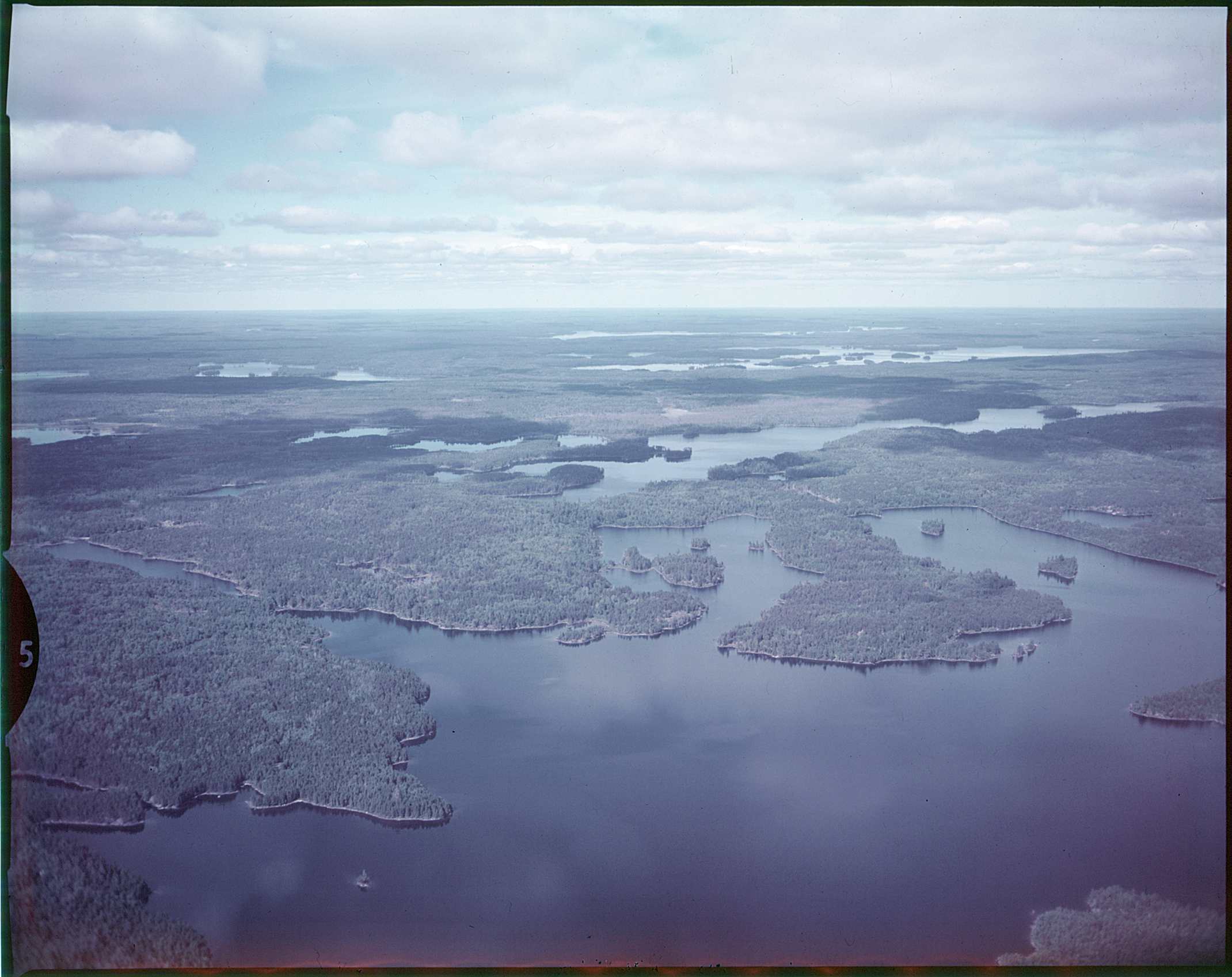
Aerial view of Quetico Provincial Park, 1958

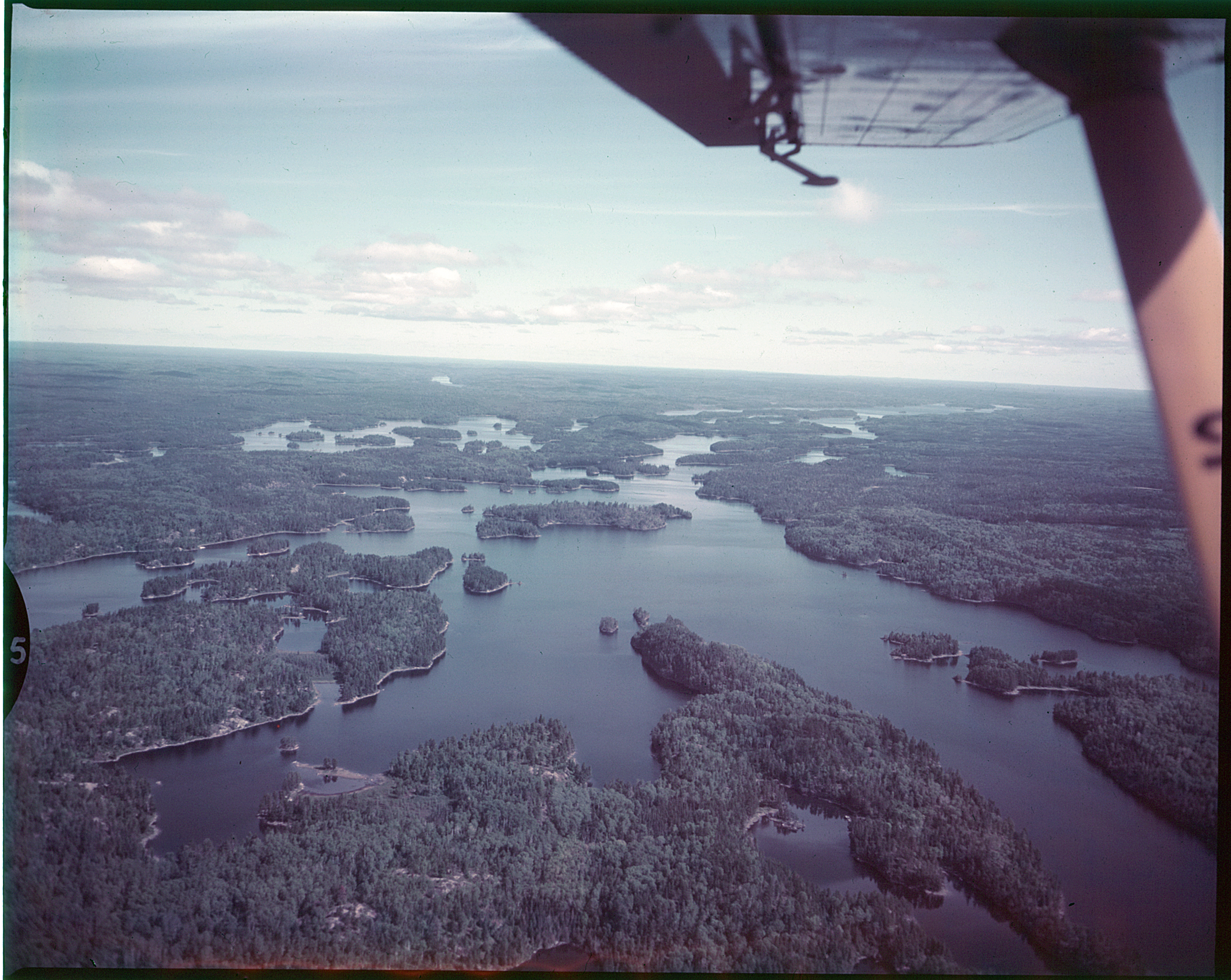
Aerial view of Quetico Provincial Park, 1958

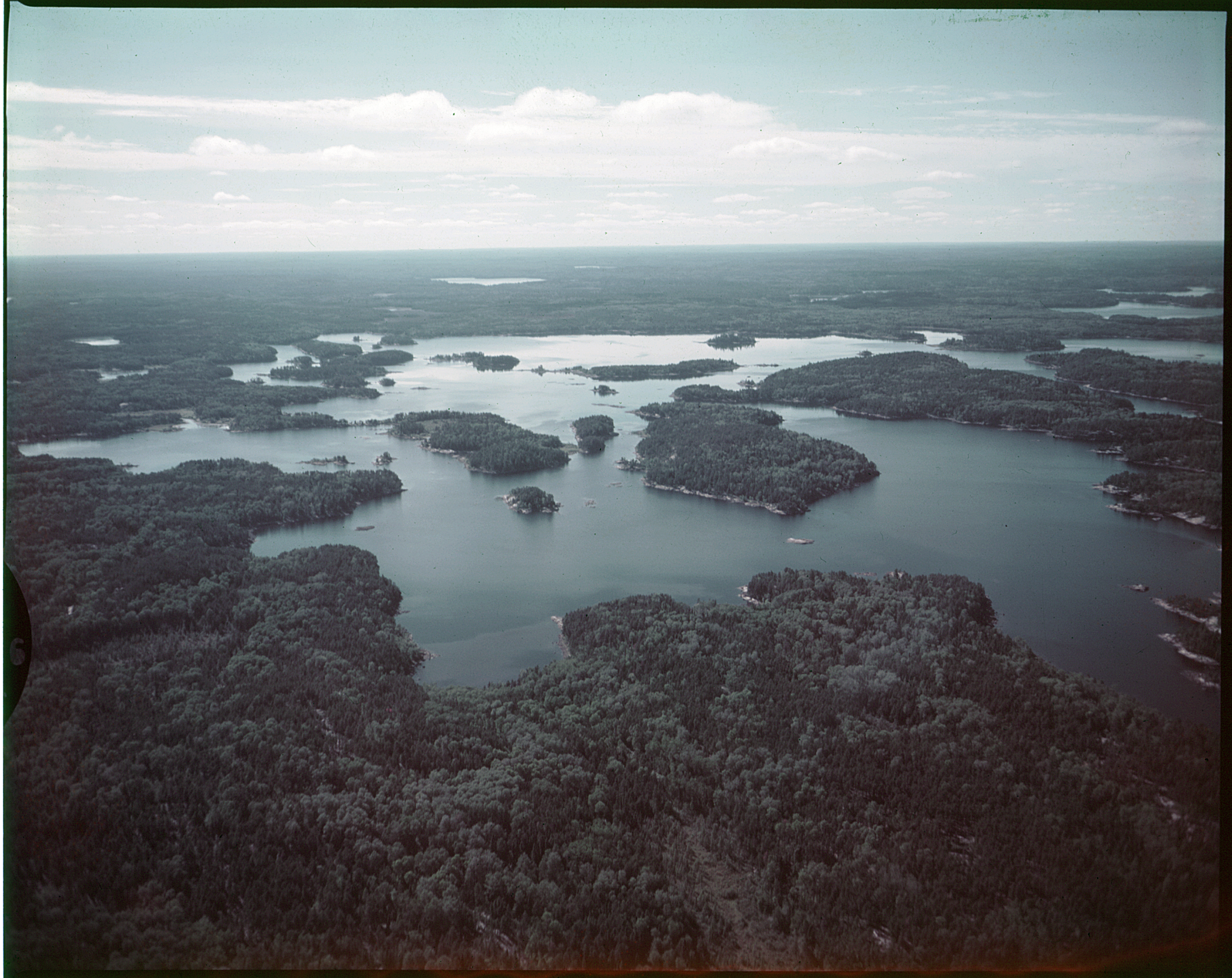
Aerial view of the lakes and forests of Quetico Provincial Park, 1958

== Northern Tier High Adventure ==
The park is used by the Boy Scouts of America as part of the Northern Tier High Adventure.

== See also ==
- Boundary Waters
- Boundary Waters Canoe Area Wilderness
- La Verendrye Provincial Park
- Lake Saganaga
- Voyageurs National Park
- Voyageurs
