= Sturgeon Lake (Goodhue County, Minnesota) =

Lake in the state of Minnesota, United States

- Location within Minnesota
- Location: Goodhue County, Minnesota
- Coordinates: 44°38′28″N 92°38′19″W
- Type: lake

Sturgeon Lake is a lake in Goodhue County, in the U.S. state of Minnesota.

Sturgeon Lake was named for the shovelnose sturgeon in its waters.

== See also ==
- List of lakes in Minnesota
