= USS Sturgeon =

USS Sturgeon has been the name of three submarines of the United States Navy:

- USS Sturgeon (SS-25) was renamed USS E-2 (SS-25) in 1911; E-2 was commissioned in 1912 and scrapped in 1922.
- USS Sturgeon (SS-187), a Salmon-class submarine, was commissioned in 1938 and scrapped in 1948.
- USS Sturgeon (SSN-637), the lead ship of the Sturgeon class, was commissioned in 1967 and scrapped in 1994.
