= Hunter Island (Ontario) =

Land mass in Ontario, Canada

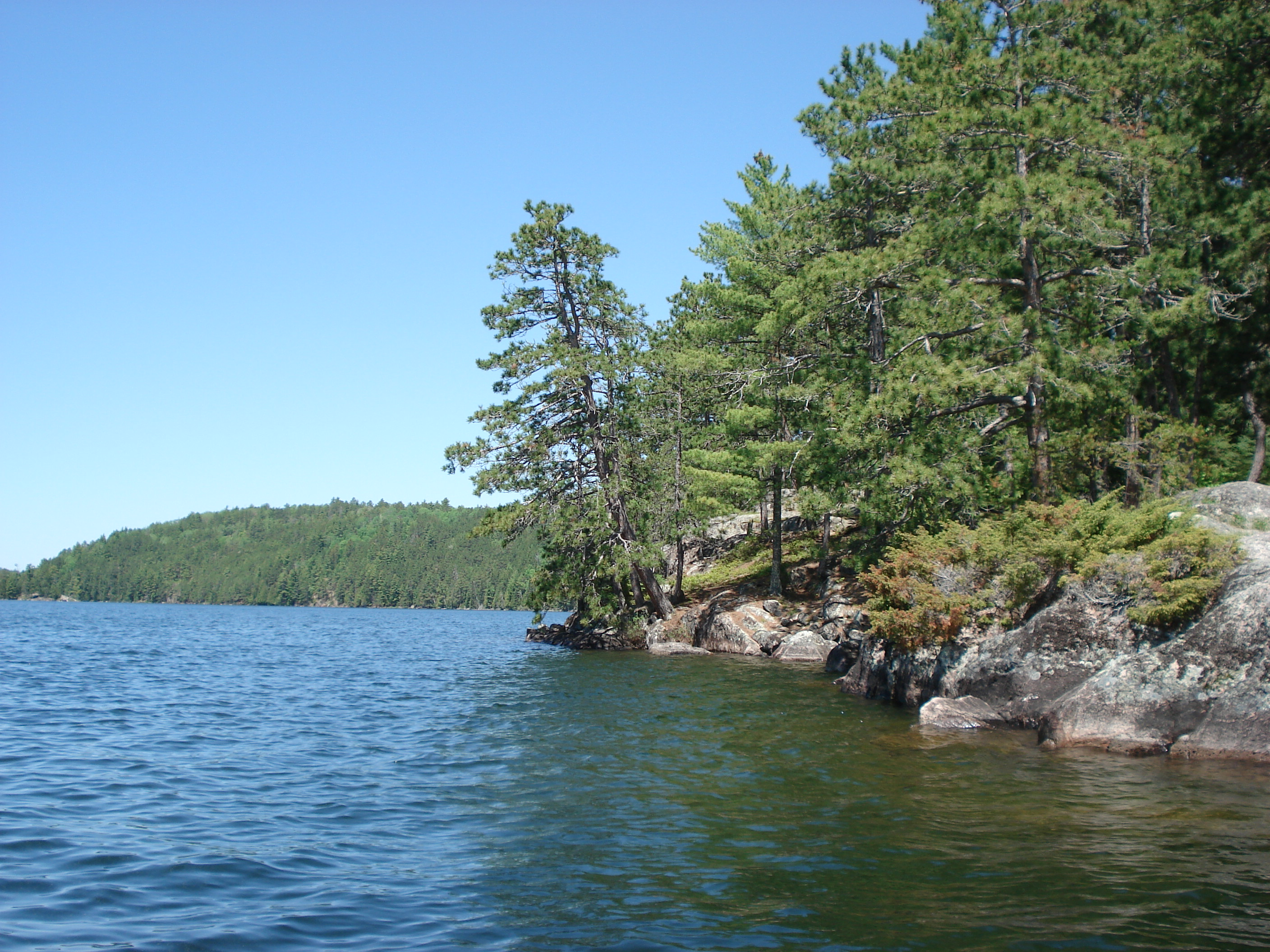
One of several unnamed islands in Sarah Lake, one of the larger lakes of the Hunter Island region of Quetico Provincial Park, Ontario, Canada

Hunter Island, or Hunters Island, is a large land mass — now known not to be an actual island — which occupies the area between the two most historically significant fur trade waterway routes in northern Ontario, Canada: the Kaministiquia and the Grand Portage. It is an area of large, remote and windy lakes and is now the southern half of the Quetico Provincial Park.

== Geography ==
Hunter Island is bounded to the south by Ottertrack, Knife, and Basswood lakes on the international Canada–United States border, to the east by Saganaga Lake, to the north by Kawnipi and Sturgeon lakes, and on the west by the Maligne River. With the Saganaga-Maligne drainage to the east and north and the Basswood drainage to the south and west, Hunter Island can be thought of as a peninsula connected to the United States across the 90-rod (450-metre) Monument Portage between Swamp and Ottertrack Lakes. The "island" is approximately 45 miles (72 kilometres) across at its maximum east–west extent and about 32 miles (51 km) north to south.

== History ==
A very early French map of the region indicates Iles des Chasseurs ("Isles of the Hunters") for the area now called Hunter Island.

In the 1890s, the Hunter Island region was the focus of a boundary dispute between the United States and Canada, owing to the millions of tons of iron ore in the area. The controversy was settled in favour of Canada.

== Canoeing ==
A canoe loop circumnavigating Hunter Island measures over 200 miles (320 km) and normally takes at least twelve days to complete. It passes through some of the busiest access points to the park and wilderness areas as well as many notable natural and historical features.

== Lakes of the Hunter Island region ==
- Agnes Lake
- Kahshahpiwi Lake
- Kawnipi Lake
- Saganaga Lake
- Sarah Lake
- McIntyre Lake
- Brent Lake
- Basswood Lake
- Sturgeon Lake (Quetico)
