= Sylvester Sturgeon =

English cricketer

Personal information
- Full name: Sylvester Murley Sturgeon
- Born: 12 August 1886; Stoke Newington, London, England
- Died: 1 May 1930 (aged 43); Chester, Cheshire, England
- Batting: Unknown
- Role: Wicket-keeper

Domestic team information
- Years: Team
- 1922–1923: Scotland

Career statistics
Competition	First-class
Matches	2
Runs scored	1
Batting average	0.33
100s/50s	–/–
Top score	1
Catches/stumpings	5/1
- Source: Cricinfo, 5 November 2022

Sylvester Murley Sturgeon (12 August 1886 – 1 May 1930) was an English first-class cricketer of Scottish-descent.

Sturgeon was born at Stoke Newington in August 1886. A club cricketer for Carlton, he made two appearances in first-class cricket for Scotland against Surrey at The Oval on Scotland's 1922 tour of England, and against Wales at Perth in 1923. Playing as a wicket-keeper in the Scottish side, the took five catches and made a single stumping. Sturgeon later became commercial traveller based in Redland, Bristol. He was summoned before Nailsworth Police Court in October 1929, having been found drunk while in charge of a motor vehicle, having reversed his car through a shop window; he was subsequently fined £3 plus £2 costs, and banned from driving for 12 months. Sturgeon died the following year, in May 1930 at the Boston Hotel in Chester.
