= Spurgeon =

Spurgeon may refer to:

== Places ==
=== United States ===
- Spurgeon, Indiana, a town
- Spurgeon, Missouri, an unincorporated community
- Spurgeon, Tennessee, a census-designated place
- Spurgeon Creek, Washington

=== Australia ===
- Spurgeon, Queensland, a locality

== People with the given name ==
- Spud Chandler (1907–1990), American Major League Baseball pitcher
- Spurgeon Cherry (c. 1912–1968), American college football and basketball player and basketball coach
- Spurgeon Neel (1919–2003), U.S. Army physician
- Spurgeon Tucker (1894–1968), American painter and lithographer

== People with the surname ==
- Adelaide Thompson Spurgeon (c.1826–1907), American Civil War nurse
- Caroline Spurgeon (1869–1942), English literary critic
- Charles Spurgeon (1834–1892), British Baptist preacher
- Dennis Spurgeon (born 1943), American nuclear engineer
- Freddy Spurgeon (1900–1970), American baseball player
- Jared Spurgeon (born 1989), Canadian ice hockey player
- Jay Spurgeon (born 1976), American baseball player
- Keith Spurgeon (1933–1990), English football player and manager
- Samuel J. W. Spurgeon (1861–?), American minister, publisher, and editor
- Sarah Spurgeon (born 1963), English electrical engineer
- Thomas Spurgeon (1856–1917), son of Charles Spurgeon; also a British Baptist preacher
- Tim Spurgeon (born 1960), American racing driver
- Tom Spurgeon (1968–2019), American comic critic
- Tyler Spurgeon (born 1986), Canadian ice hockey player
- William H. Spurgeon (1829–1915), founder of Santa Ana, California

== Other uses ==
- Spurgeons, an English charity founded by Charles Spurgeon
- Spurgeon's College, London, founded by Charles Spurgeon

== See also ==
- O. Spurgeon English (1901–1993), American psychiatrist and psychoanalyst
- Spergon Wynn (born 1978), former football quarterback
