= List of county roads in Lake County, Minnesota =

- Standard county road marker

- Map of Lake County with county roads highlighted County State-Aid Highways County Roads

Highway names
- Interstates: Interstate X (I-X)
- US Highways: U.S. Highway X (US X)
- State: Trunk Highway X (MN X or TH X)
- County State-Aid Highways: County State-Aid Highway X (CSAH X)
- County Roads: County Road X (CR X)

System links
- County roads of Minnesota; Lake County

The following is an incomplete list of county-maintained roads in Lake County, Minnesota, United States.

== CR 2-CR 199 ==
County Road 2 is a county route, which runs from MN 61 to MN 1. County Road 2 is officially known as Fourth Street in central Two Harbors and such denotation lasts until the edges of town, near and around 25th Avenue. From this point, County Road 2 also has the name Forest Highway 15 in reference to the United States Forest Service. County Road 2 is mostly a rural, two lane highway, although it does cross three railroads: the Canadian National and two mining company lines, the Northshore, and the LTV.

County Road 3

County Road 4

County Road 5

County Road 6 is a county route, which runs from Highway 1 in Finland to Highway 61 in Little Marais. County Road 6 is known as Little Marais Road. County Road 6 serves as the entrance to Wolf Ridge Environmental Learning Center.

County Road 7

County Road 8

County Road 9 is a county route, which runs from an intersection with County Route 61 in Two Harbors to the Saint Louis County line, where the route continues as Saint Louis County Road 42. The route is known as Stanley Road for its entire length.

County Road 10

County Road 11

County Road 12

County Road 14

County Road 15

County Road 16 is a route that begins at MN 1.

County Road 17

County Road 18

County Road 24

County Road 25

County Road 26

County Road 27

County Road 28

County Road 31

County Road 32

County Road 34

County Road 38

County Road 61 is a county route, which runs from the intersection of Minnesota 61 Expressway and North Shore Scenic Drive in Two Harbors, Minnesota, and follows the North Shore Scenic Drive to Duluth on Saint Louis County Road 61, passing through the communities of Larsmont and Knife River in Lake County. County 61 is more commonly known and signed as North Shore Scenic Drive between Duluth and Two Harbors and is also known as Scenic 61. County Road 61 (between Duluth and Two Harbors) was commissioned as U.S. 61 in 1926, ready for use by 1929, and paved by 1940. Until the expressway between Duluth and Two Harbors was constructed inland in the 1960s, County Road 61 (then U.S. 61) had served as the principal route between Duluth and Two Harbors. Formerly known as U.S. 61, the state turned over management of the road to Saint Louis and Lake counties in the 1960s and the two counties then designated the route "County Road 61". The course for Grandma's Marathon follows this road route annually in June.

County Road 100

County Road 101

County Road 102

County Road 106

County Road 111

County Road 121

County Road 122

County Road 123

County Road 124

County Road 131

County Road 132

County Road 141

County Road 151

== CR 200-CR 599 ==
County Road 200N is a short route that begins at County Road 2 and is the entrance to the Louisiana Pacific. The route travels west and terminates at a 4 way stop with County Road 200E, 7th St and the Louisiana Pacific entrance. The route is known as 25th Ave.

County Road 200E

County Road 200S

County Road 200W

County Road 202

County Road 203

County Road 204

County Road 301

County Road 302

== CR 600 and up ==
County Road 702 is a route that begins at MN 1 and terminates at a dead end in Stony River Township.

County Road 704 is a route begins at MN 1 and terminates at a dead end in Stony River Township.

County Road 705

Highway names
- Interstates: Interstate X (I-X)
- US Highways: U.S. Highway X (US X)
- State: Trunk Highway X (MN X or TH X)
- County State-Aid Highways: County State-Aid Highway X (CSAH X)
- County Roads: County Road X (CR X)

System links
- County roads of Minnesota; Lake County

The following is a list of county-maintained roads in Lake County, Minnesota, United States. Some of the routes included in this list are also county-state-aid-highways (CSAH.)

== Route list ==
Number	Length (mi)	Length (km)	Southern or western terminus	Northern or eastern terminus	Local names	Formed	Removed	Notes
CSAH 2	—	—	MN 61 in Two Harbors	MN 1 in Stony River Township		—	—	
CSAH 3	—	—	MN 61 in Silver Creek Township	CSAH 4 in Beaver Bay Township		—	—	
CSAH 4	—	—	MN 61 in Beaver Bay	CSAH 15 and CSAH 31 in Beaver Bay Township		—	—	
CSAH 5	—	—	CSAH 4 in Beaver Bay Township	MN 61 in Silver Bay		—	—	
CSAH 6	—	—	MN 1 in Crystal Bay Township	MN 61 in Lake County Unorganized Territory, Number 1		—	—	
CSAH 7	—	—	MN 1 in Crystal Bay Township	Wanless Trail in Lake County Unorganized Territory, Number 1		—	—	
CSAH 8	—	—	CSAH 7 in Lake County Unorganized Territory, Number 1	Cook County line (County 1)		—	—	
CSAH 9	—	—	St. Louis County line (County 42)	CSAH 61 in Lake County Unorganized Territory, Number 2		—	—	
CSAH 10	—	—	CSAH 9 in Lake County Unorganized Territory, Number 2	CSAH 11 in Lake County Unorganized Territory, Number 2		—	—	
CSAH 11	—	—	St. Louis County line (County 41)	MN 61 in Two Harbors		—	—	
CSAH 12	—	—	CSAH 11 in Lake County Unorganized Territory, Number 2	CSAH 2 in Lake County Unorganized Territory, Number 2		—	—	
CSAH 14	—	—	St. Louis County line (County 55)	CSAH 2 in Lake County Unorganized Territory, Number 2		—	—	
CSAH 15	—	—	St. Louis County line (County 16)	CSAH 4 and CSAH 31 in Beaver Bay Township		—	—	
CSAH 16	—	—	MN 1 in Fall Lake Township	St. Louis County line (County 58)		—	—	
CSAH 17	—	—	CSAH 16 in Fall Lake Township	MN 169 in Fall Lake Township		—	—	
CSAH 18	—	—	MN 169 in Fall Lake Township	Dead End in Fall Lake Township		—	—	
CSAH 24	—	—	CSAH 2 in Silver Creek Township	CSAH 3 in Silver Creek Township		—	—	
CSAH 25	—	—	MN 61 in Lake County Unorganized Territory, Number 2	CSAH 61 in Lake County Unorganized Territory, Number 2		—	—	
CSAH 26	—	—	MN 61 in Two Harbors	CSAH 2 in Two Harbors		—	—	
CSAH 27	—	—	MN 61 in Two Harbors	CSAH 12 in Lake County Unorganzied Territory, Number 2		—	—	
CSAH 28	—	—	CSAH 11 in Lake County Unorganized Territory, Number 2	CSAH 27 in Two Harbors		—	—	
CSAH 31	—	—	CSAH 4 and CSAH 15 in Beaver Bay Township	MN 1 in Crystal Bay Township		—	—	
CSAH 32	—	—	CSAH 5 in Silver Bay	CSAH 5 in Silver Bay		—	—	
CSAH 34	—	—	St. Louis County line (County 70)	MN 1 in Stony River Township		—	—	
CSAH 61	—	—	St. Louis County line (County 61)	MN 61 in Two Harbors		—	—	
CR 100	—	—	MN 61 in Silver Creek Township	Dead End in Silver Creek Township		—	—	
CR 101	—	—	CSAH 61 in Lake County Unorganized Territory, Number 2	CSAH 61 in Lake County Unorganized Territory, Number 2		—	—	
CR 102	—	—	MN 61 in Lake County Unorganized Territory, Number 2	Dead End in Lake County Unorganized Territory, Number 2		—	—	
CR 103	—	—	St. Louis County line	MN 61 in Lake County Unorganized Territory, Number 2		—	—	
CR 106	—	—	Dead End in Silver Creek Township	MN 61 in Silver Creek Township		—	—	
CR 108	—	—	CR 102 in Lake County Unorganized Territory, Number 2	Dead End in Lake County Unorganized Territory, Number 2		—	—	
CR 109	—	—	Dead End in Lake County Unorganized Territory, Number 2	CR 108 in Lake County Unorganized Territory, Number 2		—	—	
CR 111	—	—	CSAH 11 in Lake County Unorganized Territory, Number 2	CSAH 2 in Lake County Unorganized Territory, Number 2		—	—	
CR 121	—	—	CSAH 27 in Lake County Unorganized Territory, Number 2	CSAH 12 in Lake County Unorganized Territory, Number 2		—	—	
CR 122	—	—	CSAH 12 in Lake County Unorganized Territory, Number 2	East Waldo Road in Lake County Unorganized Territory, Number 2		—	—	
CR 123	—	—	CSAH 12 in Lake County Unorganzied Territory, Number 2	CR 131 in Lake County Unorganized Territory, Number 2		—	—	
CR 124	—	—	CSAH 12 in Lake County Unorganized Territory, Number 2	CSAH 12 in Lake County Unorganized Territory, Number 2		—	—	
CR 131	—	—	CR 124 in Lake County Unorganized Territory, Number 2	Dead End in Lake County Unorganized Territory, Number 2		—	—	
CR 132	—	—	CR 124 in Lake County Unorganized Territory, Number 2	Dead End in Lake County Unorganized Territory, Number 2		—	—	
CR 141	—	—	CSAH 14 in Lake County Unorganized Territory, Number 2	Dead End in Lake County Unorganized Territory, Number 2		—	—	
CR 151	—	—	St. Louis County line	CSAH 15 in Lake County Unorganized Territory, Number 2		—	—	
CR 200	—	—	CSAH 26 in Two Harbors	CSAH 2 in Lake County Unorganized Territory, Number 2		—	—	Segment 1
CR 200	—	—	CSAH 26 in Two Harbors	CSAH 2 in Lake County Unorganized Territory, Number 2		—	—	Segment 2
CR 202	—	—	Dead End in Lake County Unorganized Territory, Number 2	CSAH 2 in Silver Creek Township		—	—	
CR 203	—	—	CSAH 2 in Silver Creek Township	Kane Lake Road in Silver Creek Township		—	—	
CR 204	—	—	CSAH 2 in Silver Creek Township	CSAH 15 in Silver Creek Township		—	—	
CR 301	—	—	CSAH 3 in Silver Creek Township	CSAH 24 in Silver Creek Township		—	—	
CR 302	—	—	CR 131 in Lake County Unorganized Territory, Number 2	Briton Pit Road in Lake County Unorganized Territory, Number 2		—	—	
CR 701	—	—	Breezy Lane in Crystal Bay Township	MN 1 in Crystal Bay Township		—	—	
