= Murphy City, Minnesota =

Unincorporated community in Minnesota, United States

- Unincorporated community
- Location within Minnesota Location within the United States
- Coordinates: 47°30′35″N 91°19′29″W
- Country: United States
- State: Minnesota
- County: Lake
- Township: Stony River
- Elevation: 1,880 ft (570 m)

Population
  - Total: 30
- Time zone: UTC-6 (Central (CST))
  - Summer (DST): UTC-5 (CDT)
- ZIP code: 55603
- Area code: 218
- GNIS feature ID: 657535

Murphy City is an unincorporated community in Stony River Township, Lake County, Minnesota, United States; located within the Finland State Forest.

The community is located 19 miles north of Silver Bay at the intersection of Minnesota State Highway 1 and Hart Street.

Murphy City is located within the southeast corner of Stony River Township.
