= Castle Danger, Minnesota =

Unincorporated community in Minnesota, United States

- Unincorporated community
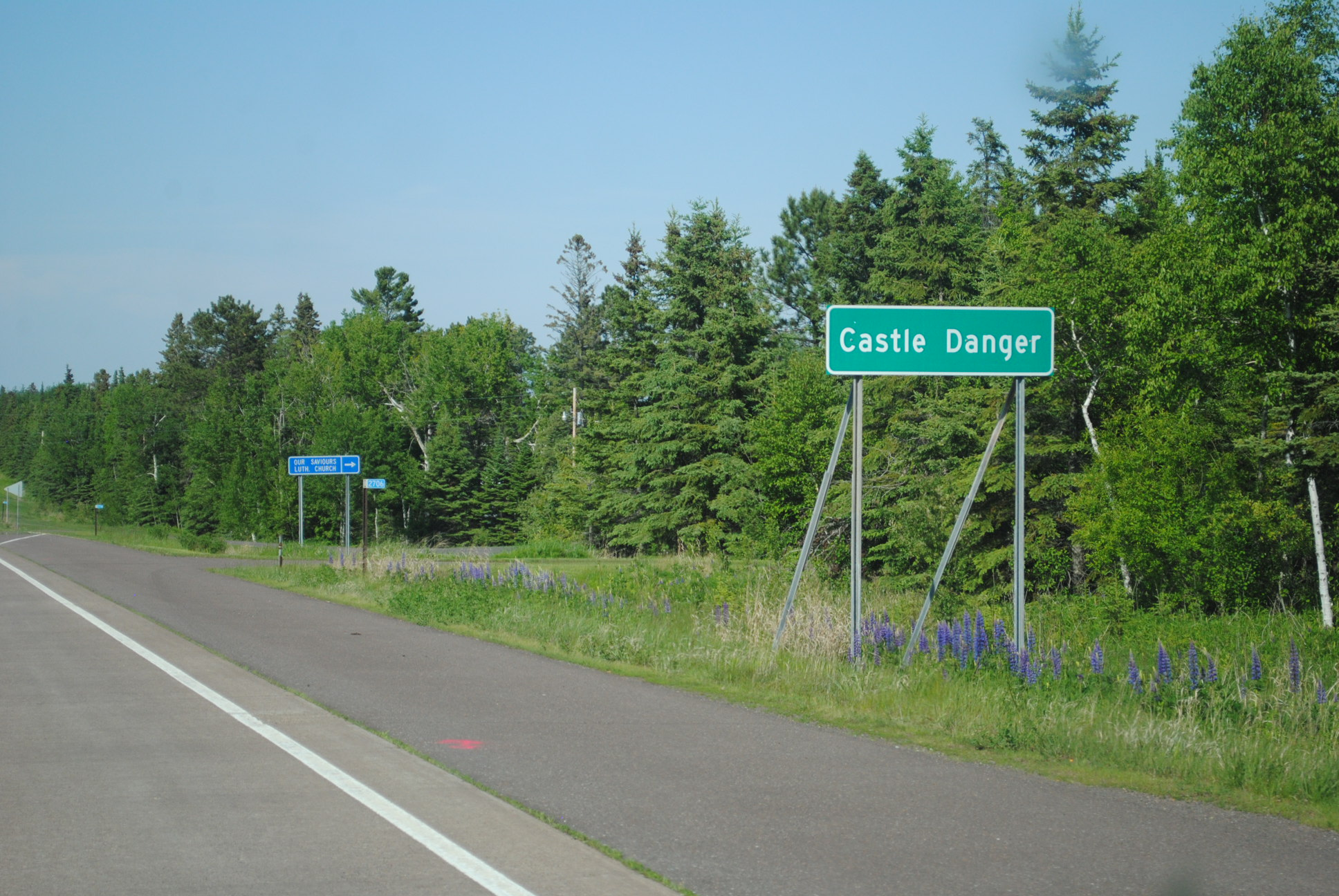
- Signpost for Castle Danger

- Location within Minnesota Location within the United States
- Coordinates: 47°07′15″N 91°30′12″W
- Country: United States
- State: Minnesota
- County: Lake
- Township: Silver Creek
- Elevation: 627 ft (191 m)

Population
  - Total: 30
- Time zone: UTC-6 (Central (CST))
  - Summer (DST): UTC-5 (CDT)
- ZIP code: 55616
- Area code: 218
- GNIS feature ID: 640967

Castle Danger is an unincorporated community in Silver Creek Township, Lake County, Minnesota, United States.

The community is located between Two Harbors and Beaver Bay on Minnesota Highway 61, on the North Shore of Lake Superior.

Castle Danger is located 11 miles northeast of the city of Two Harbors. Gooseberry Falls State Park is nearby.

== History ==
Castle Danger was settled in 1890, by three Norwegian fishermen (brothers Dan, Marc, and Tom Lind), although the site was already occupied by lumber companies. The exact origin of the name is unknown, although it might have come from the cliffs on the shore resembling a castle, from a boat named Castle that grounded here, or from the Walter Scott novel Castle Dangerous (1831).
