= Sawbill Landing, Minnesota =

Unincorporated community in Minnesota, United States

- Unincorporated community
- Location within Minnesota Location within the United States
- Coordinates: 47°42′55″N 91°16′05″W
- Country: United States
- State: Minnesota
- County: Lake
- Township: Crystal Bay
- Elevation: 1,693 ft (516 m)
- Time zone: UTC-6 (Central (CST))
  - Summer (DST): UTC-5 (CDT)
- Area code: 218
- GNIS feature ID: 658170

Sawbill Landing is an unincorporated community in Lake County, Minnesota, United States; located 10 miles northeast of Isabella.

The center of Sawbill Landing is generally considered at the intersection of Sawbill Landing Road and Dumbbell Road; which is also near the boundary line between Crystal Bay Township and Stony River Township.

Forest Roads 173, 174, and 369 intersect at Sawbill Landing. Sylvania Lake is in the vicinity.

Sawbill Landing is located within the Superior National Forest.
