= Little Isabella River =

- Mouth of Little Isabella River

Location
- Country: United States
- State: Minnesota
- County: Lake County

Physical characteristics
- Source
  - coordinates: 47.6076855°N 91.3362608°W
- Mouth
  - coordinates: 47.8040688°N 91.4548569°W
- Length: 33.17 mi (53.38 km)

Basin features
- River system: Isabella River

The Little Isabella River is a 33.17 mi (53.38 km) stream in Superior National Forest, a United States National Forest in the U.S. state of Minnesota. The stream runs through Stony River Township, which is part of Lake County. The Little Isabella River Campground, which is operated by the United States Forest Service, is about 5 miles (8.0 km) north of Isabella, Minnesota, an unincorporated community. The Minnesota Department of Natural Resources has designated it as a trout stream and it is populated with Brook trout.

== See also ==
- List of rivers of Minnesota
- List of longest streams of Minnesota
- Arrowhead Region
- Lake Superior
