= East Beaver Bay, Minnesota =

Unincorporated community in Minnesota, United States

- Unincorporated community
- Location within Minnesota Location within the United States
- Coordinates: 47°16′04″N 91°16′59″W
- Country: United States
- State: Minnesota
- County: Lake
- Township: Beaver Bay
- Elevation: 663 ft (202 m)

Population
  - Total: 40
- Time zone: UTC-6 (Central (CST))
  - Summer (DST): UTC-5 (CDT)
- Area code: 218
- GNIS feature ID: 656085

East Beaver Bay is an unincorporated community in Beaver Bay Township, Lake County, Minnesota, United States.

The community is located between Beaver Bay and Silver Bay on Minnesota Highway 61, on the North Shore of Lake Superior.

East Beaver Bay is located 26 miles northeast of the city of Two Harbors.
