= Beaver River (Lake Superior) =

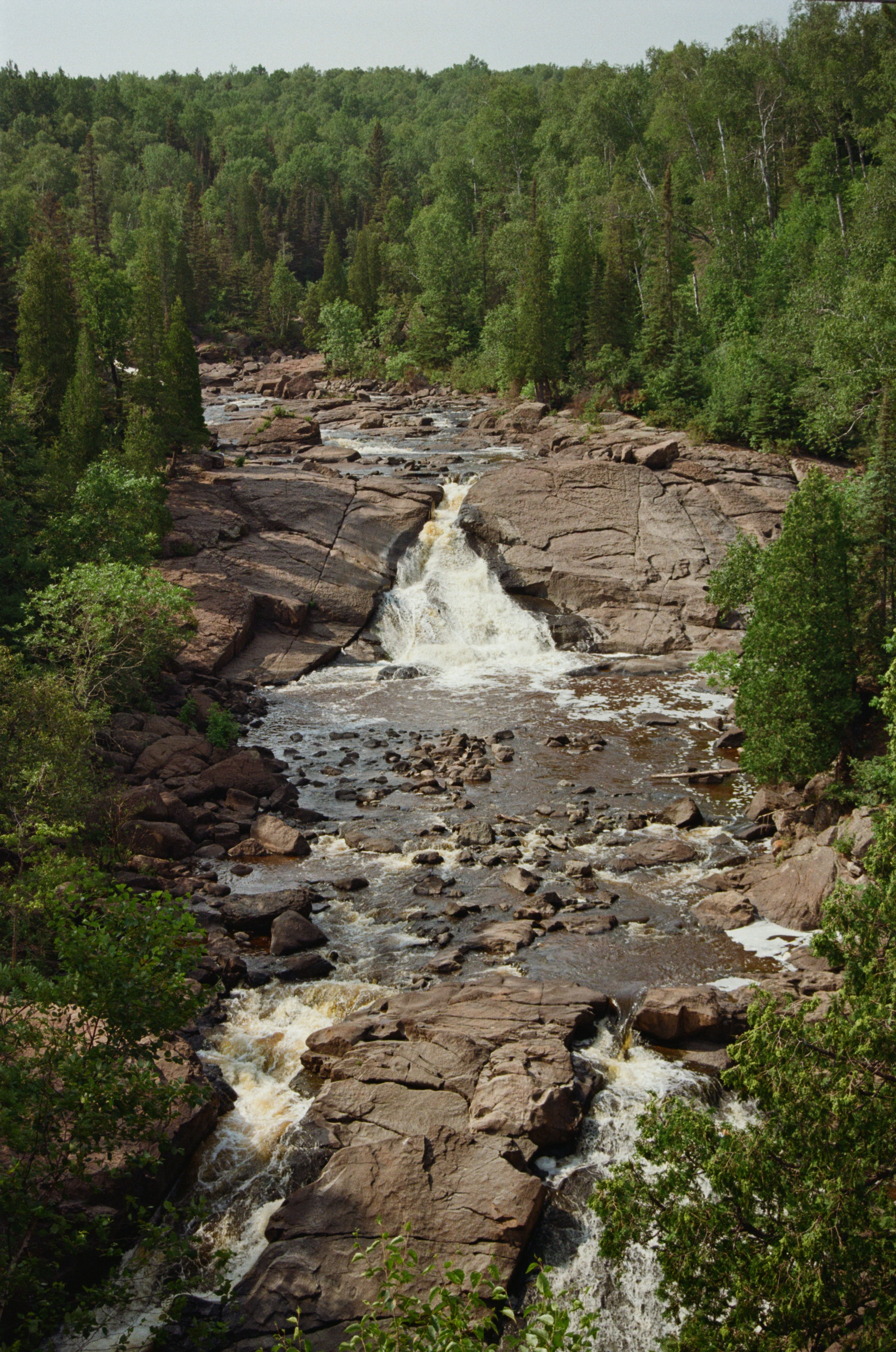
- The cascades and falls of the Beaver River near Beaver Bay, Minnesota.

- Mouth of the Beaver River
- Native name: Gaa-giizhikensikaag-ziibi (Ojibwe)

Location
- Country: United States
- State: Minnesota
- County: Lake County

Physical characteristics
- Source
  - location: Cloquet Lake
  - coordinates: 47.3921404°N 91.4737749°W
- Mouth
  - location: Silver Bay, Minnesota, Lake Superior
  - coordinates: 47.2590891°N 91.2929435°W
- Length: 23.4-mile-long (37.7 km)

Basin features
- Tributaries
  - left: East Branch Beaver River
  - right: Kit Creek, Big Thirty-Nine Creek

The Beaver River is a 23.4-mile-long (37.7 km) river in Lake County, Minnesota. It flows into Lake Superior.

Its name comes from the large number of beaver originally found in the area.

== Habitat ==
Portions of Beaver River are designated trout streams with populations of brook, brown, and rainbow trout.

== See also ==
- List of rivers of Minnesota
