= 14W =

#REDIRECT Fourteen Words

14W may refer to:

- Fourteen Words, reference to a racist slogan
- Isabella 14W, a weather station in Finland State Forest
- 14W, initial designation of Typhoon Muifa (2022) (among others)
- 14W, starting size for Plus-size clothing in the United States

== See also ==
- All pages mentioning 14W

{{disambig}}
