= Silver Creek, Minnesota =

Silver Creek, Minnesota may refer to:

- Silver Creek, Lake County, Minnesota, an unincorporated community in Lake County
- Silver Creek, Wright County, Minnesota, a census-designated place in Wright County
