= Section Thirty, Minnesota =

Unincorporated community in Minnesota, United States

- Unincorporated community
- Location within Minnesota Location within the United States
- Coordinates: 47°54′37″N 91°46′50″W
- Country: United States
- State: Minnesota
- County: Lake
- Township: Fall Lake
- Elevation: 1,398 ft (426 m)

Population
  - Total: 30
- Time zone: UTC-6 (Central (CST))
  - Summer (DST): UTC-5 (CDT)
- Area code: 218
- GNIS feature ID: 658215

Section Thirty is an unincorporated community in Fall Lake Township, Lake County, Minnesota, United States, located four miles east of Ely and two miles southeast of Winton. It takes its name from the survey section of the survey township in which it is located.

The center of Section Thirty is generally considered to be at the intersection of Lake County Road 17 (Thirteen Corners Road) and Lake County Road 16 (Section Thirty Road / Kawishiwi Trail).

Minnesota State Highway 169 is nearby. Garden Lake and White Iron Lake are in the vicinity.

Section Thirty is located within both the Superior National Forest and Bear Island State Forest.

The boundary line between Lake and Saint Louis counties is nearby, along the western edge of the section and township.
