= Alger, Minnesota =

Unincorporated community in Minnesota, United States

- Unincorporated community
- Location within Minnesota Location within the United States
- Coordinates: 47°08′50″N 91°41′34″W
- Country: United States
- State: Minnesota
- County: Lake
- Elevation: 1,444 ft (440 m)
- Time zone: UTC-6 (Central (CST))
  - Summer (DST): UTC-5 (CDT)
- ZIP code: 55616
- Area code: 218
- GNIS feature ID: 654565

Alger is an unincorporated community in Lake County, Minnesota, United States. It is nine miles north of Two Harbors, near the intersection of Lake County Highway 2 and Alger Grade, Township Road 24.

Alger, Minnesota gets its name from the old railway and logging company, Alger-Smith Lumber Company (which dissolved in 1919). The founder of that lumber company was former Michigan governor Russell Alexander Alger.

Alger is located near the boundary line between Silver Creek Township and Lake No. 2 Unorganized Territory of Lake County.

It is located within ZIP code 55616 based in Two Harbors.
