= Silver Bay Municipal Airport =

- IATA: none; ICAO: KBFW; FAA LID: BFW

Summary
- Airport type: Public
- Owner: City of Silver Bay
- Serves: Silver Bay, Minnesota
- Coordinates: 47°14′55″N 091°24′56″W

Map
- Location of airport in Minnesota / United States BFW (the United States)

Runways
| Direction | Length | | Surface |
| Direction | ft | m | Surface |
|---|---|---|---|
| 07/25 | 3,200 | 975 | Asphalt |

Statistics
- Based aircraft (2017): 7
- Sources: Minnesota DOT, FAA

Wayne Johnson Silver Bay Municipal Airport (ICAO: KBFW, FAA LID: BFW) was a city-owned public-use airport located close to Silver Bay, a city in Lake County, Minnesota, United States. This airport is included in the FAA's National Plan of Integrated Airport Systems 2017-2021, which categorizes it as a general aviation airport.

Although most U.S. airports use the same three-letter location identifier for the FAA and IATA, this airport is assigned BFW by the FAA but has no designation from the IATA.

As of May 31, 2018, the FAA indicated that Runway 07/25 is out of service permanently.

On 7 June, 2018, Silver Bay Municipal Airport closed for an indefinite period.

== See also ==
- List of airports in Minnesota
