= Isabella River (Minnesota) =

- Mouth of the Isabella River

Location
- Country: United States
- State: Minnesota
- County: Lake County

Physical characteristics
- Source
  - coordinates: 47.8076784°N 91.3159667°W
- Mouth
  - coordinates: 47.7987921°N 91.5268033°W

Basin features
- Progression: Isabella River→ Kawishiwi River→ Basswood Lake→ Basswood River→ Lac la Croix→ Namakan River→ Rainy Lake→ Rainy River→ Lake of the Woods
- Tributaries
  - left: Little Isabella River, Mitawan Creek

The Isabella River is a river of Minnesota.

== See also ==
- List of rivers of Minnesota
