= Tettegouche State Park =

United States historic place in Minnesota

- Tettegouche Camp Historic District
- U.S. National Register of Historic Places
- U.S. Historic district
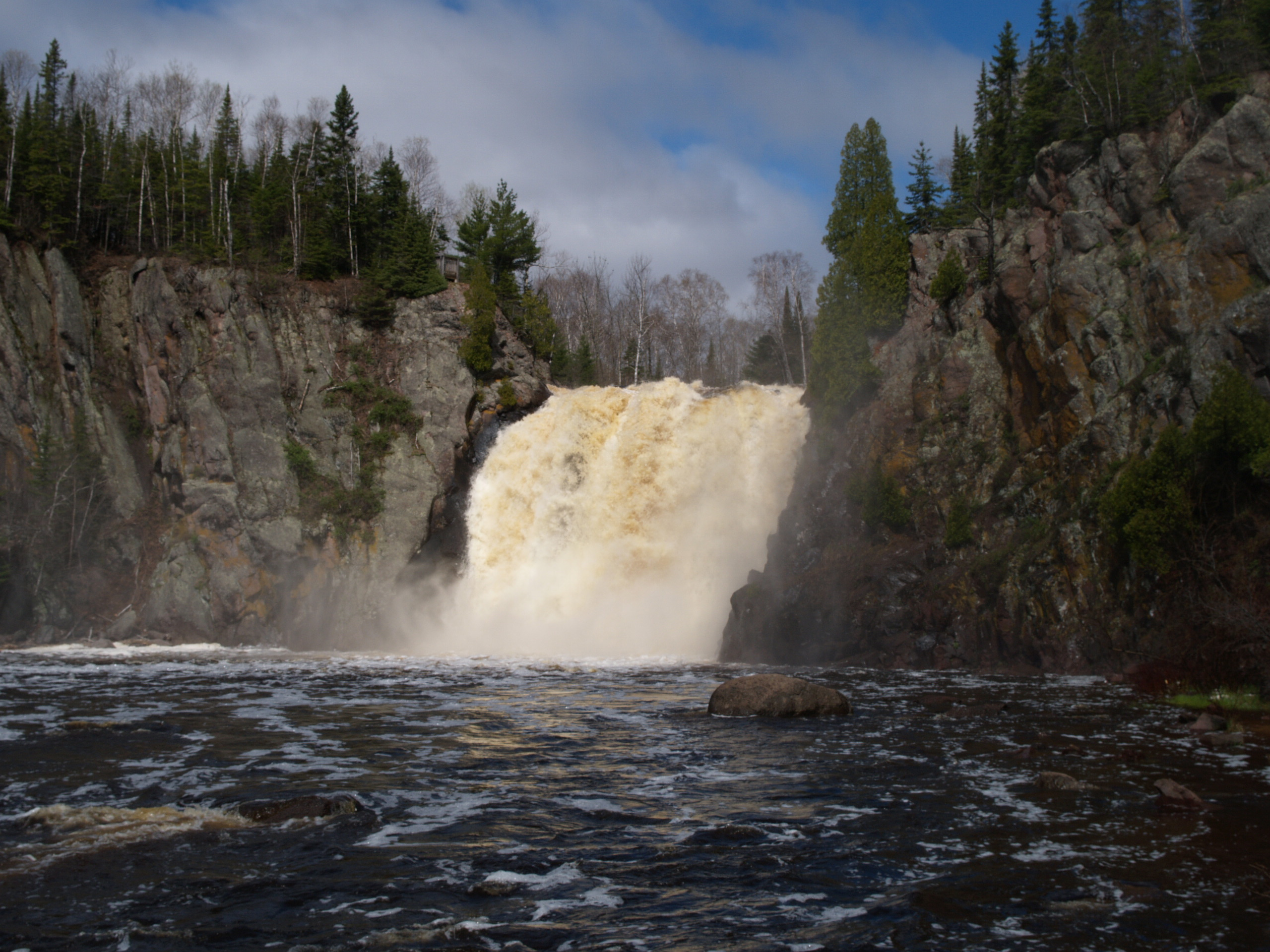
- Baptism River Falls

- Location within Minnesota Location within the United States
- Location: Off County Hwy. 4, Beaver Bay Township, Lake County, Minnesota
- Nearest city: Silver Bay, Minnesota
- Coordinates: 47°20′9″N 91°11′58″W
- NRHP reference No.: 88003084
- Added to NRHP: January 17, 1989

Tettegouche State Park (/ˈtɛtəɡuːtʃ/ TET-ə-gooch) is a Minnesota state park on the north shore of Lake Superior 58 miles (93 km) northeast of Duluth in Lake County on scenic Minnesota Highway 61. The park's name stems from the Tettegouche Club, an association of local businessmen which purchased the park in 1910 from the Alger-Smith Lumber Company. The club's members protected the area until its sale in 1971 to the deLaittres family. In 1979, the state of Minnesota acquired 3,400 acres (1,400 ha) from the Nature Conservancy, including Tettegouche Camp. The land was added to Baptism River State Park, which was renamed Tettegouche State Park.

== Features ==
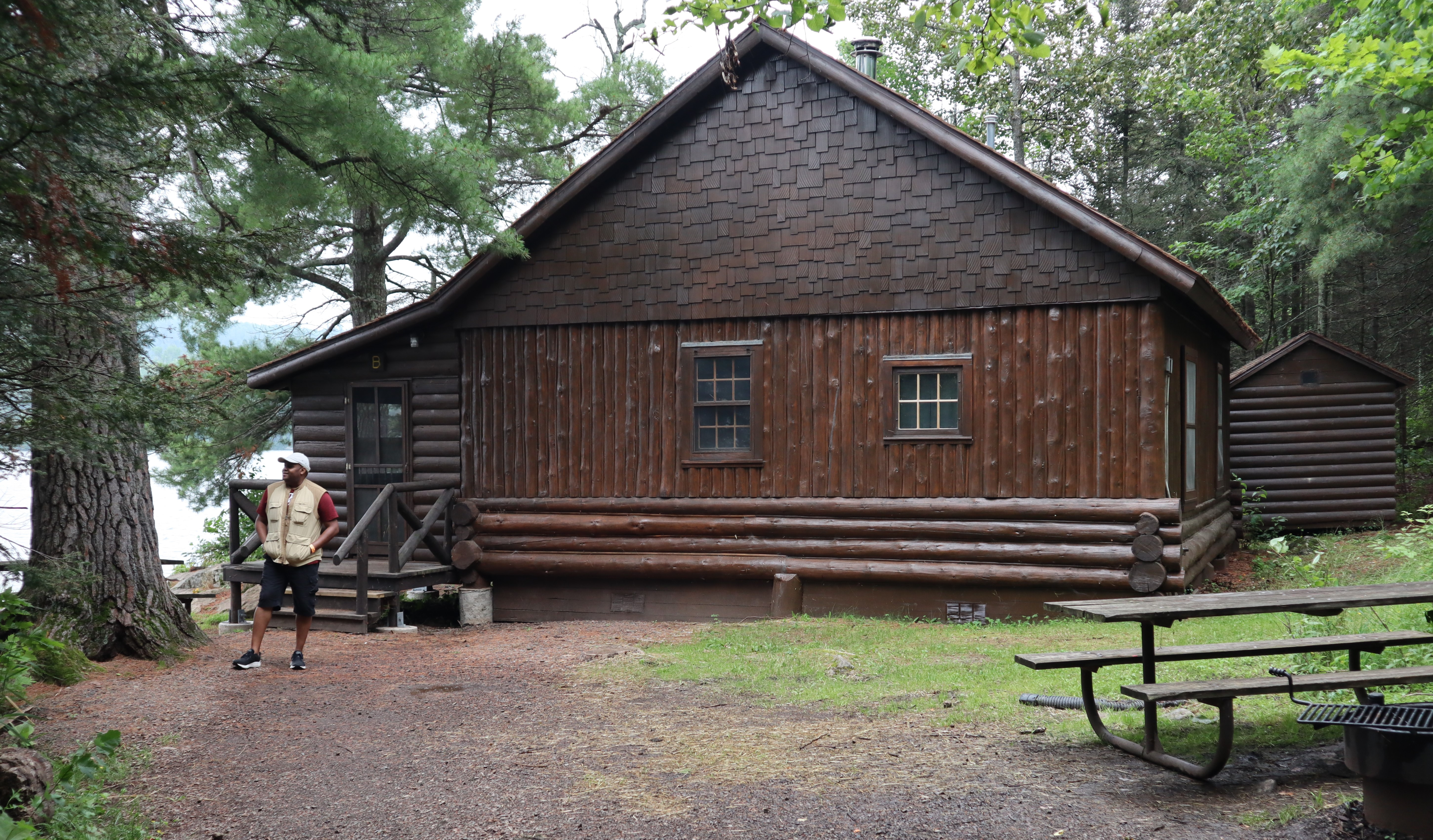
Cabin on Mic Mac Lake

The park is 9,346 acres (3,782 ha) and contains six inland lakes (four of which support northern pike and one supports walleye fishing), four waterfalls, and a beach on Lake Superior. The 70-foot-tall (21 m) waterfall High Falls located on the Baptism River is the highest waterfall located entirely within Minnesota. The park contains 22 miles (35 km) of hiking trails, 12 miles (19 km) of ski trails, and access to the Superior Hiking Trail. Tettegouche is bordered to the north by the Finland State Forest and shares the Red Dot motorized trail with it. The trail is for use by all-terrain vehicles and snowmobiles and is the only ATV trail in a state park.

The park is one of only four state parks in Minnesota offering rock climbing. Both Shovel Point and Palisade Head cliffs are popular spots offering climbing above the Lake Superior shore.

== Wildlife ==
Common wildlife seen at this park includes the white-tail deer, hawk, woodpecker, red squirrel, snowshoe hare, weasel, and beaver. Other wildlife that often roam in this park are Canadian lynx, moose, black bear, river otter, and red fox. On occasion, the timber wolf, coyote, fisher, marten and northern flying squirrel can be seen by visitors. The park also has peregrine falcons that nest in the cliffs along Lake Superior.

== Amenities ==
The park contains several camping areas, with drive-in, cart-in, walk-in and kayak-in sites. The Tettegouche Camp on Mic Mac Lake is listed on the National Register of Historic Places and features four hike-to cabins. One drive-up cabin is available at Illgen Falls. The parking lot at the entrance to the park also serves as a highway rest area, with a visitor center open year-round, electric vehicle (EV) charging stations, and restrooms and vending machines accessible 24 hours a day. The Baptism River Campground has campsites with and without electric hookups, and a heated building open year-round, with flush toilets and showers; it is the only Minnesota State Park with operational showers in winter. Firewood can be purchased at the park entrance year-round. Five picnic areas are also available with fire rings and tables.
