= Lake County Courthouse and Sheriff's Residence =

Historic government buildings in Minnesota, United States

- U.S. National Register of Historic Places
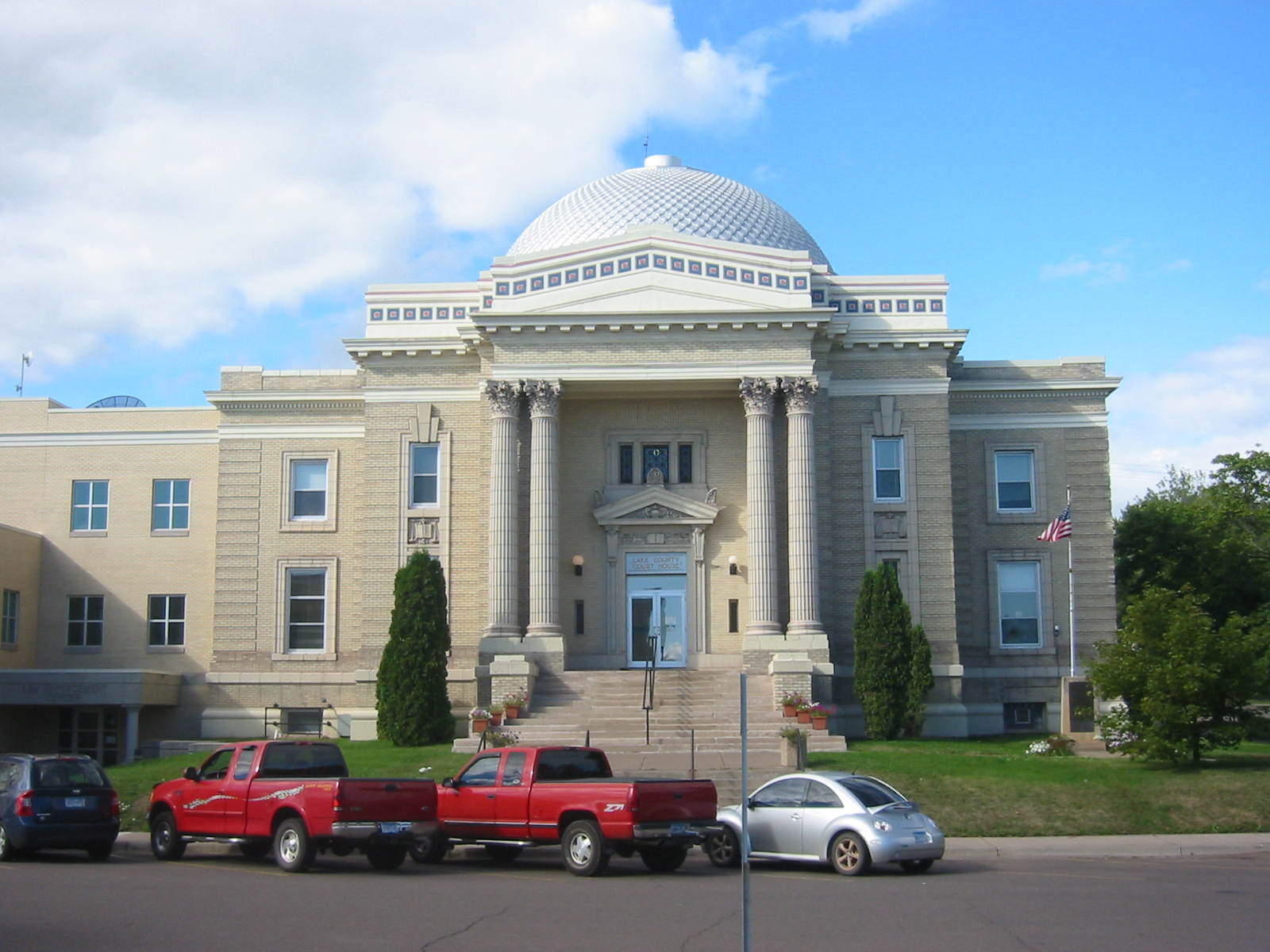

- Location within Minnesota Location within the United States
- Interactive map showing the location of Lake County Courthouse and Sheriff’s Residence
- Location: 601 3rd Ave., Two Harbors, Minnesota
- Coordinates: 47°1′19.7″N 91°40′17.3″W
- Area: less than one acre
- Built: 1906
- Architect: James MacLeod, Pastoret & Lunz
- Architectural style: Beaux Arts, Queen Anne style
- NRHP reference No.: 83000912
- Added to NRHP: February 24, 1983

The Lake County Courthouse and Sheriff's Residence, located at 601 3rd Avenue in Two Harbors, Lake County in the U.S. state of Minnesota was built in 1906. In 1888 a two-story brick sheriff's residence and jail was erected with an adjacent Queen Anne style courthouse. A 1904 fire destroyed the courthouse, but the jail and residence remained. The replacement building, designed in the Beaux Arts style by James Allen MacLeod, was built of brick and limestone, featuring quoin blocks, stone window surrounds with large keystones, dentil moulding, and four large columns supporting the entry overhang. The courtroom was topped with an open semi-circular dome covered with metallic scaled shakes. In 1945, the dome was enclosed from below. Axel Edward Soderberg was commissioned to paint murals depicting "Law and Justice", commerce, mining, and logging, at a cost of $1,500 in 1905. The jail and residence building were razed in the 1990s.
