= Silver Creek, Lake County, Minnesota =

Unincorporated community in Minnesota, United States

Silver Creek, Minnesota
- Unincorporated community
- Location within Minnesota Location within the United States
- Coordinates: 47°06′45″N 91°36′05″W
- Country: United States
- State: Minnesota
- County: Lake
- Township: Silver Creek
- Elevation: 981 ft (299 m)

Population
  - Total: 30
- Time zone: UTC-6 (Central (CST))
  - Summer (DST): UTC-5 (CDT)
- ZIP codes: 55616
- Area code: 218
- GNIS feature ID: 654943

Silver Creek is an unincorporated community in Silver Creek Township, Lake County, Minnesota, United States.

The community is located eight miles northeast of the city of Two Harbors at the intersection of Lake County Road 3 (Highway 3) and Township Road 32 (Town Road).

The community is located five miles inland from Lake Superior's North Shore along Lake County 3.
