= Isabella, Minnesota =

Unincorporated community in Minnesota, United States

- Unincorporated community
- Location within Minnesota Location within the United States
- Coordinates: 47°37′02″N 91°21′18″W
- Country: United States
- State: Minnesota
- County: Lake
- Township: Stony River
- Elevation: 1,923 ft (586 m)

Population
  - Total: 40
- Time zone: UTC-6 (Central (CST))
  - Summer (DST): UTC-5 (CDT)
- ZIP code: 55607
- Area code: 218
- GNIS feature ID: 656721

Isabella is a remote unincorporated community in Stony River Township, Lake County, Minnesota, United States.

The community is 27 miles (43 km) north of Silver Bay and 40 miles (64 km) southeast of Ely at the intersection of Minnesota State Highway 1 and Forest Road 172 (Wanless Road).

Isabella is within the Superior National Forest.

== Climate ==
According to the Köppen Climate Classification system, Isabella has a warm-summer humid continental climate, abbreviated "Dfb" on climate maps. The hottest temperature recorded in Isabella was 91 °F (32.8 °C) on July 3–4, 2020, while the coldest was −42 °F (−41.1 °C) on January 27 and January 31, 2019.

Climate data for Isabella, Minnesota, 1991–2020 normals, extremes 2009–2020
Month	Jan	Feb	Mar	Apr	May	Jun	Jul	Aug	Sep	Oct	Nov	Dec	Year
Record high °F (°C)	41 (5)	56 (13)	72 (22)	75 (24)	88 (31)	88 (31)	91 (33)	88 (31)	84 (29)	79 (26)	67 (19)	46 (8)	91 (33)
Mean daily maximum °F (°C)	16.1 (−8.8)	21.7 (−5.7)	34.3 (1.3)	47.8 (8.8)	62.7 (17.1)	71.4 (21.9)	76.2 (24.6)	74.8 (23.8)	65.0 (18.3)	50.2 (10.1)	34.0 (1.1)	21.9 (−5.6)	48.0 (8.9)
Daily mean °F (°C)	5.5 (−14.7)	9.2 (−12.7)	22.7 (−5.2)	36.5 (2.5)	50.6 (10.3)	59.9 (15.5)	64.5 (18.1)	62.8 (17.1)	54.2 (12.3)	41.0 (5.0)	26.4 (−3.1)	13.0 (−10.6)	37.2 (2.9)
Mean daily minimum °F (°C)	−5.2 (−20.7)	−3.3 (−19.6)	11.0 (−11.7)	25.1 (−3.8)	38.5 (3.6)	48.4 (9.1)	52.8 (11.6)	50.7 (10.4)	43.4 (6.3)	31.8 (−0.1)	18.7 (−7.4)	4.1 (−15.5)	26.3 (−3.1)
Record low °F (°C)	−42 (−41)	−40 (−40)	−35 (−37)	−10 (−23)	17 (−8)	27 (−3)	28 (−2)	25 (−4)	18 (−8)	12 (−11)	−21 (−29)	−42 (−41)	−42 (−41)
Average precipitation inches (mm)	0.94 (24)	0.87 (22)	1.54 (39)	2.08 (53)	3.17 (81)	4.26 (108)	4.06 (103)	3.27 (83)	3.54 (90)	3.10 (79)	1.91 (49)	1.21 (31)	29.95 (762)
Source 1: NOAA
Source 2: National Weather Service

== See also ==
- Little Isabella River
