= Finland, Minnesota =

Unincorporated community in Minnesota, US

- Census-designated place
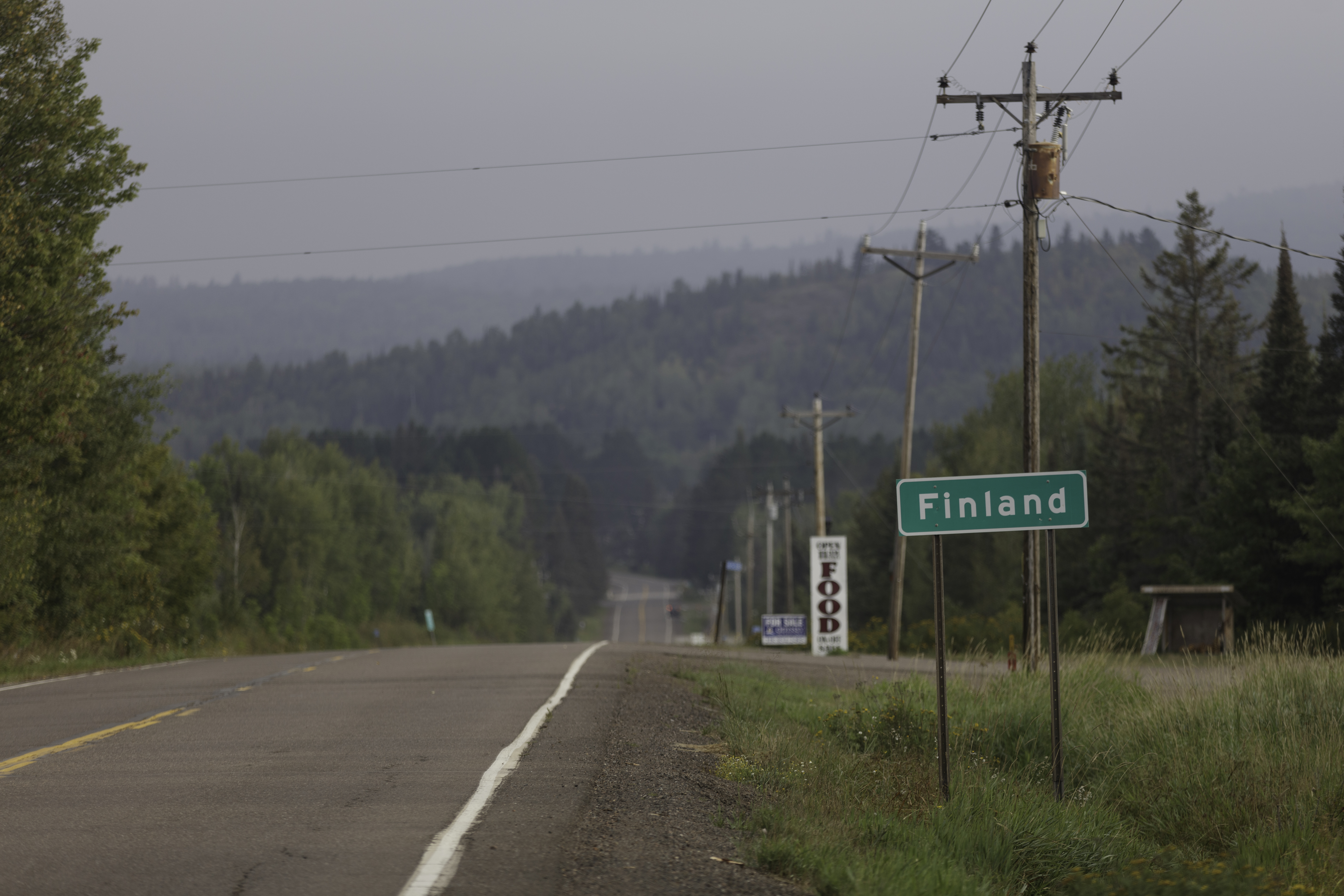
- Signpost for the community of Finland

- Location within Minnesota Location within the United States
- Coordinates: 47°24′53″N 91°14′57″W
- Country: United States
- State: Minnesota
- County: Lake
- Townships: Beaver Bay, Crystal Bay

Area
  - Total: 6.74 sq mi (17.46 km^{2})
  - Land: 6.72 sq mi (17.40 km^{2})
  - Water: 0.023 sq mi (0.06 km^{2})
- Elevation: 1,329 ft (405 m)

Population (2020)
  - Total: 215
  - Density: 32.0/sq mi (12.36/km^{2})
- Time zone: UTC-6 (CST)
  - Summer (DST): UTC-5 (CDT)
- ZIP code: 55603
- Area code: 218
- GNIS feature ID: 656231

Finland is an unincorporated community and census-designated place (CDP) in Crystal Bay and Beaver Bay townships, Lake County, Minnesota, United States. As of the 2020 census, its population was 195.

== Geography ==
The community of Finland is located 6 miles (10 km) inland from Lake Superior's North Shore and 39 miles (63 km) northeast of the city of Two Harbors. State Highway 1, County Road 6, and County Road 7 are three of the main routes in the community. State Highway 1 continues northwest from Finland 56 miles (90 km) to Ely.

According to the United States Census Bureau, the Finland CDP has a total area of 5.4 square miles (13.9 km^{2}), of which 0.02 square miles (0.06 km^{2}), or 0.41%, are water. The Baptism River flows through the community. George H. Crosby Manitou State Park is located 7 miles (11 km) northeast of Finland.

The community is located within the Finland State Forest in Lake County.

== History ==
Historical population
Census	Pop.	Note	%±
2010	195		—
2020	215		10.3%
U.S. Decennial Census; 2020 Census

A post office called Finland has been in operation since 1915, and a cooperative general store was established in 1913, which is Minnesota's longest continuously operated store. The name of the town comes from the fact that a large portion of the early settlers were Finns. The 1931 book Finlandssvenskarna i Amerika ('The Finland Swedes in America') describes the town's founding: "Two Finns, a Lindström and a Pelto, went out to the forest 40 miles north of Two Harbors a few years ago. They set about clearing forest and breaking ground. Later, a railroad was built through the new community and the place was named Finland."

The visitor center is the former home of forest ranger and longtime Finland resident O. M. Eckbeck, who built it in 1927.

The Lutheran church was struck by lightning on July 6, 2013, burning down as a result. It was later rebuilt.
