= Fall Lake Township, Lake County, Minnesota =

Fall Lake Township, Minnesota
- Township
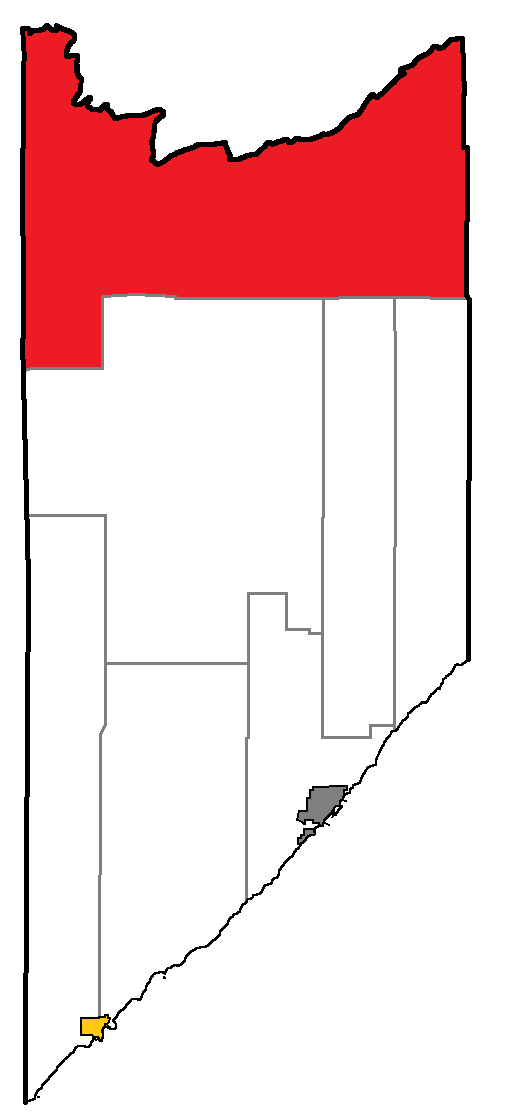
- Location of Fall Lake Township in Lake County, Minnesota
- Coordinates: 47°57′41″N 91°32′22″W
- Country: United States
- State: Minnesota
- County: Lake

Area
  - Total: 587.3 sq mi (1,521.2 km^{2})
  - Land: 456.8 sq mi (1,183.1 km^{2})
  - Water: 130.5 sq mi (338.1 km^{2})
- Elevation: 1,424 ft (434 m)

Population (2020)
  - Total: 630
  - Density: 1.4/sq mi (0.53/km^{2})
- Time zone: UTC-6 (Central (CST))
  - Summer (DST): UTC-5 (CDT)
- FIPS code: 27-20456
- GNIS feature ID: 0664139
- Website: https://falllaketownshipmn.gov/

Fall Lake Township is a township in Lake County, Minnesota, United States. The population was 630 at the 2020 census.

== Geography ==
According to the United States Census Bureau, the township has a total area of 587.3 square miles (1,521 km^{2}), of which 456.8 square miles (1,183 km^{2}) is land and 130.5 square miles (338.1 km^{2} or 22.23%) is water. It is the second-largest township in total area in Minnesota (to Angle Township in Lake of the Woods County). However, the Stony River Township and Forest Area Township have more land area than either (but much less water area).

== Demographics ==
As of the census of 2000, there were 584 people, 280 households, and 187 families residing in the township. The population density was 1.3 inhabitants per square mile (0.50/km^{2}). There were 783 housing units at an average density of 1.7 per square mile (0.66/km^{2}). The racial makeup of the township was 98.63% White, 0.51% Native American, 0.68% Asian, and 0.17% from two or more races. Hispanic or Latino of any race were 0.51% of the population.

There were 280 households, out of which 16.1% had children under the age of 18 living with them, 62.1% were married couples living together, 2.5% had a female householder with no husband present, and 33.2% were non-families. 28.9% of all households were made up of individuals, and 13.2% had someone living alone who was 65 years of age or older. The average household size was 2.09 and the average family size was 2.54.

In the township the population was spread out, with 13.4% under the age of 18, 5.8% from 18 to 24, 20.0% from 25 to 44, 40.4% from 45 to 64, and 20.4% who were 65 years of age or older. The median age was 50 years. For every 100 females, there were 110.8 males. For every 100 females age 18 and over, there were 112.6 males.

The median income for a household in the township was $48,036, and the median income for a family was $53,523. Males had a median income of $39,167 versus $31,932 for females. The per capita income for the township was $24,114. About 7.0% of families and 6.8% of the population were below the poverty line, including 6.8% of those under age 18 and 6.5% of those age 65 or over.
