= Finland State Forest =

State Forest in Lake and Cook counties, Minnesota

- Location within Minnesota
- Interactive map of Finland State Forest

Geography
- Location: Lake and Cook counties, Minnesota, United States
- Coordinates: 47°31′10″N 91°24′35″W
- Area: 311,970 acres (126,250 ha)

Administration
- Established: 1933
- Authority: Minnesota Department of Natural Resources, United States Forest Service, Lake/Cook Counties, Private
- Website: www.dnr.state.mn.us/state_forests/sft00017/index.html

Ecology
- WWF Classification: Western Great Lakes Forests
- EPA Classification: Northern Lakes and Forests
- Disturbance: Wildfire
- Fauna: Black bear, moose, white-tailed deer, ruffed grouse, gray wolf, fisher, bobcat

The Finland State Forest is a state forest located near the unincorporated community of Finland in Lake and Cook counties, Minnesota. Of the over 30,000 acres (12,000 ha), the Minnesota Department of Natural Resources manages a third of the land. The federal United States Forest Service manages roughly a quarter of the total forest acreage, as its boundary overlaps in part with that of Superior National Forest. The remainder is split between Cook and Lake County agencies, and private landowners.

Outdoor recreation opportunities in the forest include camping and hiking throughout the forest, canoeing, kayaking, and boating on the numerous lakes. Cold-water streams and lakes make trout fishing a popular activity. A large amount of the camping traffic is due to the forest's location 6 miles (9.7 km) from the popular Tettegouche State Park. Additionally, trails located throughout the forest accommodate a wide variety of activities. These include 25 miles (40 km) designated for mountain biking, 5.6 miles (9.0 km) for Class I All-terrain vehicle (ATV) use, 1 mile (1.6 km) for off-highway motorcycling, the 21 miles (34 km) Moose Walk Snowmobile Trail, as well as cross-country skiing.

== Climate ==
Isabella 14W is a weather station in Finland State Forest, located near Sand Lake and the Sand Lake Peatland Scientific and Natural Area.

Climate data for Isabella 14W, Minnesota, 1991–2020 normals, 2009–2020 snowfall: 1740ft (530m)
Month	Jan	Feb	Mar	Apr	May	Jun	Jul	Aug	Sep	Oct	Nov	Dec	Year
Record high °F (°C)	41 (5)	56 (13)	72 (22)	75 (24)	88 (31)	88 (31)	91 (33)	88 (31)	84 (29)	79 (26)	67 (19)	46 (8)	91 (33)
Mean daily maximum °F (°C)	16.1 (−8.8)	21.7 (−5.7)	34.3 (1.3)	47.8 (8.8)	62.7 (17.1)	71.4 (21.9)	76.2 (24.6)	74.8 (23.8)	65.0 (18.3)	50.2 (10.1)	34.0 (1.1)	21.9 (−5.6)	48.0 (8.9)
Daily mean °F (°C)	5.5 (−14.7)	9.2 (−12.7)	22.7 (−5.2)	36.5 (2.5)	50.6 (10.3)	59.9 (15.5)	64.5 (18.1)	62.8 (17.1)	54.2 (12.3)	41.0 (5.0)	26.4 (−3.1)	13.0 (−10.6)	37.2 (2.9)
Mean daily minimum °F (°C)	−5.2 (−20.7)	−3.3 (−19.6)	11.0 (−11.7)	25.1 (−3.8)	38.5 (3.6)	48.4 (9.1)	52.8 (11.6)	50.7 (10.4)	43.4 (6.3)	31.8 (−0.1)	18.7 (−7.4)	4.1 (−15.5)	26.3 (−3.1)
Record low °F (°C)	−42 (−41)	−40 (−40)	−35 (−37)	−10 (−23)	17 (−8)	27 (−3)	28 (−2)	25 (−4)	18 (−8)	12 (−11)	−21 (−29)	−42 (−41)	−42 (−41)
Average precipitation inches (mm)	0.94 (24)	0.87 (22)	1.54 (39)	2.08 (53)	3.17 (81)	4.26 (108)	4.06 (103)	3.27 (83)	3.54 (90)	3.10 (79)	1.91 (49)	1.21 (31)	29.95 (762)
Average snowfall inches (cm)	17.8 (45)	20.0 (51)	13.8 (35)	13.1 (33)	1.6 (4.1)	0.0 (0.0)	0.0 (0.0)	0.0 (0.0)	0.0 (0.0)	4.9 (12)	14.5 (37)	22.6 (57)	108.3 (274.1)
Source 1: NOAA
Source 2: XMACIS (snowfall & records)

== See also ==
- List of Minnesota state forests
- Tettegouche State Park
