= Beaver Bay, Minnesota =

City in Minnesota, United States

- City
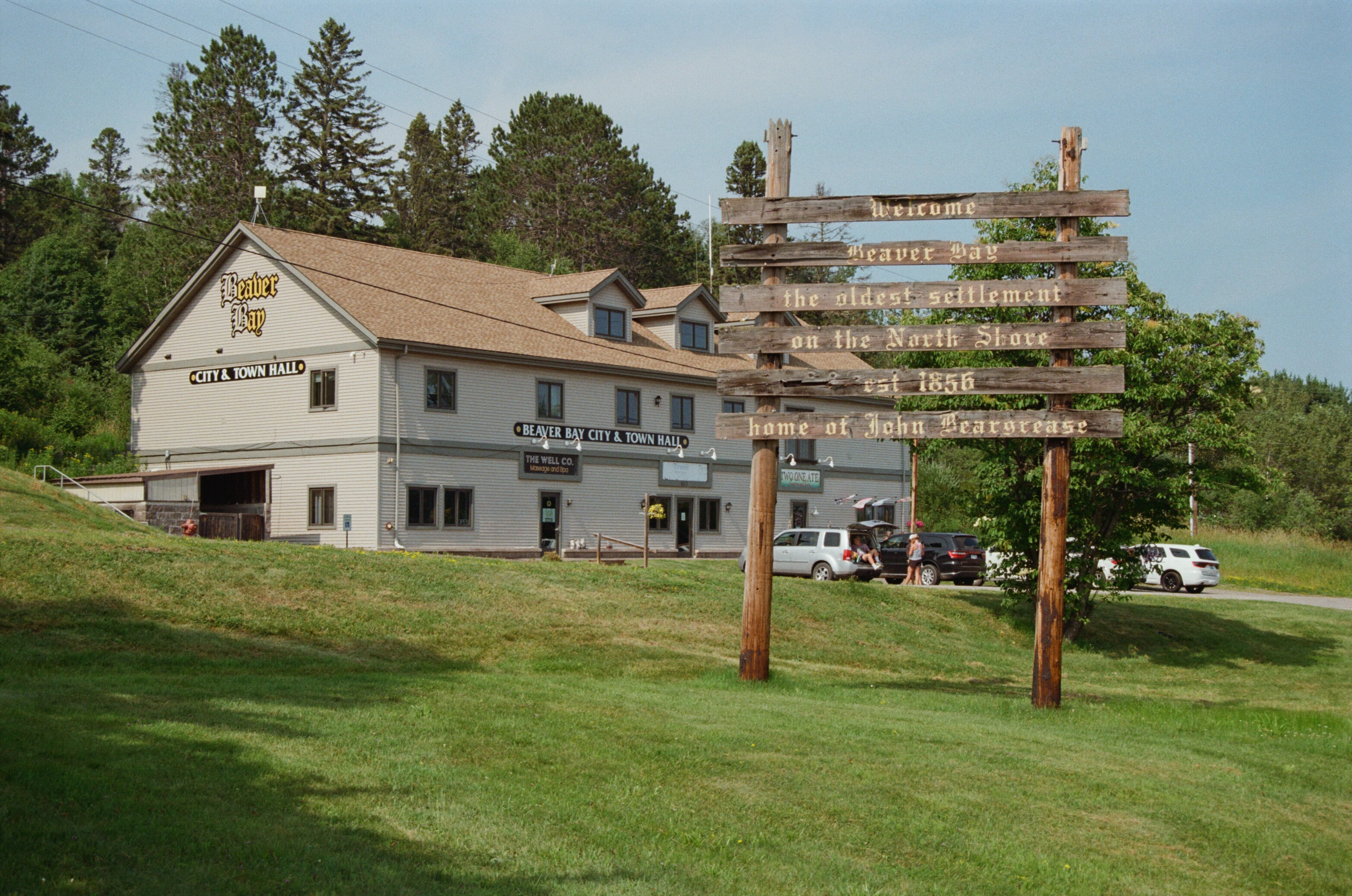
- Beaver Bay City/Town Hall and Welcome Sign

- Location of the city of Beaver Bay within Lake County, Minnesota
- Coordinates: 47°15′29″N 91°18′4″W
- Country: United States
- State: Minnesota
- County: Lake
- Incorporated: August 13, 1953

Government
  - Mayor: Nancy L. Krull

Area
  - Total: 0.799 sq mi (2.069 km^{2})
  - Land: 0.799 sq mi (2.069 km^{2})
  - Water: 0 sq mi (0.000 km^{2})
- Elevation: 702 ft (214 m)

Population (2020)
  - Total: 120
  - Estimate (2022): 120
  - Density: 150/sq mi (58/km^{2})
- Time zone: UTC−6 (Central (CST))
  - Summer (DST): UTC−5 (CDT)
- ZIP Code: 55601
- Area code: 218
- FIPS code: 27-04456
- GNIS feature ID: 0655294
- Sales tax: 7.375%
- Website: beaverbaymn.com

Beaver Bay is a city in Lake County, Minnesota, United States. The population was 120 at the 2020 census.

Minnesota Highway 61 serves as a main route in the community.

== History ==
Beaver Bay is the oldest settlement on the North Shore of Lake Superior. It was established in 1856.

The community is also the home of the annual John Beargrease Dog Sled Race.

== Geography ==
According to the United States Census Bureau, the city has a total area of 0.799 square miles (2.07 km^{2}), of which 0.799 square miles (2.07 km^{2}) is land and 0.000 square miles (0.00 km^{2}) is water.

The Beaver River flows through the community. The river flows into Lake Superior.

Beaver Bay is located 3 miles southwest of Silver Bay, 24 miles northeast of Two Harbors, and 51 miles northeast of Duluth.

It is along Minnesota Highway 61. Other routes include Lake County Road 4, Lax Lake Road.

Split Rock Lighthouse State Park is 5 miles southwest of Beaver Bay.

== Demographics ==
Historical population
Census	Pop.	Note	%±
1960	287		—
1970	362		26.1%
1980	283		−21.8%
1990	147		−48.1%
2000	175		19.0%
2010	181		3.4%
2020	120		−33.7%
2022 (est.)	120		0.0%
U.S. Decennial Census; 2020 Census

=== 2010 census ===
As of the 2010 census, there were 181 people, 84 households, and 48 families living in the city. The population density was 247.9 inhabitants per square mile (95.7/km^{2}). There were 187 housing units at an average density of 256.2 per square mile (98.9/km^{2}). The racial makeup of the city was 91.7% White, 1.1% African American, 1.7% Native American, and 5.5% from two or more races.

There were 84 households, of which 22.6% had children under the age of 18 living with them, 36.9% were married couples living together, 13.1% had a female householder with no husband present, 7.1% had a male householder with no wife present, and 42.9% were non-families. 38.1% of all households were made up of individuals, and 8.3% had someone living alone who was 65 years of age or older. The average household size was 2.15 and the average family size was 2.73.

The median age in the city was 45.8 years. 23.8% of residents were under the age of 18; 8.8% were between the ages of 18 and 24; 16.6% were from 25 to 44; 32% were from 45 to 64; and 18.8% were 65 years of age or older. The gender makeup of the city was 65.7% male and 34.3% female.

=== 2000 census ===
As of the 2000 census, there were 175 people, 93 households, and 50 families living in the city. The population density was 360.5 inhabitants per square mile (139.2/km^{2}). There were 139 housing units at an average density of 286.3 per square mile (110.5/km^{2}). The racial makeup of the city was 92.57% White, 2.86% African American, 2.29% Native American, 0.57% Asian, and 1.71% from two or more races. Hispanic or Latino of any race were 0.57% of the population. 38.3% were of Norwegian, 11.7% German, 9.2% American, 9.2% Swedish, 5.8% Finnish, 5.0% English, and 5.0% Irish ancestry.

There were 93 households, out of which 14.0% had children under the age of 18 living with them, 40.9% were married couples living together, 8.6% had a female householder with no husband present, and 46.2% were non-families. Individuals comprised 40.9% of all households, and 10.8% had someone living alone who was 65 years of age or older. The average household size was 1.88 and the average family size was 2.48.

In the city, the population was spread out, with 15.4% under the age of 18, 10.9% from 18 to 24, 23.4% from 25 to 44, 28.6% from 45 to 64, and 21.7% who were 65 years of age or older. The median age was 46 years. For every 100 females, there were 121.5 males. For every 100 females age 18 and over, there were 120.9 males.

The median income for a household in the city was $30,000, and the median income for a family was $47,500. Males had a median income of $30,893 versus $17,500 for females. The per capita income for the city was $18,415. About 15.9% of families and 21.2% of the population were below the poverty line, including 44.0% of those under the age of eighteen and 7.4% of those sixty-five or over.

== Gallery ==
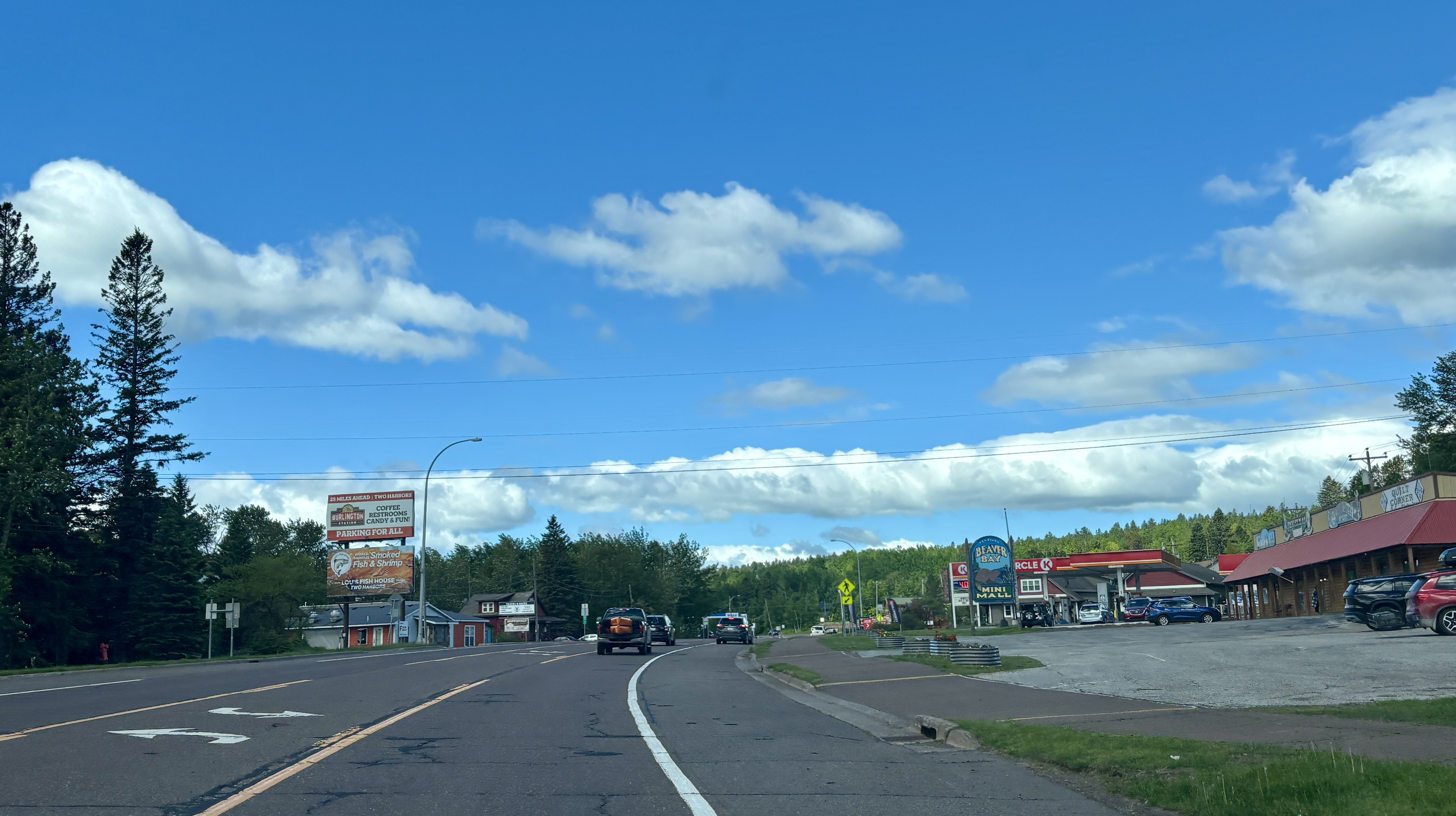
Entering city going south on Hwy 61

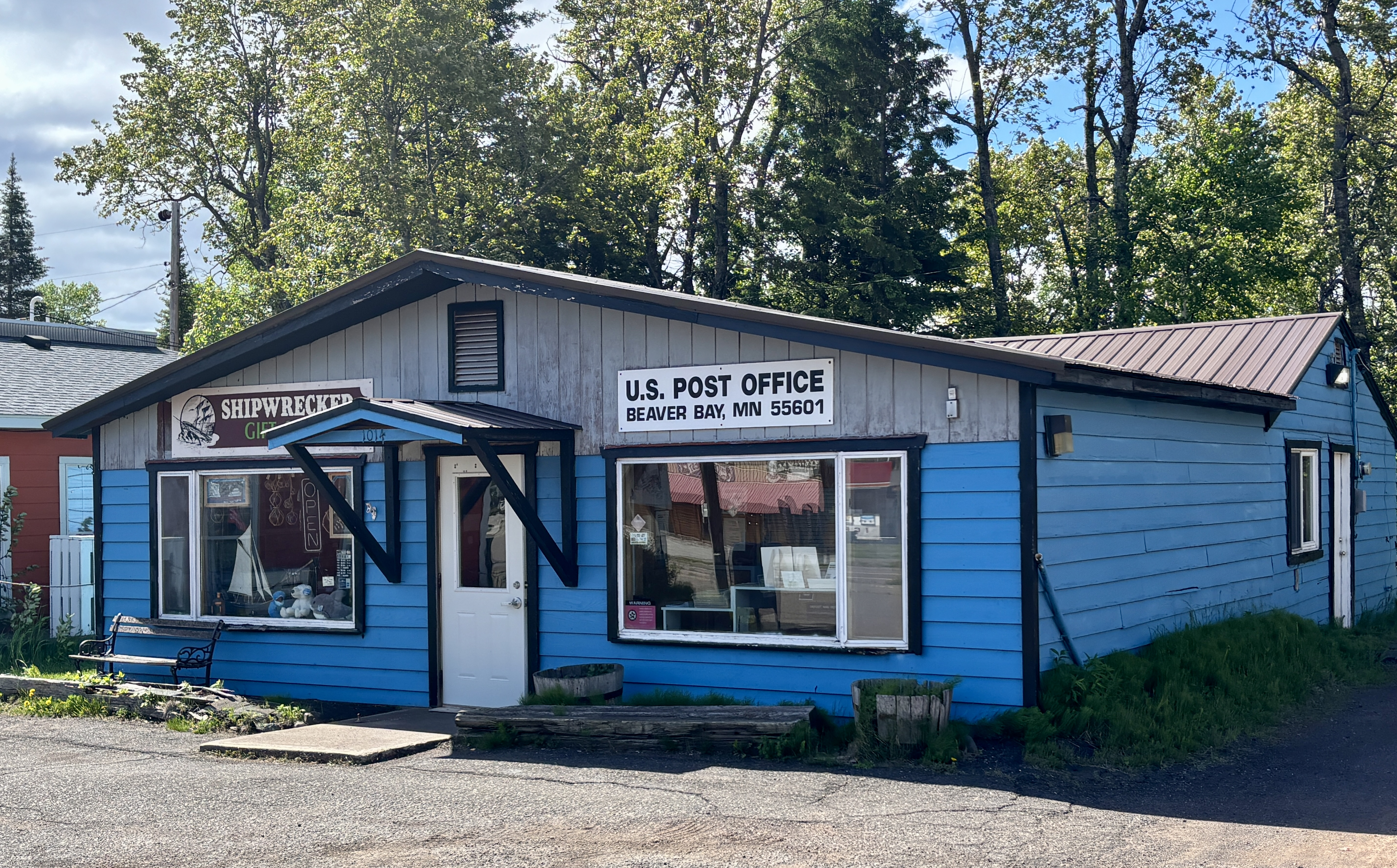
United States Post Office

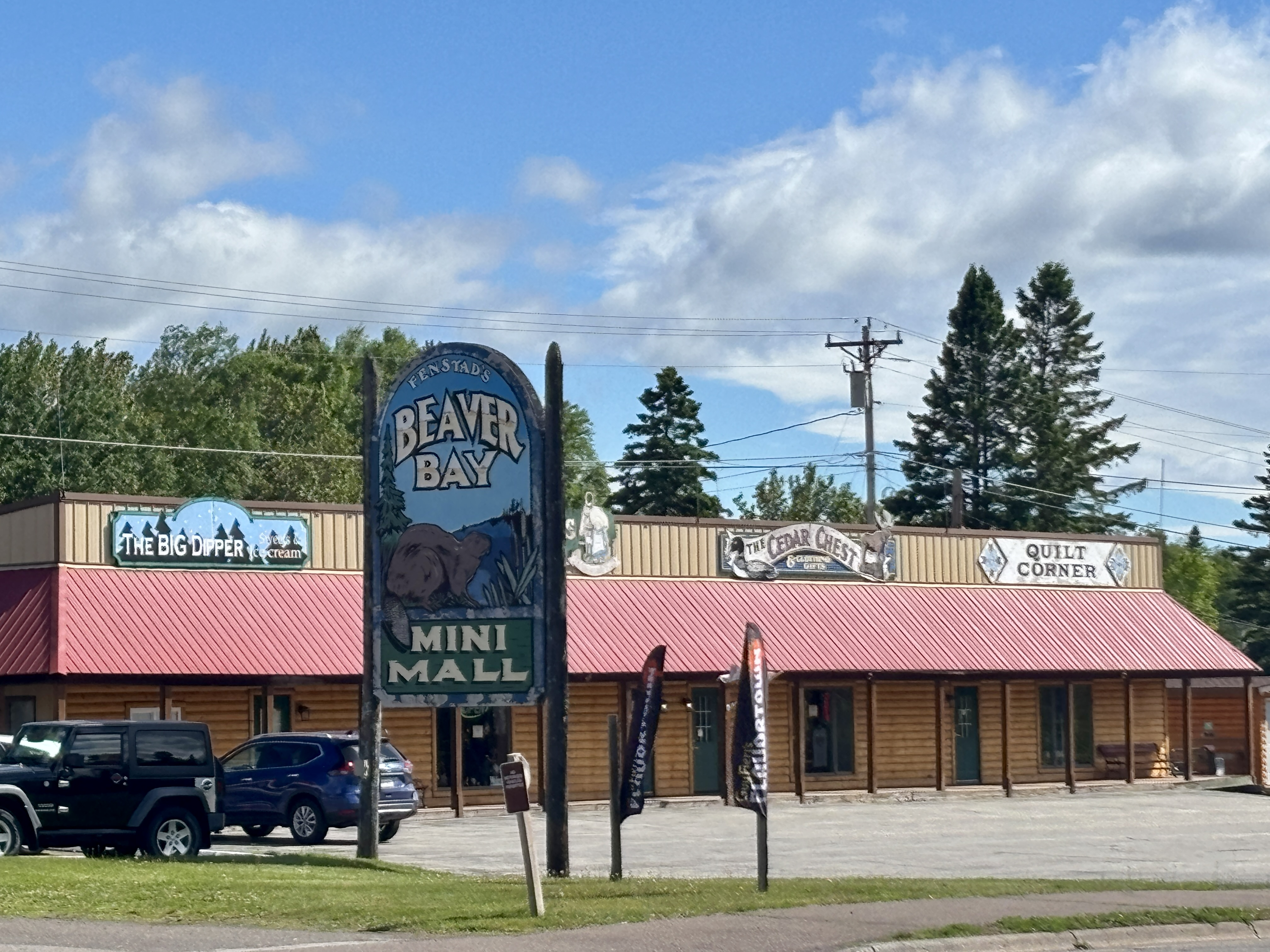
Commercial strip mall

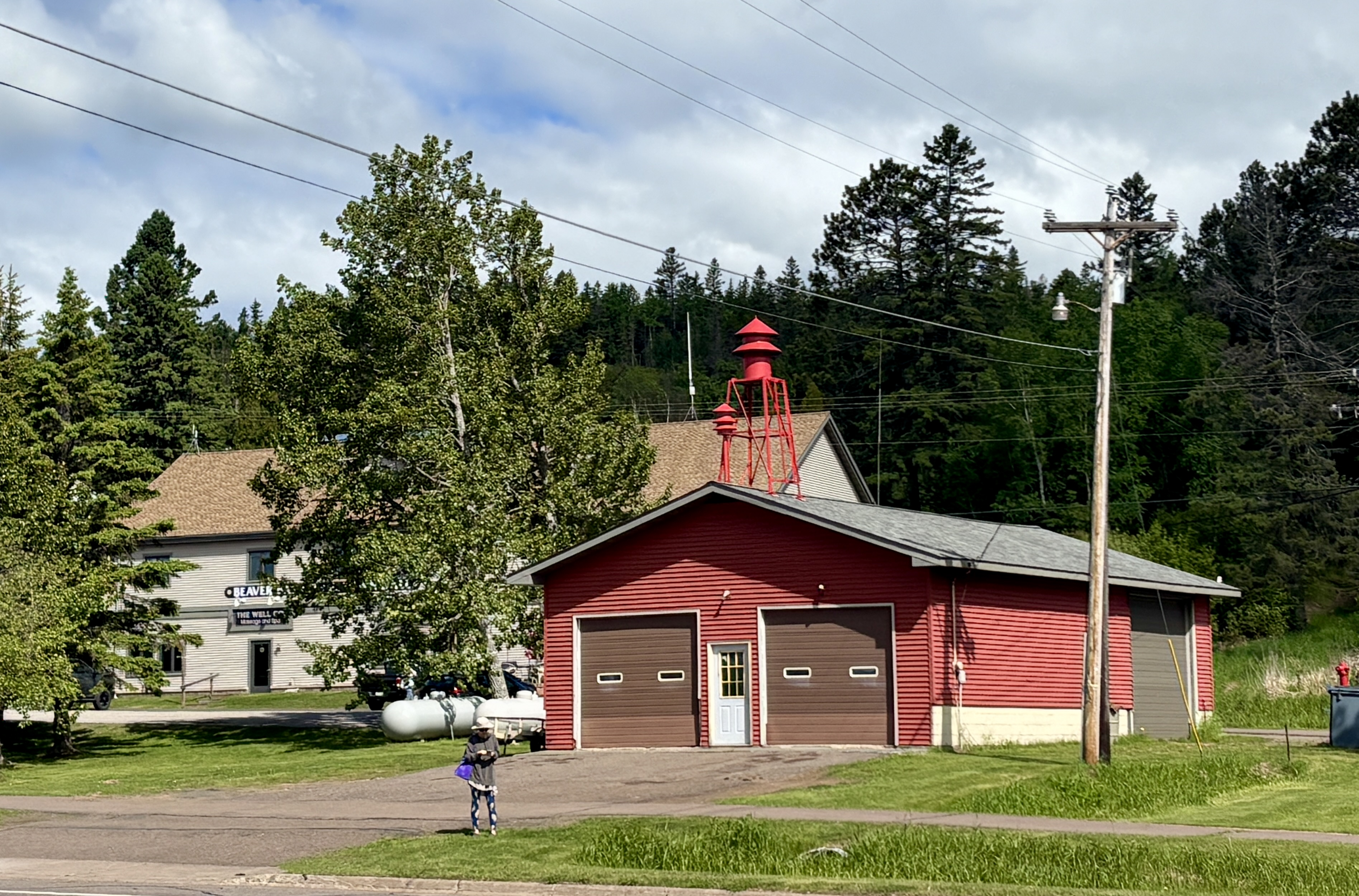
Fire station
