= Silver Creek Township, Lake County, Minnesota =

Silver Creek Township, Minnesota
- Township
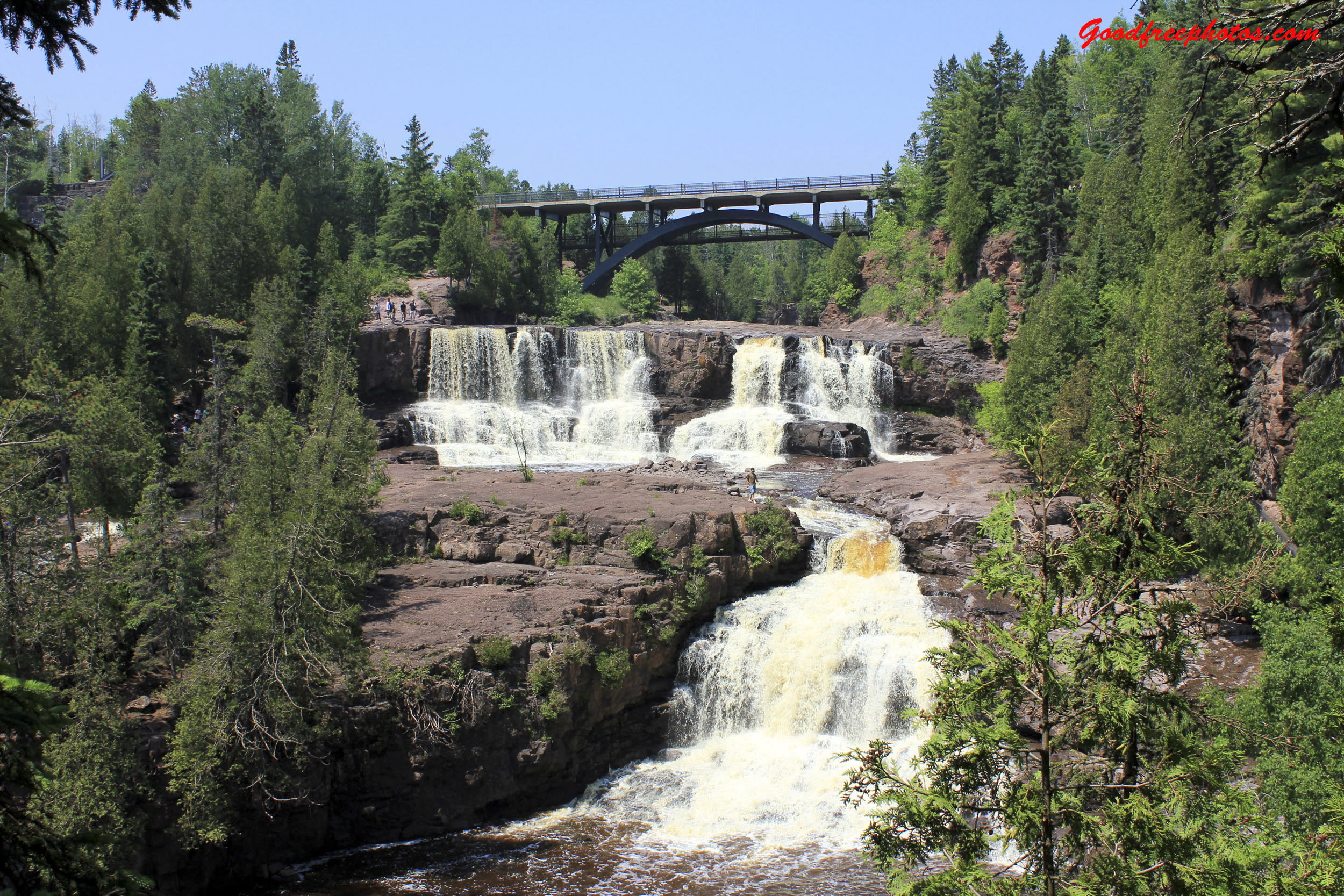
- Gooseberry Falls

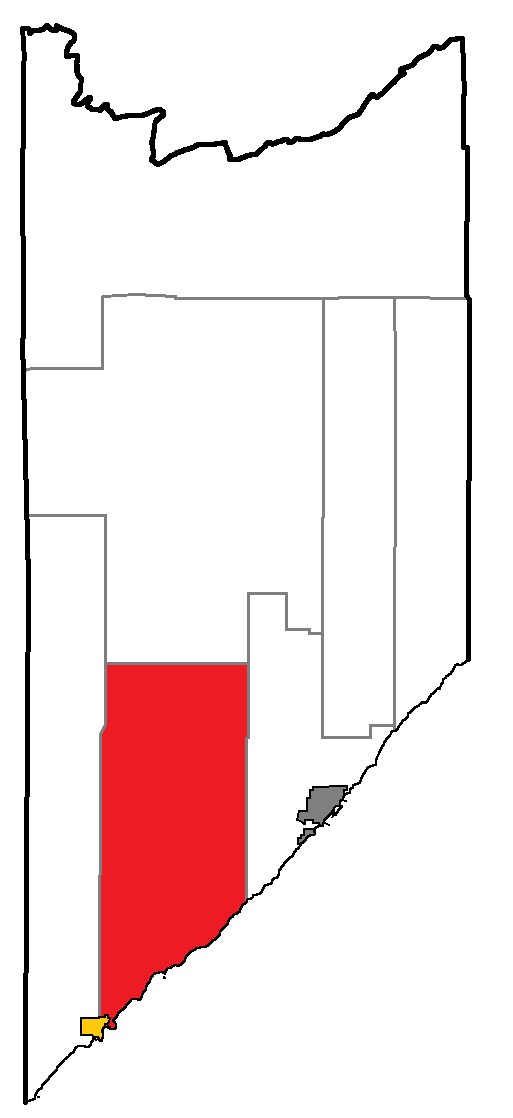
- Location of Silver Creek Township within Lake County, Minnesota
- Coordinates: 47°15′48″N 91°34′26″W
- Country: United States
- State: Minnesota
- County: Lake

Area
  - Total: 296.6 sq mi (768.3 km^{2})
  - Land: 294.8 sq mi (763.6 km^{2})
  - Water: 1.8 sq mi (4.7 km^{2})
- Elevation: 1,512 ft (461 m)

Population (2020)
  - Total: 1,192
  - Density: 4.043/sq mi (1.561/km^{2})
- Time zone: UTC-6 (Central (CST))
  - Summer (DST): UTC-5 (CDT)
- FIPS code: 27-60304
- GNIS feature ID: 0665613
- Website: https://www.silvercreekmnlakeco.gov/

Silver Creek Township is a township in Lake County, Minnesota, United States. The population was 1,192 at the 2020 census.

Minnesota State Highway 61 serves as a main route in the township.

Silver Creek Township was organized in 1905.

== Geography ==
According to the United States Census Bureau, the township has a total area of 296.6 square miles (768.3 km^{2}), of which 294.8 square miles (763.6 km^{2}) of it is land and 1.8 square miles (4.7 km^{2}) of it (0.61%) is water.

== Demographics ==
As of the census of 2000, there were 1,178 people, 488 households, and 368 families residing in the township. The population density was 4.0 people per square mile (1.5/km^{2}). There were 984 housing units at an average density of 3.3/sq mi (1.3/km^{2}). The racial makeup of the township was 97.88% White, 0.25% Native American, 0.17% Asian, 0.17% from other races, and 1.53% from two or more races. Hispanic or Latino of any race were 0.25% of the population.

There were 488 households, out of which 26.4% had children under the age of 18 living with them, 66.8% were married couples living together, 3.5% had a female householder with no husband present, and 24.4% were non-families. 21.5% of all households were made up of individuals, and 8.6% had someone living alone who was 65 years of age or older. The average household size was 2.41 and the average family size was 2.80.

In the township the population was spread out, with 21.4% under the age of 18, 5.9% from 18 to 24, 24.4% from 25 to 44, 32.4% from 45 to 64, and 15.9% who were 65 years of age or older. The median age was 44 years. For every 100 females, there were 107.0 males. For every 100 females age 18 and over, there were 106.2 males.

The median income for a household in the township was $45,662, and the median income for a family was $49,808. Males had a median income of $35,313 versus $22,500 for females. The per capita income for the township was $20,522. About 1.7% of families and 3.0% of the population were below the poverty line, including none of those under age 18 and 7.4% of those age 65 or over.
