= Lake County, Minnesota =

County in Minnesota, United States

- County
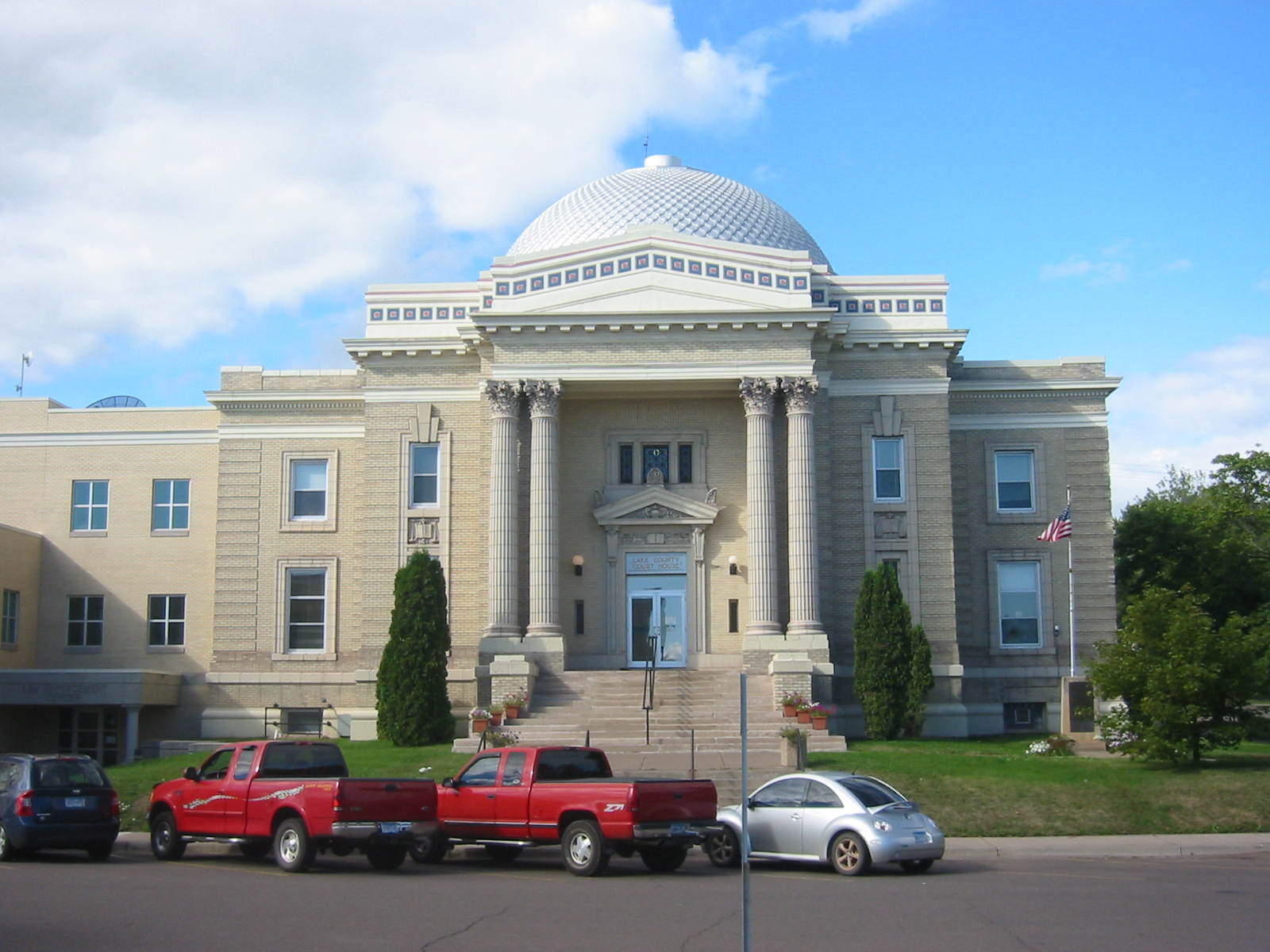
- Lake County Courthouse

- Location within the U.S. state of Minnesota
- Coordinates: 47°32′N 91°23′W
- Country: United States
- State: Minnesota
- Founded: March 1, 1856
- Named for: Lake Superior
- Seat: Two Harbors
- Largest city: Two Harbors

Area
  - Total: 2,991 sq mi (7,750 km^{2})
  - Land: 2,109 sq mi (5,460 km^{2})
  - Water: 881 sq mi (2,280 km^{2}) 29%

Population (2020)
  - Total: 10,905
  - Estimate (2025): 10,746 ▼
  - Density: 5.171/sq mi (1.996/km^{2})
- Time zone: UTC−6 (Central)
  - Summer (DST): UTC−5 (CDT)
- Congressional district: 8th
- Website: www.co.lake.mn.us

Lake County is a county in the U.S. state of Minnesota. As of the 2020 census, the population was 10,905. Its county seat is Two Harbors.

== History ==
Prior to the arrival of Europeans, the area had long been inhabited by Native American groups. At the time of European contact, the principal Native American groups in the region were the Dakota (Sioux) and Ojibwe (also called Anishinabe or Chippewa). The economy of these groups was based on hunting, fishing and gathering, with wild rice being of particular importance. The first Europeans to explore the area were the French in the late 17th century who were followed by trappers, fur traders, missionaries, and explorers.

The Wisconsin Territory was established by the Federal Government effective July 3, 1836, and existed until its eastern portion was granted statehood (as Wisconsin) in 1848. Therefore, the Federal Government set up the Minnesota Territory effective March 3, 1849. The newly organized territorial legislature created nine counties across the territory in October of that year. One of those original counties, Itasca, had its eastern section partitioned off on February 20, 1855, into two new counties: the western part was designated Newton and the eastern part was named Superior County. The territorial legislature returned to the matter on March 3, changing Superior County to Saint Louis County. Then on March 1, 1856, the county name was again changed, to Lake County, and the "Saint Louis County" name was given to the previous Newton County. With the new name came the designation of county seat at Beaver Bay, which had first been platted in 1856. The county's boundaries were altered in 1874, when its eastern part was partitioned off to create Cook County.

In 1868, iron ore was discovered on the Vermilion Range by George Stuntz. A spur of the Duluth and Iron Range Railroad was extended to the Lake Superior shore, and a settlement quickly sprang up at the terminus. This settlement was incorporated as a village (Two Harbors) on March 9, 1888, and that same year a vote was taken to transfer the county seat from Beaver Bay to Two Harbors (1888).

Commercial fishing on Lake Superior became important during the late 1880s, spurred by the arrival of Swedish and Norwegian immigrants to the North Shore. In 1890, the Merritt brothers discovered the Mesabi Range. The Two Harbors Lighthouse was built on Agate Bay in 1892. Ten years later, five Two Harbors businessmen signed the articles of incorporation for a new mining company named 3M. Today, 3M Corporation has over 70,000 employees worldwide and produces more than 50,000 adhesive household products, and is now headquartered in Maplewood, Minnesota.

In 1906, the Court House, which stands to this day, was built. In 1907, one of the nation's first steel ore docks was built in Two Harbors. In 1944, one of the first HMOs in the United States was created in Lake County to serve railroad employees. A second iron ore boom took place in the 1950s with the development of the taconite beneficiation process for turning lean, low-grade iron ore into a shippable product.

In 2021, the Greenwood Fire burned over 10,500 acres of the county southwest of Isabella, beginning near Greenwood Lake.

== Geography ==
Lake County lies on the north side of Minnesota. Its north border abuts the south border of the province of Ontario, Canada, and its south border is formed by Lake Superior. However, the Canadian border is inaccessible from Lake County due to the heavily wooded terrain of the Superior National Forest and rugged terrain in the northern part of the county. Its terrain consists of rolling mountains and hills, heavily wooded, and dotted with lakes and ponds; which makes any border crossing to Canada from the county impossible, but the Canadian border can be accessed through Grand Portage, International Falls or Baudette. The terrain slopes both ways from a crestline that runs from its northeast line to its southwest line; the county's highest point is Stony Tower Hill at 2,301' ASL. The county has a total area of 2,991 square miles (7,750 km^{2}), of which 2,109 square miles (5,460 km^{2}) is land and 881 square miles (2,280 km^{2}) (29%) is water. It is the fifth-largest county in Minnesota by area.

Lake County is located in the Arrowhead Region of Northeastern Minnesota.

=== Major highways ===
- Minnesota State Highway 1
- Minnesota State Highway 61
- Minnesota State Highway 169
- List of county roads

=== Adjacent counties ===
- Rainy River District, Ontario - north
- Cook County - east
- St. Louis County - west
- Ashland County, Wisconsin - southeast (across Lake Superior)
- Bayfield County, Wisconsin - south (across Lake Superior)
- Douglas County, Wisconsin - south (across Lake Superior)
- Saint Louis County - west

=== Protected areas ===
- Finland State Forest
- George H. Crosby Manitou State Park
- Gooseberry Falls State Park
- Sand Lake Peatland Scientific and Natural Area
- Split Rock Lighthouse State Park
- Superior National Forest (part)
  - Boundary Waters Canoe Area Wilderness (part)
- Tettegouche State Park

== Demographics ==
Historical population
Census	Pop.	Note	%±
1860	248		—
1870	135		−45.6%
1880	106		−21.5%
1890	1,299		1,125.5%
1900	4,654		258.3%
1910	8,011		72.1%
1920	8,251		3.0%
1930	7,068		−14.3%
1940	6,956		−1.6%
1950	7,781		11.9%
1960	13,702		76.1%
1970	13,351		−2.6%
1980	13,043		−2.3%
1990	10,415		−20.1%
2000	11,058		6.2%
2010	10,866		−1.7%
2020	10,905		0.4%
2025 (est.)	10,746	▼	−1.5%
U.S. Decennial Census; 1790-1960 1900-1990; 1990-2000

=== Racial and ethnic composition ===
Lake County, Minnesota – Racial and ethnic composition Note: the US Census treats Hispanic/Latino as an ethnic category. This table excludes Latinos from the racial categories and assigns them to a separate category. Hispanics/Latinos may be of any race.
Race / Ethnicity (NH = Non-Hispanic)	Pop 1980	Pop 1990	Pop 2000	Pop 2010	Pop 2020	% 1980	% 1990	% 2000	% 2010	% 2020
White alone (NH)	12,882	10,305	10,803	10,558	10,281	98.77%	98.94%	97.69%	97.17%	94.28%
Black or African American alone (NH)	19	1	11	16	11	0.15%	0.01%	0.10%	0.15%	0.10%
Native American or Alaska Native alone (NH)	44	61	75	50	50	0.34%	0.59%	0.68%	0.46%	0.46%
Asian alone (NH)	39	16	18	31	55	0.30%	0.15%	0.16%	0.29%	0.50%
Native Hawaiian or Pacific Islander alone (NH)	x	x	1	0	0	x	x	0.01%	0.00%	0.00%
Other race alone (NH)	10	0	3	2	30	0.08%	0.00%	0.03%	0.02%	0.28%
Mixed race or Multiracial (NH)	x	x	84	129	365	x	x	0.76%	1.19%	3.35%
Hispanic or Latino (any race)	49	32	63	80	113	0.38%	0.31%	0.57%	0.74%	1.04%
Total	13,043	10,415	11,058	10,866	10,905	100.00%	100.00%	100.00%	100.00%	100.00%

=== 2020 census ===
As of the 2020 census, the county had a population of 10,905. The median age was 50.6 years. 18.9% of residents were under the age of 18 and 27.9% of residents were 65 years of age or older. For every 100 females there were 104.8 males, and for every 100 females age 18 and over there were 102.8 males age 18 and over.

The racial makeup of the county was 94.7% White, 0.1% Black or African American, 0.5% American Indian and Alaska Native, 0.5% Asian, <0.1% Native Hawaiian and Pacific Islander, 0.4% from some other race, and 3.8% from two or more races. Hispanic or Latino residents of any race comprised 1.0% of the population.

<0.1% of residents lived in urban areas, while 100.0% lived in rural areas.

There were 4,869 households in the county, of which 23.0% had children under the age of 18 living in them. Of all households, 51.4% were married-couple households, 21.0% were households with a male householder and no spouse or partner present, and 21.3% were households with a female householder and no spouse or partner present. About 32.1% of all households were made up of individuals and 16.7% had someone living alone who was 65 years of age or older.

There were 7,311 housing units, of which 33.4% were vacant. Among occupied housing units, 82.5% were owner-occupied and 17.5% were renter-occupied. The homeowner vacancy rate was 1.4% and the rental vacancy rate was 9.1%.

=== 2000 census ===
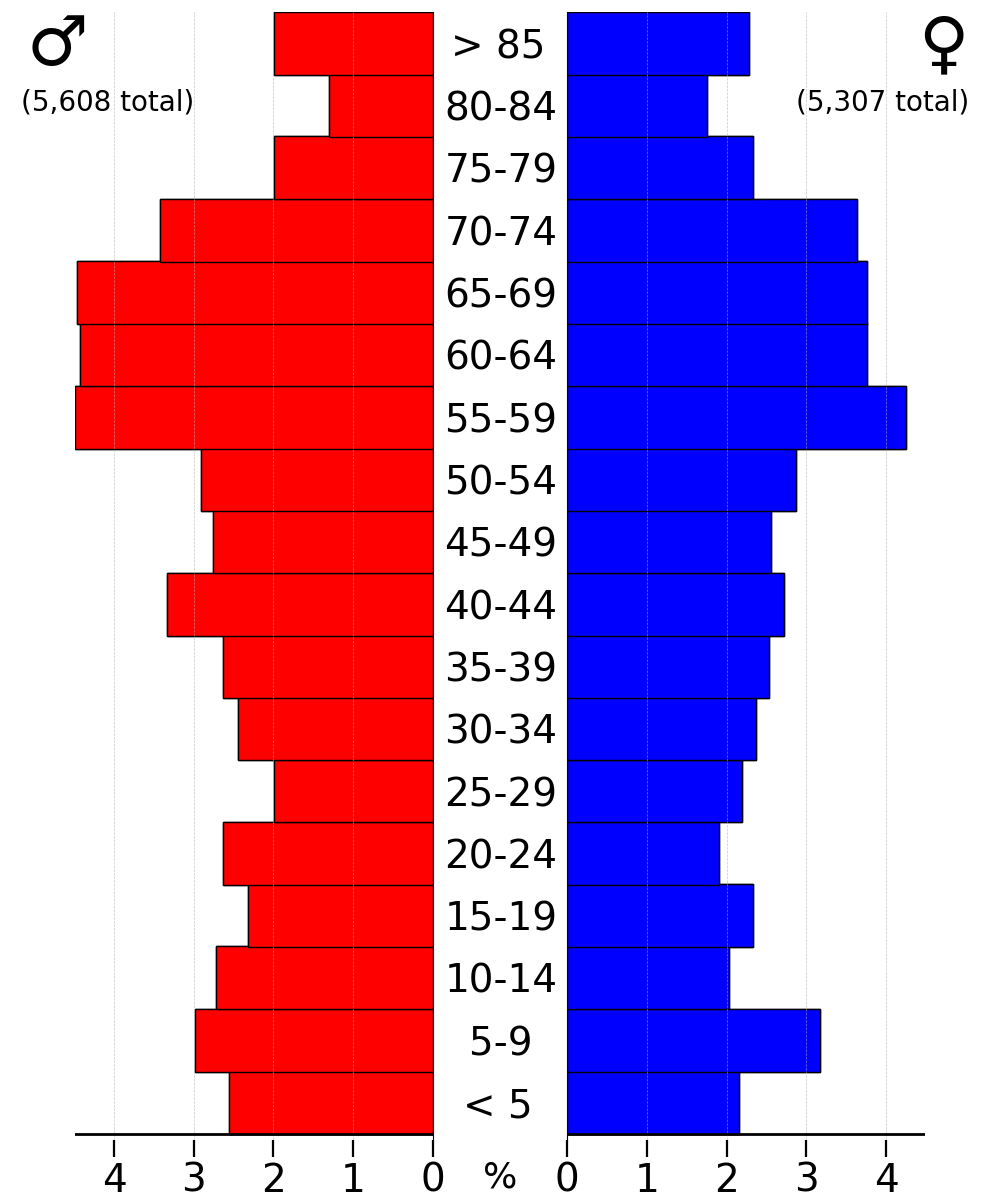
2022 US Census population pyramid for Lake County, from ACS 5-year estimates

As of the census of 2000, there were 11,058 people, 4,646 households, and 3,140 families in the county. The population density was 5.24 per square mile (2.02/km^{2}). There were 6,840 housing units at an average density of 3.24 per square mile (1.25/km^{2}). The racial makeup of the county was 97.99% White, 0.10% Black or African American, 0.70% Native American, 0.18% Asian, 0.01% Pacific Islander, 0.14% from other races, and 0.88% from two or more races. 0.57% of the population were Hispanic or Latino of any race. 22.3% were of Norwegian, 17.8% German, 14.3% Swedish, 8.4% Finnish, 6.3% Irish and 5.4% English ancestry.

There were 4,646 households, out of which 27.10% had children under the age of 18 living with them, 57.80% were married couples living together, 6.60% had a female householder with no husband present, and 32.40% were non-families. 28.00% of all households were made up of individuals, and 12.70% had someone living alone who was 65 years of age or older. The average household size was 2.32 and the average family size was 2.83.

The county population contained 22.30% under the age of 18, 6.60% from 18 to 24, 24.50% from 25 to 44, 26.70% from 45 to 64, and 20.00% who were 65 years of age or older. The median age was 43 years. For every 100 females there were 99.70 males. For every 100 females age 18 and over, there were 99.60 males.

The median income for a household in the county was $40,402, and the median income for a family was $46,980. Males had a median income of $39,719 versus $26,500 for females. The per capita income for the county was $19,761. About 5.50% of families and 7.40% of the population were below the poverty line, including 9.40% of those under age 18 and 5.70% of those age 65 or over.

== Government and politics ==
Lake County has a historic Democratic/Labor lean. It was the top county for Socialist Party of America candidate Eugene V. Debs in 1908, 1912, and 1920. The last Republican to carry the county was Herbert Hoover in his failed run for re-election in 1932 against Franklin D. Roosevelt, although in the 1932 election Socialist Norman Thomas received 19.32% of the county's vote, one of the highest percentages in the country. Ironically, Lake County was the only county in Minnesota to vote for Hoover in 1932, despite going on to give Roosevelt his largest percentage in the state in 1936 and continuing to vote staunchly Democratic through 2012. However, in recent elections, the county has become more competitive. In 2016, while Lake County was the whitest county in the entire country to vote for Democrat Hillary Clinton over Republican Donald Trump, Clinton became the first and only Democrat to fail to obtain a majority of the county’s vote since 1932. Furthermore, Trump got the highest percentage of the vote of any Republican since 1928, and went on to further increase his vote share in 2020 and held Joe Biden to under 51% of the county's vote. Trump came within 145 votes of winning Lake County in 2016, was within 254 votes of winning it in 2020, and within 269 votes in 2024, becoming the only Republican since 1932 to even come within 1,000 votes of winning the county.

United States presidential election results for Lake County, Minnesota
Year	Republican		Democratic		Third party(ies)	
Year	No.	%	No.	%	No.	%
1892	290	60.04%	126	26.09%	67	13.87%
1896	595	64.05%	320	34.45%	14	1.51%
1900	639	66.98%	278	29.14%	37	3.88%
1904	603	67.45%	77	8.61%	214	23.94%
1908	584	51.23%	152	13.33%	404	35.44%
1912	182	14.38%	195	15.40%	889	70.22%
1916	401	30.22%	506	38.13%	420	31.65%
1920	990	40.93%	594	24.56%	835	34.52%
1924	1,251	46.63%	60	2.24%	1,372	51.14%
1928	2,014	72.84%	618	22.35%	133	4.81%
1932	1,290	42.97%	1,059	35.28%	653	21.75%
1936	617	18.20%	2,717	80.15%	56	1.65%
1940	933	24.99%	2,750	73.67%	50	1.34%
1944	792	24.45%	2,401	74.13%	46	1.42%
1948	924	24.78%	2,555	68.52%	250	6.70%
1952	1,451	33.83%	2,814	65.61%	24	0.56%
1956	2,055	39.96%	3,079	59.87%	9	0.17%
1960	2,276	36.83%	3,888	62.91%	16	0.26%
1964	1,205	20.34%	4,704	79.39%	16	0.27%
1968	1,351	22.93%	4,266	72.42%	274	4.65%
1972	2,575	40.70%	3,640	57.53%	112	1.77%
1976	2,313	35.05%	3,973	60.21%	313	4.74%
1980	2,414	34.83%	3,864	55.75%	653	9.42%
1984	2,003	30.68%	4,468	68.43%	58	0.89%
1988	1,838	31.83%	3,887	67.31%	50	0.87%
1992	1,465	23.05%	3,415	53.72%	1,477	23.23%
1996	1,684	27.93%	3,388	56.20%	957	15.87%
2000	2,465	37.56%	3,579	54.53%	519	7.91%
2004	2,769	39.16%	4,212	59.57%	90	1.27%
2008	2,636	37.82%	4,174	59.89%	159	2.28%
2012	2,610	38.27%	4,043	59.28%	167	2.45%
2016	2,932	44.96%	3,077	47.19%	512	7.85%
2020	3,393	47.11%	3,647	50.64%	162	2.25%
2024	3,265	46.95%	3,534	50.82%	155	2.23%

County Board of Commissioners
Position	Name	District	Term Ending
Commissioner	Pete Walsh	District 1	2026
Commissioner	Derrick (Rick) Goutermont	District 2	2024
Commissioner	Richard (Rick) Hogenson	District 3	2024
Commissioner and Vice Chair	Jeremy Hurd	District 4	2026
Commissioner and Chairperson	Rich Sve	District 5	2024

State Legislature (2023-2025)
Position	Name	Affiliation	District
Senate	Grant Hauschild	Democrat	District 3
House of Representatives	Roger Skraba	Republican	District 3A
House of Representatives	Natalie Zelezinkar	Republican	District 3B

U.S Congress (2023-2025)
Position	Name	Affiliation	District
House of Representatives	Pete Stauber	Republican	8th
Senate	Amy Klobuchar	Democrat	N/A
Senate	Tina Smith	Democrat	N/A

== Communities ==
=== Cities ===
- Beaver Bay
- Silver Bay
- Two Harbors (county seat)

=== Census-designated places ===
- Finland
- Knife River

=== Unincorporated communities ===
- Alger
- Castle Danger
- Cramer
- East Beaver Bay
- Highland (Marcy)
- Illgen City
- Isabella
- Larsmont
- Lax Lake
- Little Marais
- McNair
- Murphy City
- Sawbill Landing
- Section Thirty
- Silver Creek
- Stewart
- Toimi
- Waldo
- Wales

=== Ghost towns ===
- Avon
- Avoy
- Beaver
- Britton
- Buell
- Case
- Clark
- Crystal
- Darby Junction
- Drummond
- Eclfo
- Emetta
- Fernburg Tower
- Forest Center
- Freedom
- Green
- Greenwood Junction
- Howlett
- Jordan
- Kent
- London
- Malmota (Marmata)
- Maple
- Marble Lake
- Moose
- Morris
- Murfin
- Nigadoo
- Norshore Junction
- North Branch
- Riblet
- Scott Junction
- Silver
- Splitrock
- Stafford
- Summit
- Swift
- Thomas
- Wanless
- Westover
- Whyte
- Wolf
- York

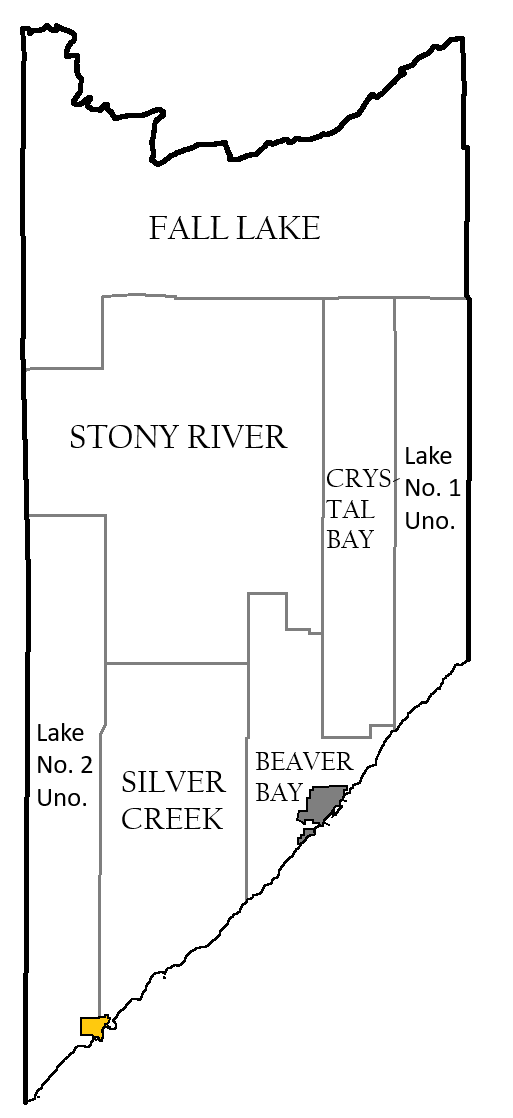
Townships and Unorganized Territories of Lake County

=== Townships ===
- Beaver Bay Township
- Crystal Bay Township
- Fall Lake Township
- Silver Creek Township
- Stony River Township

=== Unorganized territories ===
- Lake No. 1
- Lake No. 2

== See also ==
- National Register of Historic Places listings in Lake County, Minnesota
