= Stony River Township, Lake County, Minnesota =

Stony River Township, Minnesota
- Township
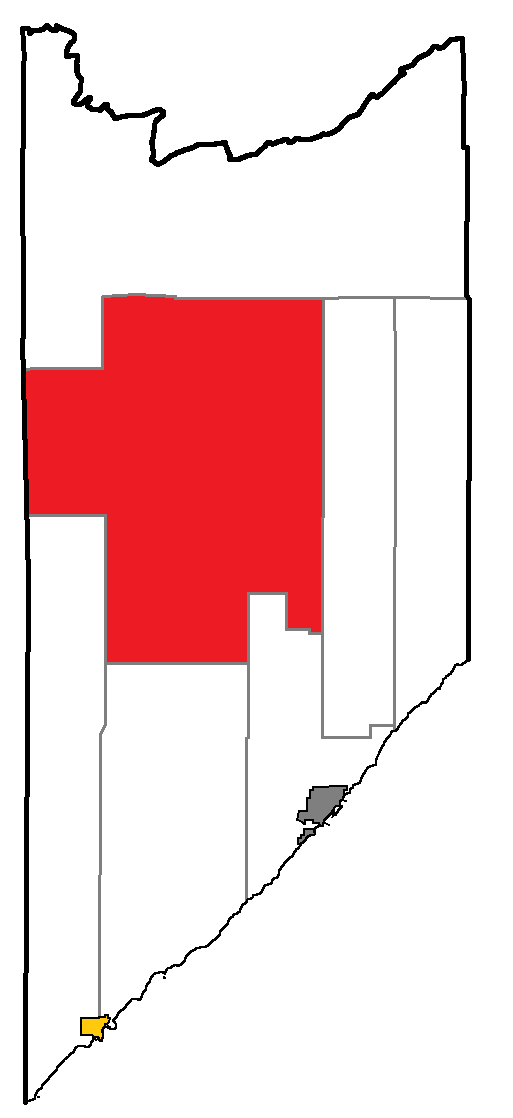
- Location of Stony River Township within Lake County, Minnesota
- Coordinates: 47°40′54″N 91°31′31″W
- Country: United States
- State: Minnesota
- County: Lake

Area
  - Total: 578.9 sq mi (1,499.3 km^{2})
  - Land: 547.7 sq mi (1,418.5 km^{2})
  - Water: 31.2 sq mi (80.7 km^{2})
- Elevation: 1,703 ft (519 m)

Population (2020)
  - Total: 172
  - Density: 0.314/sq mi (0.121/km^{2})
- Time zone: UTC-6 (Central (CST))
  - Summer (DST): UTC-5 (CDT)
- FIPS code: 27-62995
- GNIS feature ID: 0665720

Stony River Township is a township in Lake County, Minnesota, United States. The population was 172 at the 2020 census.

== Geography ==
According to the United States Census Bureau, the township has a total area of 578.9 square miles (1,499.3 km^{2}), of which 547.7 square miles (1,418.5 km^{2}) is land and 31.2 square miles (80.7 km^{2} or 5.38%) is water. It is the largest township in land area in Minnesota, although Fall Lake Township (also in Lake County) and Angle Township (in Lake of the Woods County) both have a larger total area because they have more water area.

=== Climate ===
Isabella, Minnesota is a community in the Stony River Township.

Climate data for Isabella 1 W, Minnesota, 1991–2004 normals, 1957-2004 extremes: 2010ft (613m)
Month	Jan	Feb	Mar	Apr	May	Jun	Jul	Aug	Sep	Oct	Nov	Dec	Year
Record high °F (°C)	51 (11)	57 (14)	66 (19)	85 (29)	92 (33)	98 (37)	95 (35)	96 (36)	93 (34)	81 (27)	75 (24)	52 (11)	98 (37)
Mean maximum °F (°C)	34.4 (1.3)	44.0 (6.7)	55.8 (13.2)	69.4 (20.8)	80.9 (27.2)	85.1 (29.5)	87.6 (30.9)	85.2 (29.6)	80.9 (27.2)	72.3 (22.4)	51.9 (11.1)	40.2 (4.6)	90.1 (32.3)
Mean daily maximum °F (°C)	16.8 (−8.4)	25.4 (−3.7)	35.2 (1.8)	47.0 (8.3)	61.9 (16.6)	70.2 (21.2)	73.9 (23.3)	72.9 (22.7)	64.3 (17.9)	50.2 (10.1)	33.7 (0.9)	23.8 (−4.6)	47.9 (8.8)
Daily mean °F (°C)	4.2 (−15.4)	12.6 (−10.8)	22.7 (−5.2)	35.4 (1.9)	49.9 (9.9)	58.9 (14.9)	63.1 (17.3)	62.1 (16.7)	53.8 (12.1)	40.3 (4.6)	25.2 (−3.8)	14.6 (−9.7)	36.9 (2.7)
Mean daily minimum °F (°C)	−7.9 (−22.2)	−0.2 (−17.9)	10.2 (−12.1)	23.8 (−4.6)	37.8 (3.2)	47.5 (8.6)	52.2 (11.2)	51.2 (10.7)	43.4 (6.3)	30.4 (−0.9)	16.7 (−8.5)	5.0 (−15.0)	25.8 (−3.4)
Mean minimum °F (°C)	−27.6 (−33.1)	−23.8 (−31.0)	−12.2 (−24.6)	7.4 (−13.7)	22.9 (−5.1)	32.4 (0.2)	40.1 (4.5)	39.3 (4.1)	27.7 (−2.4)	16.0 (−8.9)	−2.4 (−19.1)	−22.3 (−30.2)	−31.2 (−35.1)
Record low °F (°C)	−42 (−41)	−43 (−42)	−34 (−37)	−9 (−23)	9 (−13)	18 (−8)	33 (1)	27 (−3)	21 (−6)	−8 (−22)	−25 (−32)	−40 (−40)	−43 (−42)
Average precipitation inches (mm)	1.20 (30)	1.05 (27)	1.36 (35)	2.23 (57)	2.98 (76)	3.50 (89)	4.53 (115)	3.32 (84)	3.60 (91)	2.81 (71)	1.76 (45)	1.03 (26)	29.37 (746)
Average snowfall inches (cm)	18.4 (47)	12.9 (33)	10.9 (28)	8.3 (21)	0.5 (1.3)	0.1 (0.25)	0.0 (0.0)	0.0 (0.0)	0.0 (0.0)	3.1 (7.9)	15.0 (38)	14.3 (36)	83.5 (212.45)
Source: XMACIS (temp records/averages, monthly max/mins & precip/snowfall)

== Demographics ==
As of the census of 2000, there were 179 people, 87 households, and 56 families residing in the township. The population density was 0.3 people per square mile (0.1/km^{2}). There were 338 housing units at an average density of 0.6/sq mi (0.2/km^{2}). The racial makeup of the township was 92.74% White, 5.59% Native American, and 1.68% from two or more races. Hispanic or Latino of any race were 1.12% of the population.

There were 87 households, out of which 18.4% had children under the age of 18 living with them, 57.5% were married couples living together, 3.4% had a female householder with no husband present, and 35.6% were non-families. 31.0% of all households were made up of individuals, and 9.2% had someone living alone who was 65 years of age or older. The average household size was 2.06 and the average family size was 2.52.

In the township the population was spread out, with 12.8% under the age of 18, 5.0% from 18 to 24, 23.5% from 25 to 44, 42.5% from 45 to 64, and 16.2% who were 65 years of age or older. The median age was 48 years. For every 100 females, there were 101.1 males. For every 100 females age 18 and over, there were 108.0 males.

The median income for a household in the township was $36,563, and the median income for a family was $43,750. Males had a median income of $29,821 versus $30,417 for females. The per capita income for the township was $16,558. None of the families and 3.5% of the population were living below the poverty line, including no under eighteens and 21.1% of those over 64.
