= Silver Bay, Minnesota =

City in Minnesota, United States

- City
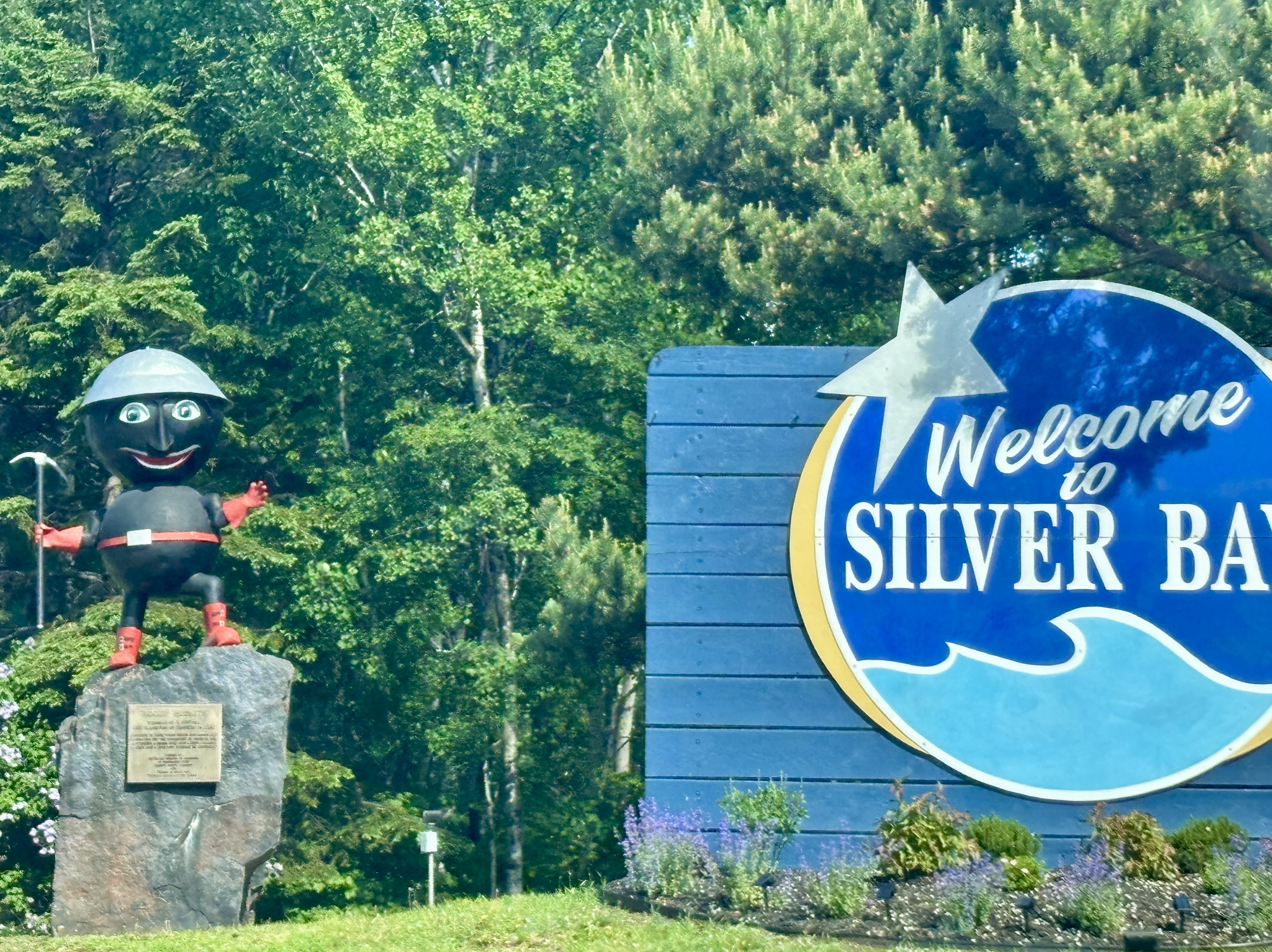
- Welcome to Silver Bay sign and Rocky Taconite statue

- Logo

- Location of the city of Silver Bay within Lake County, Minnesota
- Coordinates: 47°17′33″N 91°16′22″W
- Country: United States
- State: Minnesota
- County: Lake

Area
  - Total: 8.06 sq mi (20.88 km^{2})
  - Land: 7.63 sq mi (19.76 km^{2})
  - Water: 0.43 sq mi (1.12 km^{2})
- Elevation: 764 ft (233 m)

Population (2020)
  - Total: 1,857
  - Estimate (2021): 1,858
  - Density: 243.4/sq mi (93.99/km^{2})
- Time zone: UTC-6 (CST)
  - Summer (DST): UTC-5 (CDT)
- ZIP code: 55614
- Area code: 218
- FIPS code: 27-60250
- GNIS feature ID: 0658258
- Website: silverbay.com

Silver Bay is a city in Lake County, Minnesota, United States. The population was 1,857 at the time of the 2020 census. It is the largest population center in a natural tourism area which includes Tettegouche State Park and the Split Rock Lighthouse. While Silver Bay is a port along Lake Superior for iron ore, it does not have taconite mining facilities of its own. However, the town does have a processing plant ran by Cleveland-Cliffs.

The North Shore National Scenic Drive runs through town.

== History ==
The city of Silver Bay was founded on May 1, 1954, after previously being known as the Beaver Bay housing project. The company town was built to process taconite mined and shipped by train from Babbitt, Minnesota, 60 miles to the northwest.

Silver Bay attained widespread publicity in the 1960s when it was discovered that the Reserve Corporation was dumping taconite tailings into Lake Superior. In 1972, they were forced to stop and charged with violating the Rivers and Harbors Act of 1899, which prohibited the dumping of harmful materials into interstate waters. In 1977, after a long trial, a new waste-storage facility was built 7 miles inland. It is often referred to as “Mile Post 7".

In 2015, the taconite tailing-rich Black Beach opened to the public, with the negotiation with the mining company for public access to the beaches in the area being brokered by the city of Silver Bay and the state DNR. Black Beach Park contains three beaches and a municipally owned campground.

== Geography ==
According to the United States Census Bureau, the city has a total area of 8.36 square miles (21.65 km^{2}), of which 7.89 square miles (20.44 km^{2}) is land and 0.47 square miles (1.22 km^{2}) is water.

Silver Bay is located 28 miles northeast of Two Harbors, 54 miles northeast of Duluth, 55 miles southwest of Grand Marais, and about 100 miles south of the Canadian border. It is about halfway between Duluth and Grand Marais, along the North Shore of Lake Superior.

Tettegouche State Park, the Baptism River, and the Palisade Head rock formation are all nearby.

Summer hiking trails, winter cross country skiing, maintained snowmobile trails, multiple parks, a hockey arena, and four baseball/softball fields are located within Silver Bay.

== Demographics ==
Historical population
Census	Pop.	Note	%±
1960	3,723		—
1970	3,504		−5.9%
1980	2,917		−16.8%
1990	1,894		−35.1%
2000	2,068		9.2%
2010	1,887		−8.8%
2020	1,857		−1.6%
2021 (est.)	1,858		0.1%
U.S. Decennial Census; 2020 Census

=== 2020 census ===
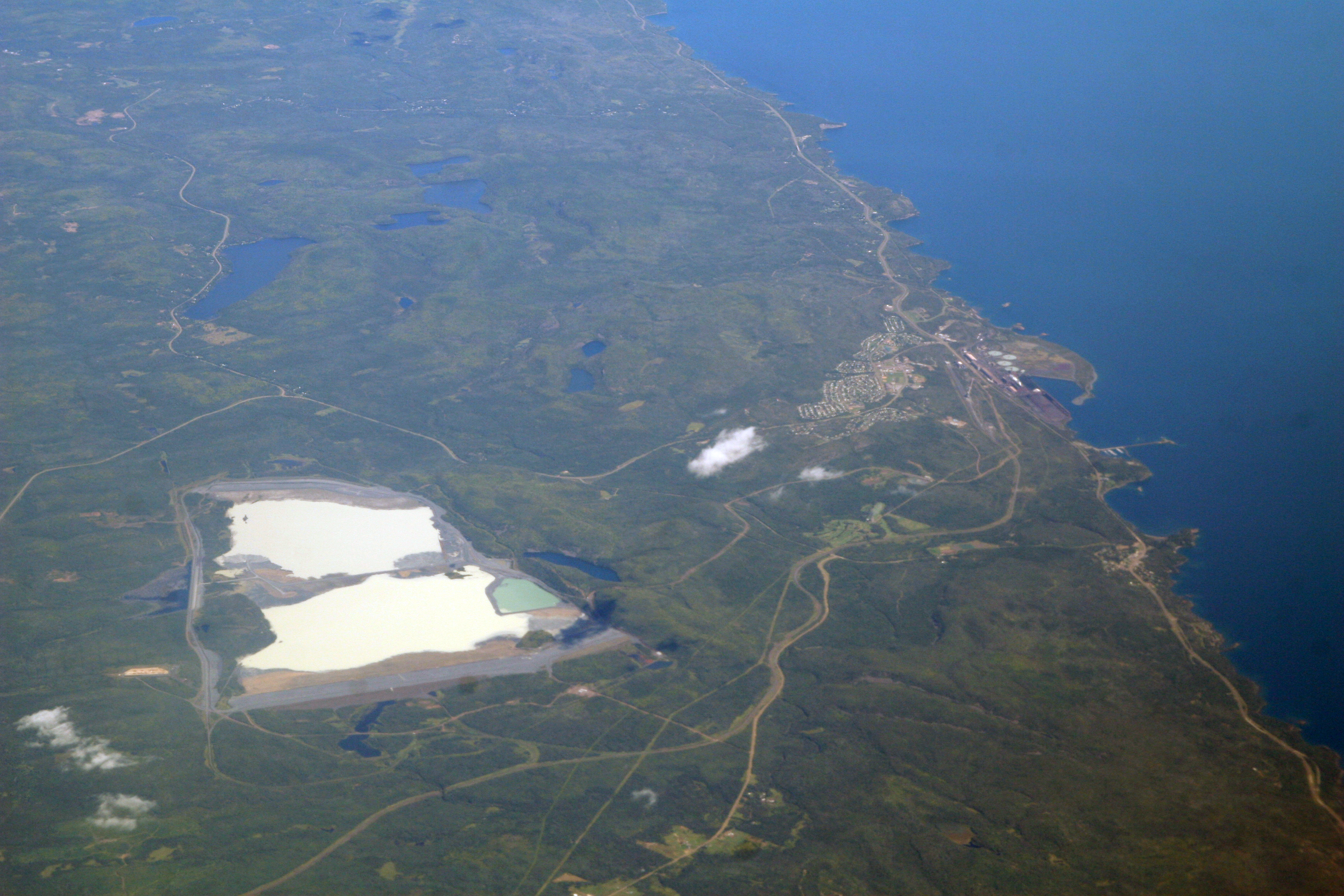
Silver Bay and its taconite tailings ponds, 2010

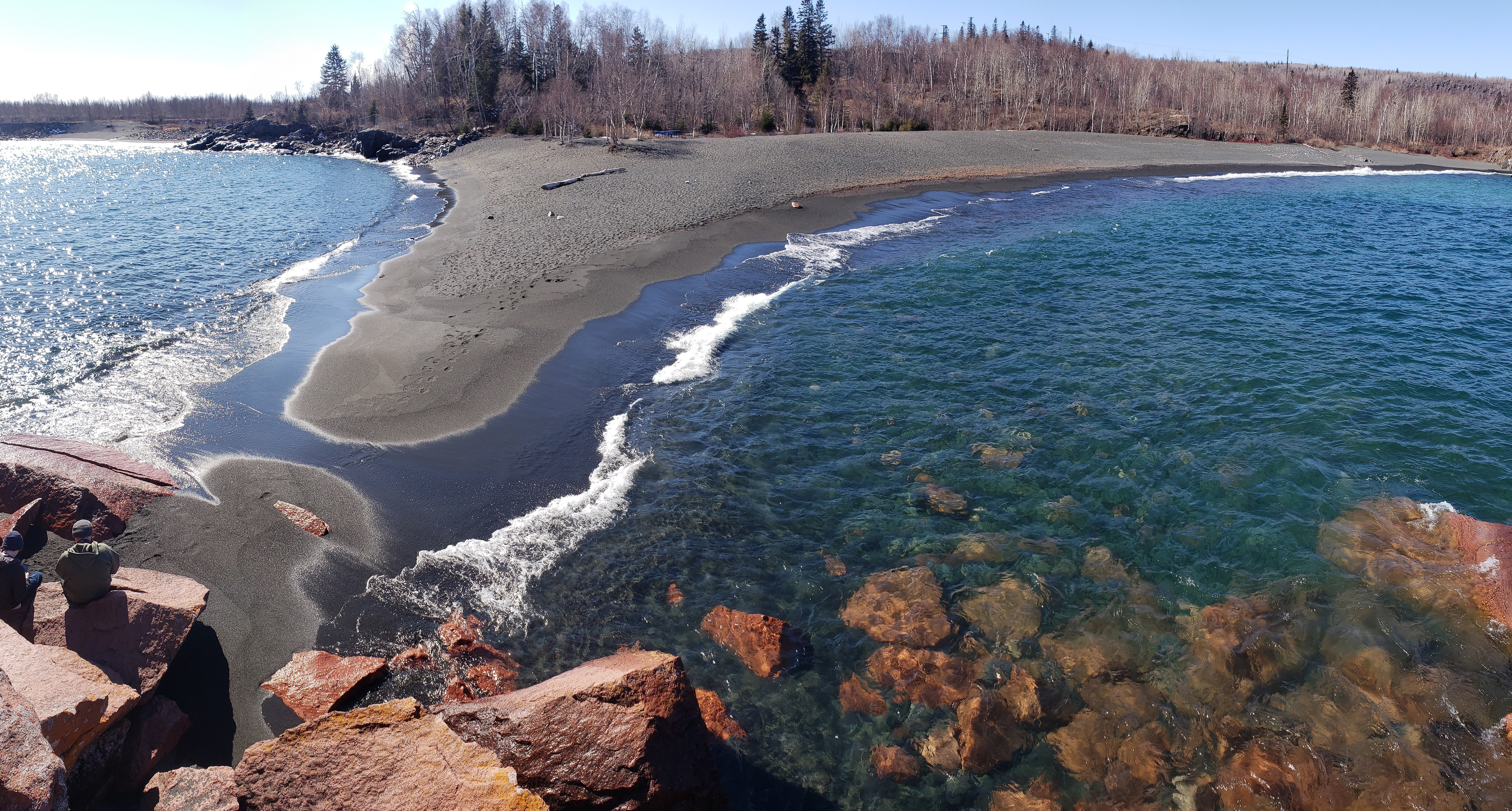
Black Beach, named for the darkly-colored taconite tailings in its sand, is now a popular tourist attraction

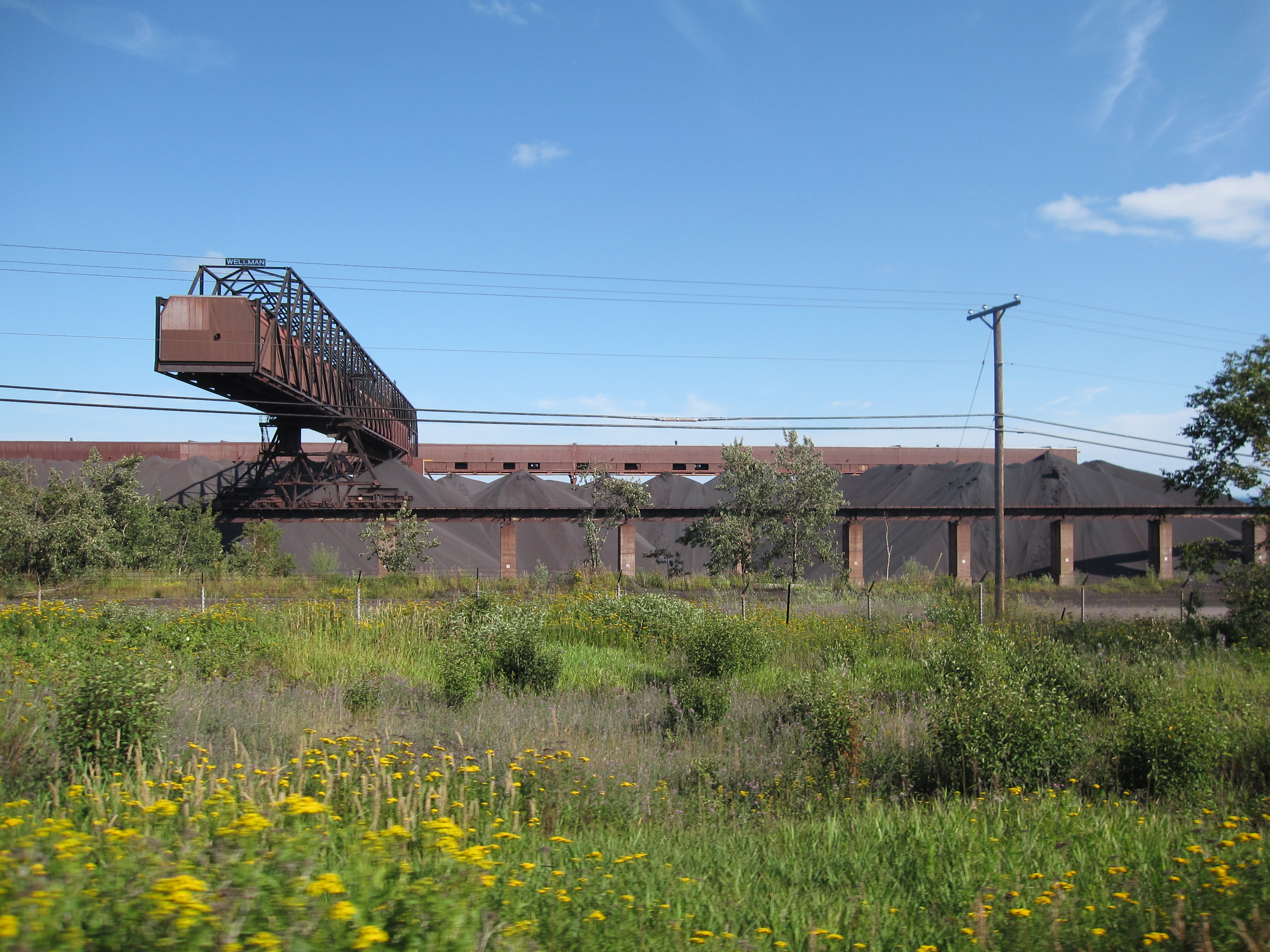
Taconite Plant in Silver Bay

As of the 2020 census, Silver Bay had a population of 1,857. The median age was 50.4 years. 19.5% of residents were under the age of 18 and 28.2% of residents were 65 years of age or older. For every 100 females there were 110.3 males, and for every 100 females age 18 and over there were 111.2 males age 18 and over.

0.0% of residents lived in urban areas, while 100.0% lived in rural areas.

There were 833 households in Silver Bay, of which 20.9% had children under the age of 18 living in them. Of all households, 45.6% were married-couple households, 23.9% were households with a male householder and no spouse or partner present, and 24.6% were households with a female householder and no spouse or partner present. About 37.6% of all households were made up of individuals and 20.6% had someone living alone who was 65 years of age or older.

There were 980 housing units, of which 15.0% were vacant. The homeowner vacancy rate was 3.2% and the rental vacancy rate was 1.9%.

Racial composition as of the 2020 census
Race	Number	Percent
White	1,769	95.3%
Black or African American	3	0.2%
American Indian and Alaska Native	4	0.2%
Asian	13	0.7%
Native Hawaiian and Other Pacific Islander	0	0.0%
Some other race	6	0.3%
Two or more races	62	3.3%
Hispanic or Latino (of any race)	18	1.0%

=== 2010 census ===
As of the census of 2010, there were 1,887 people, 836 households, and 542 families living in the city. The population density was 239.2 inhabitants per square mile (92.4/km^{2}). There were 974 housing units at an average density of 123.4 per square mile (47.6/km^{2}). The racial makeup of the city was 97.9% White, 0.2% African American, 0.3% Native American, 0.3% Asian, 0.3% from other races, and 1.0% from two or more races. Hispanic or Latino of any race were 0.9% of the population.

There were 836 households, of which 22.8% had children under the age of 18 living with them, 53.3% were married couples living together, 6.7% had a female householder with no husband present, 4.8% had a male householder with no wife present, and 35.2% were non-families. 31.7% of all households were made up of individuals, and 15.9% had someone living alone who was 65 years of age or older. The average household size was 2.17 and the average family size was 2.69.

The median age in the city was 50.1 years. 18.4% of residents were under the age of 18; 6.9% were between the ages of 18 and 24; 17.4% were from 25 to 44; 28.6% were from 45 to 64; and 28.8% were 65 years of age or older. The gender makeup of the city was 51.8% male and 48.2% female.

=== 2000 census ===
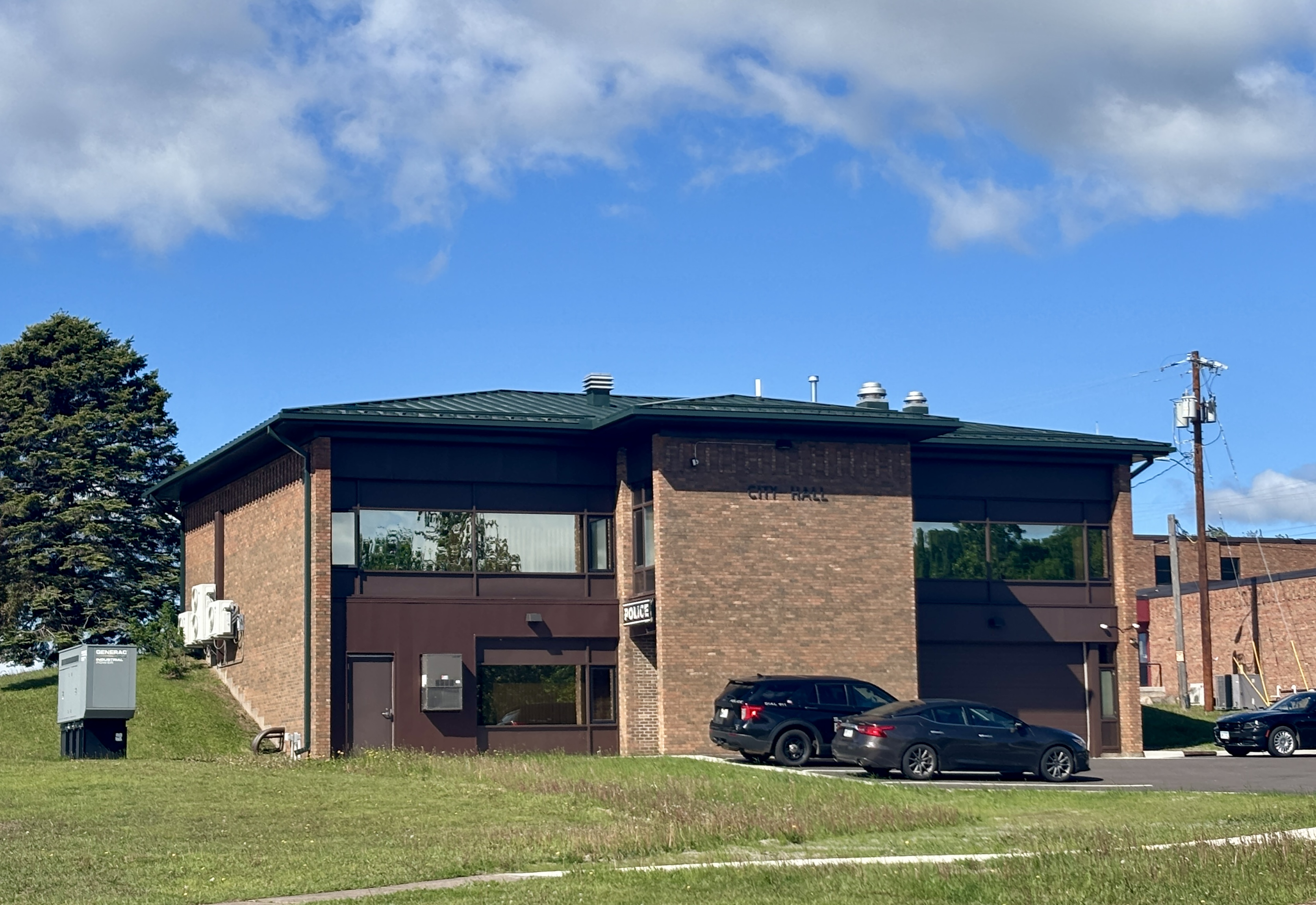
City hall

As of the census of 2000, there were 2,068 people, 844 households, and 589 families living in the city. The population density was 268.0 inhabitants per square mile (103.5/km^{2}). There were 933 housing units at an average density of 120.9 per square mile (46.7/km^{2}). The racial makeup of the city was 97.68% White, 0.05% African American, 1.11% Native American, 0.15% Asian, 0.05% Pacific Islander, 0.10% from other races, and 0.87% from two or more races. Hispanic or Latino of any race were 0.68% of the population. Germans comprised 22.2% of the population, 18.1% Norwegian, 11.5% Swedish, 6.5% Finnish, 6.4% American, 6.1% Irish, and 5.2% English ancestry.

There were 844 households, out of which 28.2% had children under the age of 18 living with them, 59.8% were married couples living together, 7.1% had a female householder with no husband present, and 30.1% were non-families. Individuals comprised 27.6% of all households, and 14.3% had someone living alone who was 65 years of age or older. The average household size was 2.35 and the average family size was 2.85.

In the city, the population was spread out, with 24.4% under the age of 18, 4.3% from 18 to 24, 23.4% from 25 to 44, 20.8% from 45 to 64, and 27.2% who were 65 years of age or older. The median age was 44 years. For every 100 females, there were 104.8 males. For every 100 females age 18 and over, there were 105.8 males.

The median income for a household in the city was $36,524, and the median income for a family was $41,667. Males had a median income of $40,655 versus $25,809 for females. The per capita income for the city was $16,958. About 5.3% of families and 6.8% of the population were below the poverty line, including 8.5% of those under age 18 and 2.9% of those age 65 or over.

== Infrastructure ==
=== Transportation ===
Silver Bay was served by the Silver Bay Municipal Airport until it closed on June 7, 2018, for an indefinite amount of time.

Outer Drive (County Road 5), Penn Boulevard, and Minnesota Highway 61 are three of the main routes in Silver Bay.
