= LACS =

LACS may refer to:

- Lacunar Stroke Syndrome
- League Against Cruel Sports in the UK, campaigns against fox hunting etc.
- Lehman Alternative Community School, a combined middle and high school in Ithaca, New York
- Locatable Address Conversion System, a U.S. Postal Service update mechanism
- Luxembourg American Cultural Society, a Luxembourgish-American organization based in Belgium, Wisconsin

Lacs may refer to:

- Lacs Region, a region of Côte d'Ivoire
- Lacs District, a district of Côte d'Ivoire
- Lacs, Indre, a commune in France
- Lacs Prefecture, Togo
- The Lacs, an American country rap duo

== See also ==
- LAC (disambiguation)
- Lac (disambiguation)
- Lakh, a unit in the Indian numbering system
- Laks (disambiguation)
- Lax (disambiguation)
