= Address format by country and area =

List of standard postal address formats

This is a list of address formats by country and area in alphabetical order.

== A ==
=== Argentina ===
In Argentina, an address must be mailed this way:

Format	Example
Name; Street name, number Complements, Neighbourhood (if needed); Postal code, Municipality	Luis Escala; Piedras 623; Piso 2, depto 4 C1070AAM, Capital Federal

The postal code has been changed from a four digit format to an eight digit format, which is shown in the example. The new format adds a district or province letter code at the beginning, which allows it to be identified. As the system has been changed recently, the four digit format can still be used: in that case it is necessary to add the name of the province or district.

Old Format (4d)	New Format (8d)
Luis Escala; French 392; Banfield (1828); Lomas de Zamora, Pcia Buenos Aires	Luis Escala; French 392; Banfield; B1828HKH, Lomas de Zamora

=== Australia ===
In common with the rest of the English-speaking world, addresses in Australia put the street number—which may be a range—before the street name, and the placename before the postcode. Unlike addresses in most other comparable places, the city is not included in the address, but rather a much more fine-grained locality is used, usually referred to in Australia as a suburb or locality – although these words are understood in a different way than in other countries. Because the suburb or town serves to locate the street or delivery type, the postcode serves only as routing information rather than to distinguish previous other parts of an address. As an example, there are around 8,000 localities in Victoria (cf. List of localities in Victoria and List of Melbourne suburbs), yet around 700 unique geographic postcodes. For certain large volume receivers or post offices, the "locality" may be an institution or street name. It is always considered incorrect to include the city or metropolis name in an address (unless this happens to be the name of the suburb), and doing so may delay delivery.

Australia Post recommends that the last line of the address should be set in capital letters. In Australia, subunits are essential and should be separated from the street by two spaces; apartments, flats and units are typically separated with a forward slash (/) instead.

Apartment, flat and unit numbers, if necessary, are shown immediately prior to the street number (which might be a range), and, as noted above, are separated from the street number by a forward slash. These conventions can cause confusion. To clarify, 3/17 Adam Street would mean Apartment 3 (before the slash) at 17 Adam Street (in the case of a residential address) or Unit 3 at 17 Adam St (in the case of a business park). On the other hand, 3–17 Adam Street would specify a large building (or cluster of related buildings) occupying the lots spanning street numbers 3 to 17 on one side of Adam St (without specifying any particular place within the buildings). These forms can be combined, so 3/5–9 Eve Street signifies Apartment 3 (before the slash) in a building which spans street numbers 5 to 9 on one side of Eve Street.

As in the US, the state/territory is crucial information as many placenames are reused in different states/territories; it is usually separated from the suburb with two spaces and abbreviated. In printed matter, the postcode follows after two spaces; in handwritten matter, the postcode should be written in the boxes provided.

Format	Example
Street address
Recipient Name; Other recipient information (etc.); Street (Subunit Number Name); Locality State Postcode	Ms H Williams; Finance and Accounting; Australia Post; 219–241 Cleveland St; STRAWBERRY HILLS NSW 1427
Other delivery type
Recipient Name; Other recipient information (etc.); Type Number; Locality State Postcode	Mr J. O'Donnell; Lighthouse Promotions; PO Box 215; SPRINGVALE VIC 3171

In addition to PO Boxes, other delivery types (which are typically abbreviated) may include:

Delivery type	Abbreviation
Care of post office	CARE PO
Community mail bag	CMB
General Post Box (in capital cities)	GPO BOX
Mail service	MS
Roadside delivery	RSD
Roadside mail service	RMS
Community mail agent	CMA
Community postal agent	CPA
Locked bag	LOCKED BAG
Roadside mail box/bag	RMB
Private bag	PRIVATE BAG

Australian Post Addressing Guidelines

In rural areas, "Property numbers are worked out based on the distance from the start of the road to the entrance of the property. That distance (in metres) is divided by ten. Even numbers are on the right and odd numbers are on the left. For example: the entrance to a property 5,080 metres from the start of the road on the right hand side becomes number 508. The start of the road is determined as the fastest and safest road accessed from the nearest major road or town. Rural road maps are being drawn up to define the name, the start point and direction of every rural road."

=== Austria ===
In Austria, the address is generally formatted as follows:

Format	Example
Addressee (Natural person/Organization); More detailed description of addressee (optional); Street name + number Postal code + town Country (if other than Austria)	Firma ABC; Kundendienst; Hauptstr. 5; 1234 Musterstadt

The postal code always consists of four digits.

== B ==
=== Bangladesh ===
In Bangladesh, the format used for rural and urban addresses is different.

Urban Addresses

Format	Example
Addressee (Natural person/Organization); More detailed description of addressee (optional); Flat Number, Building Name (if available); Street name + number Town + postal code Country (for international mail)	Sheikh Mujibur Rahman -- -- Dhanmondi. 32; Dhaka-1209; Bangladesh

The postal code always consists of four digits.

Rural Addresses

Format	Example
Name; More detailed description of addressee (optional); Village Name; Post office Thana Name; District Name; Country (for international mail)	Sheikh Mujibur Rahman -- Village: Tungipara; P.O.: Tungipara; Thana: Tungipara; District: Gopalganj; Bangladesh

=== Belarus ===
In Belarus, some neighbourhoods may be planned in such a way that some, or most, apartment buildings don't face a named street. In this case, a number of expedients can be used. In older neighbourhoods, a "main" building may have the same number as one or more "subsidiary" buildings accessible via driveways behind the main building. They will be addressed as vul. Lenina, d. 123 (123 Lenin St) An address may also cover one or more subsidiary buildings behind the main building, addressed as vul. Lenina, d. 123, bud. 2 (123 Lenin St, unit 2, where bud. (abbreviation for будынак, budynak) means a '(subsidiary) building'). In newer areas with more regular street plans, apartment buildings that do not face a named street may be designated with Cyrillic letters appended to the building number, e.g. 123-а, 123-б, etc., in Cyrillic alphabetical order.

In some microraion neighbourhoods, with few, if any, buildings facing named streets, the name (or more likely number of the microraion (planned housing development)) would be used instead of the street name; thus someone may live at 4-th microrayon, d. 123, kv. 56, i.e. 123 – 4th Microraion, apt. 56.

Format	Cyrillic example	Latin example
Name of addressee Street name, number, apartment/room Village (in rural areas when different from post office); Postal code, post office (in rural areas) or city/town Raion; Region; Country (for international mail)	Свістунову Івану Пятровічу вул. Цэнтральная, д. 20 в. Караліставічы; 223016, п/а Новы Двор; Мінскага р-на. Мінскай вобл. Беларусь (BELARUS)	Svistunov Ivan Piatrovič vul. Centraĺnaja, d. 20 v. Karalistavičy; 223016, p/a Novy Dvor; Minskaha r-na Minskaj vobl. BELARUS

Source: Belposhta

=== Belgium ===
In Belgium, the address starts with the most specific information (addressee individual identification) and ends with the most general information (postcode and town for domestic mail or country for cross border mail.) Spatial information of a physical address (including building, wing, stairwell, floor and door) may be useful for internal path of delivery, but is not allowed in the delivery point location line (i.e. the line containing street, number and box number). If needed, this information will appear on a line above the delivery point location line.

The street number is placed after the thoroughfare name (unlike in France), separated by a space. Separators such as punctuation (point, comma or other signs) or "nº", or "nr" are not allowed. Extension designation (box numbers), if present, appears in the delivery point location line, preceded by the word for "box" (bus in Dutch, bte in French). Symbols such as b, Bt, #, -, / are not allowed as separators between the street number element and the box number element.

Examples of a correctly formatted postal address:

Format	Example (French)	Example (Dutch)
Addressee individual information Function / department (optional); Organization (if applicable); Spatial/dispatching information (if applicable) thoroughfare + street number + box number Postal code + town Country (only for international mail)	Monsieur Alain Dupont; Directeur Service Clients; Acme SA; Bloc A – étage 4 Rue du Vivier 7C bte 5; 1000 Bruxelles; BELGIQUE	Dhr Paul Janssens; Afdeling Kwaliteit; Acme NV; Gebouw A – Verdieping 3 Volklorenlaan 81 bus 15; 2610 Wilrijk; BELGIË

The Belgian addressing guidelines are registered with the Universal Postal Union (UPU and see the link Universal Postal Union – Postal addressing systems in member countries). These guidelines indicate exactly how to combine the various address components to obtain a correctly formatted postal address.

The complete set of addressing guidelines can be found on the website of the Belgian postal operator (bpost). The correct representation of an address is not limited to the correct structure of address components but also relates to the content of addresses and their position on envelopes (see bpost – Lettres & cartes – Envoi – Comment addresser ? (in French)).

It is also possible to validate a Belgian postal address on bpost's website and to receive feedback on the content and the format of an address.

=== Brazil ===
In Brazil, an address must be written this way:

Format	Example
Name; Street type (avenue/terrace), Street name, number, apartment/room (if needed); Neighbourhood (optional); Municipality, State abbreviation Postal Code	Carlos Rossi; Avenida João Jorge, 112, ap. 31; Vila Industrial; Campinas – SP; 13035-680

States can have their name written in full, abbreviated in some way, or totally abbreviated to two letters (SP = São Paulo, RJ = Rio de Janeiro, etc.).

Only towns with 60,000 inhabitants and above have postal codes individualized for streets, roads, avenues, etc. One street can have several postal codes (by odd/even numbers side or by segment). These postcodes range from −000 to −899. Other towns have only a generic postcode with the suffix −000. Recipients of bulk mail (large companies, condos, etc.) have specific postcodes, with a suffix ranging from −900 to −959. P.O. boxes are mailed to Correios offices, with suffixes ranging from −970 to −979. Some rural settlements have community postboxes with suffix −990.

=== Bulgaria ===
Similar to Belgium and most other European countries, in Bulgaria the address starts with the most specific information (addressee individual identification) and ends with the most general information (town and postcode for domestic mail or country for cross border (international) mail.) Spatial information of a physical address (including building, wing, stairwell, floor and door) may be useful for internal path of delivery, but is not allowed in the delivery point location line (i.e. the line containing street, number and box number). If needed, this information will appear on a line above the delivery point location line.

The street number is placed after the thoroughfare name (unlike in France), separated by a space and the symbol 'No. '. Separators such as punctuation (point, comma or other signs) are allowed if needed. Extension designation (box numbers), if present, appears in the delivery point location line, preceded by the word for "box" ("П.К. {numeral}", "П. К. {numeral}", or "Пощенска кутия {numeral}"). Symbols such as #, -, / are not strictly disallowed as separators between the street number element and the box number element. Note that there may sometimes be a confusion between П.К. (пощенски код, postal code (of the local post office)) and П.К. (пощенска кутия, P.O. (post office box), the individual physical P.O. box of a specific address or a subscription-based physical P.O. box inside a post-office branch).

Format	Format (in Bulgarian)	Example (in Bulgarian)	Example (in English/Latin script, for international mail or parcel deliveries)
Name (personal name, patronymic, surname); Function/department (optional); Company/organization name (if applicable; optional); Spatial/dispatching information (if applicable; usually mandatory); Street name and number, (apartment) block, entrance, floor, apartment/room/flat number Post office box number + neighborhood (optional); Rayon (optional); City/town/village + postal code (P.O. of the post-office); Oblast (optional); COUNTRY (for international mail)	Име, презиме и фамилия Функция/Длъжност, Отдел (незадължително); Организация/фирма (незадължително); Адрес – ул./бул., номер, блок, вход, етаж, апартамент Пощенска кутия (П.К.) + номер и квартал (незадължително); Градски район (незадължително); Наименование на населеното място и Пощенски код (да не се бърка с пощенска кутия (П.К.)); Община (незадължително); Област (незадължително); За международните: и наименованието на държавата.)	(Адрес на подател:); Николай Георгиев Сармаков свещеник към църква "Св. Параскева" ул. "Патриарх Евтимий" No. 1011, бл. 1, вх. 2, ет. 1, ап. 1 П.К. 10117 Стария град (Район Централен); Пловдив 4000 (Община Пловдив) (Област Пловдив); БЪЛГАРИЯ	Nikolay Georgiev Sarmakov priest with the Sv. (Saint) Paraskeva Church; 1011 Patriarh Evtimiy Str. (Patriarch Euthymius), block 1, entrance 2, floor 1, flat (apartment) 1 P.O.(box) 101178 The Old Town (Central District); Plovdiv 4000 (Plovdiv Municipality) (Plovdiv Province); BULGARIA

The convention is that the addressee's information is written on the bottom right portion of the letter. The sender's information is written either on the top left portion of the letter or on the top reverse side of the letter (except for parcel packages).

Domestic post letters, parcels and postal money transfers are written in Bulgarian Cyrillic while the international postal letters and parcels are written in the Latin script (usually in English due to its global usage) with Arabic numerals.

Apart delivering mail and parcel packages to individual addresses, the Bulgarian Posts also delivers to local post offices (which then notify the recipient that he/she has mail to collect from the post office; so-called до поискване (letters on demand/request)) or to a subscription mailbox within a local post office.

Examples of a correctly formatted postal address:

Format for mail exchange between private individuals (между частни абонати):

Format for letters and parcel packages ON REQUEST (до поискване):

Format for mail and parcel exchange between business partners (между бизнес-партньори):

Format for letters and parcel packages ON REQUEST (до поискване):

Format for mail and parcel sending to an individual subscription mailbox within a local office of Bulgarian Posts (до абонаментна кутия):

Format for letters and parcel packages ON REQUEST (до поискване):

The Bulgarian postal addressing guidelines are registered with the Universal Postal Union (UPU and see the link Universal Postal Union – Postal addressing systems in member countries). These guidelines indicate exactly how to combine the various address components to obtain a correctly formatted postal address.

The complete set of addressing guidelines can be found on the website of the Bulgarian postal operator (Bulgarian Posts). The correct representation of an address is not limited to the correct structure of address components but also relates to the content of addresses and their position on envelopes (see Български пощи (Български пощи) (in Bulgarian)).

It is also possible to validate a Bulgarian postal address on Bulgarian Posts' website and to receive feedback on the content and the format of an address. More information can be found at (see Български пощи (in Bulgarian)).

== C ==
=== Canada ===
Addressing guidelines are a standard issued by Canada Post, but their use can differ between English- and French-speaking populations in Canada. Here are some formatting rules that are constant:

- Cardinal directions like North, North West, etc. can be abbreviated in either English or French, and appear after the street name. Ordinal numbered streets (e.g. 6th, 2nd) can be written in either English or French.
- If there is an apartment number it should be written before the house number and separated by a hyphen.
- Proper nouns like street names should not be translated out of their original language. The only exceptions to this rule are: Street, Avenue, and Boulevard which use their French equivalents and vice versa. (e.g., "rue principale" should be written as "Principale St" in an English address, but never as "Main St.")
- Name of city or town followed by two letter provincial abbreviations
- Postal codes come in a letter-number-letter-space-number-letter-number format, for example: A1A 1A1. There should be two spaces between the province abbreviation and the postal code.
- If sending a parcel from outside Canada, the word "CANADA" must be placed at the very bottom.

See the example below for a comparison of the English and French address formats:

English (from Canada Post):

NICOLE MARTIN
123 SHERBROOKE ST
TORONTO ON L3R 9P6

French (from Postes Canada):

CLAUDE M UNTEL
10–123 RUE MAIN SE
MONTRÉAL QC H3Z 2Y7

The Province of Québec, which does not itself conduct postal operations, maintains that the French address format should differ from the actual French format published by Postes Canada. (from the OQLF):

Monsieur Jean-Pierre Lamarre
101–3485, rue de la Montagne
Montréal (Québec)  H3G 2A6

- See Canada Post's Addressing Guidelines for accurate, up-to-date information on the addressing guidelines most commonly used in Canada.
- See the Office québécois de la langue française's Adressage webpage (in French only) for more information about how to write an address according to guidelines from the government of Québec.

=== Chile ===
Chilean urban addresses require only the street name, house number, apartment number (if necessary) and municipality; however, more information is frequently included, such as commune (neighbourhood or town) and region. Postal codes are rarely included by people. All postal codes have seven digits, the first three indicating the municipality, the next four identifying a block or in large and scarcely populated areas a quadrant within the municipal territory.

The territories of most of the larger cities comprise several adjacent municipalities, so it is important to mention it.

Format	Example
Recipient name Street and number Apartment (if needed); Postal code (rarely used) Municipality; Region	Sr. Rodrigo Domínguez; Av. Bellavista N° 185; Dep. 609; 8420507 RECOLETA; REGION METROPOLITANA

Smaller cities often consist of only one municipality with several unofficial comunes (neighborhoods) that are usually mentioned even for official addressing purposes.

Format	Example
Recipient name Street and number, Apartment number Neighbourhood; Region	Sra. Isidora Retamal; Nelson N° 10, Dep. 415; CERRO BARON; V REGION VALPARAISO

Several large and mostly rural municipalities contain more than one small town, in such cases, the recipient address must mention either the town, the postal code or both.

Format	Example
Recipient name Street and number Postal code Town or village Region	Inversiones Aldunate y Cía. S.A. Los Aromos N° 12185; 25000311 MAITENCILLO; V REGION VALPARAISO

In other towns or rural communities there are no house numbers and addresses are generally identified by company name followed by only a street name follow by some reference point.

Format	Example
Recipient name Street and rest of address information Postal code Town or village Region	Sra. Isidora Retamal; Camino Publico S/N, Tunca Arriba; 2970000 SAN VICENT DE T.T. VI REGION O'HIGGINS

=== China ===
In mainland China, the postal area when written in Chinese characters (preferably Simplified Chinese characters), has the big-endian order, which means that the Chinese-language address is written from the largest geographical area to the smallest geographical area. The Chinese-language address format is:

Province, prefecture-level city, district or county (sometimes omitted), township or town or subdistrict (often omitted), village or community (usually omitted), road name, road number, building name, floor/level, room number

However, as a member of the Universal Postal Union (UPU), China Post also supports UPU's English-language address in the little-endian order, which means that English-language address is written from the smallest geographical area to the largest geographical area. The English-language address format is:

Room number, floor/level, building name
road number, road name, village or community (usually omitted), township or town or subdistrict (often omitted)
district or county (sometimes omitted), prefecture-level city
postcode and province
country name

Chinese domestic letters only support Chinese-language address in the big-endian order. The example is:

Format	Chinese example	Literal meaning (in Chinese word order)
Postcode (written in squares in the upper left corner); Province, Prefecture-level city, County, Town, Road Name, Road Number; Recipient's name, Title, The character "收" (receive)	3 5 0 5 0 3 福建省福州市连江县丹阳镇新洋村团结路10号 陈立国 先生 收	350503; Fujian Province, Fuzhou City, Lianjiang County, Danyang Town, Xinyang Village, Tuanjie Road, 10th number CHEN Liguo, mister, receive

The international letters to China support English-language address in the little-endian order. The example is:

Format	English example
Recipient; Road Number, Road Name, Village, Town; County, Prefecture-level city Postcode, PROVINCE; COUNTRY	Mr. CHEN Liguo; No. 10 Tuanjie Road, Xinyang Village, Danyang Town; Lianjiang County, Fuzhou City; 350503 FUJIAN; P.R. CHINA

=== Colombia ===
In Colombia the address format uses a numeric format based on calles which increase the number from south to north and carreras which increase the number from east to west.

Format	Example
Calle number Number of the Carrera and the house City	Calle 34 #24 – 30; Bogotá

=== Croatia ===
Croatian Post recommends the following format:

Format	Example
Addressee (individual or organization); Locality (if applicable and different from post office name); Floor and door (only if necessary); Street name + house number Postal code + post office name Country (if sent internationally)	Hrvoje Horvat; Soblinec; 1. kat, stan 2 Soblinečka ulica 1; 10360 SESVETE; CROATIA

Croatia uses five-digit postal code numbers. The Croatian postal service recommends using 2-letter ISO country codes as prefixes before international and domestic postal codes, though the practice is not mandatory.

=== Czech Republic ===
Common format in the Czech Republic:

Format	Example
(Company + department); Name; Street name (or village name) + number Postal code + Town (or post office)	První informační Josef Novák; Brněnská 2256/16; 123 07 Jitrnice

Postal codes are in the format "### ##" (i.e. 158 00 = Prague 58) or "CZ-#####" (especially for international mail). On pre-printed Czech postcards and envelopes, the postal code is written on a separate last row in boxes for each number. If the envelope doesn't have pre-printed rows and boxes, the postal code should be before the town (or post office) name.

On private letters, the first line is usually constituted by a courtesy title (pan, paní, slečna, žák...) For private mails addressed to the workplace, the order is (name + company), while in official mails it is (company + name).

The basic system of house numbering uses conscription house numbers (čísla popisná, čp. or č. p.). For a temporary or recreational house, an evidentional house number (číslo evidenční, ev. č. or če., or distinguished by initial 0 or E prefix) is used instead. In most larger cities and also in some towns and large villages with street names, there is a double system of house numbering. The first number is the conscription or evidentional number (which corresponds to the chronological order of cadastral registration of the house), and the second number (after a slash) is the orientational number (orientační číslo, č. or., č. o.) which expresses the position in the street. Sometimes only one of the two numbers is used, or the numbers are used in reverse order, and it can be difficult to distinguish which number is which. Generally, orientation numbers (if they exist) are preferred for mail services.

How to correctly address mail

== D ==
=== Denmark ===
In Denmark, apartment buildings will usually have two or three apartments per floor. Thus, if the addressee lives in an apartment, the address should contain the floor they live on, and a side (t.v., mf. or t.h., meaning "to the left", "in the middle" and "to the right", respectively) or an alphanumeric character (1, 2, 3... or A, B, C...= starting from left seen from the top most step just before the floor).

Also, for postal codes 2000 and up, there is a 1:1 relationship between postal code and town.

Format	Example
Name; Street name + number + apartment floor and t.h./mf./t.v. (optional); Postal code + town	Stig Jensen; Solvej 5, 4. t.v. 5250 Odense SV

== E ==
=== Estonia ===
In Estonia, use the following format.

Format	Example
Name; Street + Building number + apartment number Postal code + town COUNTRY (in English or French; if other than Estonia)	Kati Kask; Aia tn 1–23; 10615 Tallinn; ESTONIA

== F ==
=== Finland ===
Format	Example
Company; Name or Department; Street name + number + *apartment number Postal code + Town (uppercase); Country (if other than Finland)	Eduskunta; Matti Mallikainen; Mannerheimintie 30 as. 1; 00100 HELSINKI; Finland

In Finland, if a person's name is written before the company name in the address field of a letter, then that person is considered the recipient. In this case, no other employee is allowed to open the letter but the indicated recipient. If the company name is before the person's name, then the company is the recipient and any employee is allowed to open the letter.

The apartment number can formatted as "as 5" (as is an abbreviation for asunto, apartment) or as "C 55" (the letter indicates the correct staircase in apartment blocks with several entrances.)

Finland uses a five-digit postal code. Some larger companies and organizations have their own postal codes.

=== France ===
In France, the address is generally formatted as follows:

Format	Example
Addressee (Natural person/Organization); More detailed description of addressee (optional); House number + Street name Postal code + uppercase location Country (if other than France)	Entreprise ABC; M. Frank Bender; 12 rue de la Montagne; 01234 EXAMPLEVILLE

The postal code always consists of five digits. The location is usually a town, but may be other territorial entities (up to a département)

Organisations, government agencies, and companies which receive large amounts of mail often have a special CEDEX address which goes after the last line (for instance, "75001 PARIS CEDEX").

== G ==
=== Germany ===
In Germany, the address is generally formatted as follows:

Format	Example
Addressee (Natural person/Organization); More detailed description of addressee (optional); Street name + number Postal code + town Country (if other than Germany)	Firma ABC; Kundendienst; Hauptstr. 5; 01234 Musterstadt

- The postal code always consists of five digits.
- Organizations that receive large amounts of mail may be assigned a bulk customer postal code. These are different from regular postal codes in that they do not have a street name line. Some bulk customer postal codes are shared between several organizations.
- There are a few places that have house numbers but no street names (e.g. Baltrum) as well as addresses that have a street name but no house number.
- Some (but not all) private post companies are also able to deliver to Deutsche Post-operated P.O. boxes.
- Post codes follow the structure of DPAG's mail routing, not administrative boundaries.
- Each post code is used exclusively for street addresses, P.O. boxes or bulk recipients.
- Sub-building information, such as apartment numbers, is rarely used—a name on the post box is usually the only method of identification of an addressee within a building.
- If the address is in a village that's part of a larger municipality, there are several ways of writing this. Either the village isn't mentioned at all and the name of the municipality follows after the post code or the village is written after the abbreviation OT for "Ortsteil" (part of town/place). According to DPAG recommendations this should be done in a separate line before the street name but often it's written right after the post code and the name of the larger municipality.

=== Greece ===
Hellenic Post recommends the following format for Greek addresses:

Format	Example (Greek)	Example (Latin)
Recipient; Street name + number Postcode + Town	Πέτρος Παύλου; Δοϊράνης 25; 653 02 Καβάλα	Petros Pavlou; Doiranis 25; 653 02 Kavala

The most widespread format, shown above, gives on the last line the recipient's five-digit post code (with a single space between the third and fourth digits) and the name of the town or village that is the base of a post office, in capital letters and separated from the postcode by two spaces. When sending mail abroad, or when sending mail from abroad to Greece, Hellenic Post recommends the following format:

Format	Example (Greek)	Example (Latin)
Recipient; Street name + number COUNTRY CODE-Postcode, Town; Country	Αποστόλης Αποστόλου; Καρκησίας 6 GR-111 42 Αθήνα; Greece	Apostolis Apostolou; Karkisias 6 GR-111 42 Athina; Greece

As with domestic mail, mail sent from abroad must contain the postcode in the same manner, but the postcode must be preceded by the international prefix of the country of delivery (for Greece, GR). Below the destination, the country of delivery must be written in capital letters, either in English or French (for Greece, GRÈCE or GREECE).

== H ==
=== Hong Kong ===
The official languages of Hong Kong are Chinese and English. For domestic mail within Hong Kong, the address may be written entirely in either Chinese or English. For overseas mail going out from Hong Kong, the address may be written in the language of the destination country, provided that the city name and the country name are in English. However, for an overseas mail from Hong Kong to mainland China, Macao, Taiwan or Singapore, the address may be written entirely in Chinese. While traditional Chinese characters are commonly used in Hong Kong, simplified Chinese characters are also understood by Hong Kong's postmen. Note that Hong Kong does not use any postal codes, though many rural properties have a property identification code, e.g. HKT-12345.

An address written in English should begin with the smallest unit and end with the largest unit, as in the following example for a domestic mail within Hong Kong.

Format	Example
Name of addressee Flat number, Floor number, Name of building (if a rural address: (Flat number, Floor number,) Name/number of house); Street number and street name (if a rural address: Village name); Name of district "Hong Kong", "Hong Kong Island" or "H. K." for Hong Kong Island/"Kowloon" or "Kln" for Kowloon/"New Territories" or "N. T." for New Territories	Mr. Jackie Chan; Flat 25, 12/F, Acacia Building; 150 Kennedy Road; Wan Chai; Hong Kong Island

An address written in Chinese should begin with the largest unit and end with the smallest unit, as in the following example for a piece of domestic mail within Hong Kong. Traditional Chinese characters are used in this example.

Format	Example
[香港, 港島 or 香港島 for Hong Kong Island/九龍 for Kowloon/新界 for New Territories] [Name of district] [Street name][Street number] (if a rural address: [Village name]) [Name of building][Floor number][Flat number] (if a rural address: [House name/number] ([Floor number][Flat number])) [Name of addressee]	香港島 灣仔 堅尼地道105號 雅佳大廈12樓25室 陳港生先生

For mail to Hong Kong from overseas, "Hong Kong" should be added at the end of an address written in English, and 香港 should be added at the beginning of an address written in Chinese.

=== Hungary ===
In Hungarian mail addresses, the city/town name precedes the street address. The post code then comes after the street address.

Format	Example
Addressee (name or company name); City or town Street name and number and floor/door, or P.O. Box number Postal code	Kis Zoltán; Budapest; Árpád fejedelem útja 82. fszt. 2; 1036

Hungarian family names precede given names in Hungarian. In this example, Kis is the family name.

Sometimes a district number might appear after the name of the city/town.

Various abbreviations might appear in the precise street/building address: for instance, specifying the street type (út, utca, krt., tér, etc.), or em. for emelet (floor), or hrsz for helyrajzi szám (which means Land Registry number, or lot number), or fszt for földszint (ground floor) and so on.

The postal code consists of four digits.

== I ==
=== Iceland ===
In Iceland, the following format is used.

Format	Example	Explanation
Name; Street name + Number; Complements; Postal code + Place	Agnes Gísladóttir; Holtsflöt 4 íbúð 202 (flat 202); 300 Akranes	first name(s), last name (usually patronymic) street address in the nominative or dative case flat number etc. place: municipality, town or rural area

=== India ===
In India, one common format is used.

General Address

Format	Example
Name: Door–Street Number: {Or Flat No.–Block Code: (If Any), Apartment Name: (If Any)}, Road / Street / Avenue Name: , Locality: , Village / Town / City: , PIN: Country: INDIA; Mobile No.: +91 XXXXX XXXXX	Mr. Naveen Patnaik; 016-46N, Mango Tree Road, Aerodrome Area, Bhuvneshwar, 751 020; INDIA; Mobile No.: +91 99999 99999

- PIN stands for Postal Index Number.
- Mobile No. must contain the recipient's 10-digit contact number, excluding the country code +91.

=== Indonesia ===
In Indonesia, the address format is as follows:

Address Type	Format	Example
Residential with Street Names	Recipient's name Street name [Jl.] + Building number [No.] + Neighborhood/community association [RT./RW.] Village/subdistrict [Desa/Kel.], District [Kec.] City/regency [Kota/Kab.], Province [Prov.] (Optional) + Postal code	Budiman; Jl. Surya No. 10 RT.05/RW.02; Kel. Cempaka Putih, Kec. Cempaka Baru; Kota Jakarta Pusat 10640
Residential with Housing; Complex or Apartment	Recipient's name Housing complex/apartment + Building/room number [No.] + Neighborhood/community association [RT./RW.] (Optional); Village/subdistrict [Desa/Kel.], District [Kec.] City/regency [Kota/Kab.], Province [Prov.] (Optional) + Postal code	Hendro Agiman; Perumahan Citra Harmoni Cluster Green Valley Blok A No. 6 Kel. Karang Satria Kec. Tambun Selatan; Kab. Bekasi 17510
Business with Street Names	Recipient's name with salutation Name of position & department of recipient Company name Street name [Jl.] + Building number [No.] + Neighborhood/community association [RT./RW.] (Optional); Village/subdistrict [Desa/Kel.], District [Kec.] City/regency [Kota/Kab.], Province [Prov.] (Optional) + Postal code	Ibu Ani Wibowo; Kepala Departemen Personalia; PT Maju Jaya Abadi; Jl. Pahlawan Revolusi No. 28A; Kel. Cipete Utara, Kec. Kebayoran Baru; Kota Jakarta Selatan 12150
Business with PO Box	Recipient's name with salutation Name of position & department of recipient Company name "PO Box" + number and code of post office branch City/regency + Postal code	Bapak Heru Satyanto; Kepala Departemen Pemasaran; PT. Sejahtera Makmur; PO Box 1234 JKS; Jakarta 10001

Generally Jalan or Jl. means 'street' and should be written before the street name, e.g. Jalan Cemara. For more about Indonesian administrative divisions, see administrative divisions of Indonesia.

=== Iran ===
Postal addresses in Iran have a standard which should be used by mail or parcel senders. This standard is registered and qualified by the Universal Postal Union (UPU). According to the below table, Iran has 4 types of standard address:

Address Type	Format
Urban	Urban Locality; Street; Premise; Province; Postcode
Rural	Rural Locality; Street; Premise; Province; Postcode
PO Box	Locality; Province; PO Box
Post Restante	Restante; Locality; Province; Post Office

=== Iraq ===
In Iraq, the following format is used:

Format	Example
Name of Addressee; Name of the District; Mahla (Area) + Number; Zuqaq (Alley) + Number; Building number Name of Province; Postal code Country	Ali Hassan; Al-Mansour; Mahla 609; Zuqaq 8 House no. 12; Baghdad; 10013; Iraq

=== Ireland ===
In July 2015, the Republic of Ireland introduced Eircodes, a seven digit alphanumeric code, consisting of a 3 character routing key and a 4 character unique identifier for the property. Example A65 F4E2. Up until the introduction of Eircodes, Dublin was the only county with a form of postal district identifier; these have been incorporated into the Eircode scheme. For example, Dublin 2 is routing code D02.

Format	Example Dublin	Example outside Dublin
Addressee's Name; Number or name of house and street name/townland Post town + Postal district number (For Dublin addresses only); County name (where required); Eircode	The Shelbourne Hotel; 27 St Stephen's Green; Dublin; D02 H529	Lissadell House; Lissadell; Ballinfull; Co. Sligo; F91 ED70

Rural addresses are specified by the county, nearest post town, and the townland. Urban addresses are specified by county, city or town name, street name, house number, and apartment or flat number where relevant. A house name may be used instead of a number. The Eircode is appended to the bottom of the address.

=== Israel ===
In Israel, the Universal Postal Union recommends the following:

Format	Example
Name; Number + Street name Postal code + town	Yisrael Yisraeli; 16 Jaffa Street; 9414219 Tel Aviv

In apartment buildings the building number should appear first and then the apartment number separated by a "/". In the below example, "16" is the building number while "20" is the apartment number:

Format	Example
Name; Number + Street name Postal code + town	Yisrael Yisraeli; 16/20 Jaffa Street; 9414219 Tel Aviv

Example of common address with building entrance and apartment number:

Format	Example
Name number incl. entrance + Street name, + apartment Postal code + town	Yisrael Yisraeli; 1 B HaDoar, Apt. 20; 9414219 Tel Aiv

Or

Format	Example
Name number incl. entrance/apartment + Street name Postal code + town	Yisrael Yisraeli; 1B/20 HaDoar; 9414219 Tel Aviv, ISRAEL

A seven digit postal code for all addresses was introduced in 2013 which can cover an entire locality for a small town or village. In bigger cities postal areas are divided along streets and neighbourhoods.

=== Italy ===
A domestic address in Italy must be composed of three to five rows. Up to six rows can be used for international mail:

Format	Example
Addressee's name and surname or company name Optional – Additional information about the addressee If required – Additional information about the building (building number, floor, apartment number); Street name and number (via/viale/corso/piazza...); Postcode + Town + Province abbreviation Foreign State name	Claudio Verdi; Via Roma 35; 81055 Santa Maria Capua Vetere CE
Post Office Box Addresses
Recipient Name; Name of delivery post office Post office box number Postcode + Town + Province abbreviation	Claudio Verdi; Ufficio Roma Trullo; CASELLA POSTALE 14123; 00149 Roma RM

Line ordering may not be changed.

== J ==
=== Japan ===
Example in Japanese	Romanized, Japanese order	Format
(日本国) 〒112-0001 東京都文京区白山4丁目3番2号; 3階B号室 田中花子 様	(Nippon-koku) 〒112-0001; Tōkyō-to, Bunkyō-ku, Hakusan-4-chōme, 3-ban, 2-gō, 3-kai, B-gōshitsu; Tanaka Hanako sama	Country name (Japan); Postal code Address line (from larger to smaller division); Recipient
English, in Western order		
Ms. Hanako Tanaka; 3rd Fl. Rm. B 4-3-2 Hakusan; Bunkyō-ku, Tōkyō 112–0001 (Japan)		Recipient; Address line (secondary unit); Address line (sub-municipal level); Municipal, prefecture names and postal code Country name (Japan)

	Japanese	Romanized	Anglicized
Postal code	112–0001		
Prefecture-level division	東京都	Tōkyō-to	Tokyo (Prefecture)
Municipal-level subdivision	文京区	Bunkyō-ku	Bunkyo (Ward)
Land-lot number	白山4丁目3番2号	Hakusan-4-chōme 3-ban 2-gō	4-3-2 Hakusan (Neighborhood)
Secondary unit	3階B号室	3-kai B-gōshitsu	3rd Fl. Rm. B
Name of the recipient	田中花子 様	Tanaka Hanako sama	Ms. Hanako Tanaka

A Japanese postal address, when written in Japanese phonetic and Chinese characters, starts with the largest geographical division, continues with progressively smaller subdivisions before ending with the addressee, i.e. country, prefecture, town, chōme, banchi, building number, building name, floor number, company name, addressee. This is the most common addressing format used when mailing within Japan. It is common practice to add the appropriate honorific to the addressee's name, e.g. 様 for a private individual or 御中 for a company or institution.

When written in the Latin alphabet, the address begins with the smallest geographical area and ends with the largest one as in the Anglicized example in the table. Macrons (as on ō and ū) may be omitted.

Japanese-style envelopes are vertically aligned and the address is written from top to bottom, then right to left. Western-style envelopes are horizontally aligned and the address is written from left to right, top to bottom.

== L ==
=== Latvia ===
In Latvia, the address is generally formatted as follows:

Address Type	Format	Example
Rural Area	Addressee Name; Street Name, House Number, Flat Number or House Name; Village (if applicable); Parish (if applicable); Amalgamated Municipality; Postal Code	Andris Lapa; Liepu iela 1 Ērberģe; Mazzalves pag. Neretas nov. LV-5133
Urban Area	Addressee Name; Street Name, House Number, Flat Number; City or Town; Amalgamated Municipality (if applicable); Postal Code	Andris Lapa; Jelgavas iela 1–12; Aizpute; Aizputes nov. LV-3456

Notes:

- Each address element should be written on a separate line, starting with the more detailed element.
- Including the addressee's name is not mandatory and the address can be considered complete without it.
- In Latvian, the addressee's name should be provided in the dative case, i.e., Andrim Liepam. There are two generally accepted official salutation forms that can be used in front of the addressee's name: A.god. (with a man's name) or Ļ.cien. (with a man's or woman's name).
- Indicate the full street name, house and flat number (if applicable). Separate house and flat number with a hyphen.
- It is acceptable to abbreviate the parish (pag., abbreviation of pagasts) and amalgamated municipality (nov., abbreviation of novads).
- The postal code consists of two capital letters (LV) and four digits separated with a hyphen.
- For international mail the destination country must be indicated in block letters.

Further reference: Latvijas Pasts

== M ==
=== Macao ===
The official languages of Macao are Cantonese and Portuguese. For domestic mail within Macau, the address may be written entirely in either Portuguese or Chinese. For overseas mail going out from Macau, the address may be written in the language of the destination country, provided that the city name and the country name are in English. However, for overseas mail from Macau to mainland China, Hong Kong, Taiwan or Singapore, the address may be written entirely in Chinese. While traditional Chinese characters are commonly used in Macau, simplified Chinese characters are also understood by Macau's postmen. Note that Macau does not use any postal codes.

An address written in Portuguese should begin with the street name and end with the area in Macau, as in the following example for domestic mail within Macau.

Format	Example
Name of addressee Street name, Street number, Name of building, Floor number, Flat number, Península de Macau for Macau Peninsula/Taipa for Taipa/Coloane for Coloane/Cotai for Cotai	Sr. João Kuok; Rua de Macau, n.o 1, Edifício ABC, 2 andar, moradia C, Península de Macau

An address written in Chinese should begin with the largest unit and end with the smallest unit, as in the following example for a piece of domestic mail within Macau. Traditional Chinese characters are used in this example.

Format	Example
[澳門半島 for Macau Peninsula/氹仔 for Taipa/路環 for Coloane/路氹 for Cotai] [Street name][Street number] [Name of building][Floor number][Flat number] [Name of addressee]	澳門半島 澳門街1號; ABC大廈2樓C室 郭若昂先生

For mail to Macau from overseas, "Macau" should be added at the end of an address written in Portuguese, and "Macao" at the end of an address written in English; 澳門 should be added at the beginning of an address written in Chinese.

=== Malaysia ===
Pos Malaysia recommends the following formats:

Address Type	Format	Example
Residential	Salutation, Name of recipient Unit number, Street name Residential area Postcode Post office/Mail centre State (optional); Country	Mr. Zack Ahmad; 11 Jalan Budi 1 Taman Budiman; 42700 Banting; Selangor; Malaysia
Business	Salutation, Name of recipient Name of Position & Department (if applicable); Company name Unit/Lot number, Building name/Commercial area Lot number (for building), Street name Postcode Post office/Mail centre State (optional); Country	Dato' S.M. Nasrudin managing director Capital Shipping Bhd. Lot 323, 1st Floor, Bintang Commercial Centre; 29 Jalan Sekilau; 81300 Johor Bahru; Johor; Malaysia
Business + Post Office Box / Locked Bag / Counter Deposit Ticket	Salutation, Name of recipient Name of Position & Department (if applicable); Company name Unit/Lot number, Building name/Commercial area Lot number (for building), Street name Postcode, Post office/Mail centre P.O. Box number Postcode of P.O. Box, Post office/Mail centre of P.O. Box; Country	Ms. Jenny Chan; COO; Target Insurance Brokers; Level 2, Principal Towers; 11 Jalan Sultan Ismail; 50250 Kuala Lumpur; P.O. BOX 10073; 50704 Kuala Lumpur; Malaysia

Notes:

- The Country line MALAYSIA is always omitted when mailing from within Malaysia.
- The State line is strictly optional, the mailing system will not be affected if the State line is omitted.
- The Post office/Mail centre field is the name of the town/city which post office/mail centre jurisdiction covers the mailing address, and in several cases, may not be the actual town/city which the address is geographically located.
- It is recommended to have the Post office/Mail centre written in block letters, e.g. KUALA LUMPUR.
- The postcode is always in the 5-digit format and must correspond to the respective post office / mail centre.
- Pos Malaysia allows usage of P.O. Box for both residential and business addresses. Whenever a P.O. Box address is used, its respective postcode and post office/mail centre must be written on the last line of an address. If both postcodes are present (original and P.O. Box), mail will be sent to the P.O. Box on its first attempt.

=== Mexico ===
In Mexico, Correos de México recommends the following formats:

Address Type	Format	Example
Personal	Recipient's Name; Street Type and Name + Number; Settlement Type and Name; Postal Code + Locality (Optional), Municipality, Federal Entity	Alejandro Ramírez; C. Francisco I. Madero No. 115; Col. Nuevo Casas Grandes Centro; 31700 Nuevo Casas Grandes, Chih.
Business	Recipient's Name; Company Department or Position within Company (Optional); Company Name; Street Type and Name + Number; Settlement Type and Name; Postal Code + Locality (Optional), Municipality, Federal Entity	Ing. Juan Rodríguez Altamirano; Farmacéutica Altamirano; Av. Durango No. 264 Int. 1 Col. Primer Cuadro; 81200 Los Mochis, Ahome, Sin.
Apartado Postal, Lista de Correos or Poste Restante	Recipient's Name [Business] Company Department or Position within Company (Optional) [Business] Company Name; Delivery Method + [Apartado Postal] Number; Postal Administration; Post Office's Postal Code + Locality (Optional), Municipality, Federal Entity	Daniel González Ortiz; Apartado Postal A44; Administración Postal; Calvillo; 20801 Calvillo, Ags. Esteban Martínez Hernández; Lista de Correos; Administración Postal; Esperanza; 85211 Cajeme, Son. Esperanza Rodríguez Domínguez; Poste Restante; Administración Postal; Bermejillo; 35231 Mapimí, Dgo.

== N ==
=== Netherlands ===
In the Netherlands, the address is generally formatted as follows:

Format	Example
Name (Businesspark name etc.); Street + number or Postbus (P.O.Box number); Postal code + town Country – Optional	Jan Jansen Boschdijk 1092; 5627 BX EINDHOVEN; NETHERLANDS

The postal code is a unique street identifier, and always consists of four numbers followed by a space and then two capital letters. PostNL, which is appointed by the Dutch government to carry out the UPD (Dutch for Universal Postal Service), recommends putting two spaces between postal code and town. Also, the name of the town should be written in capitals.

Because the Dutch postal code uniquely identifies a street, a shortened format may also be used. This method only needs the postal code and the number. The ideal format for this method is the number after the postal code, meaning that this: '5627 BX 1092' will still get the letter delivered to the correct location.

It is also possible to replace the street name line with a PO box (e.g. "postbus 1200") or freepost number (e.g. "antwoordnummer 150"), which have their own postal code.

=== New Zealand ===
In New Zealand, New Zealand Post recommends the following format:

Format	Example
Recipient name Flat number/House number Street address or PO Box number Suburb or RD Number or PO Box lobby name (if not the same as the town/city); Town/City Postcode	Mr John Smith; 43 Vogel Street; Roslyn; Palmerston North 4414

Note that no space or full stops exists between P and O in PO Box or R and D in RD. One should put only one space between the town/city and the postcode.

Note for Wellington metropolitan area, users should use the city name (i.e. Wellington, Lower Hutt, Upper Hutt, Porirua), not the metropolitan area name. For example:

Incorrect	Correct	Correct
1 Molesworth Street; Taita; Wellington 5011	1 Molesworth Street; Taita; Lower Hutt 5011	1 Molesworth Street; Thorndon; Wellington 6011

The city in this case is important, as if Wellington is used instead of Lower Hutt and the postcode is unclear (note only the first digit differs), someone's private mail could accidentally be sent to the New Zealand Parliament Buildings instead (or vice versa).

One anomaly about this system is the Wellington Mail Centre, which is addressed as Wellington Mail Centre, Lower Hutt 5045, due to its location in the Lower Hutt suburb of Petone.

=== Norway ===
Postal addresses in Norway are formatted as follows:

Format	Example
Recipient (Person or Entity); Street Name + Number; Postal Code + Postal Town	Kari Normann; Storgata 81A; 6415 Molde

The first line, Recipient (Person or Entity), is the legal recipient of the item being sent. The Recipient's name must be marked on the Recipient's mail box for the item to be delivered.

Flat or floor number is not part of Norwegian postal addresses.

The postal code (always four digits) is mandatory. If a PO box is used (e.g. Postboks 250 Sentrum), it replaces Street name + Number. PO box addresses have postal codes which differ from those used for street addresses. Some areas do not have street names. For these areas, Street name + Number is replaced by a local designation determined by the Norwegian postal service.

== O ==
=== Oman ===
In the Sultanate of Oman (2012), the address is formatted as follows:

Format	Example
Name; Street number + house number Block number Area; City	Way 2259, 2919; Block 222; Murtafaat Al Qurm; Muscat

Physical addresses only exist in major urban centers like those of Greater Muscat, Sohar, Salalah, Sur and Nizwa.

== P ==
=== Pakistan ===
The format used in the Islamic Republic of Pakistan.

Official Addresses

Format	Example
Name; Street Number, Street Name; Union Council, Town; CITY NAME; District Name; Postal Code (PIN); Province	Muhammad Abdullah Umar; 15, M. A. Jinnah Road; Kharadar, Saddar; Karachi; Karachi District; 457700; Sindh

=== Peru ===
In Peru, addresses in the Metropolitan Area of Lima and Callao are generally formatted as follows:

Format	Example
Name; Street name, number Apartment (if needed); District; Postal code	Roberto Prada; Juan de Aliaga 230; Dpto 12; Magdalena del Mar; Lima 17

Addresses elsewhere in the country are formatted as follows:

Format	Example
Name; Street name, number Apartment (if needed); District; City (province)	Camilo Rada; Av. del Ejército 450; Dpto 5 Yanahuara; Arequipa

=== Philippines ===
The Philippines follows Western conventions on addressing. Addresses in the Philippines either uses these formats.

Origin	Destination	Format	Example
Within Metro Manila		Addressee; Street number Street name Barangay/Administrative district ZIP Code City (in capitals)	Mr. Juan Dela Cruz; 123 Rizal Ave., Santa Cruz; 1014 MANILA
Outside Metro Manila	To Metro Manila	Addressee; Street Number, Street Name; Barangay/Administrative district, City/Municipality; Postcode METRO MANILA	Mr. Juan Maliksi; 121 Epifanio Delos Santos Ave., Wack-wack Greenhills, Mandaluyong; 1550 METRO MANILA or Mr. Juan Dela Cruz; 123 Rizal Ave., Santa Cruz, Manila; 1014 METRO MANILA
Outside Metro Manila	To provinces	Addressee; Street number Street name Barangay/Administrative district, City/Municipality; Postcode Name of Province (in capitals)	Mr. Joel Magalang; 23 MacArthur Hwy., San Matias, Santo Tomas; 2020 PAMPANGA
Outside Metro Manila	To residential area (including purok/sitio)/subdivision	House number, Street name, Subdivision/Residential area Barangay/Administrative district, City/Municipality; Postcode Metro Manila/Province name (in capitals)	Ms. Joanna Dela Cruz; B11-L20 Genesis St., San Lorenzo South Subdivision; Malitlit, Santa Rosa; 4026 LAGUNA or Mr. Juan Galang; 10 Saint John St., Purok 7 San Nicolas 1st, Guagua; 2003 PAMPANGA

=== Poland ===
In Poland, the address is generally formatted as follows:

Format	Example	Example (PO box)
First name & surname of addressee and/or company name & department ul. Street name + house (building) number / flat number or al. Avenuename + house (building) number / flat number or pl. Squarename + house (building) number / flat number or Smalltown/Village name + house number Postal code + City or town Country name (optional)	Jan Kowalski ul. Wiejska 4/6 00-902 WARSZAWA; POLAND (POLSKA)	Jan Kowalski skrytka pocztowa nr 266; 60–700 POZNAŃ 2

ul. = Str (Street)
al. = Ave (Avenue)
pl. = Sq (Square, or Circus)

Some streets have names not containing the word "street". Then the full description is written with initial caps, e.g. "Zaułek Marii" (Court of Mary) or "Aleje Ujazdowskie" (plural for Ujazdowskie Ave.). If the first word of name is "Aleje" it may be abbreviated to "Al." (with initial capital).

The abbreviation "m." (meaning "mieszkanie" = "flat") can be used instead of "/" before the flat number.

Some large buildings occupy two or more cadastral plots. Sometimes to maintain consistency all numbers are included in address. The very well-known example is the address of Polish Radio Three: "ul. Myśliwiecka 3/5/7" (occupying three neighbouring plots). In examples like in above table the number "4/6" is ambiguous and not knowing the locality you cannot tell if "6" is the apartment number or the building is large.

When using a p.o. box the abbreviation "skr. poczt." may be used and "nr" (no.) may be omitted. Polish Post allows the box user to register an alias for their name. In such case it is written instead of the real name of the recipient. It is required to write the full name of post office including a number if it exists.

The postal code always consists of five digits separated with a hyphen (in the "XX-XXX" format), i.e. 00-486 (00 = Warsaw); 20-486 (20 = Lublin), etc. The first digit signifies the postal district, the second: the code zone, the third: the code sector, the fourth and fifth signify the post office and its area of operation. Usually the code is unique on the street level for cities and the town level for smaller towns and villages. Contrary to popular belief the name after postal code is a locality of addressee, not their post office. So if a small town has no street names you do write its name twice. The post office location (and a number if there are many) is written only on letters to p.o. box or poste restante.

There is a strong recommendation to use all caps in the line with postal code and city.

=== Portugal ===
Portuguese postal addresses is similar to continental European addresses:

Format	Example (manuscript)	Example (computer)	Example (PO Box)
Addressee; Street name + Street number + door Postal code + Town; Country	José Saramago; Rua da Liberdade, 34, 2º Esq. 4000-000 Porto; Portugal	José Saramago; Rua da Liberdade 34 2 Esq; 4000-000 Porto; Portugal	José Saramago; Apartado 1234; 4000-000 Porto; Portugal

Postal codes have the NNNN-NNN format. Street name and the number is traditionally separated by a comma, but nowadays CTT recommends just a blank space, or two blank spaces for extra clarity; this is to avoid OCR mistakes. The º after the number is the ordinal for floor number. Usually followed by "Esq." (Left, abbr from "Esquerdo") or "Dir." (Right, abbr from "Direito"), or an apartment letter (A, B, C, etc.). PO Boxes are called Apartado, followed by a number (e.g., Apartado 1001).

== Q ==
=== Qatar ===
In Qatar, Q-Post recommends the following format:

Format	Example
Name of addressee P.O. Box number Name of town Country	Mr. Ali Al-Matwi; P.O. Box 1714; Doha; Qatar

Not all of Qatar's roads and buildings are numbered, Q-Post doesn't deliver to any street addresses, and no postal codes are used in Qatar.

== R ==
=== Romania ===
In Romania, the address is generally formatted as follows:

Format	Examples	
Addressee and/or company name & department Street Type* + Street Name + nr. (street number) + Number bl. (building) + Building number + sc. (entrance) + Entrance number/letter et. (floor number) + Floor number + ap. (apartment number) + Number; City/village + jud. (county) / sector (for Bucharest) + County name/sector (for Bucharest) + Postal code Country name (optional)	Mihail Ionescu str. Pacienței, nr. 9 bl. U13A, sc. M et. 7, ap. 96; Victoria, jud. Brașov, 505722; România	Gheorghe Codreanu str. Virtuții, nr. 44; București, sector 6, 313988; România

- According to NACREP – National agency for cadastral and real estate publicity (in Romanian ANCPI – Agenția Națională de Cadastru și publicitate imobiliară) in Romania there are 29 street types such as:

No.	Street Type	Abbreviation	Example
1	Alee	Al.	Aleea Lungulețu (or Al. Lungulețu with abbreviation)
2	Bulevard	Bd.	Bulevardul Unirii (or Bd-ul Unirii with abbreviation)
3	Cale	–	–
4	Canal	–	–
5	Cartier	–	–
6	Colonie	–	–
7	Curte	–	–
8	Drum	–	–
9	Fundac	–	–
10	Fundatură	–	–
11	Hotar	–	–
12	Intrare	Intr.	Intrarea Albinelor (or Intr. Albinelor with abbreviation)
13	Parc	–	
14	Pasaj	–	–
15	Piață	–	–
16	Pietonal	–	–
17	Platou	–	–
18	Potecă	–	–
19	Prelungire	Prel.	Prelungirea Ferentari (or Prel. Ferentari with abbreviation)
20	Rampă	–	–
21	Scuar	–	–
22	Șir	–	–
23	Șosea	Șos.	Șoseaua Olteniței (or Șos. Olteniței with abbreviation)
24	Splai	Spl.	–
25	Stradă	Str.	Strada Lungă (or Str. Lungă with abbreviation)
26	Stradelă	–	–
27	Suiș	–	–
28	Trecere	–	–
29	Variantă	Var.	–

=== Russia ===
In Russia, the address must be written in Cyrillic or Latin alphabet, in usual format (from most specific to general).

Example:

Format	Cyrillic example	Latin example
Name of addressee Street name, number, apartment/room City/town/village; Raion (Sub-region); Oblast (region); Postal code Country	Гусев Иван Сергеевич ул. Победы, д. 20, кв. 29 пос. Октябрьский; Борский р-н Нижегородская обл. 606480; Россия	Gusev, Ivan Sergeyevich ul. Pobedy, d. 20, kv. 29 pos. Oktyabrskiy; Borskiy r-n Nizhegorodskaya obl. 606480; RUSSIA

Note: sub-region and region/oblast names are void if the city is Moscow or Saint Petersburg or if it is sub-region administrative center.

Some neighbourhoods may be planned in such a way that some, or most, apartment buildings face no named street. In this case, a number of expedients can be used. In older neighbourhoods, such as the historical center of Moscow, a "main" building may have the same number as one or more "subsidiary" buildings accessible via driveways behind the main building. They will be addressed as, for example, ul. Lenina, d. 123 (that is, 123 Lenin St). An address may also cover one or more subsidiary buildings behind the main building, addressed as ul. Lenina, d. 123, str. 2 (123 Lenin St, Unit 2, where str. (abbreviation for строение, stroyeniye) means a 'subsidiary building'). In newer areas with more regular street plans, apartment buildings that face no named street may be designated with Cyrillic letters appended to the building number, such as 123-а, 123-б, etc., in alphabetic order.

In some microraion neighbourhoods, with few, if any, buildings facing named streets, the name (or more likely number of the microraion (planned housing development)) would be used instead of the street name; thus someone may live at 4-th microrayon, d. 123, kv. 56, that is, 123 – 4th Microraion, apt. 56.

== S ==
=== Saudi Arabia ===
In Saudi Arabia, the address could be written in Arabic or English in the following format:

Format	Example
Addressee; Building Number + Street Name + Neighbourhood (if applicable); City + Postal code + Additional Numbers; Kingdom of Saudi Arabia	Mohammed Ali Al-Ahmed; 8228 Imam Ali Road – Alsalam Neighbourhood; Riyadh 12345-6789; Kingdom of Saudi Arabia

=== Serbia ===
Serbian postal addresses conform to rules similar to continental European rules:

Format	Example
Addressee; Street name + Number; Postal code + Town; Country (if other than Serbia)	Petar Petrović; Krunska 5; 11000 Beograd

In addition to 5-digit postal code, another line can be added containing PAK, a six-digit number which encodes the town, street and house number section.

=== Singapore ===
In Singapore, SingPost recommends the following format for addresses:

Format	Example
Name of addressee Street number and name Name of town + Postcode	Ms. Tan Bee Soo; 16 Sandilands Road; SINGAPORE 546080; SINGAPORE
Name of addressee Block number and street name Floor – Apartment number + Building name Name of town + Postcode	Mr. M. Rajendran; Blk 35 Mandalay Road # 13–37 Mandalay Towers; SINGAPORE 308215; SINGAPORE

Generally, the last line SINGAPORE is omitted when posting within the country. Addresses are usually written in the English language.

=== Slovakia ===
Common format in Slovakia:

Format	Example
Addressee (Name or Company); Company or Department or Landlord (if applicable); Street name + number Postal code + Town; COUNTRY (if sent abroad)	Jozef Vymyslený; Firma s.r.o. Nezábudková 3084/25; 84545 Bratislava; Slovensko

Postal codes are in the format "### ##" (i.e. 851 01 = Bratislava 5).

Street numbers can be written as orientation numbers (related to street) or descriptive numbers (unique within the town) or as a combination separated by a slash (descriptive/orientation). Descriptive numbers are also used within small villages that do not have named streets.

If the delivery is intended exclusively for a specific person at a company site, the address should begin with the individual's name and the company name should follow. The standard format of addresses enables anyone at the company to receive the delivery.

Slovenská pošta – Správne napísať adresu ("How to write addresses correctly", in Slovak, with pictures)

=== Slovenia ===
Slovenia uses a four-digit postal number. The first digit indicates the area:

- 1xxx for Ljubljana
- 2xxx for Maribor
- 3xxx for Celje
- 4xxx for Kranj
- 5xxx for Nova Gorica
- 6xxx for Koper
- 7xxx not used
- 8xxx for Novo Mesto
- 9xxx for Murska Sobota

The simpler the code, the bigger the locality: 1000 Ljubljana, 2000 Maribor (big cities); 1310 Ribnica, 9250 Gornja Radgona (mid-sized towns); 4263 Bohinjska Bela, 8262 Krška vas (smaller settlements, including villages).

Some cities have more than one post office, thus having multiple postcodes (usually in the x1xx format). For example, Ljubljana which has a "general" postcode 1000, also has additional ones, ranging from 1101 to 1133 (for some reason, however, omitting 1103 and 1105), Kamnik has 1240 and 1241, etc. Albeit they exist, it is not necessary to use them – usually the "general" postcodes are used.

Format	Example
Street address
Company name and/or Recipient's name Street (road, place, etc.) + number Postcode + Post town	Cvet, d. o. o. G. Janez Novak^{1} Slovenska cesta 64 A^{2},^{3} 2241 Spodnji Duplek
Locality address (places with unnamed streets)
Company name and/or Recipient's name Location (village, hamlet, etc.) + number Postcode + Post town	Juha, s. p. Ga. Angela Kovač; Pleterje 489^{2} 2324 Kidričevo
PO Box address (poštni predal)^{4}
Company name and/or Recipient's name p. p. + number Postcode + Post town	Vino, d. d. Gdč. Marija Repar p. p. 12; 1234 Mengeš
Special postcode holders^{5}
Company name Postcode + Post town	Nova Ljubljanska banka 1520 Ljubljana
Poste restante
Recipient's name POŠTNO LEŽEČE; Postcode + Post town	G. Peter Šilj; POŠTNO LEŽEČE; 4270 Jesenice

^1The abbreviations are: g. for gospod (Mr), ga. for gospa (Mrs), and gdč. for gospodična (Miss) – all always capitalized if in the beginning of the line.

^2Numbers can have a suffix like A, B, C, etc.

^3Common abbreviations are: c. for cesta (Street), and ul. for ulica (Road) – both always capitalised if in the beginning of the line.

^4 Bigger towns have special postcodes for PO Boxes in the xxx1 format, e.g. 1001 Ljubljana, 4001 Kranj.

^5 Big companies which receive large amounts of mail are designated their special postcodes in the x5xx format.

=== South Korea ===
Example in Korean	Romanized, in Korean order	Format
(대한민국) 서울특별시 종로구 사직로9길 23, 102동 304호 홍길동 귀하; 30174	(Daehan-minguk); Seoul-teukbyeolsi, Jongno-gu, Sajik-ro 9-gil 23, 102-dong 304-ho Hong Gil-dong gwiha 30174	Country name (South Korea); Address line (From larger to smaller division); Recipient; Postal code
English, in Western order	English, alternative	
Mr. Gil-dong Hong; Apt. 102–304; 23 Sajik-ro 9-gil Jongno-gu, Seoul 30174 (South Korea)	Mr. Gil-dong Hong; Bldg. 102 Unit 304; 23 Sajik-ro 9-gil Jongno-gu, Seoul 30174 (South Korea)	Recipient; Address line (secondary unit); Address line (street level); City, province names and postal code Country name (South Korea)

	Korean	Romanized	Anglicized
Provincial- or metropolitan-level division	서울특별시	Seoul-teukbyeolsi	Seoul (Special City)
County- or district-level subdivision	종로구	Jongno-gu	Jongno (District)
Street name and number	사직로9길 23	Sajik-ro 9-gil 23	23 Sajik-ro 9-gil (Road)
Secondary unit	102동 304호	102-dong 304-ho	Apt. 102–304 (or, Bldg. 102 Unit 304)
Name of the recipient	홍길동 (귀하)	Hong Gil-dong (gwiha)	(Mr.) Gil-dong Hong
Postal code	30174		

South Korea uses a system similar to Western addressing, but previously used a system similar to Japanese addressing. South Korean addresses start with the largest unit (country, province), as with other East Asian countries.

=== Spain ===
In Spain, the addresses are generally formatted as follows:

Format	Example
Recipient name Street type, name, number, storey and door Postal code and city Province	Sr. Francisco Ansó García; Paseo de la Castellana, 185, 5º B 29001 Madrid; Madrid

5ºB means 5th floor (Spanish: quinto), door B. Also, there may be door number, printed as 1ª (primera-first). Suffixes "o" and "a" derives from Spanish words piso (floor) which is masculine and puerta (door) which is feminine.

Format	Example
Recipient name Street type, name, number, storey and door Postal code and city Province	Dña. Antonia Fernandez Garcia; Av. de las Delicias, 14, 1º Dcha. 29001 Madrid; Madrid

Some doors may be indicated with the abbreviations Izq. or Dcha., to indicate either left (Izquierda) or right (Derecha). Streets and avenues can be indicated with the abbreviations C. (for calle) and Av. (for avenida).

=== Sri Lanka ===
Sri Lanka Post recommends the following format:

Format	Example
Name of addressee Street number and name Name of town Postcode; Country	Mr. A. L. Perera; 201 Silkhouse Street; KANDY; 20000; SRI LANKA

Sri Lanka uses a five-digit postal code. Generally, the last line SRI LANKA is omitted when posting within the country. Addresses are usually written in English and Sinhala.

=== Sweden ===
In Sweden, an address consists of a location address (belägenhetsadress), postal code and post town. The location address includes an address area (adressområde) and an address place (adressplats). The address area is either a street or village name, with the latter sometimes followed by a farm name. The address place is a number, possibly with a letter suffix. If multiple residences share a location address, each one has a four-digit apartment number, which is part of the address but is sometimes omitted. The following examples show how addresses are formatted:

Address Type	Format	Example
Urban	Addressee; Street name + number Postal code + Post town Country (if sent from abroad)	Anna Björklund; Storgatan 1; 112 01 Stockholm; SWEDEN
Urban with apartment number	Addressee; Street name + number lgh Apartment number Postal code + Post town Country (if sent from abroad)	Johan Persson; Koppargränd 2 lgh 1105; 331 51 Ösund; SWEDEN
Rural with farm name	Addressee; Village + farm name + number Postal code + Post town Country (if sent from abroad)	Sven Nilsson; Lillbyn Sörgården 2A; 345 67 Storbyn; SWEDEN
PO box	Addressee; Box number Postal code + Post town Country (if sent from abroad)	Postbolagen AB; Box 1121; 111 81 Stockholm; SWEDEN

The postal code is always a five-digit number divided into groups of three and two (e.g. SE-414 73) with the prefix SE (ISO-code for Sweden) used only if sent from abroad.

=== Switzerland ===
In Switzerland, the address is generally formatted as follows:

Format	Example (German)	Example (German with canton)	Example (French)	Example (French with canton)
Salutation; Recipient name Street name and number Postal code, city and (if needed) canton Country (if sent abroad)	Herrn; Rudolf Weber; Marktplatz 1; 4051 Basel; Switzerland	Frau; Claudia Weber; Solothurnerstrasse 28; 2544 Bettlach SO; Switzerland	Monsieur; Pierre Dupont; Rue Pépinet 10; 1003 Lausanne; Switzerland	Madame; Sophie Dupont; Rue du Marché 8; 1556 Cerniaz VD; Switzerland

The canton abbreviation (SO, VD in the examples) is needed only for cities/town that have the same name but in another canton for example: Renens and Renan which were both, in the past, called Renens, the difference stays today and Renens is often mentioned as Renens VD.

== T ==
=== Taiwan ===
In Taiwan, addresses are regulated by the Department of Household Registration, while mails are handled by the Chunghwa Post. As a result, senders are required to write addresses in different formats in different situations.

Address Type	Format	Example
Chinese-language domestic mail, vertical sender	County or City; Township, town, city or distinct Road or Street name Building number Sender Floor; Postal codes	台 北 市 市 府 路 王 ２ 小 號 明 ２ 緘 樓 １１０６０
Chinese-language domestic mail, vertical receiver	Postal codes Receiver County or City; Township, town, city or distinct Road or Street name Building number Floor	１１０６０ 王 台 小 北 明 市 收 市 府 路 ２ 號 ２ 樓
Chinese-language domestic mail, horizontal	Postal codes Address; Name or Company	11060 台北市信義區市府路2號2樓 王小明收
English-language international mail	Name or Company; Number, Alley, Lane, Road/Street Name; Township and District, County and City, Postal codes Country	Mr. Wang; 2F., No.2, Shifu Rd. Xinyi Dist., Taipei City 11060; Taiwan
Complete address for Department of Household Registration, Ministry of Interior	Number, Alley, Lane, Road/Street Name, Neighbourhood, Village, Township and District, County and City	2F., No.2, Shifu Rd., Neighbourhood 8, Xicun Vil., Xinyi Dist., Taipei City, Taiwan

=== Thailand ===
In Thailand, address are generally formatted as follows:

Format	Example
Name Surname; House (building) number / Flat number; Sub-District, District; Province; Postal code; Country	Mr. Siam Rakchart; 238/54 Phaithong Village; Bang Yai, Bang Yai; Nonthaburi; 11140; Thailand

=== Türkiye ===
Turkish addressing system is as follows:

Format	Example
Natural person Organisation and department or position (both optional); Neighbourhood or village Street name (if applicable) + Building name (if applicable) + Building number + Floor number (optional) + Flat number (if applicable); Postal code + Town (if applicable) + District (if applicable) + Province; Country (for international mail)	AHMET KORKMAZ ETİLER MAH. BADEM SOK. TOPRAK APT. NO:13 K:4 D:8; 34732 BEŞİKTAŞ / İSTANBUL; TURKEY

== U ==
=== Ukraine ===
Some neighbourhoods in Ukraine may be planned in such a way that some, or most, apartment buildings don't face a named street. In this case, a number of expedients can be used. In older neighbourhoods, a "main" building may have the same number as one or more "subsidiary" buildings accessible via driveways behind the main building. They will be addressed as vul. Bandery, d. 123 (123 Bandera St) An address may also cover one or more subsidiary buildings behind the main building, addressed as vul. Bandery, d. 123, bud. 2 (123 Bandera St, unit 2, where bud. (abbreviation for будинок, budynok) means a '(subsidiary) building'). In newer areas with more regular street plans, apartment buildings that don't face a named street may be designated with Cyrillic letters appended to the building number, e.g. 123-а, 123-б, etc., in Cyrillic alphabetical order.

In some microraion neighbourhoods, with few, if any, buildings facing named streets, the name (or more likely number of the microraion (planned housing development)) would be used instead of the street name; thus someone may live at 4-th microrayon, bud. 123, kv. 56, i.e. 123 – 4th Microraion, apt. 56.

Format	Cyrillic example	Latin example
Name of addressee Street name, number, apartment/room Village/city/town; Raion, Region; Postal code Country	Петренко Іван Леонідович вул. Шевченка, буд. 17 м. Біла Церква; Київська обл. 09117; Україна (UKRAINE)	Petrenko Ivan Leonidovych vul. Shevchenka, bud. 17 m. Bila Tserkva; Kyivs'ka obl. 09117; UKRAINE

=== United Arab Emirates ===
In the United Arab Emirates, Emirates Post Group recommends the following format:

Format	Example
Name of addressee P.O. Box number Name of the Emirate; Country	Mr. Ali Al-Matwi; P.O. Box 1714; Dubai; United Arab Emirates (UAE)

Not all of the roads and buildings in the UAE are numbered consistently and no postal codes are used in the United Arab Emirates. All mail by post are delivered only to PO boxes in the United Arab Emirates. If delivering to a street address it is customary to include recipient's telephone number should the delivery driver need to make a phone call to ascertain the address or let the recipient know that the package is already delivered.

=== United Kingdom ===
In the United Kingdom, the format specified by the postal operator Royal Mail is as follows:

Format	Example
Addressee's name Number supplement and street name Locality (only if required); Post town POSTCODE	Mr A Smith; 3a High Street; Hedge End; SOUTHAMPTON; SO31 4NG

The locality is required only where its absence would cause ambiguity, for example where a post town or postcode district includes two streets with the same name. Royal Mail specifies that post towns should be written in block capitals. Until 1996 a postal county (or permitted abbreviation) was required after the post town, unless it was a special post town, for example London. The post town and postcode should each be on a separate line. Historically, each line of an address ended with a comma and was indented from the previous line. Royal Mail discourage this usage and specify that all lines should start from the same point and not be staggered or aligned to the centre. The postcode identifies, from left to right, increasingly smaller units of the postal delivery system. The first half of the postcode, known as the outward code, contains the postcode area and postcode district. The second half, known as the inward code, contains the postcode sector and postcode unit.

=== United States ===
In the United States, addresses are generally formatted as follows:

Format	Example
Name of addressee House number and street name + Apartment/Suite/Room number (if any); Name of post office + State abbreviation + ZIP code (typical handwritten format)	Jeremy Martinson Jr. 455 Larkspur Dr. Apt 23; Baviera, CA 92908
Name of addressee House number and street name +Apartment/Suite/Room number if any Name of post office + State abbreviation + ZIP+4 code (USPS-recommended format)	JEREMY MARTINSON JR; 455 LARKSPUR DR APT 23; BAVIERA CA 92908‑4601

The street address line can take a number of alternate formats:

- "GENERAL DELIVERY" marks the item to be held for pickup from the post office (see General delivery § United States)
- Some street names are simply the names of highways, like "KY STATE HIGHWAY 625" (a Kentucky state highway), "INTERSTATE 55 BYP" (an auxiliary Interstate bypass), "FM 1200" (a "farm to market" road) or "LOOP 410".
- In rural areas, mail is addressed according to the mail route rather than the physical street address. The street address line might be something like "RR 9 BOX 19-1A" (a "rural route", previously RFD or RD "rural delivery") "HC 68 BOX 23A" for "highway contract" routes (formerly "star routes") The physical street address may appear in the line above the "RR" line without hindering delivery. Since the nineties, the trend has been to replace rural-route addresses with conventional street addresses to aid 9-1-1 dispatchers. The new address is found using the USPS Locatable Address Conversion System.
- In Hawaii and Southern California, some addresses have a hyphen in the street number, which should not be removed if matched to the ZIP+4 file. Almost all addresses in the New York City borough of Queens have hyphens, for example "123–45 QUEENS BLVD".
- In Utah, some addresses are given in a grid style, where the "street name" consists of a cardinal direction, a number that is a multiple of 100, and an orthogonal cardinal direction. For example, "401 West 500 North" is on the grid in St. George, Utah, on the road West 500 North between its intersections with North 400 West and North 500 West.
- In Wisconsin and northern Illinois, grid addresses are sometimes written as a sequence of numbers and directional letters, e.g. "N6W23001 BLUEMOUND RD".
- In Puerto Rico, street addresses often include an urbanization or condominium name. The USPS allows for Spanish conventions on the island.
- United States Virgin Islands street addresses sometimes include only an estate name or a street name with no number, and many street names do not have common suffixes like "Street" or "Road".

Notes:

- Traditionally, only the United States Postal Service (USPS) has been permitted to deliver to a P.O. Box. For this reason the recipient may choose to insert their physical (aka street) address in the second line, expanding the complete address to four lines. Providing both allows a sender to ship via the USPS or via a private carrier. Some USPS facilities allow a user of a P.O. box to use the street address of the postal facility with the P.O. box number in the place of a suite number, in which case the user may receive packages from private carriers.
- Mail will be delivered to the line immediately above the city, state, ZIP code line.
- The state and type of street, e.g. Lane, is often abbreviated as shown in the PO standard.
- The USPS discourages the use of all punctuation except the hyphen in ZIP+4 codes, slashes in fractional addresses (e.g. 123 1/2 Main Street), hyphenated street numbers, and periods in decimal addresses (e.g. the street name contains a decimal point). Hyphenated street numbers are common in the New York City borough of Queens, Hawaii, and Southern California; as well as the town of Fair Lawn, New Jersey; see house numbering.
- Sometimes the name of the town required by the United States Postal Service does not necessarily mean that address is within that city. See also ZIP codes and previous zoning lines. The reason is that the USPS establishes ZIP Codes to maximize the efficiency of its system, not to recognize jurisdictional boundaries.
- In some other cases, the boundaries of towns as recognized by the U.S. Postal Service are much smaller than the area within the city limits. For one example, mail to much of the city of Los Angeles cannot be addressed to "Los Angeles".
- The U.S. Postal Service does not recognize "New York City" as a valid postal address. "New York" is a valid postal address only for Manhattan; mail to the city's other boroughs must be addressed with the borough name or, in Queens, with the neighborhood name associated with the recipient's ZIP Code.
- The USPS prefers that territories be addressed in the standard domestic format (e.g. "San Juan PR 00907") but in practice territory names are sometimes written as if they are a country (e.g. "San Juan 00907 Puerto Rico").
- International United States Department of State mail will use "DPO" as the city; military mail will use "APO" or "FPO". Both use "AE", "AP", or "AA" in place of the state code, depending on the continent.
- Three independent countries with a Compact of Free Association with the U.S. (Palau, the Marshall Islands, and the Federated States of Micronesia) have their own domestic government-run mail services, but are integrated into the USPS addressing and ZIP code system. (See United States Postal Service#International services.)

== V ==
=== Vietnam ===
In Vietnam, addresses are generally formatted as follows:

Format	Vietnamese example	English example
Name of addressee House number and street name Commune, ward or special zone Province or city Country (if sent from abroad)	Lê Văn Bình, số 60 phố Bà Triệu, phường Cửa Nam, thành phố Hà Nội	Mr Le Van Binh number 60 Ba Trieu street, Cua Nam ward, Hanoi city, Vietnam
