= LAC =

LAC may refer to:

== Places ==
- La Crescenta, California, unincorporated area in Los Angeles County
- Latin America and the Caribbean
- Latin American and Caribbean Group, United Nations geoscheme region
- Line of Actual Control, a demarcation line between Indian-controlled and Chinese-controlled territories (1959–present)
- Los Angeles County in California
- Los Angeles, California

== Education ==
- Liberal arts college, undergraduate educational institution
- Longburn Adventist College, a Seventh-day Adventist school near Palmerston North, in Longburn, New Zealand

== Government and military ==
- California State Prison, Los Angeles County
- Leading Aircraftman, a rank in some air forces

== Organizations ==
- LAC Group, library services vendor in America
- LAC Minerals, a Canadian mining company
- Ladies' Alpine Club (1907–1975), a club for women climbers, based in London, merged in 1975 with the Alpine Club
- Lake Avenue Church, Pasadena Ca.
- Lancashire Aero Club, flying club in the United Kingdom
- Legal Aid Commission, organisation providing legal aid related to Community legal centres, Australia
- Library and Archives Canada, national memory institution preserving documentary heritage about Canadian life
- Liga Antituberculosa Colombiana, an organization focused on curing and preventing tuberculosis
- Living Asia Channel, a Philippine pay television channel

== Science and technology ==
- L2TP Access Concentrator, endpoint of a Layer 2 Tunneling Protocol tunnel
- Laboratoire Aimé-Cotton, French research laboratory
- Linear acetylenic carbon, a polymeric carbon chain
- Location area code, a unique 16-digit fixed length location area identity code broadcast by a "base transceiver station" in GSM public land mobile network, that identifies a phone number's location area
- Lorenz asymmetry coefficient, a statistic used in the analysis of wealth or income inequality
- lac operon, a DNA operon relating to the metabolism of lactose found in some bacteria

== Sports ==
- London Aquatics Centre
- Los Angeles Chargers, a National Football League team based in Inglewood, California
- Los Angeles Clippers, a National Basketball Association team based in Inglewood, California
- London Athletic Club, oldest independent athletic club in the world

== Transport ==
- LAC, the ICAO operator designator for Lockheed Corporation (Lockheed Aircraft Corporation), United States
- LAC, the station code for Lancing railway station in West Sussex, England
- LAC Colombia, a former airline in Colombia (1974–1996)
- Granada LAC, a bus rapid transit system in the city of Granada, Spain
- Lignes Aériennes Congolaises, a former airline of the Democratic Republic of the Congo (2005–2013)
- Linea Aerea Cuencana, a regional airline operating out of Cuenca, Ecuador
- Líneas Aéreas Canarias, a former airline of the Canary Islands, Spain (1985–1990)

== See also ==
- Lanthanum carbide (LaC2)
- Lac (disambiguation)
- LACS (disambiguation)
- LACC (disambiguation)
- L.A.C. Battle of Galwan, a 2025 Indian film about the 2020 skirmish at the Line of Actual Control
