= Lak Lak =

Lak Lak or Laklak may refer to:

- Lak Lak, Hamadan, a village in Hamadan Province, western Iran
- Lak Lak Ashian, a village in Razavi Khorasan Province, northeastern Iran
- Lak Lag, or Lak Lak, a village in Razavi Khorasan Province, northeastern Iran
- Laklak (food), a Balinese traditional pancake
- Lak-lak, Armenian magazine
- Likak, or Lak Lak, a city in Boyer-Ahmad Province, southwestern Iran

== See also ==
- Lak (disambiguation)
