= Lak people =

Lak people may refer to:

- Laks (Caucasus), an ethnic group of Dagestan, North Caucasus, Russia
- Laks (Iran), an ethnic group of southwestern Iran

== See also ==
- Laks (disambiguation)
