= Battle of Galwan =

Battle of Galwan may refer to:

- Various conflicts between China and India in the Galwan River Valley
  - Battle of Galwan (1962), during the 1962 Sino-Indian War
  - Battle of Galwan (2020), during the 2020–2021 China–India skirmishes
- L.A.C. Battle of Galwan, 2025 Indian film directed by Nitin Kumar Gupta about the 2020 skirmish
- Maatrubhumi: May War Rest in Peace, working title Battle of Galwan, 2026 Indian film directed by Apoorva Lakhia about the 2020 skirmish
