= Lack =

Lack may refer to:

== Places ==
- Lack, County Fermanagh, a townland in Northern Ireland
- Lack, Poland
- Łąck, Poland
- Lack Township, Juniata County, Pennsylvania, US

== Other uses ==
- Lack (surname)
- Lack (manque), a term in Lacan's psychoanalytic philosophy
- "Lack" (song), by Porno Graffiti, 2003
- IKEA Lack, a table manufactured by IKEA

== See also ==
- Lakh, a term in India for 100,000
- Lac (disambiguation)
- Lak (disambiguation)
- Henrietta Lacks (1920–1951), African-American woman whose cancer cells are the source of the immortalized HeLa cell line
- 359426 Lacks, a main-belt asteroid named after Henrietta Lacks
