= Lax =

A lax is a salmon. LAX as an acronym most commonly refers to Los Angeles International Airport in Southern California, United States.

LAX or Lax may also refer to:

== Places ==
=== Within Los Angeles ===
- Los Angeles Union Station, Los Angeles' main train depot, whose Amtrak station code is "LAX"
- The Port of Los Angeles, whose port identifier code is "LAX"

=== Other ===
- Lax, Switzerland, a municipality of the canton of Valais
- Lax Lake (disambiguation)
- La Crosse, Wisconsin, a city on the Mississippi River

== Sports ==
- Los Angeles Xtreme, a former American football team
- Lacrosse, a sport
- The Latin American Xchange, a professional wrestling stable

== Media and entertainment ==
- LAX (album), the third studio album from rapper The Game
- LAX (TV series), a 2004–05 television series set in Los Angeles International Airport
- "LA X", the two-part sixth season 2010 premiere of the television show Lost
- LAX, a night club at Luxor Las Vegas
- "LAX", a song by the rapper Xzibit from Weapons of Mass Destruction
- "LAX", a song by Snoop Dogg featuring Ice Cube from Tha Blue Carpet Treatment
- "LAX", a song by Big D and the Kids Table on their album How It Goes
- "LAX", a song by Jake Owen from American Love
- "LAX", a song by Hawk Nelson from Crazy Love
- L.A.X., a disco studio act who released two albums on Prelude Records

== Science and linguistics ==
- Laxative, a concoction that loosens the bowels
- Lax pair, a pair of matrices that solve a type of differential equation, named after Peter Lax
- lax functors in higher category theory
- A lax vowel, one that lacks the quality of tenseness

== People ==
- Anneli Cahn Lax (1922–1999), American mathematician
- Benjamin Lax (1915–2015), American physicist
- Gaspar Lax (1487–1560), Spanish mathematician, logician, and philosopher
- Henrik Lax (born 1946), Finnish politician
- John Lax (1911–2001), American ice hockey player
- Peter Lax (1926–2025), Hungarian-American mathematician
- Peter Lax (ice hockey) (born 1941), German ice hockey player
- Rick Lax (born 1982), American entertainer
- L.A.X (musician) (born 1993), Nigerian recording artist Damilola Afolabi

== See also ==
- Laks (disambiguation)
- Lacs (disambiguation)
- Laax, a municipality in the district of Surselva in the Swiss canton of Graubünden
- Gravlax, a Nordic salmon dish
