= Lak =

Lak may refer to:

== People ==
- Laks (Caucasus), an ethnic group of Dagestan, North Caucasus, Russia
- Lak (tribe), a Kurdish tribe in Iran and Turkey.
- Laks (Nuer), a Nuer tribe in South Sudan
- Hamed Lak (born 1990), Iranian football goalkeeper
- Peter Lak (born 1973), American retired soccer defender

== Places ==
- Lak, Dak Lak, Vietnam
- L'ak, a commune in Cambodia
- Lak, Hungary, a village
- Lak, Iran (disambiguation), various places
- Lək (disambiguation), places in Azerbaijan

== Languages ==
- Lak language
- ISO 639-3 code for the Laka language (Nigeria)

== Sports ==
- Los Angeles Kings, an ice hockey team based in Los Angeles, California

== LAK ==
- Lao kip, ISO 4217 currency code
- Lymphokine-activated killer cell
- Aklavik/Freddie Carmichael Airport, Northwest Territories, Canada, IATA code
- Lakeland (Amtrak station), Florida, US, station code
- Lakenheath railway station, Suffolk, England, station code
- Lai King station, New Territories, Hong Kong, MTR station code
- Liste der archaischen Keilschriftzeichen (1922), a dictionary of cuneiform signs
- Lietuviškos Aviacinės Konstrukcijos, Lithuanian/Soviet gliders, LAK-2, etc.
- Lycée Abdel Kader, a French international school in Beirut

== See also ==
- Lakh, a unit in the Indian numbering system
- Lak Mueang, a Thai city pillar
- Lac (disambiguation)
- Lack (disambiguation)
- Laak (disambiguation)
- Lak Lak (disambiguation)
- Laks (disambiguation)
