= Laack =

Laack is a surname. Notable people with the surname include:

- Charles A. Laack (1871–1957), American businessman and politician
- Galen Laack (1931–1958), American football player

== See also ==
- Hotel Laack, NRHP-listed building in Plymouth, Wisconsin named for H.C. Laack
- Lack (surname)
