= Laak =

Laak can refer to:

== People ==
=== Laak ===
- Aleksander Laak (1907–1960), lieutenant and the commander of the Jägala concentration camp during the German occupation
- Dan Laak, American head dive coach
- Phil Laak (born 1972), Irish-American poker player

=== Ter Laak ===
- Everard Ter Laak (1868-1931), Dutch Roman Catholic missionary and bishop in China
- Ine ter Laak-Spijk (1931–2002), Dutch short and middle-distance runner

=== Van de Laak ===
- Koen van de Laak (born 1982), Dutch footballer

=== Van Laak ===
- Claudia van Laak (born 1963), German radio journalist

== Places ==
- Laak, Davao de Oro, Philippines
- Laak, The Hague, Netherlands
- Laak River, Rotselaar, Belgium
- Laak (Königsberg) formerly Germany, presently part of Kaliningrad, Russia

== See also ==
- LAK (disambiguation) / Lak
