= Laksha =

Laksha (Sanskrit: लक्ष) means hundred thousand or a lakh.

- Laksha Gala Sankeertanarchana, a Guinness record-breaking mass singing event held at Hyderabad
- Lakshadhikari, a 1963 Indian Telugu-language drama film
- Lakshadweep, the smallest union territory of India

== See also ==
- Laks (disambiguation)
- Laksa (disambiguation)
- Laksh Lalwani, an Indian actor
