= Lax Lake =

Lax Lake may refer to:

- Lax Lake, Minnesota, an unincorporated community
- Lax Lake (Minnesota), a lake in Minnesota
