= Lax Lake, Minnesota =

Unincorporated community in Minnesota, United States

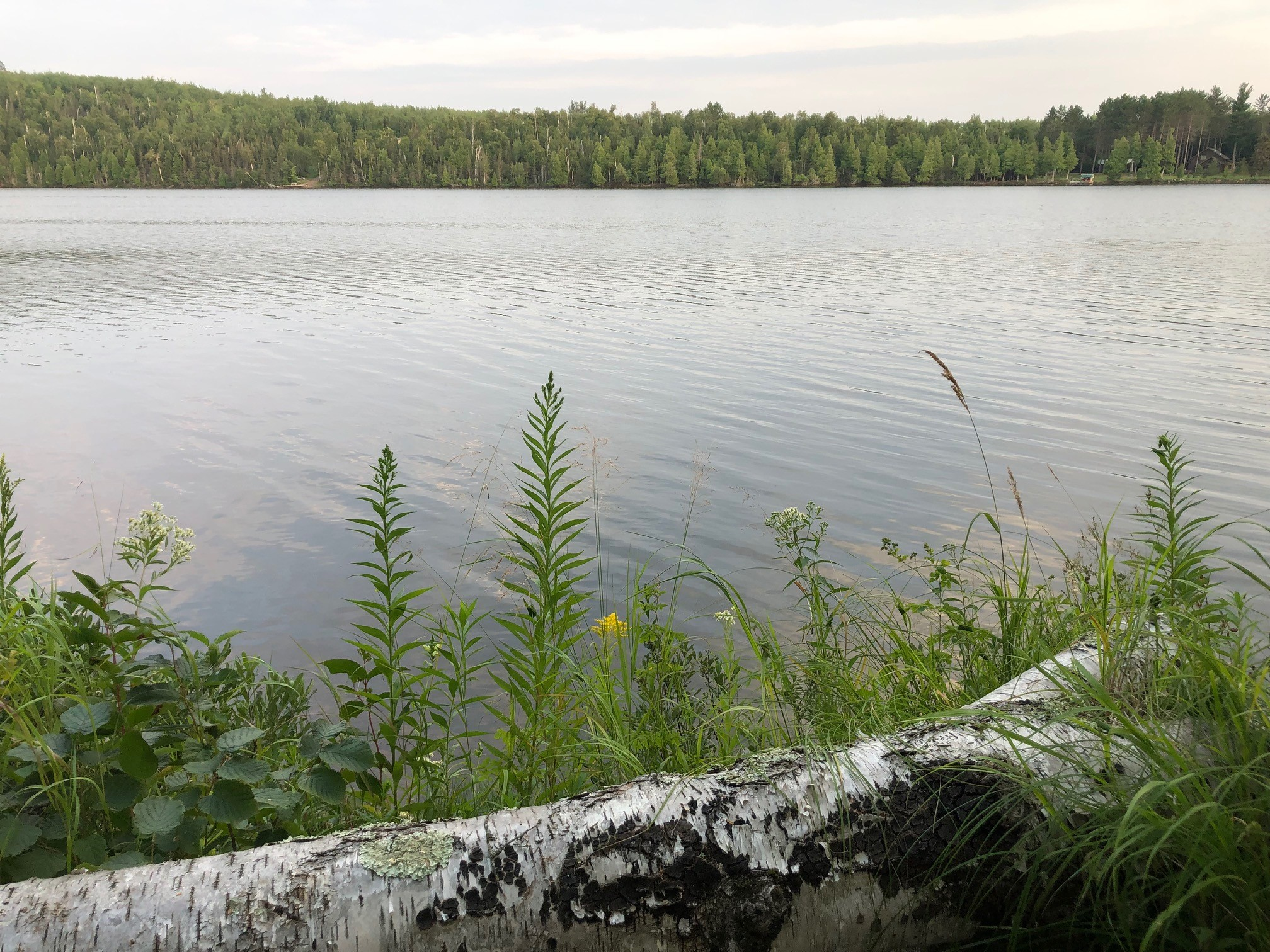
- Unincorporated community View of Lax Lake from the shore.

- Location within Minnesota Location within the United States
- Coordinates: 47°20′39″N 91°18′32″W
- Country: United States
- State: Minnesota
- County: Lake
- Township: Beaver Bay
- Elevation: 1,283 ft (391 m)

Population
  - Total: 20
- Time zone: UTC-6 (Central (CST))
  - Summer (DST): UTC-5 (CDT)
- ZIP code: 55614
- Area code: 218
- GNIS feature ID: 656969

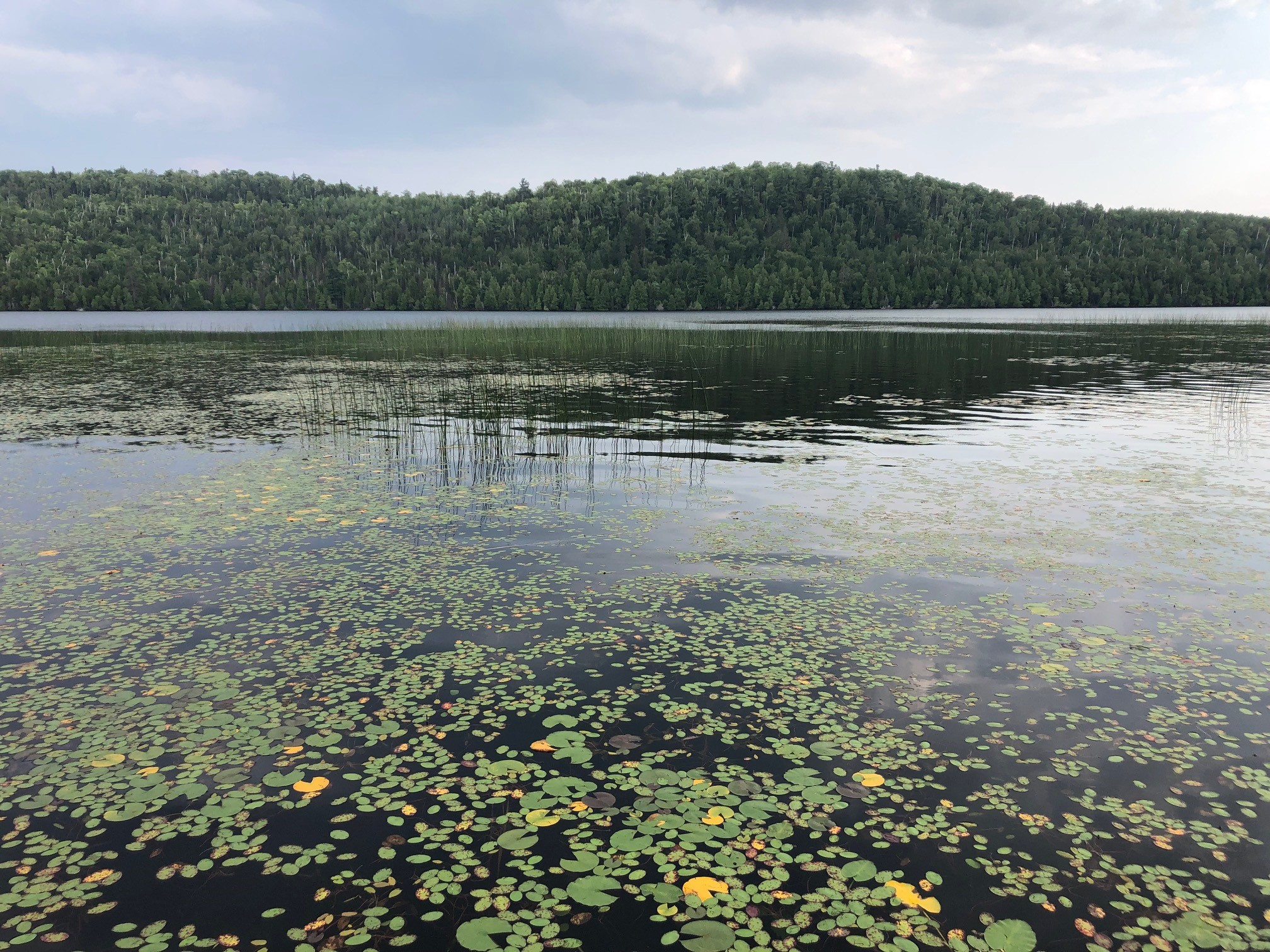
Lax lake with lily pads in foreground.

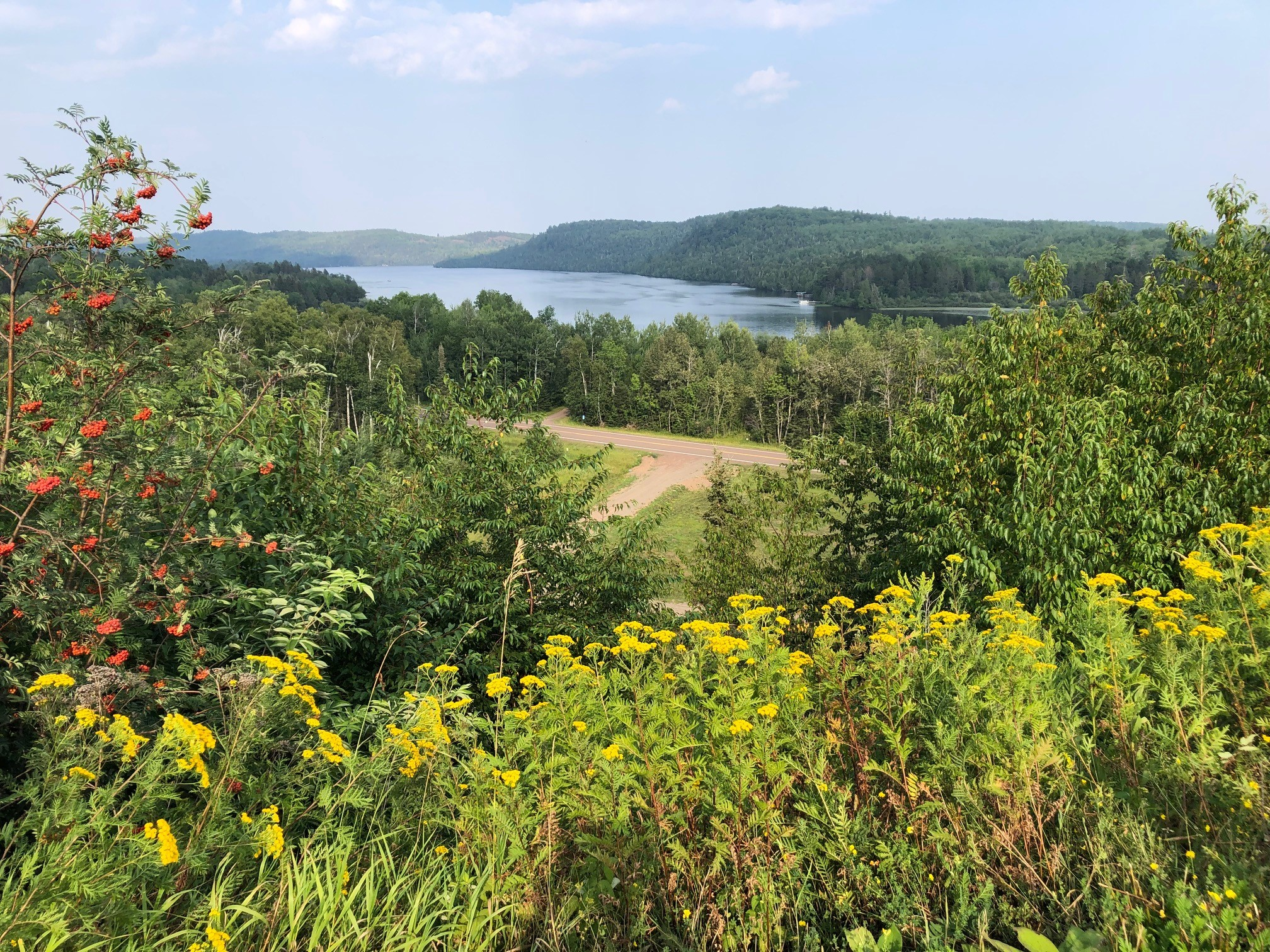
Lax Lake view from hill.

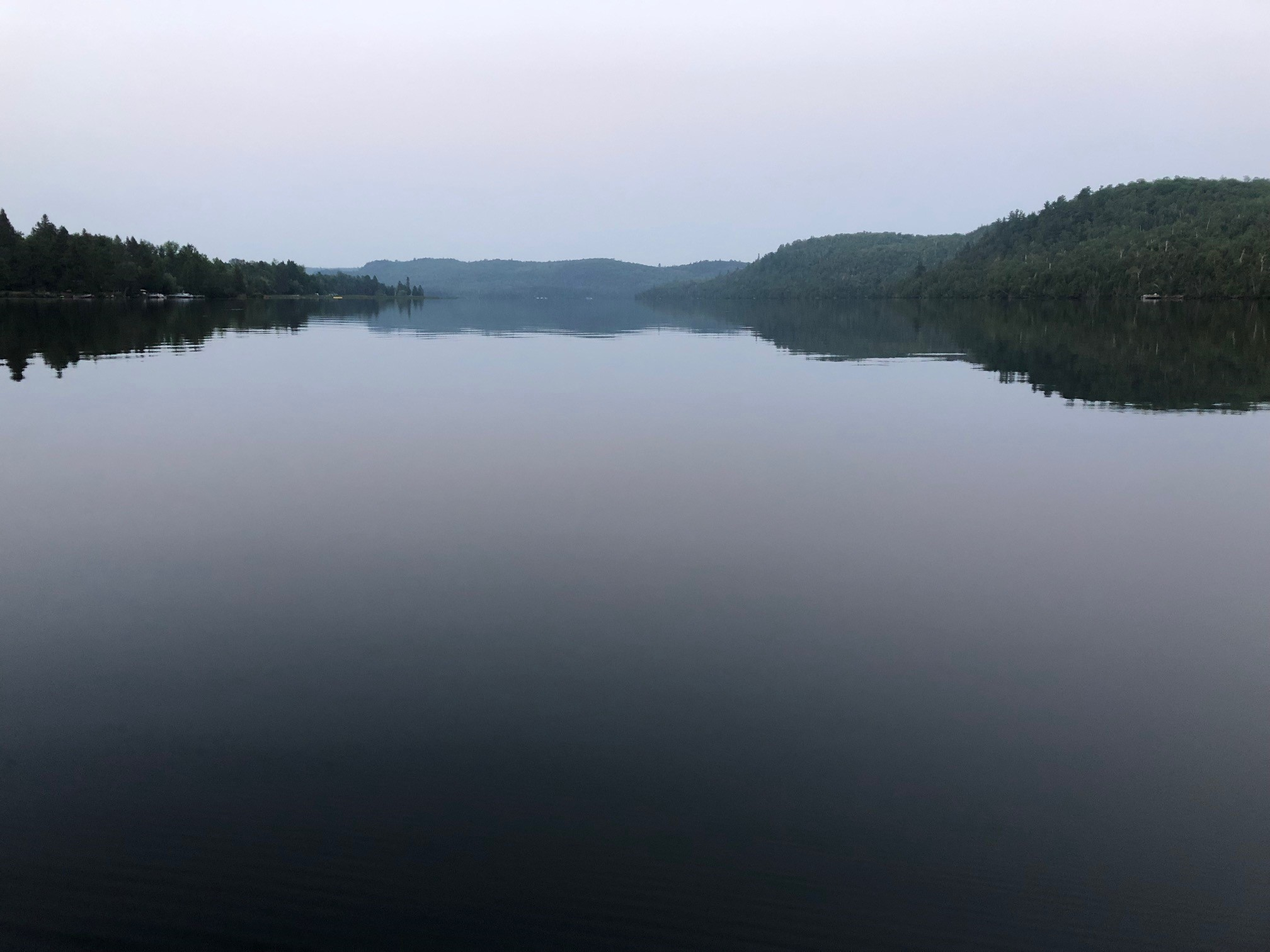
Lax Lake at dusk.

Lax Lake is an unincorporated community in Beaver Bay Township, Lake County, Minnesota, United States. The community is located north of Beaver Bay and Silver Bay on Lax Lake Road (Lake County Road 31/Lake County Road 4).

Lax Lake is located 32 miles northeast of the city of Two Harbors. Some nearby excursions are Tettegouche State Park, the Baptism River, Split Rock Lighthouse and Gooseberry Falls State Park.

Lax Lake is 295 acres with 3.01 miles of shoreline, although most is privately owned. The deepest areas of the lake are 35 feet deep and walleye, pike, bass, crappies, bluegills and yellow perch can all be found in Lax Lake. One side of the shoreline is mostly undeveloped and back up to Tettegouche State Park. There is a public access concrete boat ramp with a dock and small parking area at the northeast shore of the lake.

== History ==
Lax lake was named after the Waxlax family who arrived in Northern Minnesota in 1894 from Sweden. Johannas Waxlax built the first homestead on Lax Lake and community developed in about 1907 when the Alger-Smith Lumber Company's Duluth and Northern Minnesota Railroad reached the area. Johannas Waxlax died in a train accident in 1910. A post office called Lax Lake was established in 1913, and remained in operation until 1915. The community was named for nearby Lax Lake. After the logging was completed, the community became largely residential and in 1928 John Waxlax built a resort area known as Lax Lake Resort.
