= LACC =

LACC may refer to:

== Los Angeles ==
- Los Angeles Children's Chorus, a community children's choir for girls and boys with unchanged voices from the Los Angeles area ranging from ages 8 to 17
- Los Angeles City College, a public community college in the East Hollywood neighborhood of Los Angeles, California
- Los Angeles Common Council, the predecessor of the Los Angeles City Council
- Los Angeles Country Club
- Los Angeles College of Chiropractic, a chiropractic school in Los Angeles
- Los Angeles Convention Center, a convention center in downtown Los Angeles
- L.A. Comic Con, the Comic-Con franchise in Los Angeles
- Los Angeles Consular Corps, the association of nations' consulates in Los Angeles

== Other uses ==
- London Area Control Centre
- Lidcombe Auburn Cycling Club, a cycling club based in the inner Western area of Sydney, Australia.
- Lake Avenue Congregational Church, commonly known and branded as Lake Avenue Church, Pasadena, Ca., USA

== See also ==
- LACC1, gene and protein concerning laccase
- Lanthanum carbide (LaC2)
- LAC (disambiguation)
