= Laksa (disambiguation) =

Laksa is a spicy noodle soup popular in the Peranakan cuisine of Southeast Asia. Katong Laksa is a variant of laksa lemak inspired by the Straits Chinese who live in the precinct of Katong in Singapore. The herb Persicaria odorata is sometimes known as "laksa leaf", for its use in some variations of the noodle soup.

Laksa or the accented Ļaksa or Lakså may also refer to:

== Laksa ==
- Kitija Laksa (born 1996), Latvian basketball player
- Mārtiņš Laksa (born 1990), Latvian basketball player

== Ļaksa ==
- Māris Ļaksa (born 1981), Latvian basketball player

== Lakså ==
- Lakså, Evenes, a village in the municipality of Evenes in Nordland county, Norway
- Lakså, Fauske, an abandoned village in the municipality of Fauske in Nordland county, Norway

== See also ==
- Laksha (disambiguation)
- Laks (disambiguation)
- Lakshadweep, a union territory of India
