= Le Lac =

Le lac (French "the lake") may refer to:

== Geography ==
- Le Lac, Morteau
- Le Lac, on the Via Domitia of Aimery II of Narbonne
- Le Lac (fr), Memramcook Canada
- Le Lac-d'Issarlès, a commune in the Ardèche department in southern France

=== -le-Lac ===
- Aiguebelette-le-Lac, a commune in the Savoie department in the Auvergne-Rhône-Alpes region in south-eastern France
- Estavayer-le-Lac, a former municipality of the canton of Fribourg, situated on the south shore of Lake Neuchâtel
- Ferrières-le-Lac, a commune in the Doubs department in the Bourgogne-Franche-Comté region in eastern France
- Ivry-sur-le-Lac, Quebec, a village and municipality in the Laurentides region of Quebec, Canada, part of the Les Laurentides Regional County Municipality
- Laval-sur-le-Lac, a small sector on the western part of Laval and was a separate city until the municipal mergers on August 6, 1965
- Lépin-le-Lac, a commune in the Savoie department in the Auvergne-Rhône-Alpes region in south-eastern France
- Putanges-le-Lac, a commune in the department of Orne, northwestern France
- Savines-le-Lac, a commune in the Hautes-Alpes department in southeastern France
- Villegusien-le-Lac, a commune in the Haute-Marne department in north-eastern France
- Villers-le-Lac, a commune in the Doubs department in the Bourgogne-Franche-Comté region in eastern France

=== -les-Lacs ===
- Clairvaux-les-Lacs, a commune in the Jura department in Franche-Comté in eastern France
- Jugon-les-Lacs, a commune in the Côtes-d'Armor department of Brittany in northwestern France
- Jugon-les-Lacs, a delegated commune in the Côtes-d'Armor department of Brittany in northwestern France

=== -sur-le-Lac ===
- Fossambault-sur-le-Lac is a French-speaking city in the south part of Quebec, Canada, in La Jacques-Cartier Regional County Municipality
- Sainte-Marthe-sur-le-Lac, Quebec, an off-island suburb of Montreal, in the Canadian province of Quebec, located in the Deux-Montagnes Regional County Municipality
- Témiscouata-sur-le-Lac, a municipality in Quebec, Canada
- Vaudreuil-sur-le-Lac, a village municipality in Vaudreuil-Soulanges Regional County Municipality in the Montérégie region of Quebec, Canada

== Poetry and music ==
- "Le Lac" (poem), Alphonse de Lamartine 1820
- "Le Lac" (fr), single by the French band Indochine from their 2009 album La République des Meteors
- "Le lac" (song) by Julien Doré 2016

== See also ==
- Lac (disambiguation)
