= Granada urban buses =

The city buses of Granada is a public transport system from the city of Granada (Spain), operated by the companies Transportes Rober, Alhambra Bus and Herederos de Gómez. Granada is one of the Spanish cities where the bus is most used, with 160 trips per inhabitant every year.

== History ==
The first public transport route in Granada was a tram connecting Paseo de la Bomba with Plaza Nueva, inaugurated 7 July 1904 operated by Tranvías Eléctricos de Granada (Electric Trams of Granada). Until the 1960s, when trams were gradually substituted by buses, the company operated 90 kilometers of tramways.

In 1962, the Madridian bus company Transportes Rober, founded in 1957, won the competition to operate the bus line system in Granada. The concession has been constantly renovated up until 2020, but the city council can rescue the service by paying a compensation.

During the 1990s, Transportes Rober created an affiliate company, Alhambra Bus, to operate the lines which went through the Alhambra, Albayzin, Sacromonte and Realejo districts. Alhambra Bus uses minibuses due to the narrowness of the streets. Also, a new line was created which went to the nearby town of Cenes de la Vega, operated by a separate company, Herederos de Gómez.

In 2002, the Metropolitan Transport Consortium of the Granada Area was created, and the urban bus network was integrated within it.

== Fleet ==
The Transportes Rober fleet is composed of approximately 150 buses with an average age of 6 years. Most of the fleet is composed of Iveco chassis buses with 3 doors and 2 PRM spaces, although there are Volvo and Scania chassis buses. These buses have glass partition on the driver's seat to avoid robbery. Also, some of the buses have upper compartments for suitcases (for lines that go to the bus station)

The Alhambra Bus fleet is composed of Iveco-Mercedes 2 door minibuses, some of them with a space for PRM. Herederos de Gómez's buses are similar to those of Transportes Rober, but they only have two doors and no glass separations between the driver and passengers.

All buses are red (except LAC line buses, which are blue with 4 doors), have air conditioning and can sell tickets on board.

== Ticket prices ==
A ticket costs €1,40 and is valid for 60 minutes. A night bus ticket costs €1,50. Travelcards (known as Credibús) are available with a cost of €0,87, €0,85 and €0,83 for 60 minutes when charged €5, €10 and €20 respectively. Junior and University students Travelcards (Bono Joven and Bono Universitario) have similar prices. Travelcard holders must pay a €2 deposit. Fair buses have a cost of €2. Monthly passes cost €41, while pensioners living in Granada can travel for free.

== Bus routes ==
The current bus line scheme in Granada is organised with transport exchanges on the northern part of the city (Caleta and Triunfo) and the southern part (Paseo del Violón). Lines either connect these two locations or go from the transport exchanges to peripheral districts. Each line has a letter followed by a number. Letters identify which part of the city lines go through and numbers go from 0 to 9 (0 if it doesn't connect with a transport exchange and 1 to 9 following a clockwise starting point order in the north and anticlockwise starting point order in the south):

- LAC line (Línea de Alta Capacidad, High Capacity Line). It's the main line going through the city center.
- C lines. They go through the central part of the city (this includes the historical districts).
- N lines. They connect the northern transport exchanges with northern districts.
- S lines. They connect the southern transport exchange with southern districts.
- U lines. They connect various parts of the city with the different campuses of the University of Granada.
- SN lines. They connect the southern part with the northern part of the city. Originally all of these lines went through Camino de Ronda, now some of these lines go through the city center.
- Lines 111 and 121. They are clockwise and anticlockwise night routes around the city. Only operate weekends and holiday eves.
- F lines. During Corpus Christi week, these lines connect all districts with the Fair in the Almanjayar district. They have different prices to the other lines.

The bus transport system has direct connection with the Granada Metro on 12 stations.

LINE	ROUTE	FREQUENCY	OPERATED BY
LAC	Granada Conference Center - Caleta - Cruz del Sur	2' - 4'	Transportes Rober
C1	Plaza Nueva (City Center) - Albayzín	8'	Alhambra Bus
C2	Plaza Nueva (City Center) - Sacromonte	20'	Alhambra Bus
C3	Isabella the Catholic Square (City Center) - Alhambra	8' - 25'	Alhambra Bus
C4	Isabella the Catholic Square (City Center) - Cemetery - Barranco del Abogado	20' - 30'	Alhambra Bus
C5	Neptuno - Isabella the Catholic Square	30' - 35'	Alhambra Bus
C6	Mecina Bombarón Street (Rosaleda) - Madrid Avenue (Traumatología Hospital)	30'	Transportes Rober
C7	Cemetery - Puerta Real - Granada Conference Center	20'	Transportes Rober
N1	Chana - Bobadilla - Rector Marín Ocete Street (University dining rooms)	7' - 14'	Transportes Rober
N3	Cerrillo de Maracena - Rector Marín Ocete Street (University dining rooms)	10' - 14'	Transportes Rober
N4	Federico García Lorca Avenue - Granada Bus Station - Caleta	11' - 15'	Transportes Rober
N5	Modesto Cendoya Street - Joaquina Eguaras Street - Caleta	12' - 14'	Transportes Rober
N6	Casería del Cerro Street - Pulianas Avenue - Caleta	10' - 20'	Transportes Rober
N7	Parque Nueva Granada Urbanization - Hospicio Avenue (Triunfo)	10' - 18'	Transportes Rober
N8	El Fargue - Hospicio Avenue (Triunfo)	60'	Transportes Rober
N9	San Miguel Viewpoint - Constitution Avenue (Triunfo)	10' - 17'	Transportes Rober
S0	Cruz de Lagos - Bola de Oro Sports Center	30'	Alhambra Bus
S1	Los Rebites/Serrallo - Granada Conference Center	8' - 12'	Transportes Rober
S2	Villa Argaz - Tierno Galván Street (Granada Conference Center)	8' - 13'	Transportes Rober
S3	Granada Sports Center - Puerta Real - Granada Conference Center	6' - 15'	Transportes Rober
U1	Almunia Park (Aynadamar University Campus) - Cartuja University Campus	10' - 15'	Transportes Rober
U2	Einstein Square (Fuentenueva University Campus) - Cartuja University Campus	20'	Transportes Rober
U3	Technological Park of Health (PTS) - Cartuja University Campus - Alfacar Road	6' - 10'	Transportes Rober
SN1	Cenes de la Vega - Lancha del Genil - City Center - Granada Bus Station	10' - 20'	Herederos de Gómez
SN2	Granada Sports Center - Granada Bus Station	10' - 20'	Transportes Rober
SN3	Los Rebites - Eduardo María Fajardo Street (Chana)	10' - 20'	Transportes Rober
SN4	Technological Park of Health (PTS) - Sagrada Familia Street (Chana)	10' - 20'	Transportes Rober
SN5	Beethoven Street - Parque Nueva Granada Urbanization	10' - 20'	Transportes Rober
111	Night Bus (clockwise route)	10' - 16'	Alhambra Bus
121	Night Bus (anticlockwise route)	10' - 16'	Alhambra Bus
F1	Los Pinillos - Fair	10' - 15'	Transportes Rober
F2	Granada Sports Center - Fair	10'	Transportes Rober
F3	Dilar Avenue - Fair	10'	Transportes Rober
F4	Málaga Road (Chana) - Fair	10' - 15'	Transportes Rober
F5	El Pinar (Haza Grande) - Fair	60'	Transportes Rober
F6	Granada Conference Center - Fair	30'	Transportes Rober
