= Granada LAC =

Línea de Alta Capacidad (LAC)

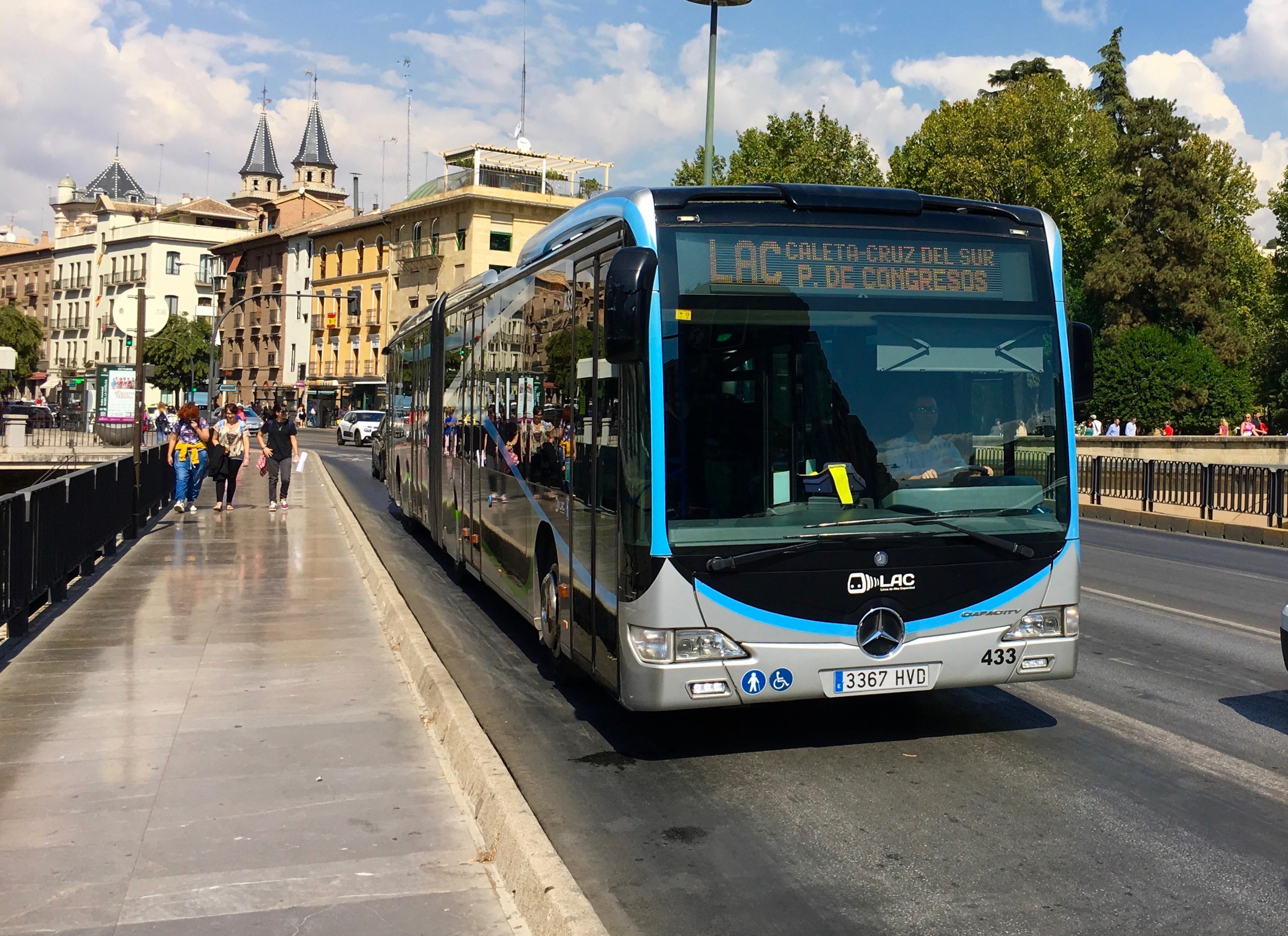
- LAC Bus in the center of Granada.

Overview
- Owner: City of Granada
- Locale: Granada, Spain
- Transit type: Bus rapid transit
- Number of stations: 19
- Daily ridership: 10 million (2016)
- Website: movilidadgranada.com

Operation
- Began operation: 29 June 2014
- Number of vehicles: 15

Technical
- System length: 8.4 km (5.2 mi)
System map

The High Capacity Line (in Spanish Línea de Alta Capacidad, commonly known as LAC) is a BRT (bus rapid transit) system for the city center of Granada (Spain) integrated into its urban bus network. Its main objective is to provide a high frequency service to the center district, complementing the Granada Metro and the rest of urban bus lines.

It was inaugurated on June 29, 2014. Its management and ownership, as the rest of urban bus lines, corresponds to the area of mobility of the Mayor of Granada.

== Line ==
The High Capacity Line crosses in an exclusive way the main axis of the city. Starting from La Caleta, follows through Andalucia Ave., Cruz del Sur, Sur Ave., Constitucion Ave., Gran Vía, Reyes Católicos, Puerta Real, Acera del Darro and Paseo del Violón; turns in the Aviación Roundabout to get back with the same itinerary. In these four kilometres of tour are located the major concentration of shops and hostelry, monuments and centres of cultural interest or administrative.

== Fleet ==
LAC's fleet is composed of fifteen articulated buses, Mercedes-Benz "CapaCity" model. Each vehicle is 20 meters long and has a capacity of approximately 200 passengers. They have four doors that allow the entrance and exit of passengers, one of them with a ramp to allow access for people with reduced mobility. Inside the vehicles, the system is provided with information screens for the traveler and automated public address system.
