= Laksha Gala Sankeertanarchana =

Guinness record-breaking mass singing event held at Hyderabad

Laksha Gala Sankeertanarchana (Telugu: లక్షగళ సంకీర్తనార్చన) was a record-breaking mass singing event held on 10 May 2009 at Parade Grounds in Secunderabad, Andhra Pradesh, India. An association called Silicon Andhra in association with Tirumala Tirupati Devasthanams (TTD) and the Department of Culture, Government of Andhra Pradesh held the event.

Over 160,000 singers of all ages prominently with representation from the youth sang at once in one voice the following Saptagiri Keerthans thereby establishing a Guinness World Record.

- Bhavamulona
- Bramhakadigina Padamu
- Enthamatramuna
- Podagantimayya
- Kondalalo nelakonna
- Narayanathe Namo Namo
- Muddugare Yashoda.

Though the intended group size was 100,000 the group was estimated as 160,000.

== Guinness Record ==
Guinness World Records official Raymond Marshall announced the record break. The previous record was established in then Germany by a choir of 60,000 in 1937.

== Live broadcast ==
A Hyderabad-Based TV News Channel called TV9 (Telugu) broadcast the event live.
