= Lac =

Lac may refer to:

== Places ==
=== Africa ===
- Lac Region, a district in Chad
- Lac Prefecture, a district in Chad

=== America ===
- Rivière du Lac, a tributary of the Montmorency River, in Capitale-Nationale, Quebec, Canada

=== Europe ===
- Laç, a city in Albania
- Lac, a village in Voloiac Commune, Mehedinţi County, Romania
- Lac district, a district in the canton of Fribourg, Switzerland
- Lancing railway station, a railway station in Sussex, England (station code: LAC)

=== Elsewhere ===
- Lac, a standard astronomical constellation abbreviation of Lacerta
- Latin America and the Caribbean or LAC, a regional definition by the United Nations

== Other uses ==
- Lac (resin), a resinous substance produced by insects
  - Shellac, the processed form of this resin
- Lac, French for lake (body of water)
- lác, an element in Anglo-Saxon names meaning "fight, play"
- Lac, a character in Arthurian romance, father of Erec
- LAC, the ICAO operator designator for Lockheed Corporation (Lockheed Aircraft Corporation), United States
- L.Ac., Licensed Acupuncturist, see Regulation of acupuncture
- Lac operon, abbreviated Lac, operon controlling the metabolism of lactose in bacteria such as E. coli
- Lac Viet, the ancient people of northern Vietnam, also called Lạc in Vietnamese and Luòyuè in Chinese
- Lakh, or Lac, a unit in the South Asian numbering system equal to one hundred thousand (100,000)
- An abbreviation for the Los Angeles Chargers, a professional football team
- An abbreviation for the Los Angeles Clippers, a professional basketball team
- Leading aircraftman, a rank in the United Kingdom and many Commonwealth air forces
- An abbreviation for Library and Archives Canada

== See also ==
- LAC (disambiguation)
- Lanthanum carbide (LaC2)
- Lack (disambiguation)
- Lak (disambiguation)
- Le Lac (disambiguation)
