= Laks (Nuer) =

Nuer tribe

The Lak are a tribe of the Nuer people, a Nilotic ethnic group from South Sudan. The Lak are part of the Central Nuer alongside the Thiang, Gawaar, and other tribes. Their ancestral territories are located primarily in the greater Upper Nile region.

== History ==
The Lak were considered Central Nuer, and an important Nuer tribe. E. E. Evans-Pritchard estimated the Lak population at 24,000 in 1940.

They were targeted in punitive campaigns in 1911, 1912, and 1914 in Anglo-Egyptian Sudan. During the Second Sudanese Civil War, there was a self-declared prophet named Wutnyang Gatkek who was from the Lak tribe and led a significant militia.

The Lak were distinct from the Leek (Lek), another Nuer tribe.
