= Claudia van Laak =

German radio journalist

Claudia van Laak (born 1963 in Münster (region) NRW, Germany) is a German radio journalist. For the Germany radio she is correspondent for Berlin and chief of the Berlin broadcast studio.

== Life ==
She made her entrance at the WDR broadcast. German studies. She studied journalism, economics and Spanish in Bamberg and Barcelona. In freelance she was active for Bavarian Radio and Radio Z, followed by June 1990 a permanent position as an editor at Central German Broadcast Stadion MDR. Until in 1996 she joined Deutschlandradio (Deutschlandfunk) as regional correspondent in Thuringia, and later in Brandenburg, since 2009 in Berlin.

Since 2004 she is the (co-)author of over 40 broadcasts of the daily background magazine on Deutschlandfunk at 06:40 pm on political and social topics. She is present in the Campus & Career and other broadcasts almost several times a week in Deutschlandfunk Broadcast Station.

== Awards ==
- 2002: Special Award of the Central German Journalist Award for her report "Radiant Heritage – Ten years ago began the renovation Wismut"
- 2009: Nomination for the German-Polish Journalist Award for "Guben, Gubin and the Neisse – half an year an open border"
