= Krška Vas, Brežice =

Krška Vas
- Location in Slovenia
- Coordinates: 45°53′31.94″N 15°34′15.92″E
- Country: Slovenia
- Traditional region: Lower Carniola
- Statistical region: Lower Sava
- Municipality: Brežice

Area
  - Total: 3.61 km^{2} (1.39 sq mi)
- Elevation: 146.8 m (482 ft)

Population (2020)
  - Total: 485
  - Density: 134/km^{2} (348/sq mi)

Krška Vas (pronounced [ˈkəɾʃka ˈʋaːs]; Slovene: Krška vas, German: Munkendorf) is a village on the left bank of the Krka River, at its confluence with the Sava, in the Municipality of Brežice in eastern Slovenia. The area is part of the traditional region of Lower Carniola. It is now included in the Lower Sava Statistical Region.

== History ==
On the right bank of the Sava River, north of the main settlement in a small field area known as Zasavje, a late medieval village called Zasavje (German: Sasauje) was abandoned and never resettled after it was destroyed by severe flooding on January 25, 1781. The area is now considered an archaeological site, although it has not been excavated. Field surveys and aerial photography in the Trnje area of Krška Vas indicate the presence of foundations of buildings from the Roman era.

== Landmarks ==
=== Church ===
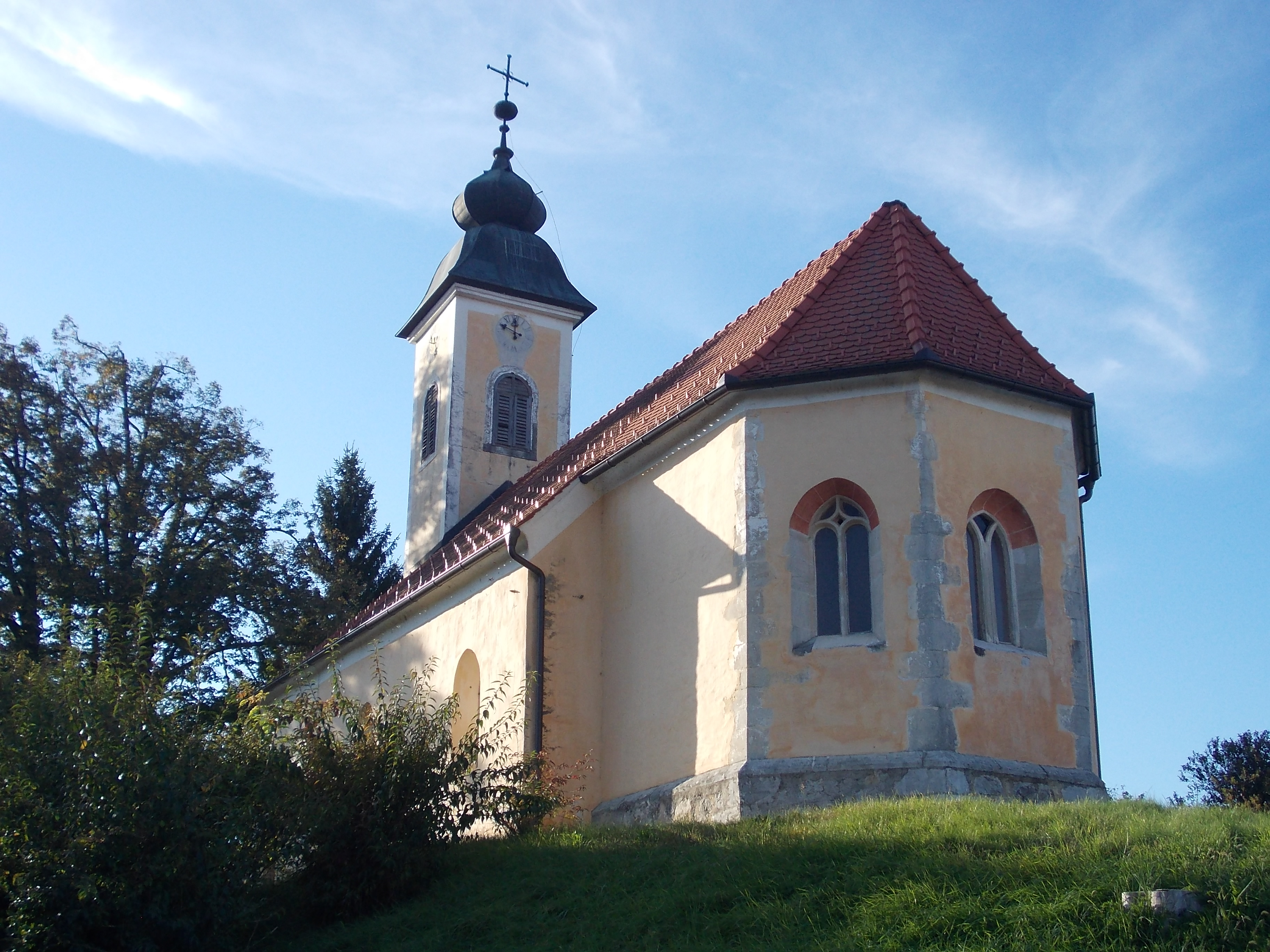
Saints Hermagoras and Fortunatus Church

The village church is dedicated to Saints Hermagoras and Fortunatus and belongs to the parish of Cerklje ob Krki. It was built in the 16th century and some of the original wall paintings are preserved. The single nave has flat roof and a multi-angular star vaulted sanctuary. The western facade was remodeled in the Baroque style in the 18th century.
