= Laks =

Laks may refer to:

- Laks (Caucasus), an ethnic group of Dagestan, North Caucasus, Russia
- Lak (tribe), a Kurdish and Lur tribe in southwestern Iran
- Simon Laks (1901-1983), Polish composer and violinist who became head of the prisoners' orchestra at Birkenau-Auschwitz concentration camp

== See also ==
- Lacs (disambiguation)
- Lachs, a surname
- Lak (disambiguation)
- Lakh, a unit in the Indian numbering system
- LAX (disambiguation)
- Laksha (disambiguation)
- Laksa (disambiguation)
