= Lak Lak Ashian =

Village in Razavi Khorasan province, Iran

Lak Lak Ashian لک‌لک آشیان
- village
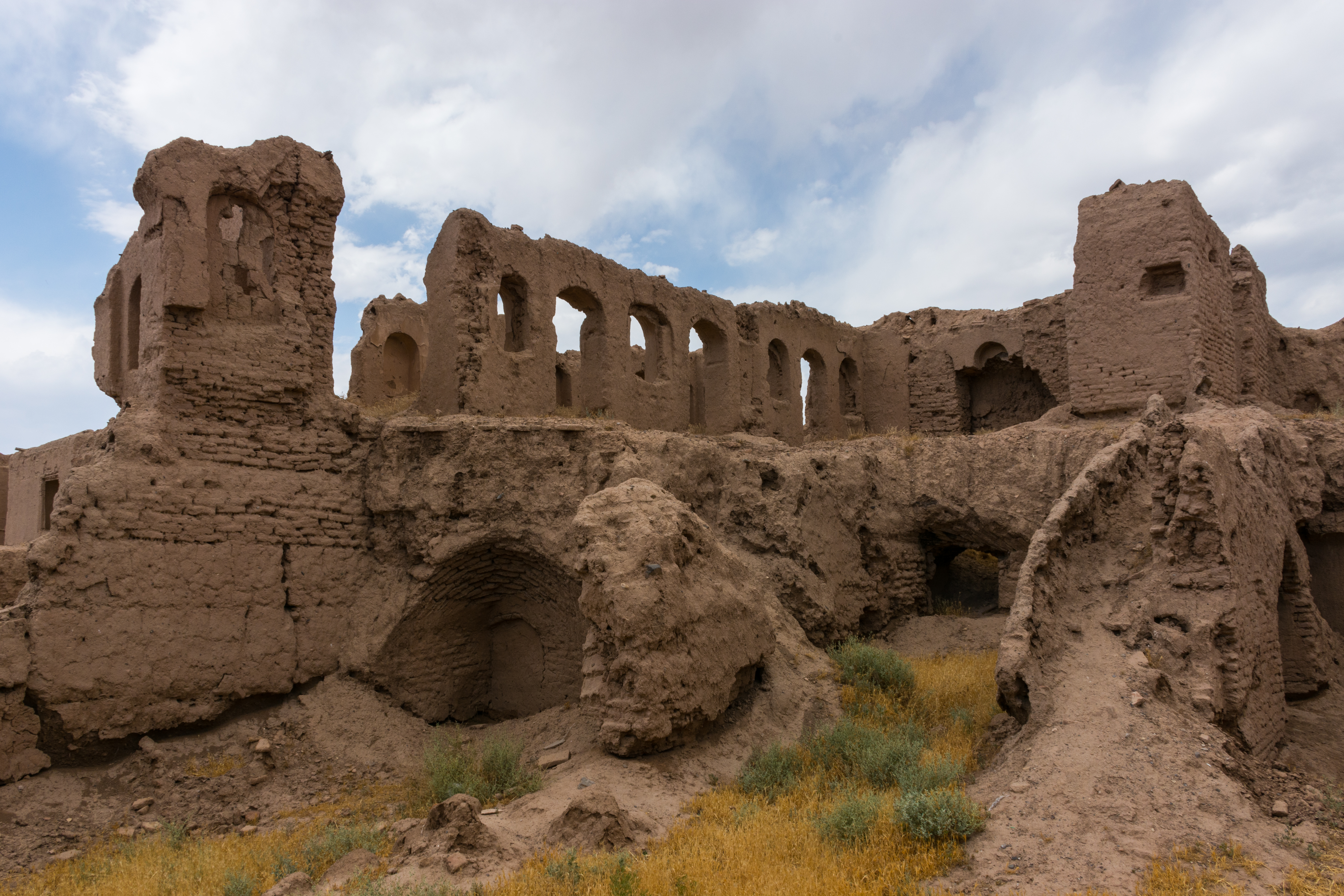

- Location within Iran
- Coordinates: 36°09′46″N 58°50′48″E
- Country: Iran
- Province: Razavi Khorasan
- County: Nishapur
- Bakhsh: Central
- Rural District: Darbqazi

Population (2006)
  - Total: 88
- Time zone: UTC+3:30 (IRST)
  - Summer (DST): UTC+4:30 (IRDT)

Lak Lak Ashian (Persian: لک‌لک آشیان, also Romanized as Lak Lak Āshīān) is a village in Darbqazi Rural District, in the Central District of Nishapur County, Razavi Khorasan Province, Iran. At the 2006 census, its population was 88, in 29 families.

== Lak Lak Ashian Castle ==
The ruins of the Lak Lak Ashian Castle are situated in this village. The castle was built during the Qajar era. It has been registered as a national heritage of Iran with the registration number of 12062.

== Gallery ==
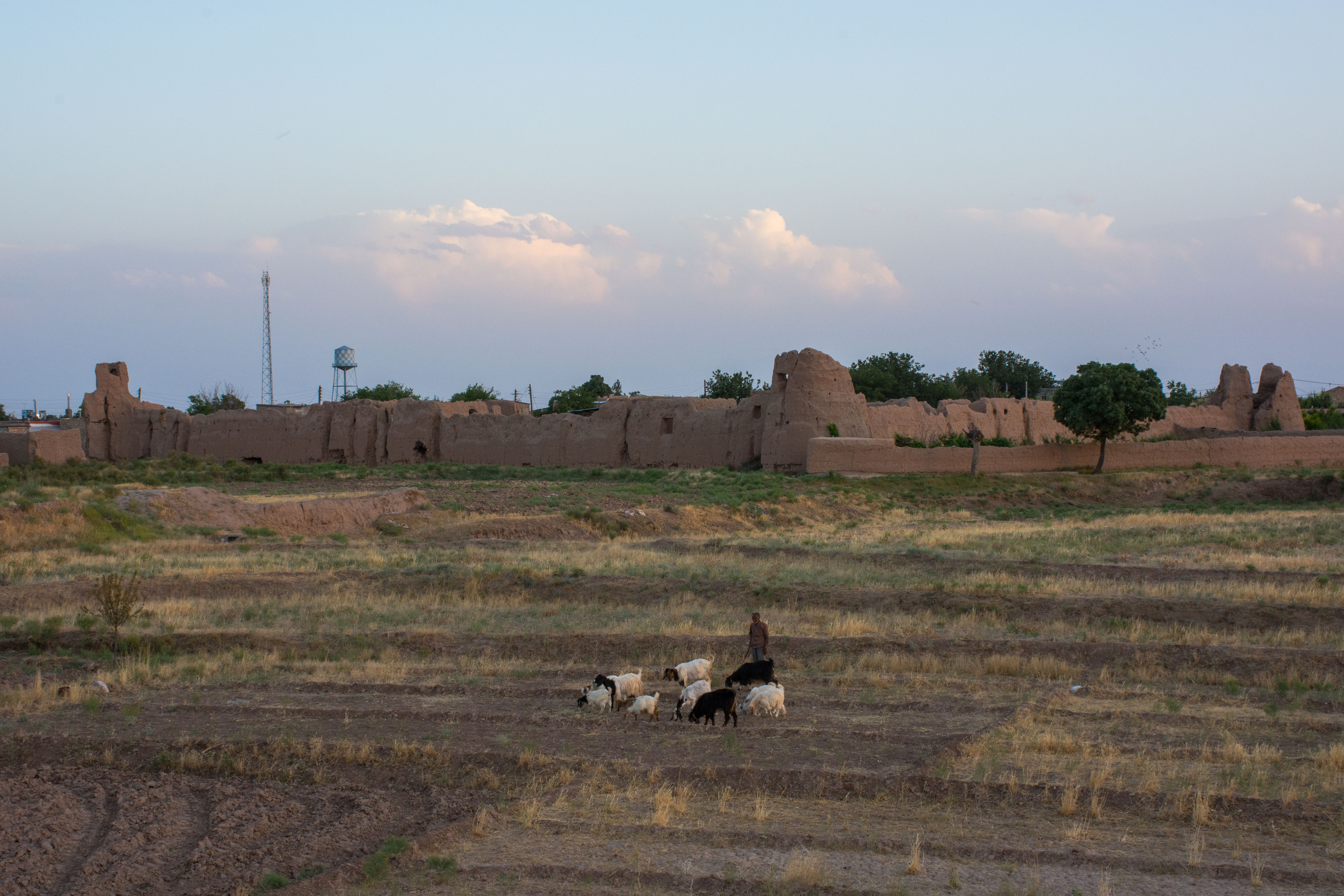

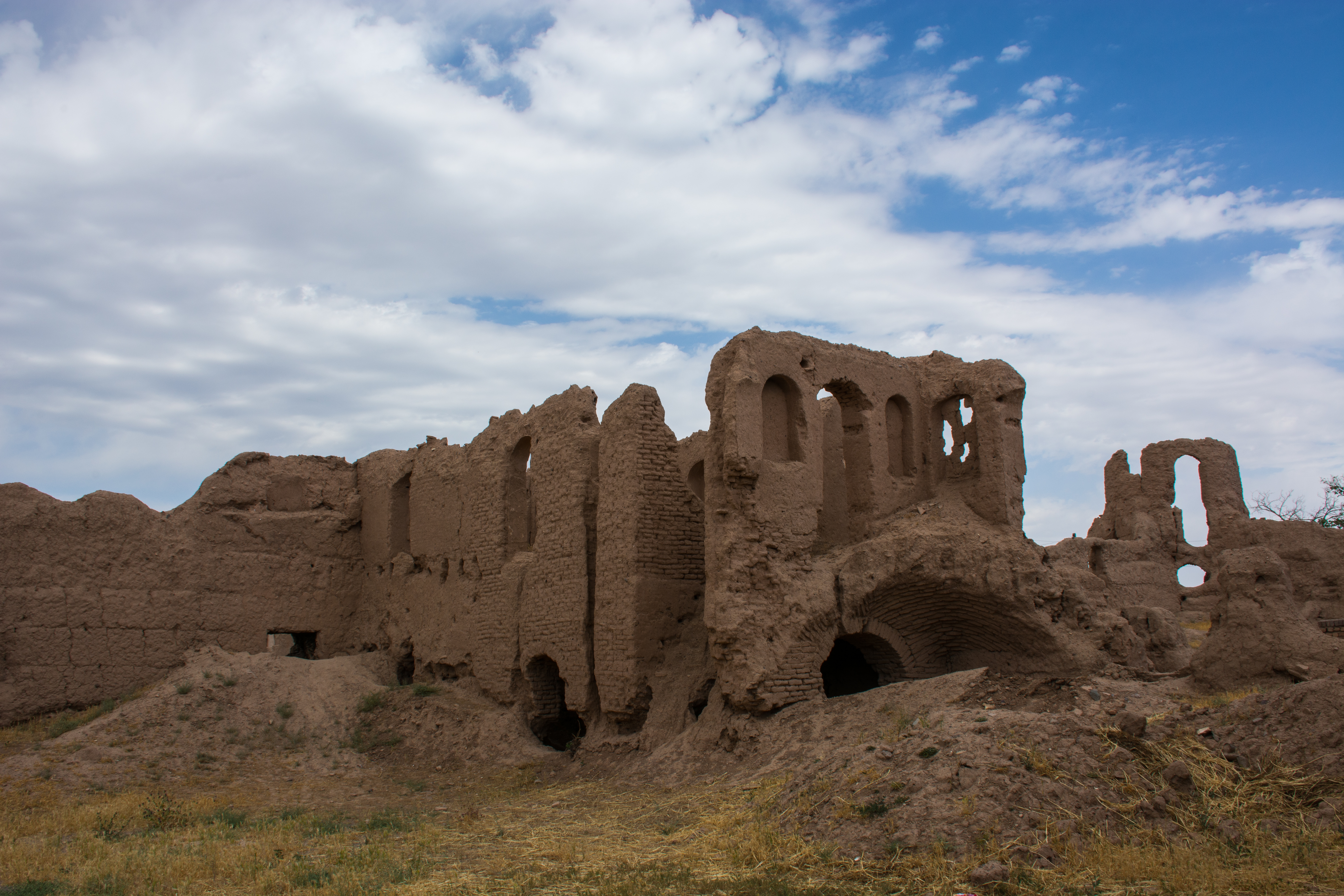
