= Lak Lag =

Lak Lag لك لگ
- Village
- Location within Iran
- Coordinates: 36°25′30″N 59°36′57″E
- Country: Iran
- Province: Razavi Khorasan
- County: Mashhad
- Bakhsh: Central
- Rural District: Tabadkan

Population (2006)
  - Total: 296
- Time zone: UTC+3:30 (IRST)
  - Summer (DST): UTC+4:30 (IRDT)

Lak Lag (Persian: لك لگ, also Romanized as Lak Lak, Laklak, and Laq Laq) is a village in Tabadkan Rural District, in the Central District of Mashhad County, Razavi Khorasan Province, Iran. At the 2006 census, its population was 296, in 73 families.
