= Lax Lake (Minnesota) =

Lake in the state of Minnesota, United States

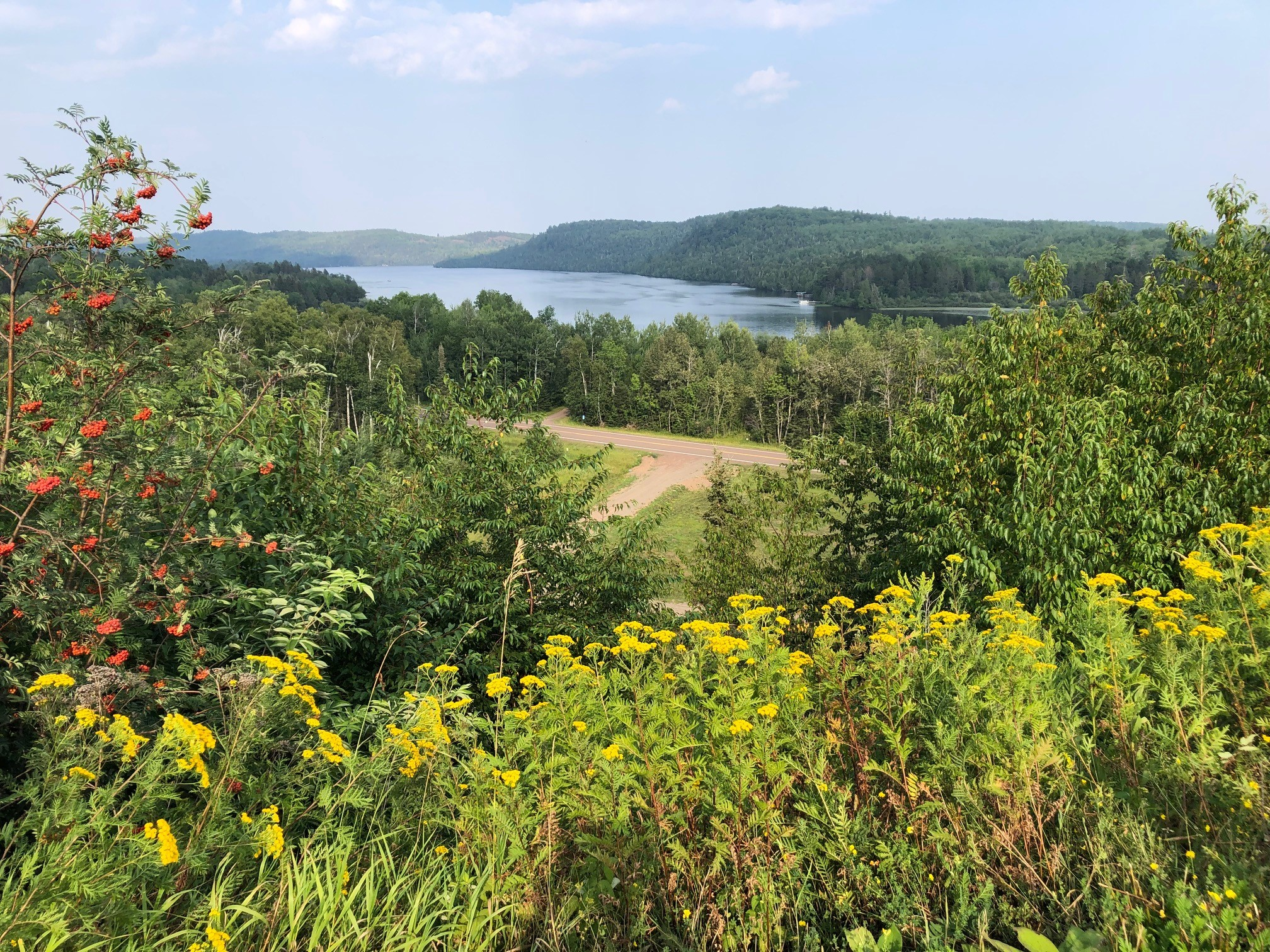
- Lax Lake view from hill.

- Location within Minnesota
- Location: Lake County, Minnesota
- Coordinates: 47°20′45″N 91°17′51″W
- Type: lake

Lax Lake is a lake in Lake County, in the U.S. state of Minnesota.

Lax Lake derives its name from John Waxlax, an early settler. The lake is approximately 4 miles north of Silver Bay, and about 6 miles south of Finland, Minnesota. It has 1 public boat landing just off of Superior National Forest Scenic Byway.

== See also ==
- List of lakes in Minnesota
