= L.A.C. Battle of Galwan =

Indian Hindi-language war film

- Directed by: Nitin Kumar Gupta
- Written by: Nitin Kumar Gupta
- Produced by: Nitin Kumar Gupta; Vikram Jadhav
- Starring: Rahul Roy; Nishant Singh Malkani; Vishal Sharma
- Music by: Nitin Kumar Gupta
- Production company: Neole Films
- Distributed by: YouTube (digital)
- Release date: 11 January 2025
- Running time: 83 minutes
- Country: India
- Language: Hindi

L.A.C. Battle of Galwan is a 2025 Indian Hindi-language war film written and directed by Nitin Kumar Gupta. Based on the 2020 Galwan Valley clash between India and China at the Line of Actual Control (L.A.C.), it is notable for being India's first single-shot war film, filmed in one continuous 83-minute take. The film stars Rahul Roy, Nishant Singh Malkani, and Vishal Sharma.

== Plot ==
The film depicts the events of 15 June 2020, when 20 Indian soldiers engaged in hand-to-hand combat with Chinese forces at the Galwan Valley in Ladakh. The story follows the soldiers' sacrifice and bravery during the confrontation at 15,000 feet altitude.

== Cast ==
- Rahul Roy as Col. Suresh Yadav (based on Col. B. Santosh Babu)
- Nishant Singh Malkani
- Vishal Om Prakash Sharma as Maj. Kartar Singh
- Nitin Kumar Gupta as Xiangshi
- Anoop Bikram Singh as Chinese major

== Production ==
=== Development ===
Following the Galwan Valley clash in June 2020, director Nitin Kumar Gupta decided to create a tribute to the 20 soldiers who died in the conflict. The film was conceived as a single-shot feature to reflect the continuous nature of the actual combat.

=== Filming ===
Principal photography took place in November 2020 in Kargil, Ladakh, at temperatures of minus 14°C. The entire film was shot in one continuous take without cuts or edits. During production, lead actor Rahul Roy suffered a brain stroke due to the extreme weather conditions and had to be airlifted first to Srinagar and then to Nanavati Hospital in Mumbai.

== Release ==
The film was submitted to the Central Board of Film Certification (CBFC) in June 2022. According to the director, the CBFC requested multiple modifications including:

- Removal of "LAC" from the title
- Deletion of references to the actual location
- 33% reduction in combat scenes
- Removal of photographs of the 20 martyrs from the end credits

The film was released on YouTube on 11 January 2025, after three years of awaiting CBFC certification.

== Awards ==
The film received the Rashtriya Military School Award for Excellence in Portrayal of Martyrs.

== See also ==
- Galwan Valley skirmish
- 2020–2021 China–India skirmishes
- Line of Actual Control
- One-shot film
