= Lack (surname) =

Lack is a surname. Notable people with the surname include:

- Andrew Lack (author) (born 1953), English biologist and author
- Andrew Lack (executive) (born 1947), chairman of NBC News and MSNBC
- David Lack (1910–1973), British ornithologist and biologist
- Eddie Lack (born 1988), Calgary Flames goaltender
- Fredell Lack (1922–2017), American classical violinist
- James J. Lack (born 1944), New York politician and judge
- Ken Lack (1934–2001), Jamaican record producer
- Mercie Lack (1894-1985), British photographer
- Portia Lack (born 1961), American handball player
- Saskja Lack (born 2000), Swiss freestyle skier
- Simon Lack (1913–1980), Scottish actor
- Stephen Lack (born 1946), Scottish painter and actor
- Théodore Lack (1846–1921), French classical pianist and composer
