= Locatable Address Conversion System =

US Postal Service address update service

Locatable Address Conversion System (LACS) is a service offered by the United States Postal Service to update mailing addresses when a street is renamed or the address is updated for 911. In the case of 911, the address is changed from a rural route format to an urban/city route format. E.G. RR 2 BOX 8, SOME CITY, TX would become 2601 BELMONT DR, SOME CITY, TX.

A check of address using LACS is typically not performed by the USPS, but by third parties who license the LACS data from the USPS. A licensee will create or purchase software to perform the LACS check and receive monthly or bi-monthly updates of LACS data from the USPS.
