= Two Harbors =

Two Harbors may refer the following locations in the United States:

- Two Harbors, California, on Santa Catalina Island
- Two Harbors, Minnesota
  - Two Harbors station

== See also ==
- Twin Harbors State Park
