= Ryan Anderson (musher) =

American dog sled racer (b. 1981)

Ryan Anderson (born April 15, 1981) is a four-time Beargrease champion dog musher and dog sled racer from Minnesota.

== Beargrease champion races ==
Year	Race	Time
2022	Marathon	54:27
2017	Marathon	43:41
2015	Marathon	35:23
2011	Marathon	67:54
2001	Mid-Distance	20:01

== Iditarod ==
Anderson dropped out of the 1,049-mile Iditarod Trail Sled Dog Race across Alaska in 2017, after his dogs fell ill.

== Personal life ==
Anderson has been around the sport of racing dogs since age five. He started racing at age 10. He won numerous races starting in 2001, when he won the mid-distance John Beargrease Dog Sled championship. He won the UP 200 six times, more than any other UP 200 champion, as well as other championship races such as the Can-Am once and the Hudson Bay Quest twice.

Anderson grew up in Pine City, Minnesota and lives in Cushing, Wisconsin with his wife, Missy, and their two children. When he is not mushing, he works in construction. The couple has about 40 Alaskan huskies.
