= John Beargrease Dog Sled Race =

Dogsled race in Minnesota, USA

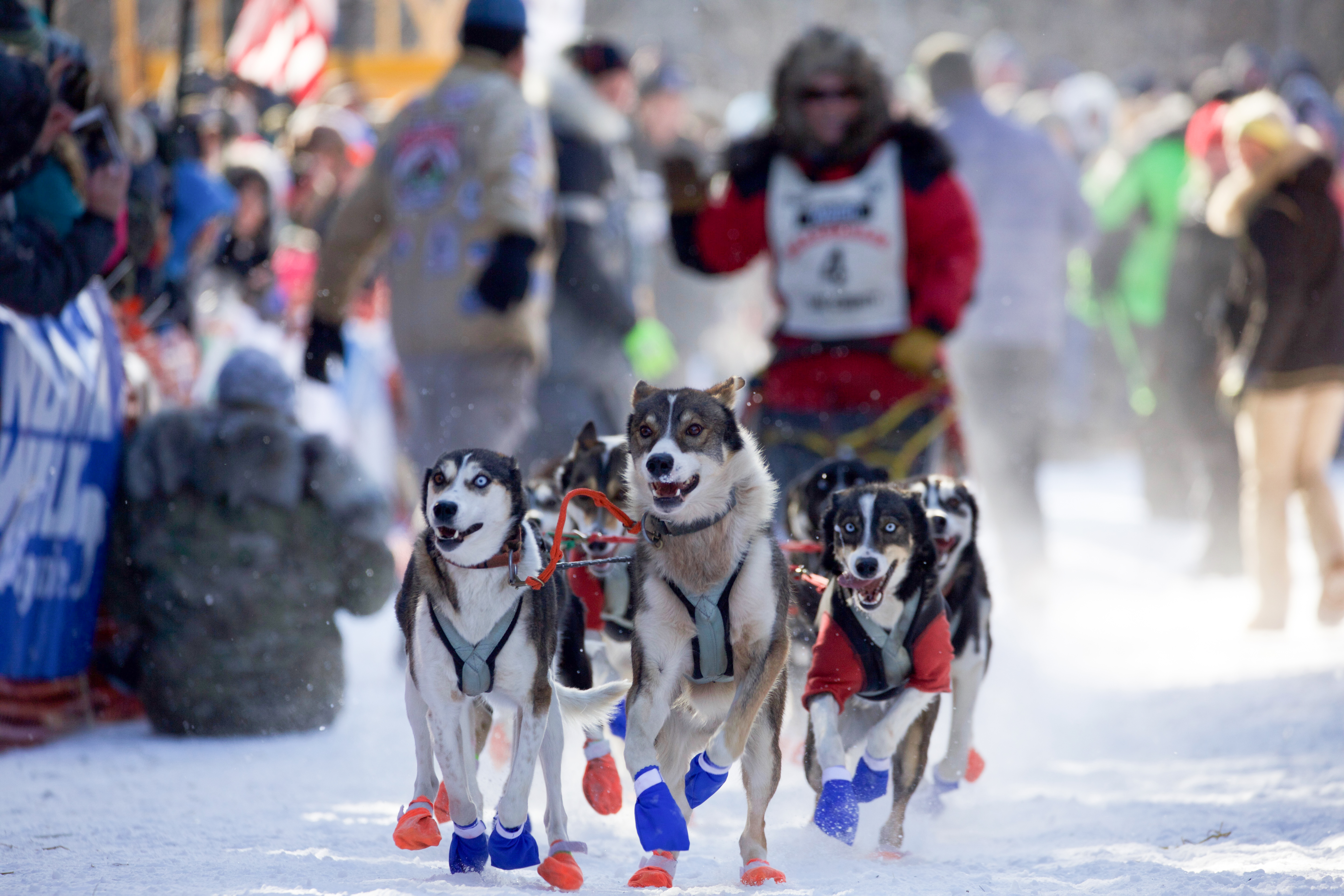
2017 John Beargrease Dog Sled Race

The John Beargrease Sled Dog Race is a dogsled race held along the North Shore of Lake Superior in northeast Minnesota. At 400 miles, it is the longest sled dog race in the lower 48 states. The "Beargrease" is a qualifier for the famed Iditarod race in Alaska.

The name of the race honors John Beargrease, a winter mail carrier who traveled by dog sled between Two Harbors, Minnesota and Grand Portage, Minnesota during the last two decades of the nineteenth century.

The race has been held every January since 1980, and starts from Billy's Bar in Duluth, Minnesota.

The race was rerouted in 2019, and the course was shortened by 70 miles, due to lack of snow.

In 2022 the race was won by Ryan Anderson from Cushing, Wisconsin. It was Anderson's fourth win. Soft snow due to warm temperatures caused 13 mushers to drop out of the race before finishing. Winning time was two days and just over 6.5 hours.

== See also ==
- Sled dog
- Drafting
- Mushing
- Dogsled racing
- List of sled dog races
