= Warren E. Hastings =

American politician

Warren E. Hastings (July 3, 1887 – May 3, 1970) was an American locomotive engineer and politician.

Hastings was born on a farm in Alcona County, Michigan, He moved with his parents to Lake County, Minnesota in 1900 and settled in Two Harbors, Minnesota. Hastings went to the Two Harbors public schools. He lived with his wife and family in Two Harbors and was a locomotive engineer for the Duluth and Iron Range Railroad. Hastings served in the Minnesota House of Representatives from 1925 to 1936.
