= Climate change in Minnesota =

Climate change in the US state of Minnesota

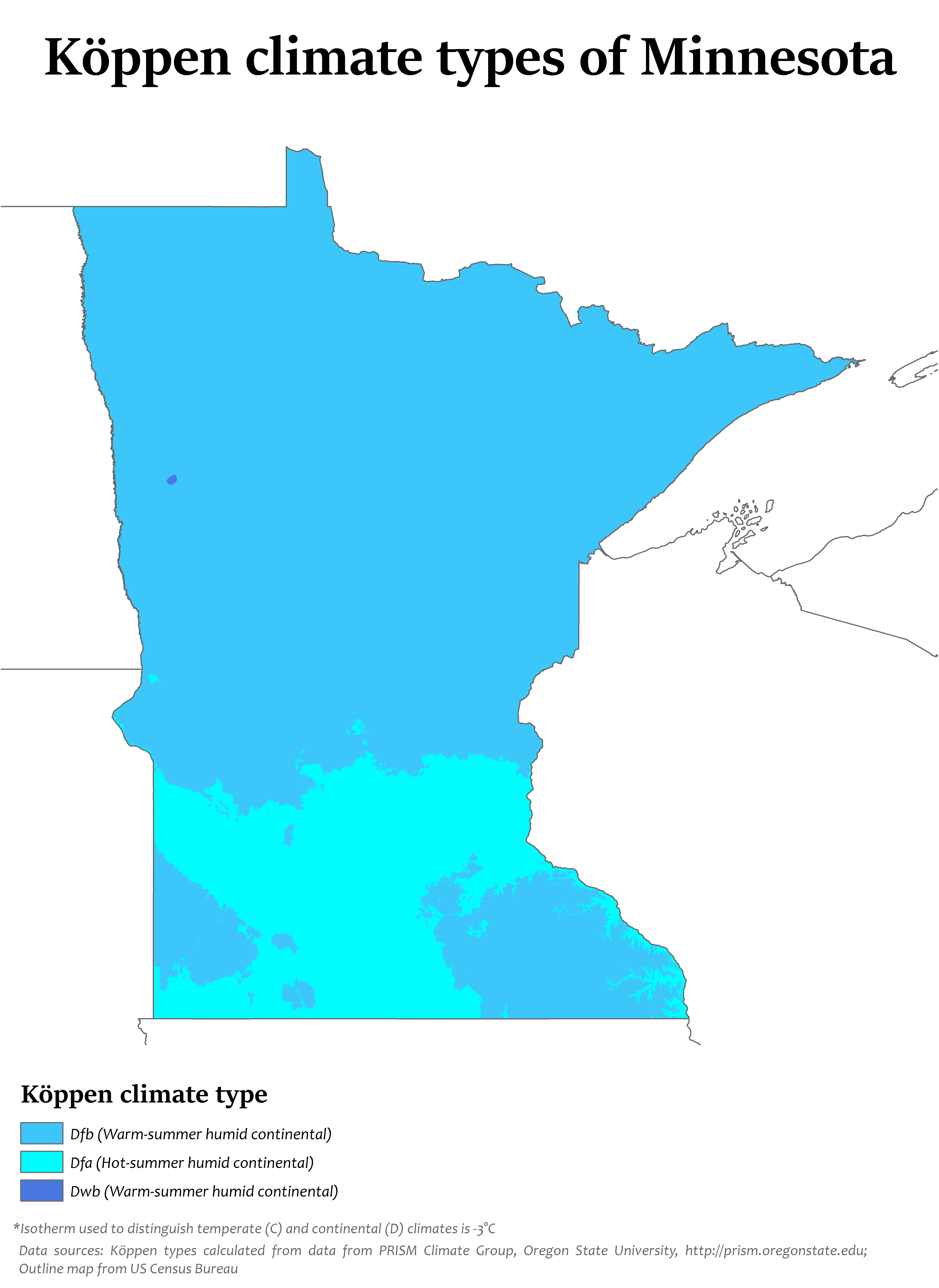
Köppen climate types in Minnesota, showing the state to be mostly warm-summer humid continental, with significant hot-summer humid continental portions.

Climate change in Minnesota encompasses the effects of climate change, attributed to human-caused increases in atmospheric carbon dioxide, in the U.S. state of Minnesota.

The United States Environmental Protection Agency has reported that "Minnesota's climate is changing. The state has warmed one to three degrees (F) in the 20th century. Floods are becoming more frequent, and ice cover on lakes is forming later and melting sooner. In the coming decades, these trends are likely to continue. Rising temperatures may interfere with winter recreation, extend the growing season, change the composition of trees in the North Woods, and increase water pollution problems in lakes and rivers. The state will have more extremely hot days, which may harm public health in urban areas and corn harvests in rural areas".

A 2015 Minnesota Public Radio (MPR) News report describing various indicators that the climate of Minnesota was changing noted specific regional trends of increasing temperatures and precipitation, and effects on trees and wildlife.

== Heavy precipitation and flooding ==
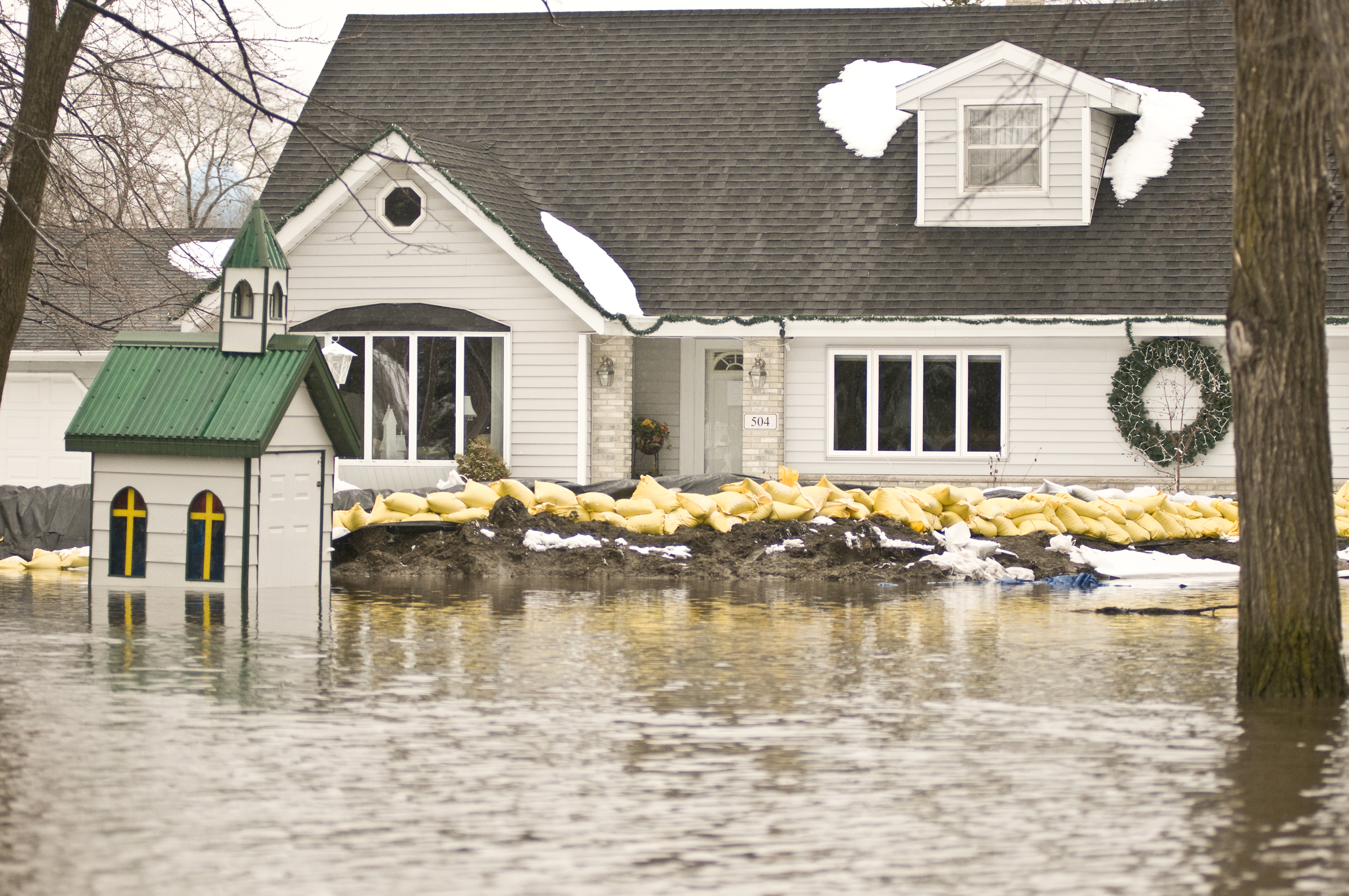
Red River in flood, 2009

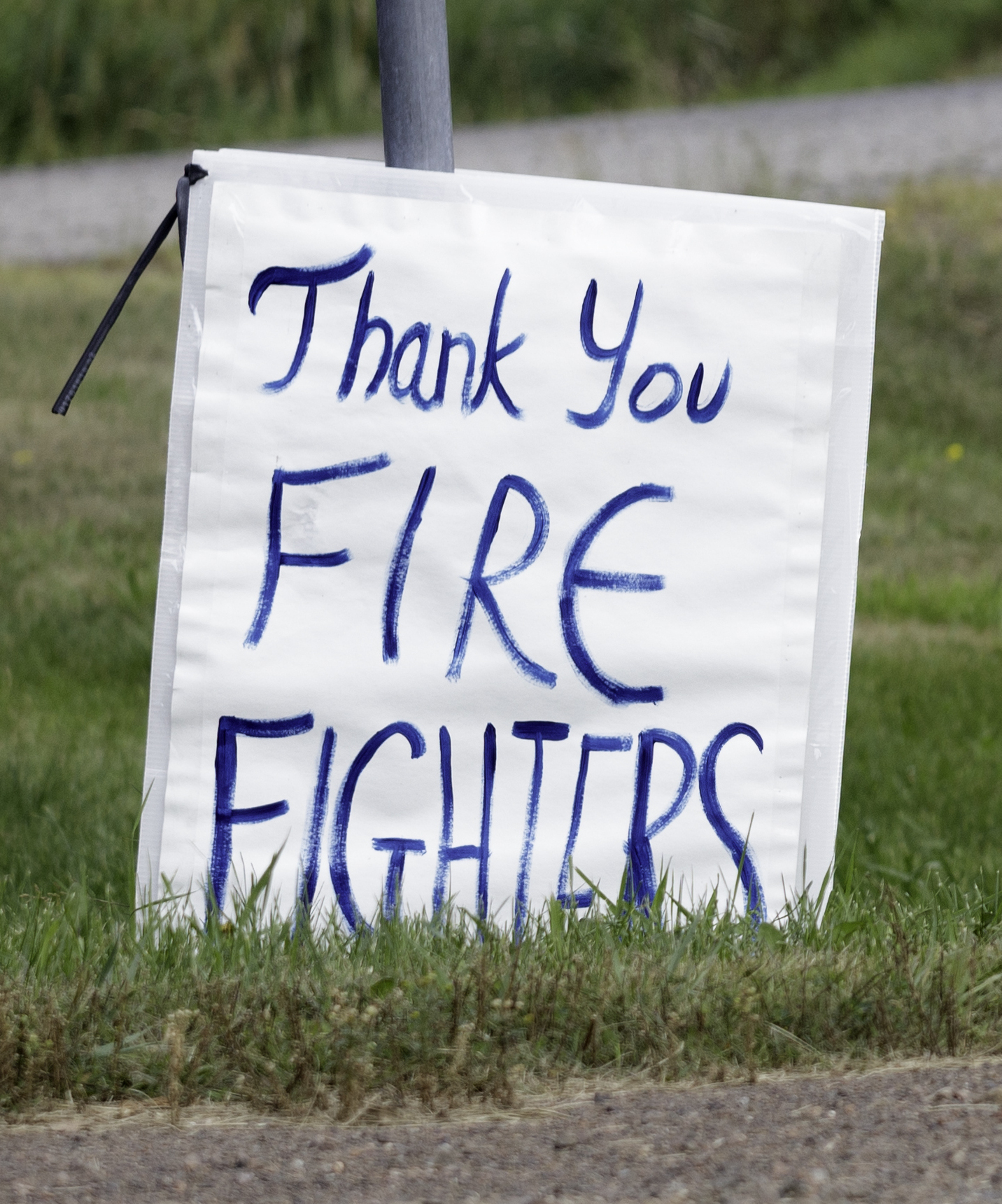
Sign thanking firefighters along Highway 1 during the Greenwood Fire, Finland, 2021

"Changing the climate is likely to increase the frequency of floods in Minnesota. Over the last half century, average annual precipitation in most of the Midwest has increased by 5 to 10 percent. But rainfall during the four wettest days of the year has increased about 35 percent. During the next century, spring rainfall and annual precipitation are likely to increase, and severe rainstorms are likely to intensify. Each of these factors will tend to further increase the risk of flooding". MPR News specifically identified several different patterns of increased overall precipitation, and increased instances of destructive heavy rains and storms.

== Lakes and rivers ==
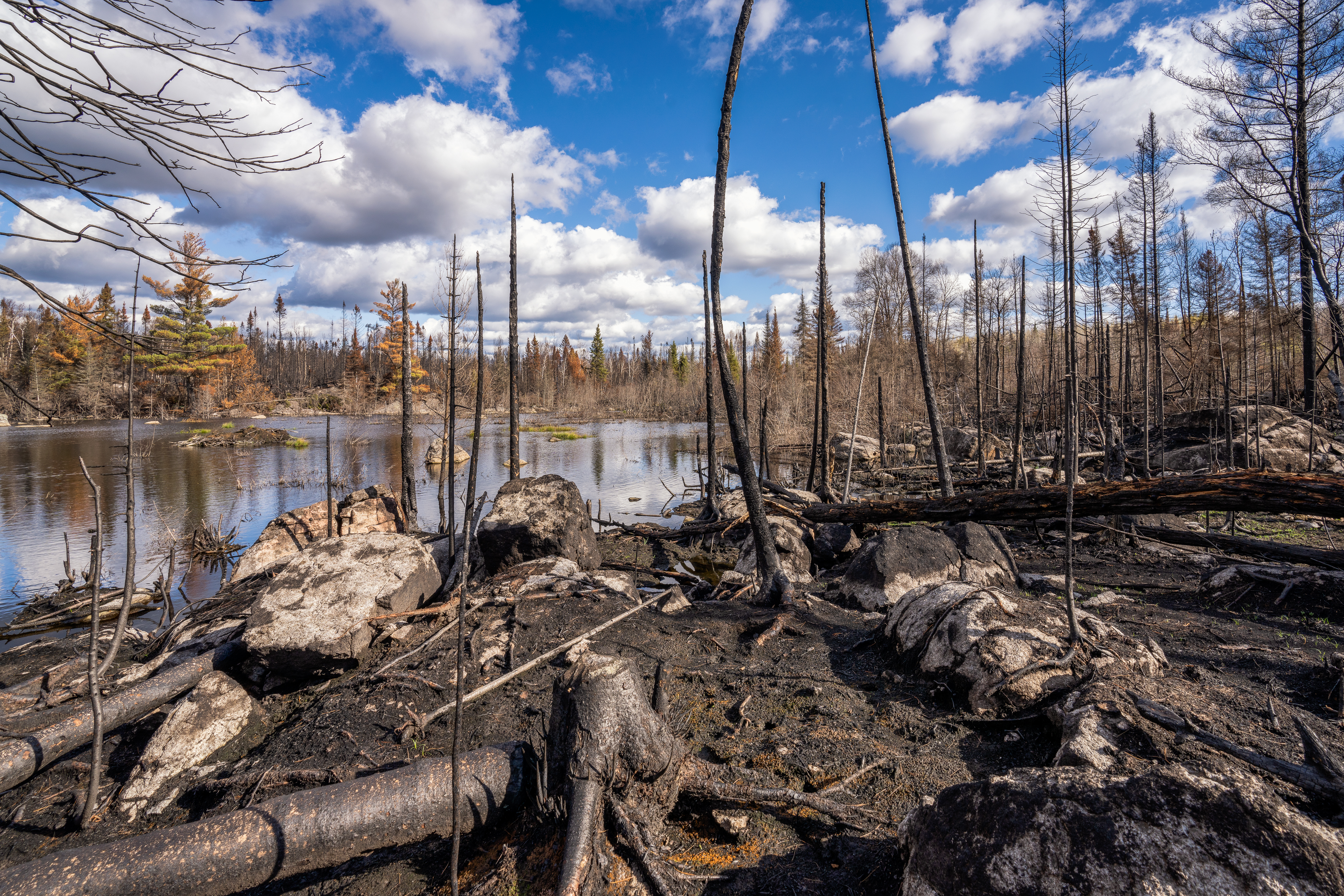
Dead trees, Greenwood Fire, 2021

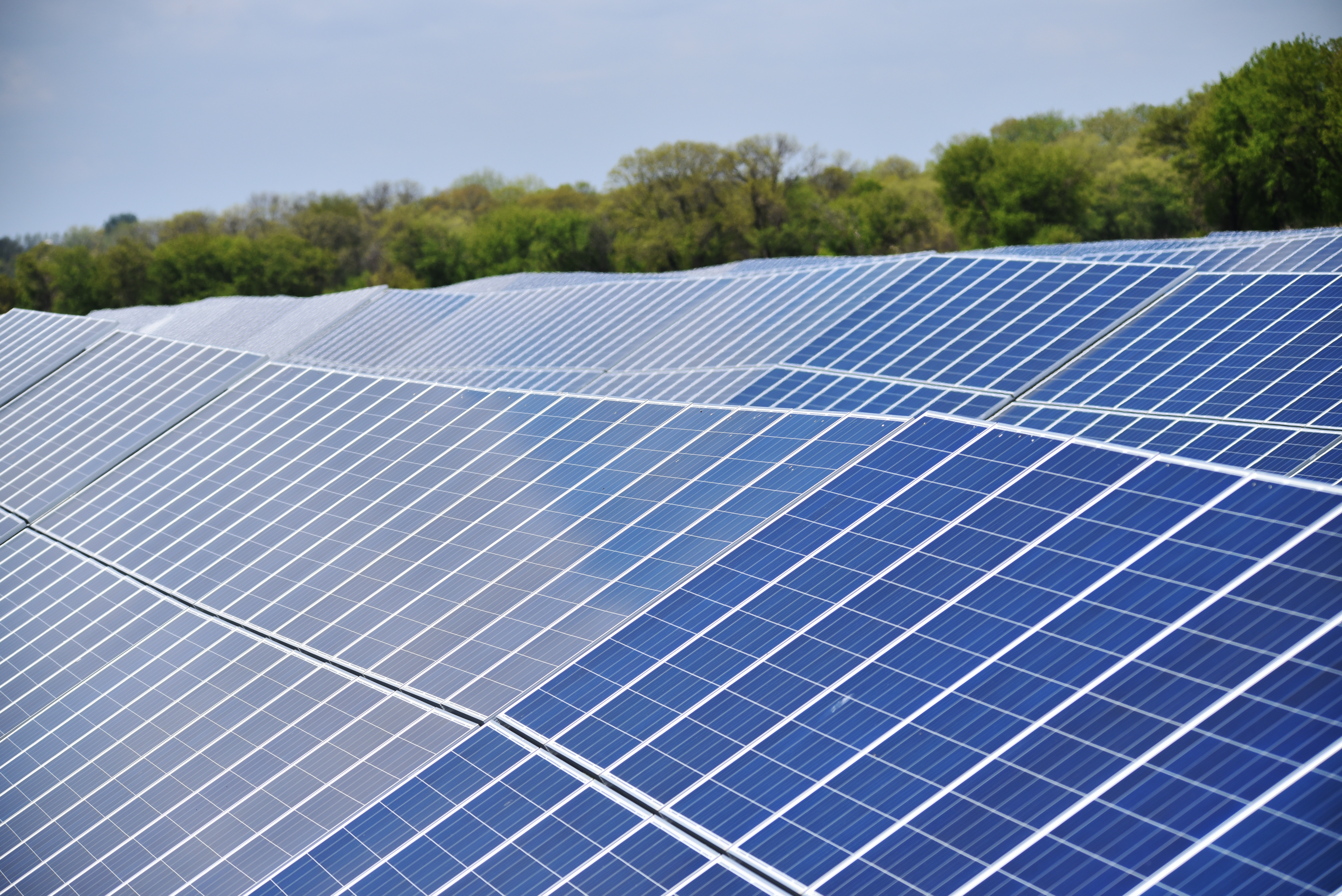
Solar panels

"Flooding is occasionally a problem for both navigation and riverfront communities, and greater river flows could make these problems worse. In the Red River watershed, river flows during the worst flood of the year have been increasing about 10 percent per decade since the 1920s. Floods are also becoming more severe in the upper Mississippi watershed. In June 2014, a flood forced two port facilities in St. Paul to stop operating, and barges waiting to unload had to be temporarily parked in Pigs Eye Lake until the river receded".

"Increasingly severe droughts elsewhere in the Mississippi River Basin could also pose problems for navigation in Minnesota. For example, a drought in 2012 led the U.S. Army Corps of Engineers to restrict navigation on the lower Mississippi River, which affected shipping upstream. Warmer winters reduce the number of days that ice prevents navigation. Between 1994 and 2011, the decline in ice cover lengthened the shipping season on the Great Lakes by eight days. The Great Lakes are likely to warm another 3° to 7°F in the next 70 years, which will further extend the shipping season".

"Higher temperatures and heavier storms could harm water quality in Minnesota's lakes and rivers. Warmer water tends to cause more algal blooms, which can be unsightly, harm fish, and degrade water quality. Severe storms increase the amount of pollutants that run off from land to water, so the risk of algal blooms will be greater if storms become more severe. Increasingly severe storms could also cause sewers to overflow into lakes or rivers more often, threatening beach safety and drinking water supplies".

== Ecosystems ==
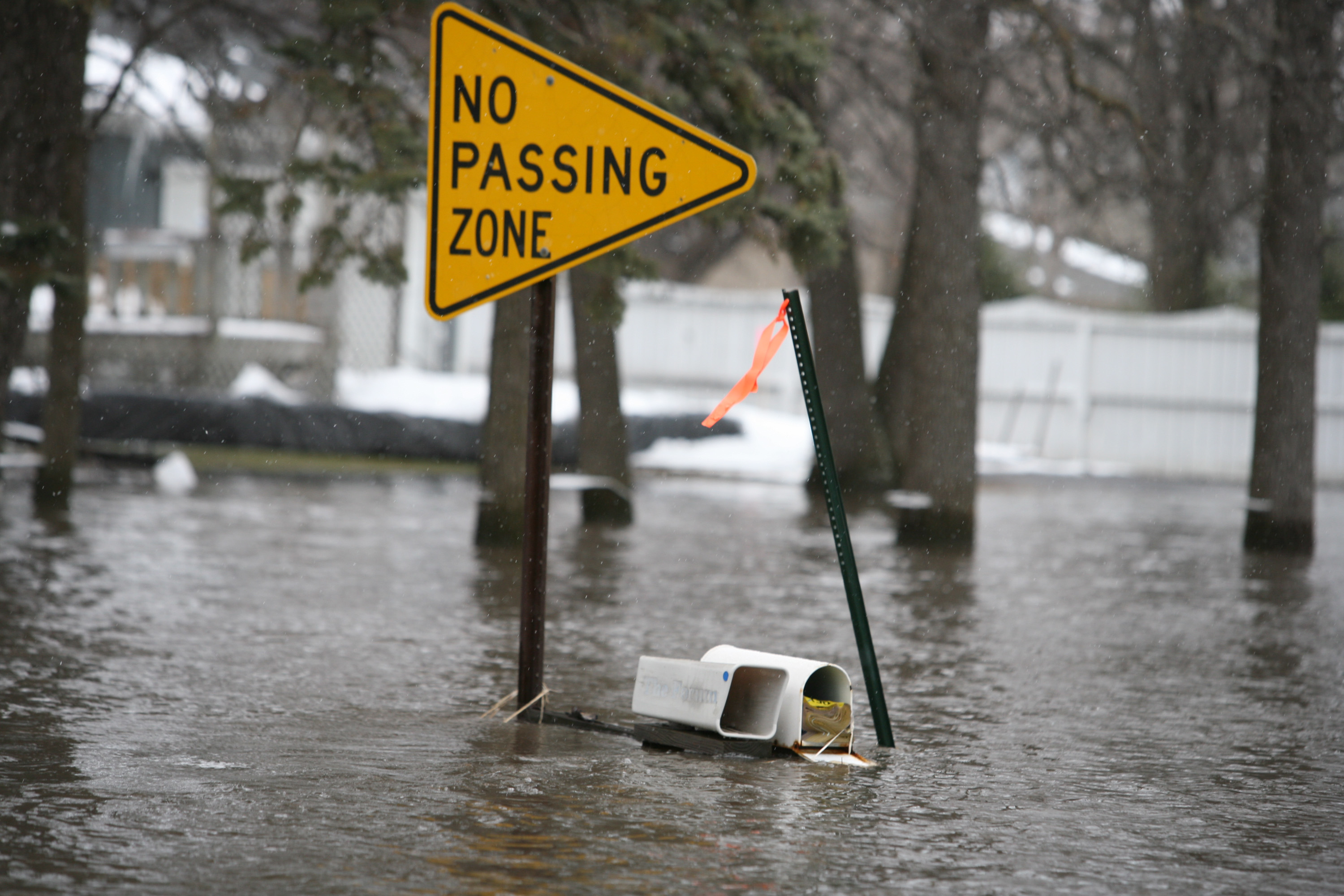
Red River flood, 2009

"The ranges of plants and animals are likely to shift as the climate changes. For example, warmer weather could change the composition of Minnesota’s forests. As the climate warms, the populations of paper birch, quaking aspen, balsam fir, and black spruce trees may decline in the North Woods, while oak, hickory, and pine trees may become more numerous. Climate change will also transform fish habitat. Rising water temperatures will increase the available habitat for warmwater fish such as bass, while shrinking the available habitat for coldwater fish such as trout. Declining ice cover and increasingly severe storms would harm both types of fish habitat through erosion and flooding".

"Warming could also harm ecosystems by changing the timing of natural processes such as migration, reproduction, and flower blooming. Migratory birds are arriving in Minnesota earlier in spring today than 40 years ago. Along with range shifts, changes in timing can disrupt the intricate web of relationships between animals and their food sources and between plants and pollinators. Because not all species adjust to climate change in the same way, the food that one species eats may no longer be available when that species needs it (for example, when migrating birds arrive). Some types of animals may no longer be able to find enough food".

== Winter recreation ==
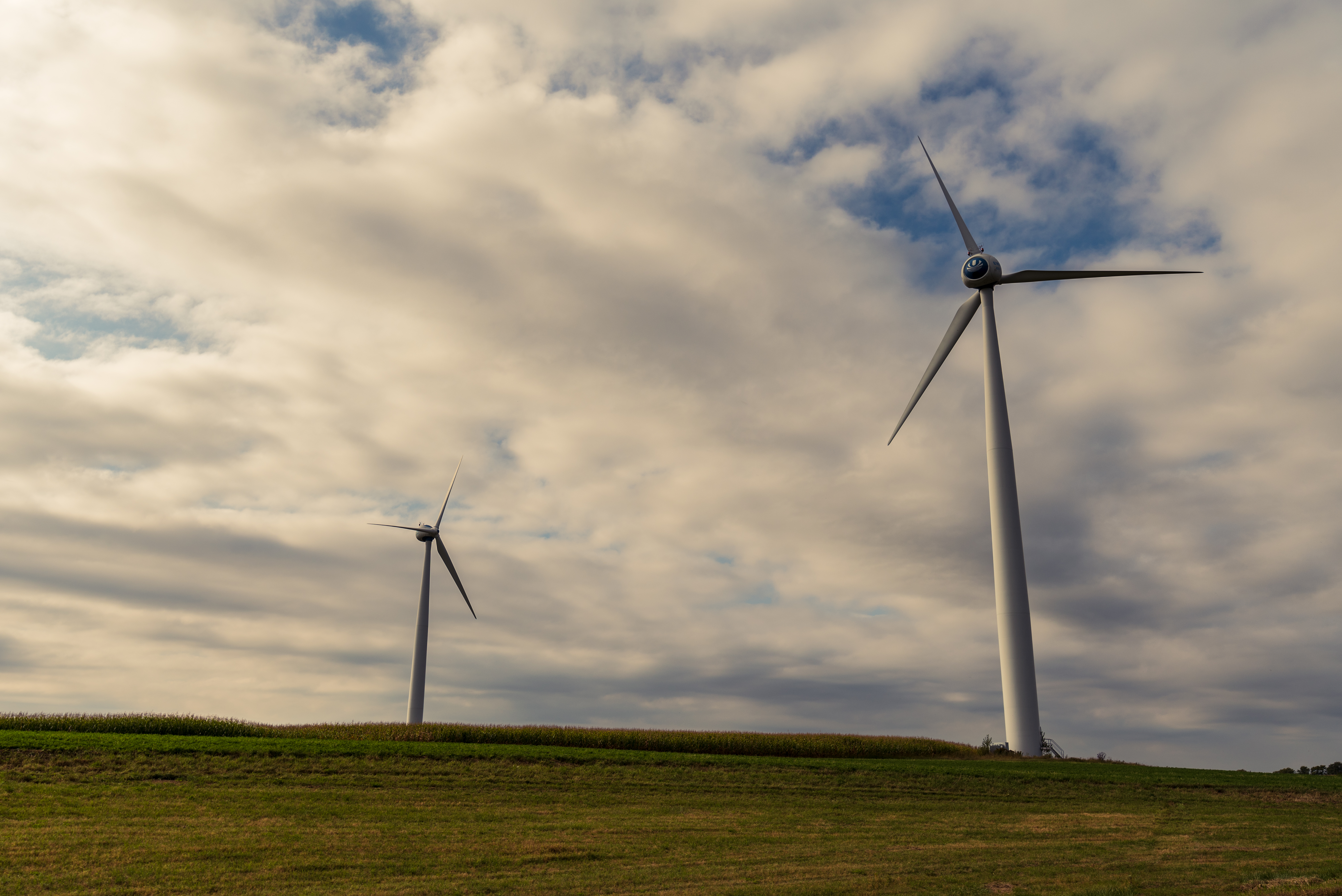
Wind turbines, Altura

"Warmer winters are likely to shorten the season for recreational activities like ice fishing, snowmobiling, skiing, and snowboarding, which could harm the local economies that depend on them. Small lakes are freezing later and thawing earlier than a century ago, which shortens the season for ice fishing and ice skating. Since the early 1970s, winter ice coverage in the Great Lakes has decreased by 63 percent. Warmer temperatures are likely to shorten the season when the ground is covered by snow, and thereby shorten the season for activities that take place on snow. Nevertheless, annual snowfall has increased in much of the Great Lakes region, which could benefit winter recreation at certain times and locations".

Warmer winters and lack of snow have put dogsledding at risk, including John Beargrease Dog Sled Race, which has been re-routed and shortened by 70 miles due to lack of snow.

== Agriculture ==
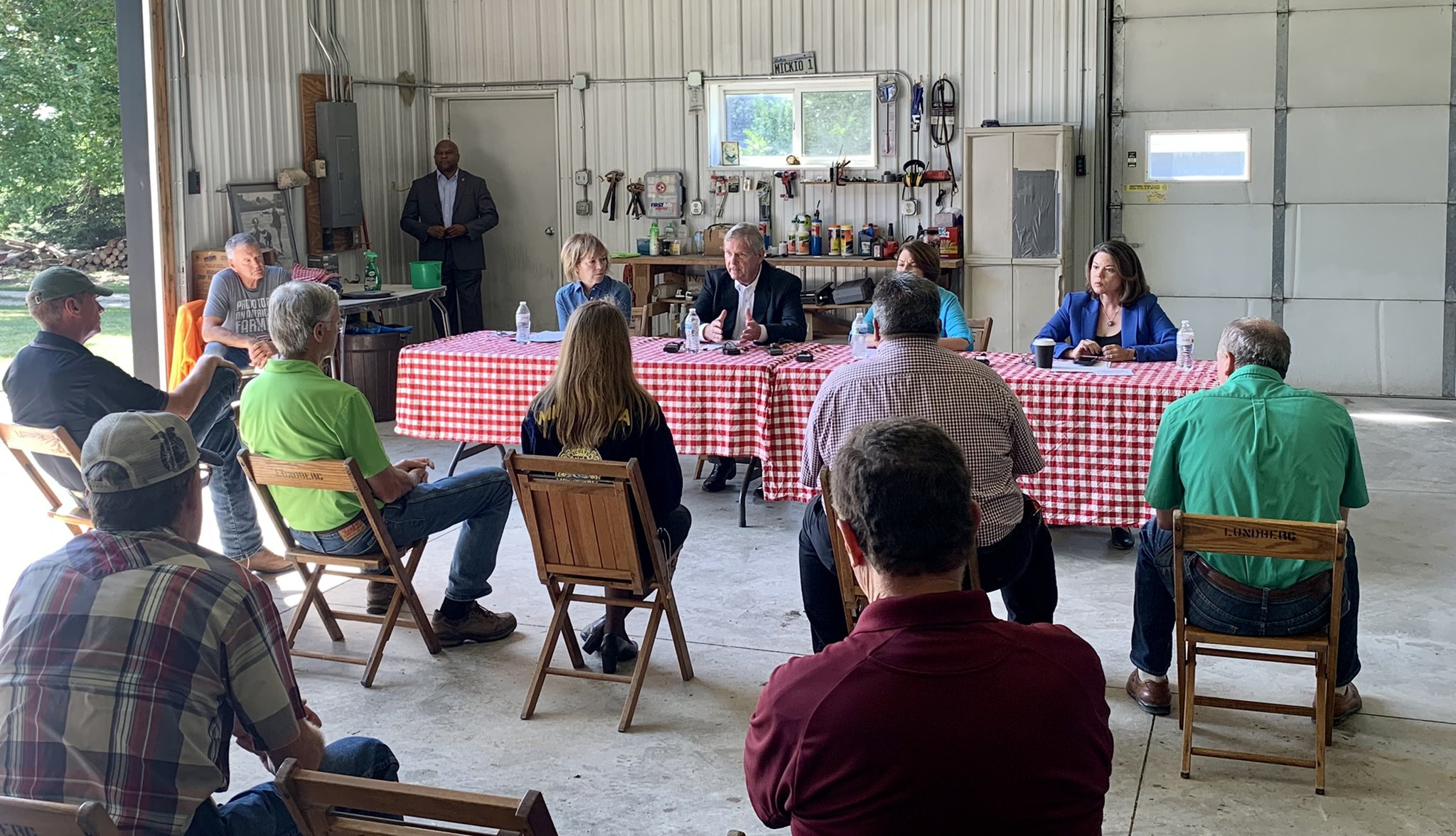
Tom Vilsack, Amy Klobuchar and Angie Craig with farmers at a meeting on drought relief, August 2021

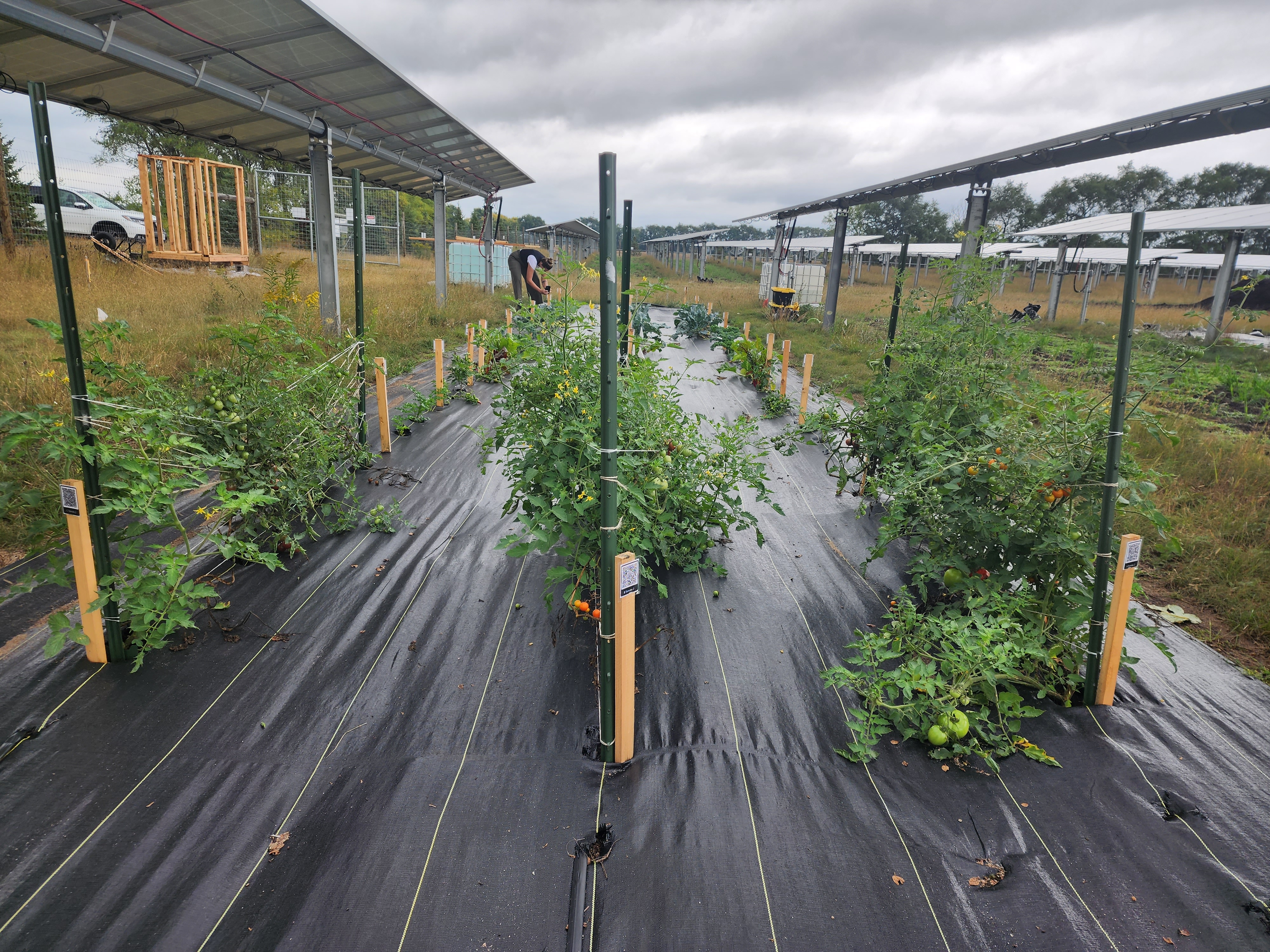
Colocated solar panels and tomato farm, Marine on St. Croix

"Changing the climate is likely to have both positive and negative effects on agriculture in Minnesota. Warmer weather has extended the growing season by about 15 days since the beginning of the 20th century. Longer frost-free growing seasons and higher concentrations of atmospheric carbon dioxide would increase yields of soybeans and wheat during an average year. But increasingly hot summers may reduce yields of corn. In seventy years, southern Minnesota is likely to have 5 to 15 more days per year with temperatures above 95°F than it has today. More severe droughts or floods would also hurt crop yields".

== Air pollution and human health ==
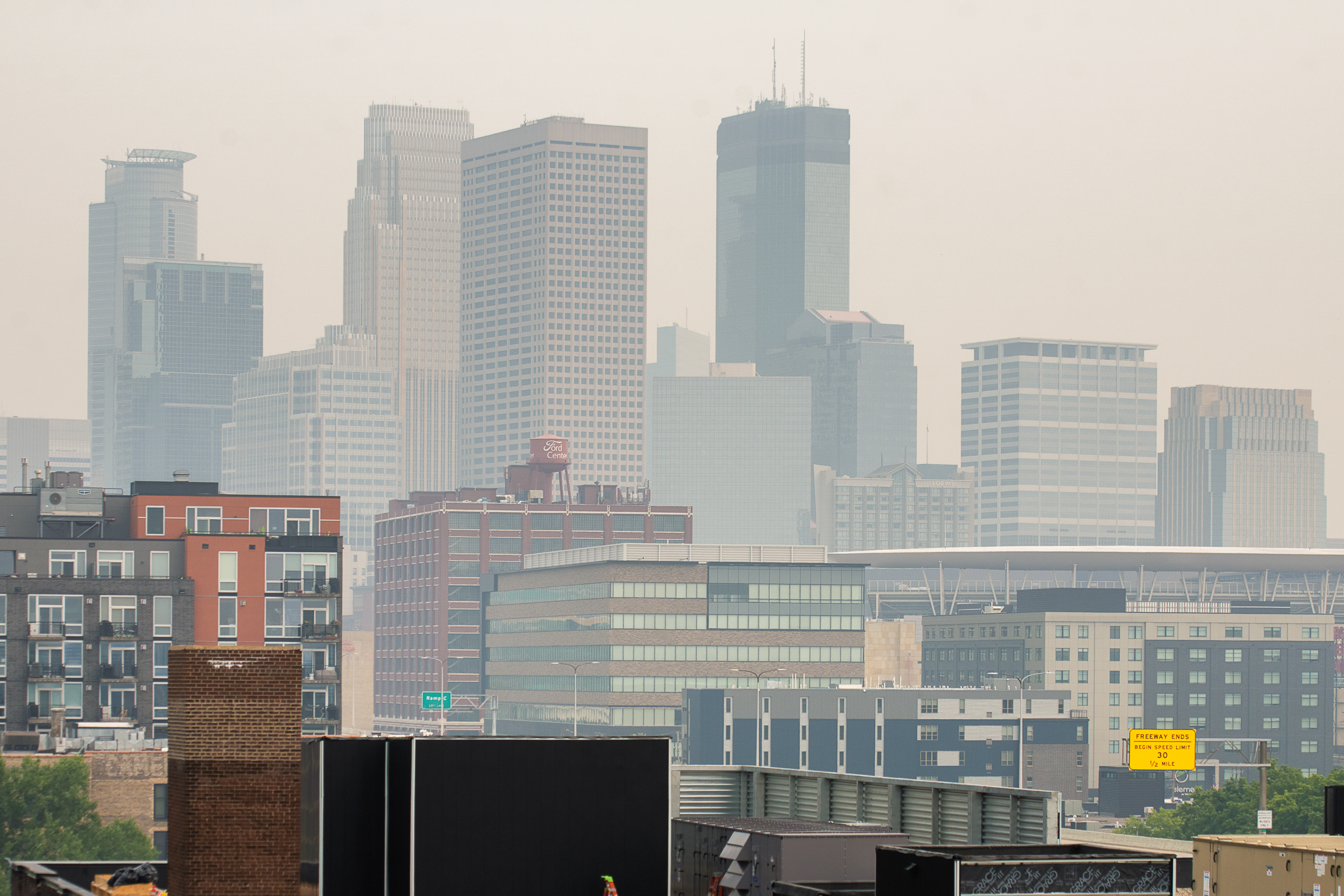
Minneapolis skyline obscured by smoke from Canadian wildfires, 2021

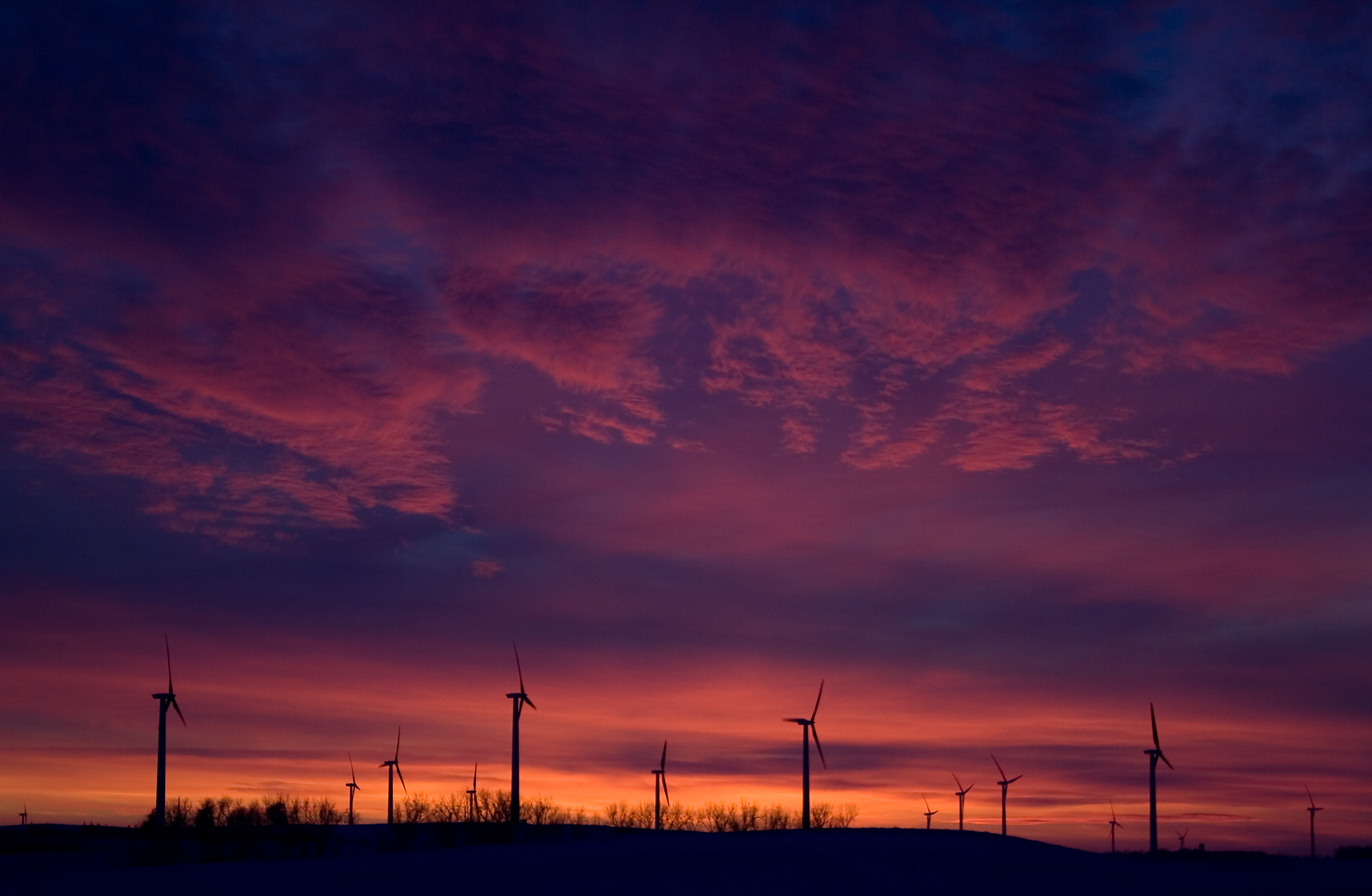
Buffalo Ridge Wind Farm

"Changing the climate can harm air quality and amplify existing threats to human health. Higher temperatures increase the formation of ground-level ozone, a pollutant that causes lung and heart problems. Ozone also harms plants. In some rural parts of Minnesota, ozone levels are high enough to reduce yields of soybeans and winter wheat. EPA and the Minnesota Pollution Control Agency have been working to reduce ozone concentrations. As the climate changes, continued progress toward clean air will become more difficult. Climate change may also increase the length and severity of the pollen season for allergy sufferers. For example, the ragweed season in Minneapolis is 21 days longer than in 1995, because the first frost in fall is later".

Both the EPA and MPR noted that the increased risk of insect-borne diseases, and specifically that "[t]he ticks that transmit Lyme disease are active when temperatures are above 45°F, so warmer winters could lengthen the season during which ticks can become infected or people can be exposed to the ticks".

== See also ==
- Plug-in electric vehicles in Minnesota
