= Two Harbors station =

- Duluth and Iron Range Railroad Company Depot
- U.S. National Register of Historic Places
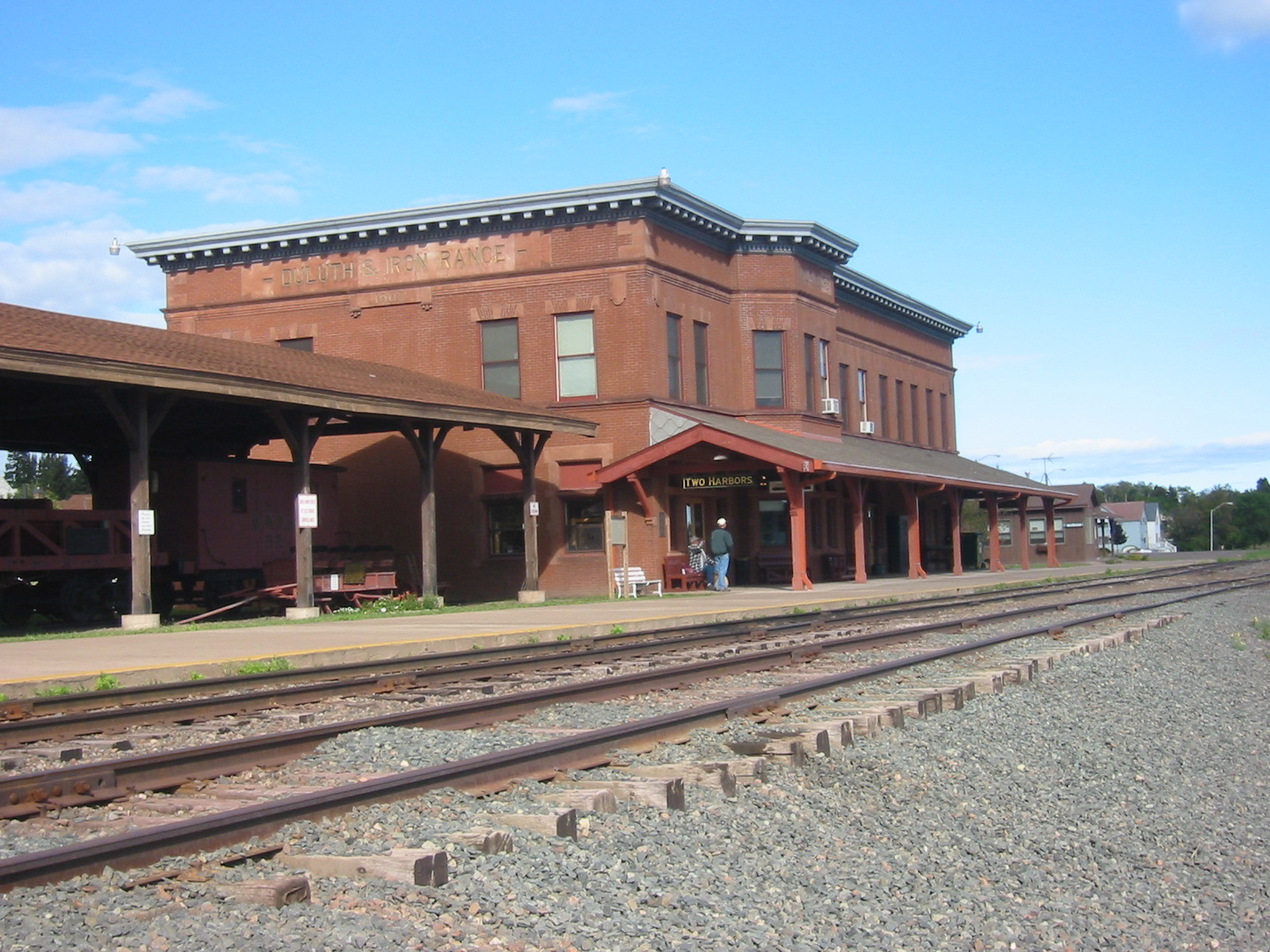

- Location within Minnesota Location within the United States
- Location: 6th St. off South Ave., Two Harbors, Minnesota
- Coordinates: 47°1′8″N 91°40′12.5″W
- Area: less than one acre
- Built: 1907
- Architect: Peter Olson
- NRHP reference No.: 83000910
- Added to NRHP: February 24, 1983

Two Harbors station is a historic train station located on Sixth Street in Two Harbors, Minnesota. The station was built in 1907. The large two-story depot was the third depot on the site. The Minnesota Iron Company developed the Duluth and Iron Range Railroad in 1883, laid out the town of Two Harbors in 1885, and built depots to conducts its business. When the rail line was completed to Duluth, it was used as a transfer point for passengers, lumber, and mining supplies. When passenger service ended in 1961, the depot was donated to Lake County. The building was listed on the National Register of Historic Places in 1983 as the Duluth and Iron Range Railroad Company Depot.

== Lake County Historical Society Depot Museum ==
The Lake County Historical Society now uses the building as the Lake County Historical Society Depot Museum. Exhibits focus on the pioneer history of Lake County. Displays include early Native Americans, local mining and logging industries, the railroad, military service, children's toys and dolls, butterflies, and local personal collections.
