= Can-Am Crown International Sled Dog Race =

Annual international event in Fort Kent, Maine, US

- Date: Early March
- Location: Fort Kent, Maine, United States
- Website: can-am-crown.net

The Can-Am Crown is an international sled dog race held annually in Fort Kent, Maine, and it usually takes place the first Saturday in March (which is also the day the Iditarod Trail begins). It is run by the Can-Am Crown organization, which was founded on October 16, 1992, as a non-profit corporation for the purpose of establishing a long-distance sled dog race.

== History ==
The first Can-Am Crown 250-mile race began on Tuesday, February 16, 1993. Nine teams from Maine, Ontario, Quebec, and New Brunswick competed in that race. In 1994 sixteen teams competed in the 250-mile race and eleven in the newly introduced 60-mile race. In 1997 a 30-mile race was added to the itinerary. That same year, the first Saturday in March was established as the official start date for all three races.

The directors set a limit of 30 teams in each race due to the popularity the races had gained. The limit was reached in 2005.

The 2021 race was cancelled due to the COVID-19 pandemic and the 2024 race was cancelled due to warm temperatures and associated poor snow conditions.

== Race ==
The race begins on Main Street in Fort Kent, sloping underneath the international bridge to Canada, then extending into the western parts of the Allagash wilderness, and finishes back in Fort Kent. Three races are part of the CAN-AM Crown, consisting of a 30-mile, 60 mile, and an Iditarod qualifying 250 mile race. Competitors travel from throughout the United States and Canada to compete in the sled dog race.

The 250-mile race course contains five checkpoints. All teams are required to sign in and sign out of each checkpoint. Normally the 30 and 60 mile race finish on the same day as they started, whereas the 250 mile race extends from 2–4 days. Mushers must reach the Allagash checkpoint by a specified date in order to complete the race.

== Prizes ==
The winner of the Can-Am 250 receives $29,000. The winner of the Can-Am 60 gets $7,000 and the winner of the Can-Am 30 receives $4,000. Minnesota musher Ryan Anderson won the 250 mile race in 2012, completing the trail in 31 hours, 22 minutes and 16 seconds.
