= August Omtvedt =

American politician (1881–1953)

August Omtvedt (August 31, 1881 – November 25, 1953) was an American businessman and politician.

Omtvedt was born on a farm in Telemark, Norway, and emigrated to the United States. He settled in Two Harbors, Lake County, Minnesota in 1901 with his wife and family. Omtvedt was a merchant and was the owner of a retail store. Omtvedt served as the mayor, the clerk of Two Harbors and on its city council. He also served on the Lake County Commission and was the chair of the county commission. Omtvelt served in the Minnesota House of Representatives in 1937 and 1938 and in 1941 and 1942. He died at St. Luke's Hospital in Duluth, Minnesota. Both the funeral and burial took place in Two Harbors.
