= John Dwan Office Building =

- U.S. National Register of Historic Places
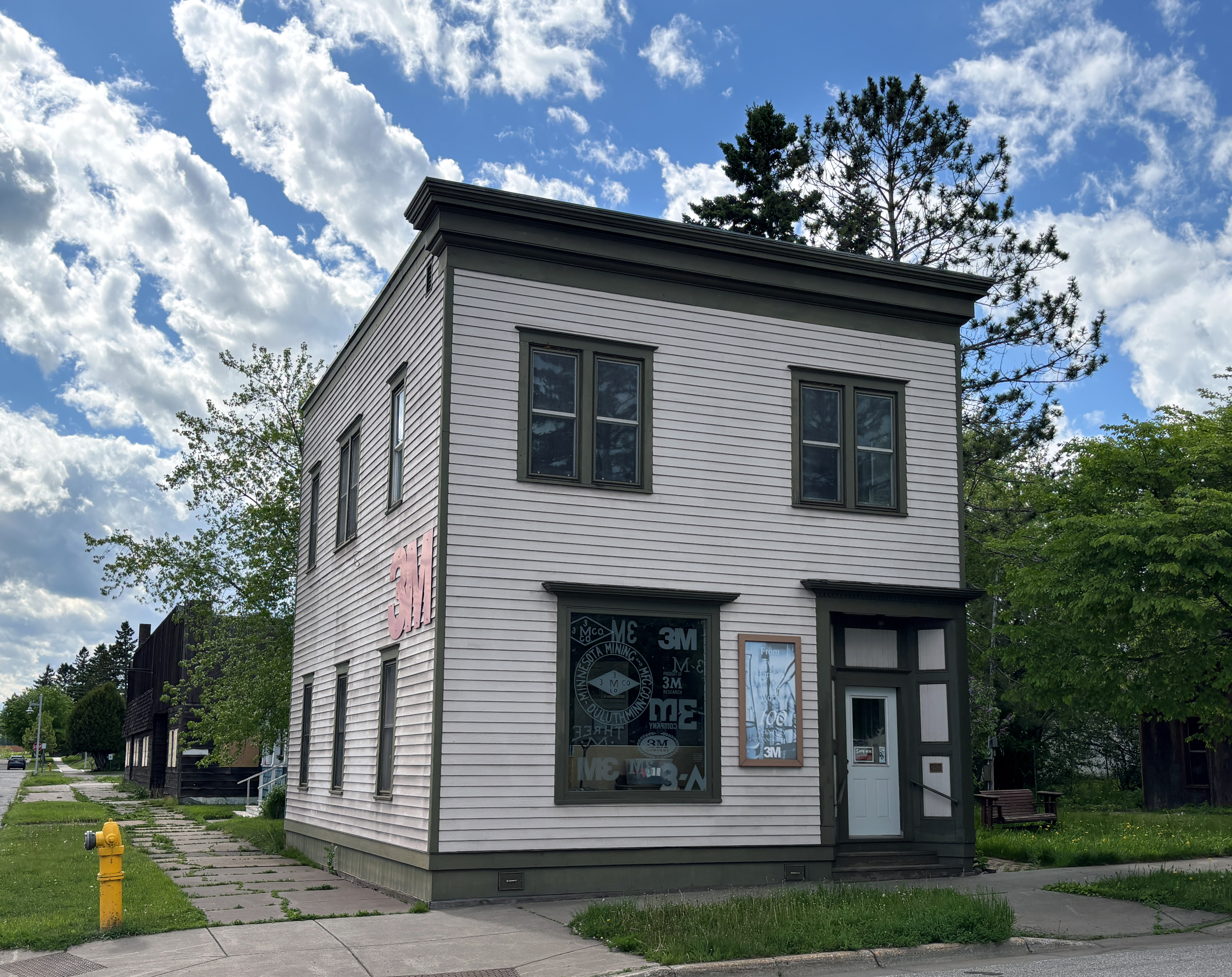
- The John Dwan Office Building from the southeast

- Location within Minnesota Location within the United States
- Location: Two Harbors, Minnesota
- Coordinates: 47°1′15.3″N 91°40′16.5″W
- Area: less than one acre
- Built: 1898
- NRHP reference No.: 92000700
- Added to NRHP: June 11, 1992

The John Dwan Office Building, located at 201 Waterfront Drive in Two Harbors, Minnesota, United States, is a historical building in which the 3M Company was founded and which now holds the 3M Birthplace Museum.

== History ==
The building was the location where John Dwan, a Two Harbors attorney drew up the incorporation papers for the Minnesota Mining and Manufacturing Company (now 3M) in 1902. The new company's vision was to mine and process corundum that the founders believed was plentiful on Lake Superior's north shore. The company nearly went bankrupt, because the mineral they were mining was useless as an abrasive and the high humidity at Lake Superior wreaked havoc with their adhesive process. Nevertheless, the company survived by receiving financial support from Lucius Pond Ordway, moving to Saint Paul, and changing its focus to manufacturing of abrasives with imported materials.

== 3M Birthplace Museum ==
The 3M Birthplace Museum, also known as the 3M Museum run by the Lake County Historical Society, features exhibits on the company's beginnings as the Minnesota Mining and Manufacturing Company, its early products such as sandpaper and Scotch Tape, and its later innovations such as Post-it Notes and Scotchgard. The museum also includes a recreated attorney's office from the early 1900s, a history of the company with photos, artifacts, and documents, and a laboratory exhibit. It also features a recreation display of an early lab, typical of 3M research and development work. Visitors can also do hands-on interactive programs and learn about the latest technology applications. The 3M Company has provided over $100,000 in grants for renovation work to the building.

== See also ==
- List of museums in Minnesota
