= Two Harbors, Minnesota =

City in Minnesota, United States

- City
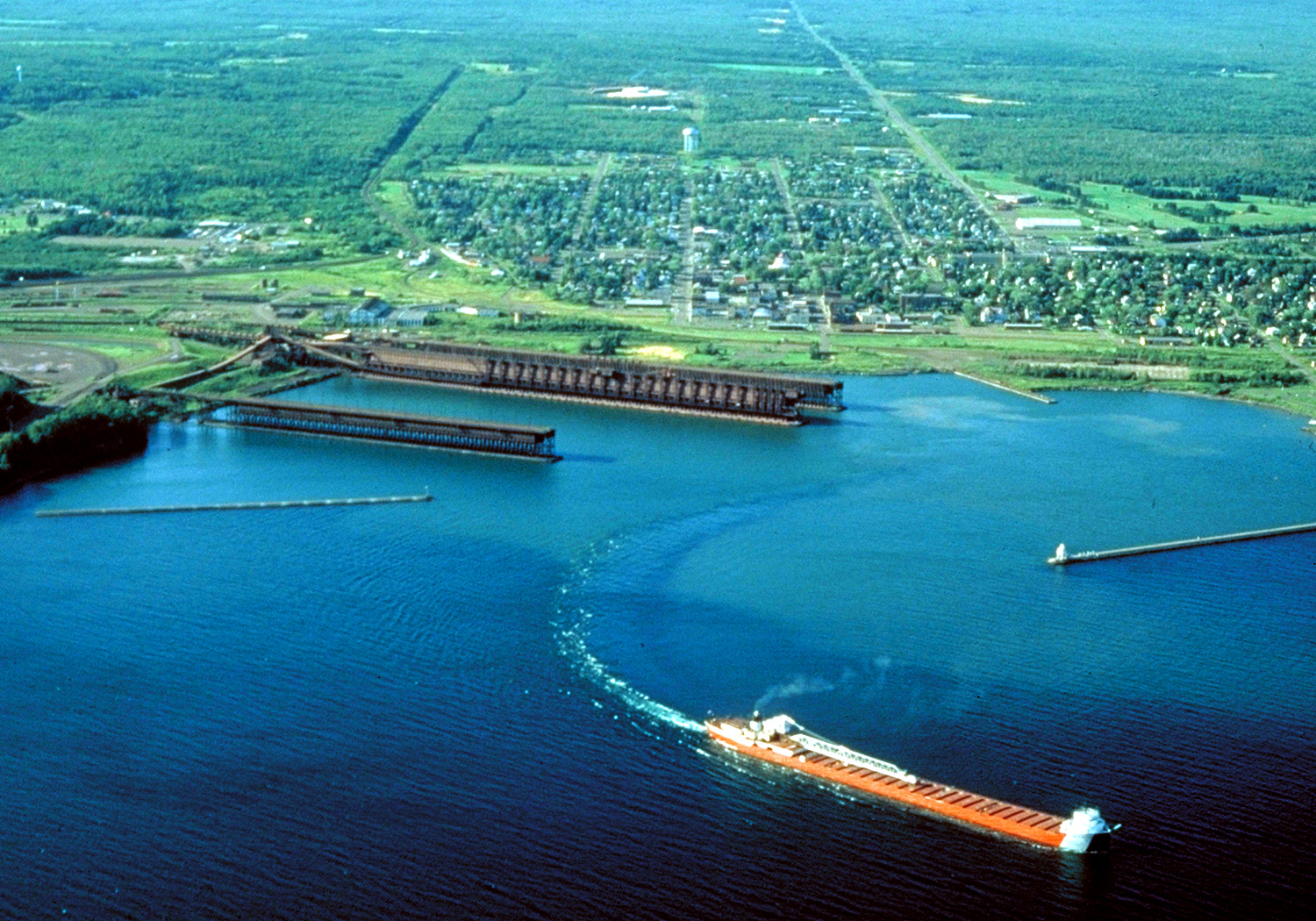
- Aerial view of Two Harbors. Exact photo date unknown, but appears to be from the mid-late 1990s.

- Seal

- Location of the city of Two Harbors within Lake County, Minnesota

- Location within the United States
- Coordinates: 47°1′31″N 91°40′26″W
- Country: United States
- State: Minnesota
- County: Lake
- Platted: 1885
- Incorporated (village): 1888
- Incorporated (city): February 26, 1907

Government
  - Mayor: Lew Conner

Area
  - Total: 3.28 sq mi (8.50 km^{2})
  - Land: 3.27 sq mi (8.48 km^{2})
  - Water: 0.0077 sq mi (0.02 km^{2})
- Elevation: 673 ft (205 m)

Population (2020)
  - Total: 3,633
  - Estimate (2022): 3,585
  - Density: 1,110.0/sq mi (428.58/km^{2})
- Time zone: UTC-6 (Central (CST))
  - Summer (DST): UTC-5 (CDT)
- ZIP code: 55616
- Area code: 218
- FIPS code: 27-65956
- GNIS feature ID: 0658799
- Website: twoharborsmn.gov

Two Harbors is a city and the county seat of Lake County, Minnesota, United States, along the shore of Lake Superior. The population was 3,633 at the 2020 census. Minnesota State Highway 61 serves as a main route in Two Harbors. Gooseberry Falls State Park is 13 miles (21 km) to the northeast. The city is home to a cargo shipping port for mined iron ore.

== History ==
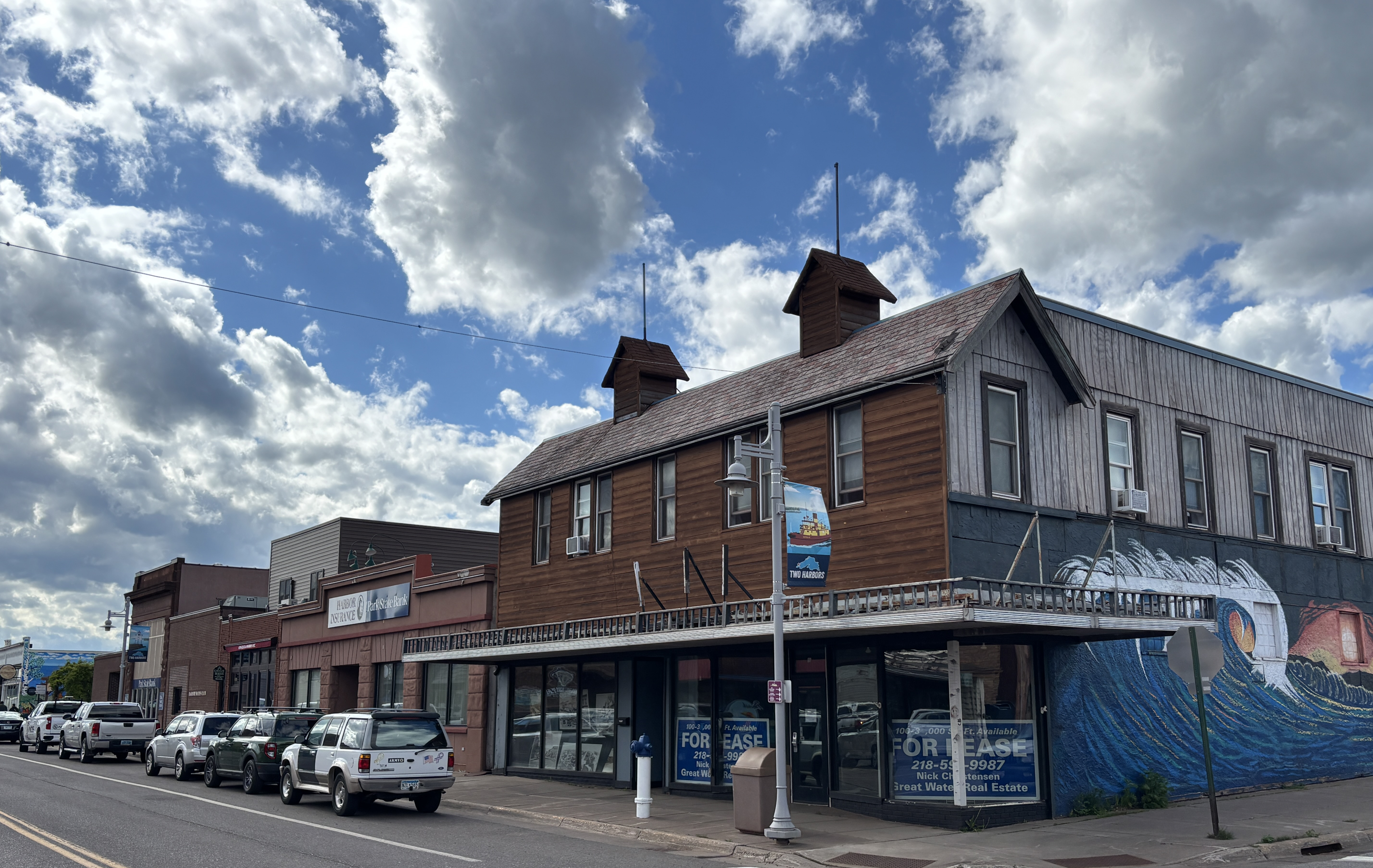
Storefronts along First Avenue

In the early years, Two Harbors consisted of two separate communities, Agate Bay and Burlington. The village of Burlington along Burlington Bay was platted in 1856 and first incorporated on May 23, 1857; it had a post office that operated from 1856 until 1862. The first residence constructed in Agate Bay was owned by Thomas Sexton (1854); it was a 14-by-16-foot shack. Early settlers lived in primitive conditions, common for both the area and time. Their homes were made of logs and had dirt floors. Their diet often consisted of homegrown vegetables and animals caught in the area (at that time there were many dense forests, so deer meat was not an abundant food source). The village of Agate Bay was founded as a construction camp when work on the new railroad began in 1883. The village of Two Harbors was platted in 1885 but not incorporated until 1888. Early transportation to the village was by boats under contract with the new Duluth and Iron Range Railroad, and by horse. It took one day to get from Duluth to Two Harbors. By 1886, the D&IR completed the Lake Division connecting Duluth and Two Harbors with passenger service that extended to Ely. Thirty-five logging camps were set up within the vicinity, one of them on Fourth Avenue. On February 26, 1907, the village reincorporated as the City of Two Harbors. The town's history is included in the Lake County Historical Depot Museum.

=== Whiskey Row ===
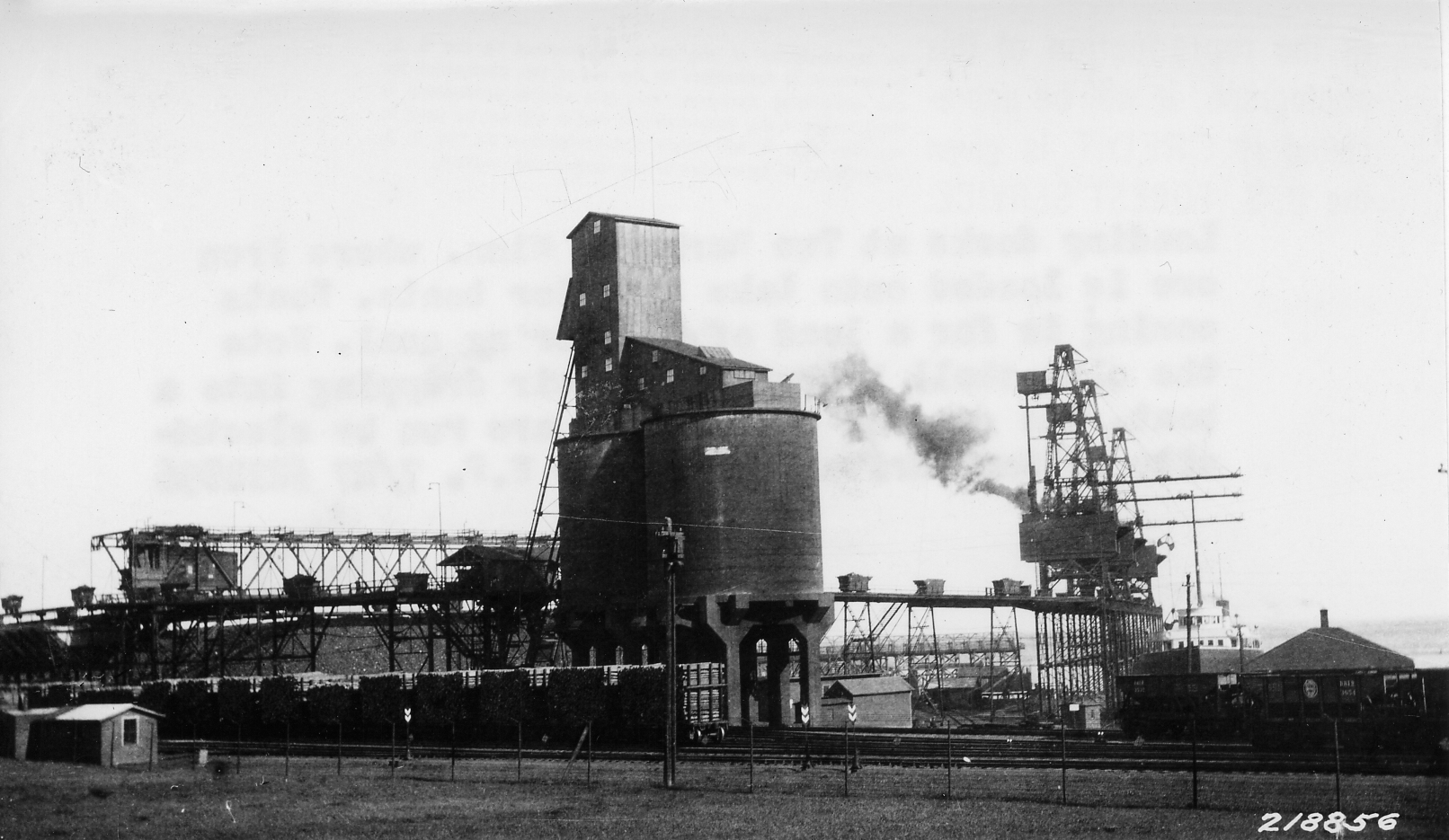
Loading docks at Two Harbors, 1927

By 1883, the Minnesota Iron Company had purchased all but four acres of Thomas Sexton's land around Agate Bay. Sexton leased his remaining four acres to merchants seeking to capitalize on the 600-man workforce arriving to build the Duluth & Iron Range Railroad. He divided his four acres into 32 lots. As with any frontier town of the day, it was a largely male population. The infamous four-acre plot earned the nickname "Whiskey Row" and was said to exist for the sole purpose of "relieving a man of his pay."

Contrary to popular myth, Whiskey Row was not destroyed by a fire in 1888. There was a fire, but it occurred before the first load of ore arrived in July, 1884; only seven buildings were damaged. It was reported that the merchants affected were in Duluth the next day purchasing materials to rebuild. Whiskey Row's demise occurred the following year.

The railroad rapidly expanded its rail and shipping operations and needed all of the shoreline for its new coal handling and storage facility. By 1885, the Minnesota Iron Company convinced Sexton to sell his remaining four acres along Agate Bay. The railroad then evicted the tenants and moved any of the salvageable buildings inland. There are several homes in "east" Two Harbors whose original structures were on Whiskey Row.

=== Railroad ===
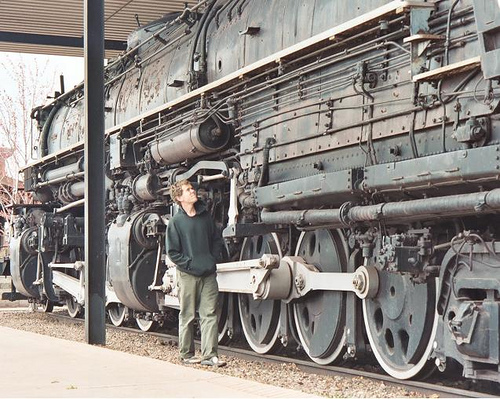
Duluth, Missabe & Iron Range Railway 2-8-8-4 "Yellowstone" preserved at Two Harbors station

Had it not been for the discovery of iron ore nearby, Two Harbors would not exist. The Minnesota Iron Company bought 17,000 acres (69 km^{2}) of land in order to build their railroad. In Agate Bay (Two Harbors), most of the land was bought from Sexton, who by that time had owned the land for 20 years.

Various locations were considered for the railroad terminus and shipping port, but Agate Bay was chosen because it was closer to the iron ore site and had a clay bottom bay, while most others were rocky.

As the track was being developed, the main transportation route was Lake Superior. This proved difficult when heavy loads such as railroad engines nearly sank the scows or tugs that carried them. The contractor John. S. Wolfe was told he would receive a bonus of $50,000 if the railroad was completed by August 1, 1884. Because that was a Friday, and construction workers had strong superstitions about Fridays, it became important that the construction be completed by July 31. On that day, the first iron ore cars left Agate Bay early in the morning, along with a caboose for President Tower to ride in on the return trip. The railway between Duluth and Two Harbors was completed in 1886.

The North Shore Scenic Railroad operates a six-hour excursion starting in Duluth that has a two-hour break in Two Harbors.

A 2-6-0 Mogul class steam locomotive with the first style of ore cars and caboose is on display by the historic Duluth and Iron Range depot.

A 2-8-8-4 Yellowstone class steam locomotive is on display at Two Harbors. It ranks among the largest steam locomotives ever built.

In the 1970s, as a part of the Minnesotan back-to-the-land movement, lesbian feminists began renting a cabin outside of Two Harbors which they called "Molly’s Cabin". The building served as a local lesbian community hub until 1981, when it burned down due to a propane refrigerator fire.

=== Mayoral recall ===
In 2022, incumbent mayor Chris Swanson was recalled; over 86% of voters voted to remove him after a series of controversies. City Council President Ben Redden took over the mayor's duties pending a special election to choose a replacement.

== Geography ==
According to the United States Census Bureau, the city has a total area of 3.30 square miles (8.55 km^{2}), all land.

=== Climate ===
Two Harbors is 20 miles northeast of the city of Duluth. It is along Lake Superior, which contributes the two natural harbors for which Two Harbors is named, Burlington Bay and Agate Bay. The warmest month in the year is July, the coldest January. The record high temperature was 99 °F (37 °C) in 1948, the record low −36 °F (−38 °C) in 1996. According to the Minnesota Department of Natural Resources (DNR), Two Harbors is in a region called the Laurentian Mixed Forest Province, which contains broad areas of coniferous forest, mixed hardwood, and conifer bogs and swamps. The region averages 21 to 32 inches (810 mm) of precipitation per year and has an average temperature of 34 to 40 °F (4 °C).

Climate data for Two Harbors, Minnesota (1991–2020 normals, extremes 1894–present)
Month	Jan	Feb	Mar	Apr	May	Jun	Jul	Aug	Sep	Oct	Nov	Dec	Year
Record high °F (°C)	57 (14)	59 (15)	75 (24)	88 (31)	94 (34)	98 (37)	99 (37)	99 (37)	92 (33)	86 (30)	70 (21)	62 (17)	99 (37)
Mean daily maximum °F (°C)	23.7 (−4.6)	27.8 (−2.3)	36.9 (2.7)	47.6 (8.7)	58.1 (14.5)	67.0 (19.4)	75.1 (23.9)	74.5 (23.6)	66.8 (19.3)	53.9 (12.2)	40.0 (4.4)	28.5 (−1.9)	50.0 (10.0)
Daily mean °F (°C)	15.6 (−9.1)	19.0 (−7.2)	28.7 (−1.8)	39.1 (3.9)	48.4 (9.1)	56.3 (13.5)	64.8 (18.2)	65.3 (18.5)	57.8 (14.3)	45.9 (7.7)	33.0 (0.6)	21.4 (−5.9)	41.3 (5.2)
Mean daily minimum °F (°C)	7.4 (−13.7)	10.1 (−12.2)	20.5 (−6.4)	30.7 (−0.7)	38.6 (3.7)	45.7 (7.6)	54.5 (12.5)	56.0 (13.3)	48.8 (9.3)	37.9 (3.3)	26.1 (−3.3)	14.2 (−9.9)	32.5 (0.3)
Record low °F (°C)	−36 (−38)	−36 (−38)	−28 (−33)	−15 (−26)	9 (−13)	29 (−2)	37 (3)	37 (3)	23 (−5)	0 (−18)	−18 (−28)	−33 (−36)	−36 (−38)
Average precipitation inches (mm)	1.04 (26)	1.16 (29)	1.51 (38)	2.65 (67)	3.30 (84)	4.23 (107)	4.05 (103)	3.48 (88)	3.53 (90)	3.03 (77)	2.18 (55)	1.56 (40)	31.72 (806)
Average snowfall inches (cm)	12.4 (31)	13.6 (35)	9.1 (23)	4.3 (11)	0.0 (0.0)	0.0 (0.0)	0.0 (0.0)	0.0 (0.0)	0.0 (0.0)	0.2 (0.51)	5.9 (15)	15.5 (39)	61.0 (155)
Average precipitation days (≥ 0.01 in)	10.1	8.5	8.6	9.9	12.6	13.4	11.8	10.5	11.7	11.5	9.1	9.8	127.5
Average snowy days (≥ 0.1 in)	8.2	6.5	4.2	1.7	0.0	0.0	0.0	0.0	0.0	0.1	2.6	7.2	30.5
Source: NOAA

Climate data for Two Harbors 7NW, Minnesota, 1991–2020 normals: 1355ft (413m)
Month	Jan	Feb	Mar	Apr	May	Jun	Jul	Aug	Sep	Oct	Nov	Dec	Year
Mean daily maximum °F (°C)	19.6 (−6.9)	25.3 (−3.7)	36.9 (2.7)	49.6 (9.8)	63.7 (17.6)	72.3 (22.4)	77.3 (25.2)	74.8 (23.8)	65.8 (18.8)	51.4 (10.8)	36.1 (2.3)	24.0 (−4.4)	49.7 (9.9)
Daily mean °F (°C)	10.3 (−12.1)	14.2 (−9.9)	26.0 (−3.3)	38.5 (3.6)	51.0 (10.6)	60.2 (15.7)	65.4 (18.6)	63.7 (17.6)	55.2 (12.9)	42.7 (5.9)	28.7 (−1.8)	16.1 (−8.8)	39.3 (4.1)
Mean daily minimum °F (°C)	1.1 (−17.2)	3.2 (−16.0)	15.0 (−9.4)	27.3 (−2.6)	38.3 (3.5)	48.1 (8.9)	53.5 (11.9)	52.6 (11.4)	44.6 (7.0)	34.1 (1.2)	21.2 (−6.0)	8.2 (−13.2)	28.9 (−1.7)
Average precipitation inches (mm)	1.25 (32)	1.26 (32)	1.69 (43)	2.90 (74)	3.45 (88)	4.52 (115)	3.67 (93)	3.65 (93)	3.68 (93)	3.27 (83)	2.30 (58)	1.97 (50)	33.61 (854)
Average snowfall inches (cm)	18.60 (47.2)	17.80 (45.2)	12.30 (31.2)	9.00 (22.9)	0.90 (2.3)	0.00 (0.00)	0.00 (0.00)	0.00 (0.00)	0.00 (0.00)	2.80 (7.1)	10.60 (26.9)	21.60 (54.9)	93.6 (237.7)
Source: NOAA

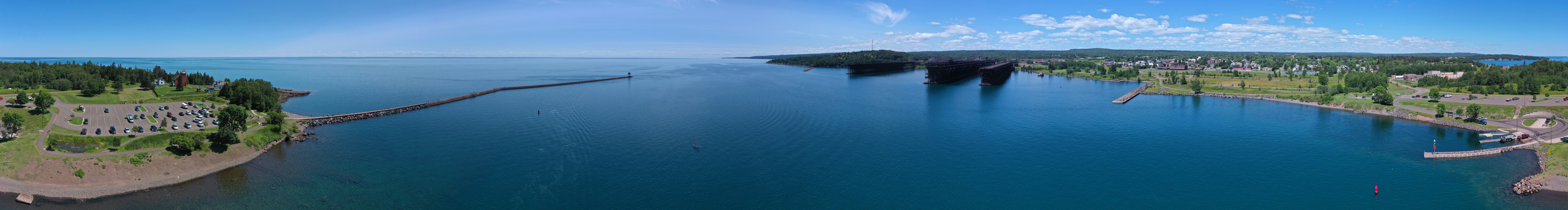
Agate Bay at Two Harbors

== Demographics ==
Historical population
Census	Pop.	Note	%±
1890	1,224		—
1900	3,278		167.8%
1910	4,990		52.2%
1920	4,546		−8.9%
1930	4,425		−2.7%
1940	4,046		−8.6%
1950	4,400		8.7%
1960	4,695		6.7%
1970	4,437		−5.5%
1980	4,039		−9.0%
1990	3,651		−9.6%
2000	3,613		−1.0%
2010	3,745		3.7%
2020	3,633		−3.0%
2022 (est.)	3,585		−1.3%
U.S. Decennial Census; 2020 Census

=== 2020 census ===
As of the 2020 census, Two Harbors had a population of 3,633. The median age was 42.5 years. 22.7% of residents were under the age of 18 and 24.4% of residents were 65 years of age or older. For every 100 females there were 94.5 males, and for every 100 females age 18 and over there were 89.8 males age 18 and over.

0.0% of residents lived in urban areas, while 100.0% lived in rural areas.

There were 1,588 households in Two Harbors, of which 27.5% had children under the age of 18 living in them. Of all households, 41.4% were married-couple households, 20.8% were households with a male householder and no spouse or partner present, and 30.7% were households with a female householder and no spouse or partner present. About 38.4% of all households were made up of individuals and 18.7% had someone living alone who was 65 years of age or older.

There were 1,750 housing units, of which 9.3% were vacant. The homeowner vacancy rate was 1.7% and the rental vacancy rate was 7.1%.

Racial composition as of the 2020 census
Race	Number	Percent
White	3,409	93.8%
Black or African American	7	0.2%
American Indian and Alaska Native	24	0.7%
Asian	18	0.5%
Native Hawaiian and Other Pacific Islander	0	0.0%
Some other race	11	0.3%
Two or more races	164	4.5%
Hispanic or Latino (of any race)	43	1.2%

=== 2010 census ===
As of the census of 2010, there were 3,745 people, 1,649 households, and 951 families residing in the city. The population density was 1,134.8 inhabitants per square mile (438.1/km^{2}). There were 1,799 housing units at an average density of 545.2 per square mile (210.5/km^{2}). The racial makeup of the city was 97.2% White, 0.2% African American, 0.6% Native American, 0.2% Asian, 0.2% from other races, and 1.5% from two or more races. Hispanic or Latino people of any race were 1.0% of the population.

There were 1,649 households, of which 27.0% had children under the age of 18 living with them, 43.5% were married couples living together, 10.6% had a female householder with no husband present, 3.6% had a male householder with no wife present, and 42.3% were non-families. 36.7% of all households were made up of individuals, and 17.4% had someone living alone who was 65 years of age or older. The average household size was 2.19 and the average family size was 2.85.

The median age in the city was 41.3 years. 22% of residents were under the age of 18; 8% were between the ages of 18 and 24; 23.9% were from 25 to 44; 25.1% were from 45 to 64; and 21.1% were 65 years of age or older. The gender makeup of the city was 47.4% male and 52.6% female.

=== 2000 census ===
As of the census of 2000, there were 3,613 people, 1,636 households, and 953 families residing in the city. The population density was 1,120.7 inhabitants per square mile (432.7/km^{2}). There were 1,631 housing units at an average density of 505.9 per square mile (195.3/km^{2}). The racial makeup of the city was 98.06% White, 0.06% African American, 0.66% Native American, 0.11% Asian, 0.08% from other races, and 1.02% from two or more races. Hispanic or Latino people of any race were 0.61% of the population. 19.4% were of Norwegian, 18.0% Swedish, 12.2% German, 9.6% Finnish, 8.0% Irish and 5.7% English ancestry.

There were 1,523 households, out of which 29.7% had children under the age of 18 living with them, 48.9% were married couples living together, 10.4% had a female householder with no husband present, and 37.4% were non-families. 32.0% of all households were made up of individuals, and 16.0% had someone living alone who was 65 years of age or older. The average household size was 2.27 and the average family size was 2.86.

In the city, the population was spread out, with 23.0% under the age of 18, 8.1% from 18 to 24, 24.8% from 25 to 44, 22.5% from 45 to 64, and 21.6% who were 65 years of age or older. The median age was 41 years. For every 100 females, there were 86.9 males. For every 100 females age 18 and over, there were 83.0 males.

The median income for a household in the city was $37,708, and the median income for a family was $47,113. Males had a median income of $39,712 versus $29,076 for females. The per capita income for the city was $19,793. About 7.2% of families and 9.5% of the population were below the poverty line, including 15.7% of those under age 18 and 4.3% of those age 65 or over.

== Industry ==
Granite Gear, started in 1986, produces heavy-duty backpacks for the military and outdoors.

=== Former industries ===
==== Cigar factories ====
In 1900, John H. Kallin built Two Harbors Cigar Factory on the 100 block of 7th Street. The local trade alone required about 30,000 cigars each month. They came in eight regular brands and five specialty. In 1907 Ed Sorenson built Sorenson Cigar Factory. Neither factory is still in operation.

==== Universal Fiberglass ====
In 1964 the abandoned DM&IR railroad buildings were used to open Universal Fiberglass. Producing three wheel mailsters for the United States Postal Service was their main contract, worth millions. Car fenders and like objects were also produced. When a fire caused enough damage that they could no longer fulfill their contract, the GSA shut them down. The property was sold at a public auction.

==== Bottling works ====
Two Harbors Bottling works began in 1912. It offered flavors of pop such as cream soda, ginger ale, cider, and seltzer water. The company became especially known for its strawberry pop's unique flavor—a creamier and more natural one than the rest. This business is no longer running.

==== 3M ====
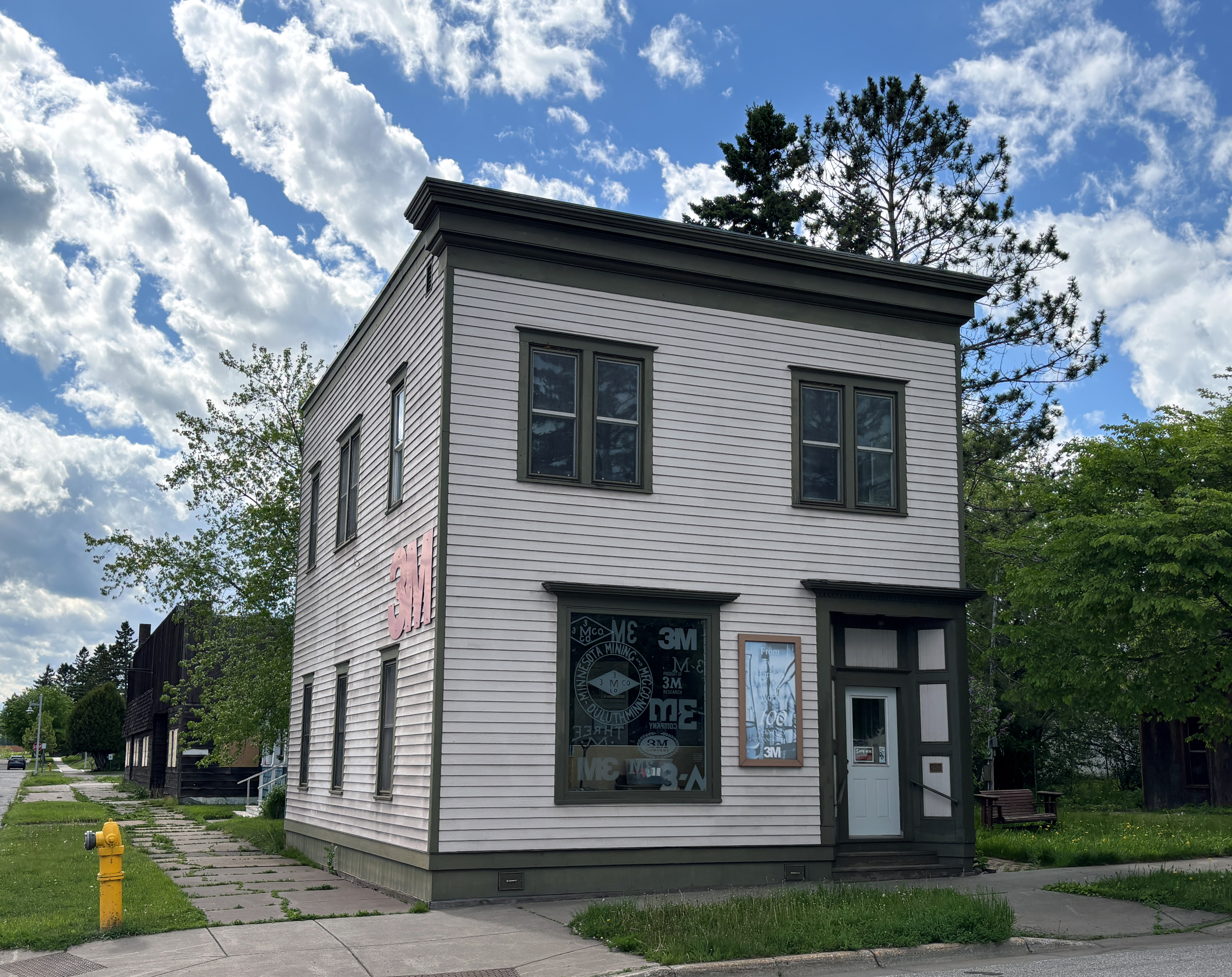
3M Museum

3M, originally known as Minnesota Mining and Manufacturing Company, was started by five men from Two Harbors. When the founders thought they had found a mineral called corundum, which could be used to make sandpaper, they began setting up a mining company. The five were Henry S. Bryan, J. Danley Budd, Herman Cable, William McGonagle, and John Dwan. To get the company started they erected a large dock, crushing mill and bunk and storage houses. After selling the corundum to a company in Chicago the men learned that it wasn't really corundum and moved on to other ventures. In 1905 the company was moved to Duluth and in 1907 to St. Paul. It still had ties in Two Harbors until Dwan's death. Now the only tie 3M has to Two Harbors is a museum in Dwan's original office. The museum is in 3M's original building. Exhibits include Dwan's recreated office and other artifacts; a history of the company including photos and documents; a "lab" area representing the establishment of research and development, product diversification and growth; and hands-on interactive programs and technology applications. The original office building has been restored and is listed on the National Register of Historic Places.

== Arts and culture ==
=== Edna G. ===
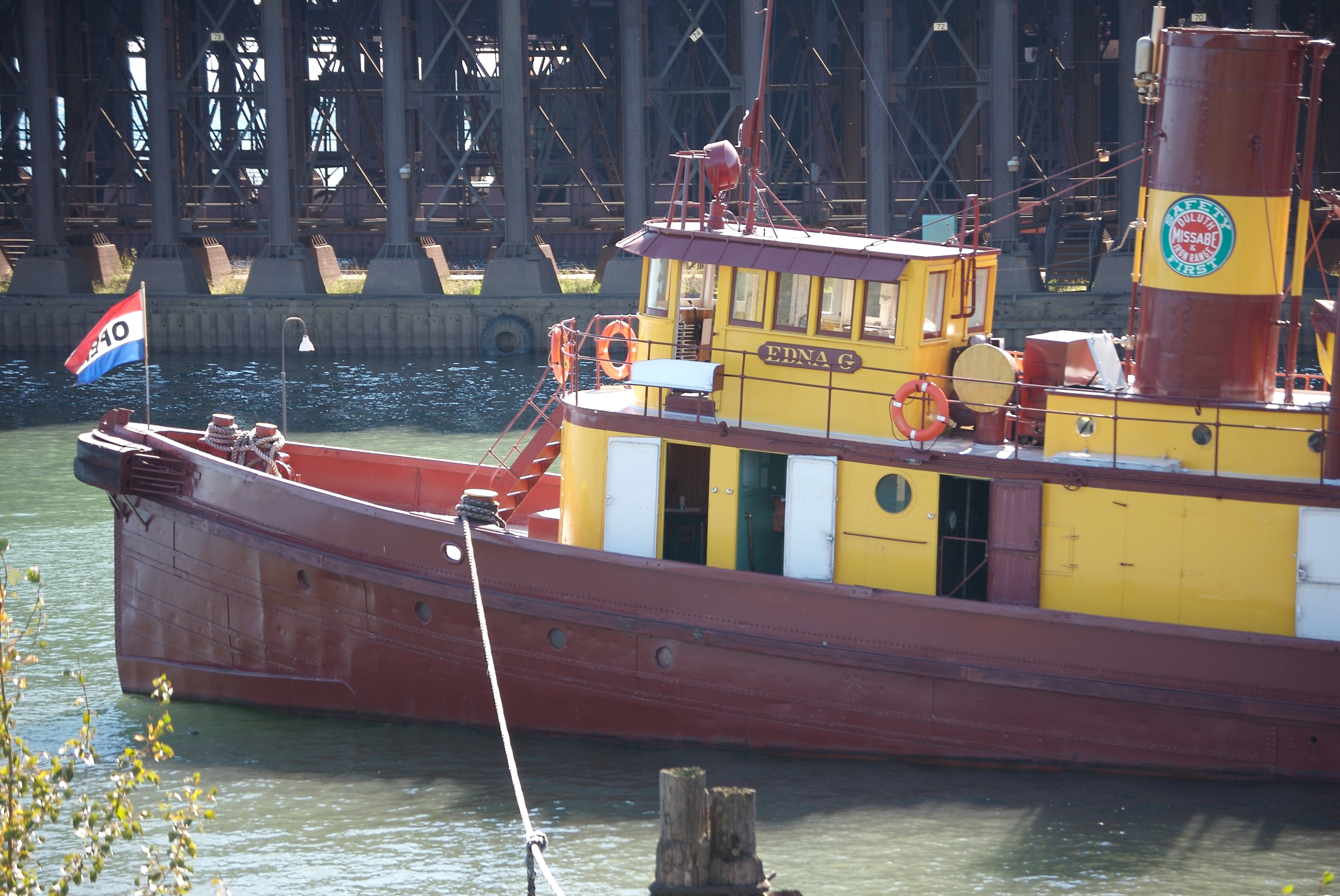
Edna G tugboat

Built in 1896, the Edna G. was named after the president of the railroad's daughter, Edna Greatsinger, this tug is "one of a kind". The Edna G. stayed in Two Harbors its entire working career except for a small stint during World War I it spent two years on the east coast moving warships around. Until its retirement in 1981, the Edna G. was the last coal-fired, steam-powered tugboat in operation of the Great Lakes. The boat is listed on the National Register of Historic Places. Tours of this vessel are available from trained guides in the spring-fall from 10am to 5pm. A trip includes a visit to the engine room, and seeing the pilot house, where the passengers are allowed to blow the horn.

=== John Beargrease ===
Mok-qua Bennete, also known as John Beargrease, was an Ojibwe man who delivered mail between Two Harbors and Grand Marais. The John Beargrease Dog Sled Race was started as a tribute to him for his role in the early history of the North Shore of Lake Superior. The race covers nearly 400 miles between Duluth and Grand Portage. It is traditionally held in the last week of January.

=== Other ===
Two Harbors hosts the Lake County Fair and Heritage Days, and is one of the checkpoints for the Beargrease Sled Dog Marathon, as well as the starting line for Grandma's Marathon and the NorthShore Inline Marathon. Dean L. Hovey wrote a mystery, Whistling Pines (2012), set in a fictional Two Harbors senior living center, and two sequels, Whistling Sousa (2013) and Whistling Wings (2018).

=== Library ===
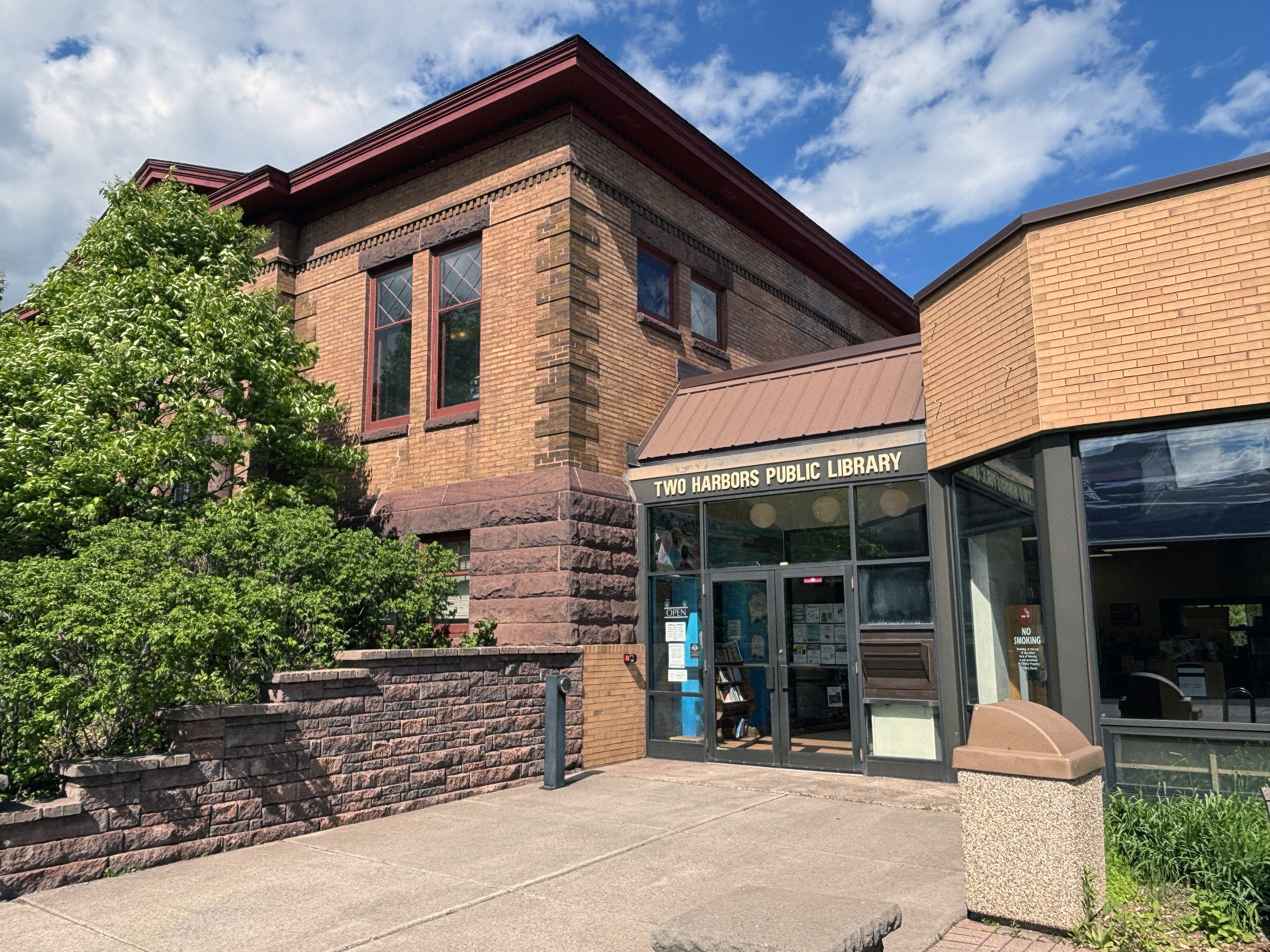
Two Harbors Public Library

The Two Harbors Public Library opened in 1909 as a Carnegie Library with a $15,000 grant from Andrew Carnegie. Before that, the books were shuffled from space to space in a variety of city offices. In 1983, an addition was added to the library, providing street access and a total of 8,000 square feet. The library houses over 30,000 books, magazines, CDs, audiobooks, and DVDs. The Archives Room contains photographic collections and local newspapers dating to the late 1890s. Residents of Two Harbors and the surrounding rural area are served by the library and, through the library's membership, the Arrowhead Library System.

== Parks and recreation ==
Two Harbors has five community parks. They have picnic tables, baseball, soccer, and football fields, and playground equipment. The Thomas Owens Park houses the city's bandshell, home of the Two Harbors City Band, Minnesota's oldest city band.

Two Harbors is the gateway city to the North Shore of Minnesota. Highway 61 is the only major highway heading north/northeast along Lake Superior's shore and is the fastest way to the North Shore's eight state parks, as well as wayside rests and lakeshore access. The parks are Gooseberry Falls, Split Rock Lighthouse, Tettegouche, George H. Crosby Manitou State Park, Temperance River State Park, Cascade River State Park, Judge C.R. Magney State Park, and Grand Portage State Park.

The Two Harbors area is host to numerous outdoor events each year, including the challenging Heck of the North gravel bike race.

=== Trails ===
Two Harbors offers access to Minnesota trails. The Sonju hiking trail can be used to view the Two Harbors shoreline. North Shore State Snowmobile Trail includes scenic views for snowmobilers, as do the Yukon Snowmobile Trail and Brimson Snowmobile Trail. There is also the Erkki Harju Ski Trail.

== Government and politics ==
Lake County Search and Rescue is a division of Lake County's Sheriff department. It was created in 1971 and placed in Two Harbors. Its formation was helped by Silver Bay Search and Rescue. Its first meeting place was a room at the depot, from which it moved to the old Svee Distributing building at 616 3rd Avenue. In 1980 it took over the former U.S. Forestry Service garage complex on 16th Avenue.

Presidential election results 1960–2024

Precinct General Election Results
Year	Republican	Democratic	Third parties
2024	42.6% 871	55.7% 1,140	1.7% 35
2020	42.4% 901	54.9% 1,167	2.7% 58
2016	39.3% 781	52.2% 1,036	8.5% 169
2012	31.6% 665	66.3% 1,394	2.1% 44
2008	32.5% 710	65.3% 1,427	2.2% 48
2004	31.5% 708	67.5% 1,516	1.0% 22
2000	30.3% 623	62.4% 1,284	7.3% 151
1996	23.8% 444	65.0% 1,213	11.2% 210
1992	20.7% 431	59.3% 1,235	20.0% 416
1988	26.1% 515	73.9% 1,455	0.0% 0
1984	23.2% 507	76.8% 1,681	0.0% 0
1980	25.1% 568	66.7% 1,512	8.2% 186
1976	29.2% 660	68.3% 1,543	2.5% 57
1972	32.7% 755	66.4% 1,535	0.9% 22
1968	19.6% 444	77.7% 1,763	2.7% 62
1964	19.1% 435	80.8% 1,840	0.1% 3
1960	35.7% 879	64.0% 1,573	0.3% 8

== Education ==
In 1901, Two Harbors decided it needed a high school. On February 12, 1902, Two Harbors Central High School was dedicated at a cost of $35,025. It was on the 400 block of Fourth Avenue, and had 50 students and three teachers. The first students to graduate were Mary Rylander and Ann Paulson. The school taught arithmetic, grammar, and American history. Very little English was taught at the time. In 1903 Latin and music were introduced. Courses in science and sewing were added in 1906. Manual training and domestic services were introduced in 1908. By 1909 the school had 98 students and seven teachers. By 1910 the school library had 7,000 books. Plans for a new building were announced in 1935, at an estimated $100,000. The original Central High School was demolished and the new building was completed in 1939. At completion, and after all additions were made, the total cost was $585,000. A referendum for a new building two miles (3 km) north of town on Lake County Highway 2 (CR 2) was passed in 2003. Building was completed and classes began in 2005. Students use the hiking trails in the woods, around ponds, and the football field. The former high school on 4th Avenue was demolished in 2008.

== Notable people ==
- Philip Berrigan – Catonsville Nine member, born here
- Rhonda Britten – actress, best-selling author, motivational speaker and coach; Starting Over; born here
- Leroy Goldsworthy – NHL player; first Minnesotan to get his name on the Stanley Cup
- Warren E. Hastings – politician and locomotive engineer, lived in Two Harbors
- Jeremy Mayer – sculptor, subject of the documentary California Typewriter, attended middle and high school here
- Don Moen – singer/songwriter, attended and graduated from Two Harbors High School
- Lute Olson – Hall of Fame college basketball coach, coached the Two Harbors High School basketball team 1957–1961
- August Omtvedt – politician and businessman, lived in Two Harbors
- Esther Rose (born Esther Holbeck) – Western artist, born in Two Harbors
- Joseph Edward Therrien – politician and businessman, lived in Two Harbors
- Johnny Western – singer, songwriter, musician and actor; born here
