= John Beargrease =

Native American mail carrier from Minnesota

- Esquabi
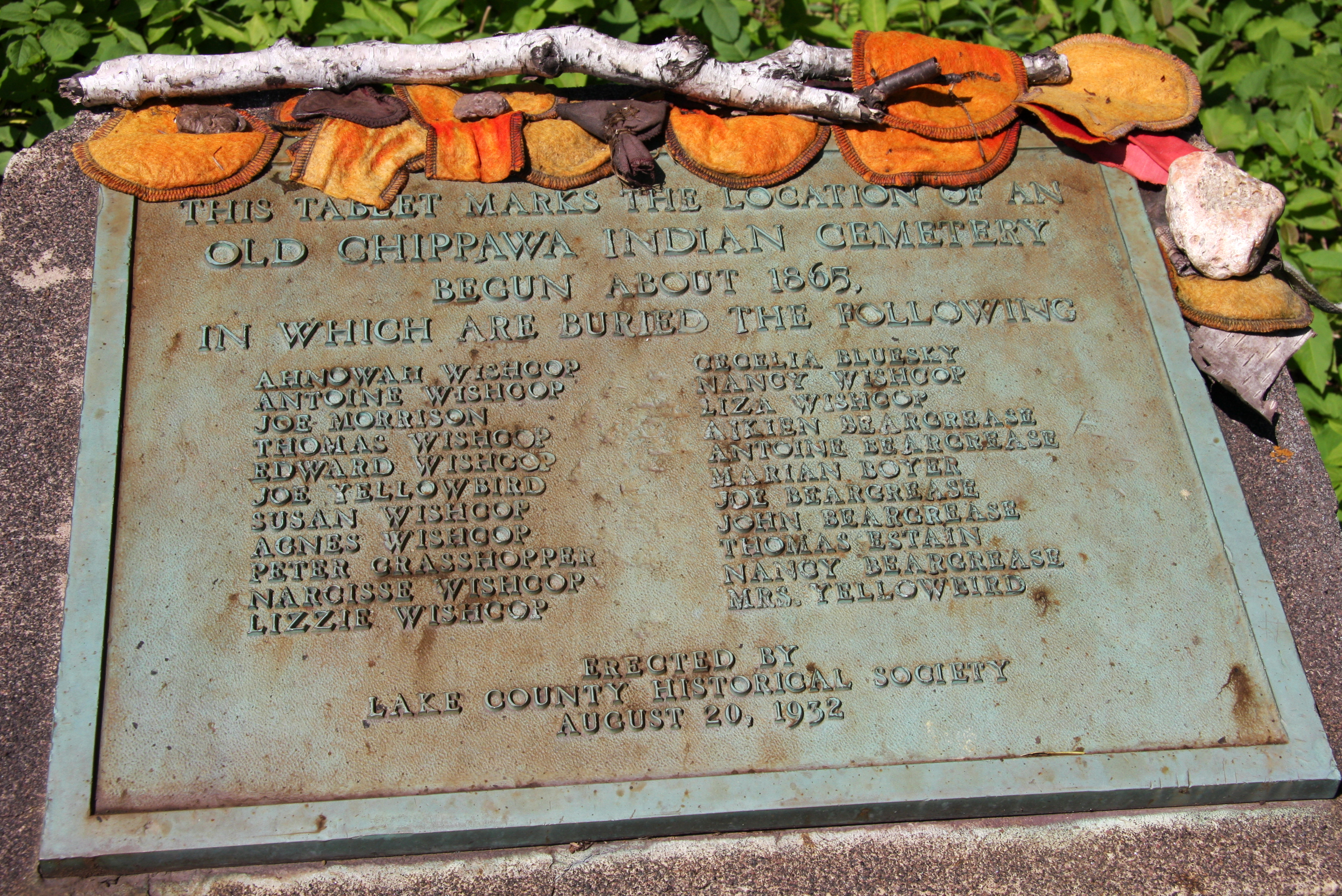
- Cemetery marker listing John Beargrease
- Born: 1858 present-day Lake County, Minnesota
- Died: August 1, 1910 (aged 51–52); Beaver Bay, Minnesota
- Resting place: Chippewa Cemetery
- Citizenship: Grand Portage Ojibwe and U.S.
- Occupation: postman
- Employer: US Postal Service
- Parents: Makwabimidem (father); Newagagamsbag (mother)

John Beargrease (Ojibwe: Esquabi; 1858 – August 1, 1910) was the son of an Anishinaabe chief, Makwabimidem (Beargrease). He is best remembered as the winter mail carrier between Two Harbors, Minnesota and Grand Marais, Minnesota during the last two decades of the 19th century. Beargrease used a row boat and a dog sled to deliver the mail.

His legendary dog sled runs are remembered and celebrated in the annual 411-mile John Beargrease Dog Sled Race between Duluth and Grand Portage, Minnesota. He died at his home in Beaver Bay, Minnesota in 1910.

== Early life ==
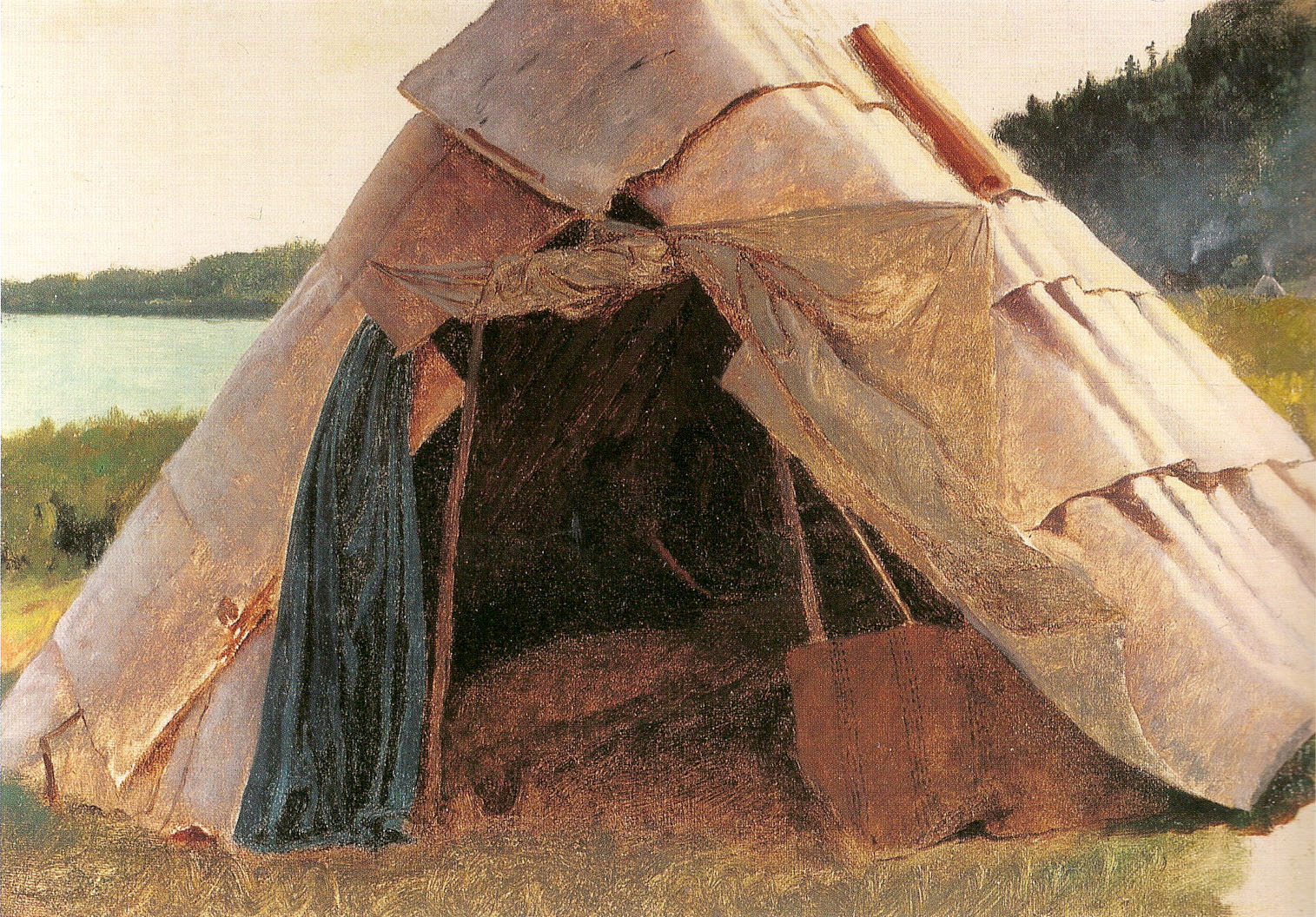
Ojibwe Wigwam at Grand Portage, painted by Eastman Johnson in 1857

John Beargrease was born near Cass Lake or Beaver Bay in 1858, the same year that Minnesota became a state. His father, Makwabimidem, also spelled Moquabimeten, "Beargrease," was the chief of a small group of Ojibwe that settled in Beaver Bay in 1858 to work in the sawmill. His mother Newagagamsbag (Otoe) and two brothers named Peter (Daybosh) and Joseph (Skowegan) lived in a wigwam on the edge of town. Besides his work as a trapper, John's father was also a sailor on a schooner owned by the town's founder, Albert Wieland.

== Career ==
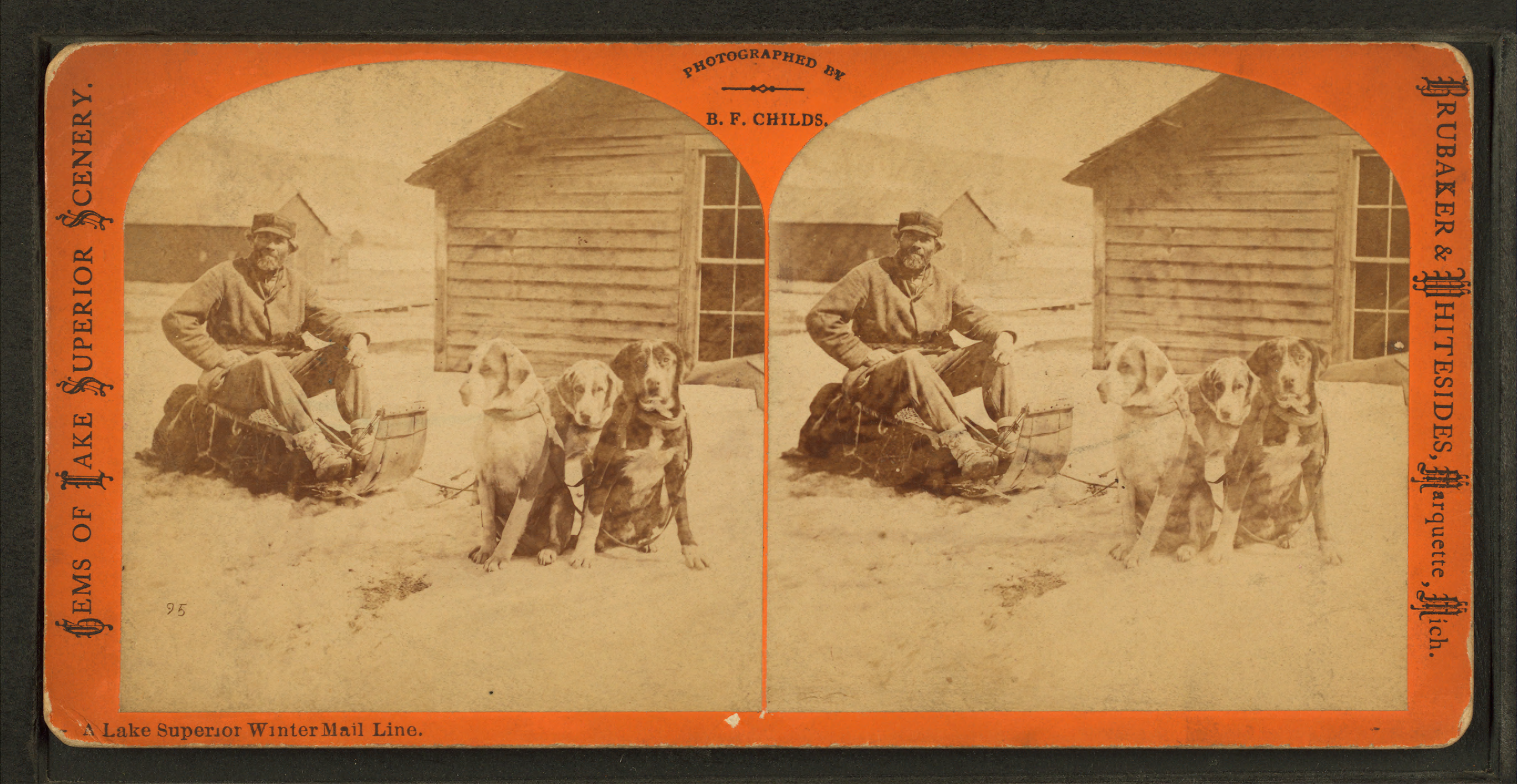
Stereoscopic photo titled, "Lake Superior winter mail line, by Childs, B. F."

Makwabimidem taught his sons trapping, hunting, and fishing. They also worked for the Wieland family. In his late teens, John worked on commercial fishing, passenger, and freight ships that sailed on Lake Superior. By the 1880s, when John was in his twenties, the North Shore had many small settlements that could be reached by the recently built railroad, but it only went as far as Two Harbors. In 1879 Beargrease and his brothers started delivering the mail between Two Harbors and Grand Marais, occasionally going all the way to Grand Portage. The trail they followed along the North Shore was a footpath from Duluth to Thunder Bay, first traveled by the Anishinaabe and later by the European and Euro-American fishing families and fur traders that settled along the North Shore. The Beargrease family knew the route well because they ran trap lines along it to sell furs to the European markets. The trail was filled with hundreds of streams, gorges, raging rivers, and untrustworthy footbridges. Winters brought blizzards with mountainous snow drifts. Summer brought rains, mosquitoes, ticks, and flies.

John is best known for his dogsled trips. Each week, or sometimes twice a week, he or one of his brothers took the mail trip from Two Harbors to Grand Marais. His fastest trip by dogsled was 28 hours; he once made the trip in 20 hours by boat. The Minnesota Historical Society writes: "The mail carrier was the link to the outside world for the people living along the North Shore. Everyone awaited his arrival with anticipation. He was the weather broadcaster and news teller. News of national importance or letters from loved ones were in his pack." They write of his mail delivery contract beginning in 1890:

In early 1890, the Duluth Daily Tribune announced that summertime steamboat mail service was to begin from Duluth to Port Arthur. People still had to rely on rowboats, dogsleds, and/or snowshoes for the delivery of mail in the spring, fall, and winter. Beargrease's rowboat replaced the steamboat after just one season in 1891. The "Star Route" businessmen, who owned the "Dixon", contracted with the Post Office Department for several mail routes. They found it more beneficial to sub-contract each route. They could make more of a profit employing Beargrease than with the "Dixon" steamship. In late 1894, Beargrease contracted with the post office directly. He won a prime contract, No. 41436, for the service extending through the winters of 1895-96 and 1896-97. He was paid $728.00 per annum. After 1899, he retired from his mail contract but still continued with his fur trading business.

== Personal life ==
Beargrease married Louise Wishcob, a member of another prominent family in the area. Sources contradict themselves as to the number of children John and Louise Beargrease had. Some sources say they had 12 children.

== Death ==
John Beargrease died in Beaver Bay on August 10, 1910. Tuberculosis is listed as his cause of death on his death certificate. Some sources mention that he died from pneumonia caused by saving another mail carrier by diving into the freezing waters of Lake Superior.

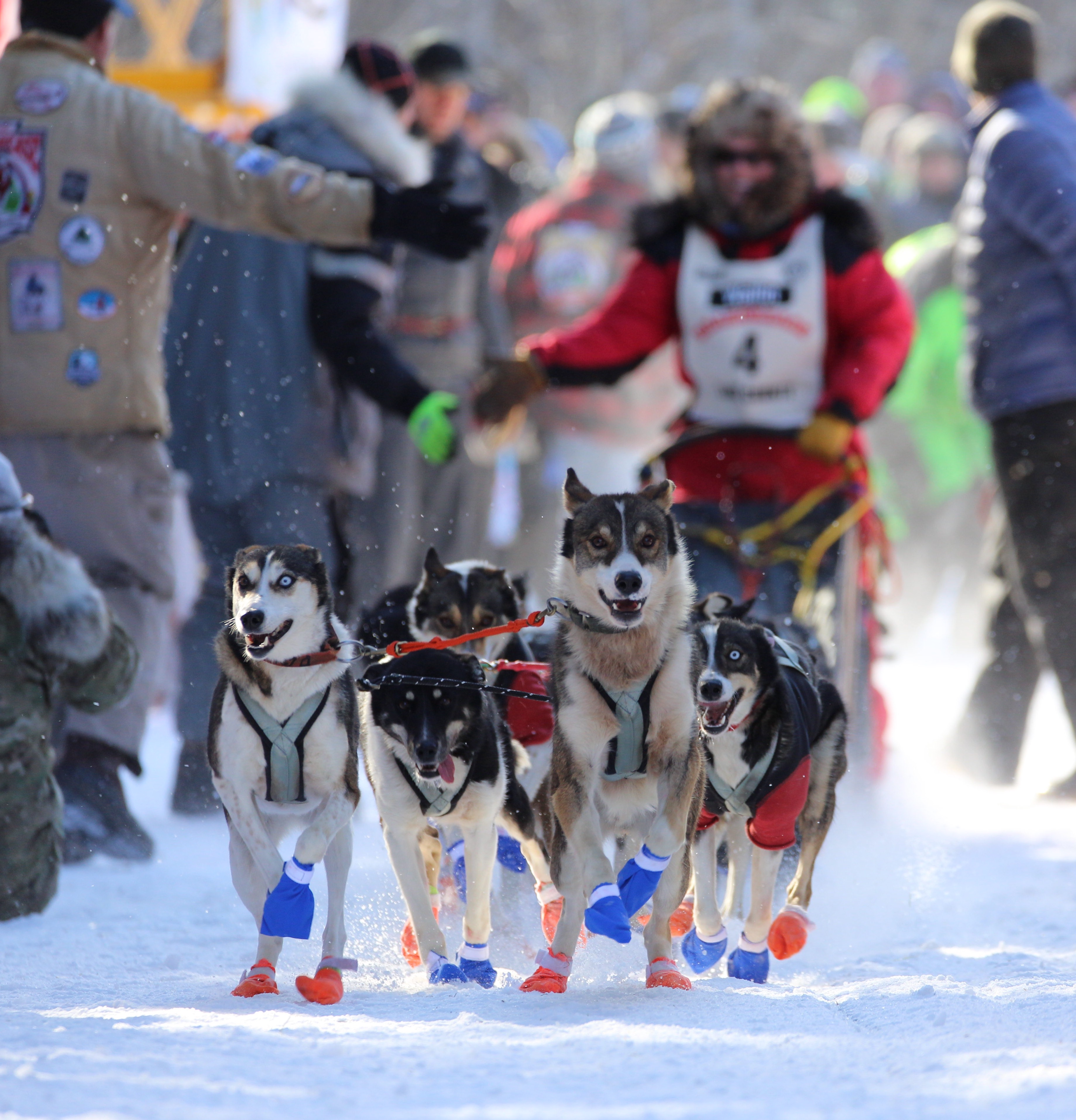
John Beargrease Dogsled Marathon, Two Harbors Minnesota

One source reads:

He made his home in both Beaver Bay and among his people in Grand Portage. He never forgot how much the people living on the North Shore depended upon the mail. One day in 1910, he went out in a storm to rescue another mail carrier whose boat was caught in the waves off Tamarack Point, near Grand Portage. He caught pneumonia after the ordeal and died soon after. His grave can be seen today at the Indian Cemetery in Beaver Bay.

== Legacy ==
The 400-mile John Beargrease Dogsled Race has been named to honor him.
