= Cushing, Wisconsin =

- Unincorporated community
- Location within Wisconsin Location within the United States
- Coordinates: 45°34′14″N 92°39′04″W
- Country: United States
- State: Wisconsin
- County: Polk
- Elevation: 1,014 ft (309 m)
- Time zone: UTC-6 (Central (CST))
  - Summer (DST): UTC-5 (CDT)
- ZIP code: 54006
- Area codes: 715 & 534
- GNIS feature ID: 1563638

Cushing is an unincorporated community in Polk County, Wisconsin, United States. Cushing is located on Wisconsin Highway 87 north of St. Croix Falls, in the towns of Laketown and Sterling. Cushing has a post office with ZIP code 54006 and a telephone exchange of 648.

== History ==
The community was named for Caleb Cushing, a Massachusetts politician and diplomat. The post office was established in 1870 with James Smith as the first postmaster.

== Notable events ==
Cushing Fun Days is an annual event that includes turtle races and a soap box derby. Cushing has softball tournaments on both Memorial Day and Labor Day.
