= Duluth and Iron Range Railroad =

American transport company

The Duluth and Iron Range Railroad (reporting mark D&IR; DIR) was founded in 1874.

In 1884, it ran the first main line train between Two Harbors and Soudan, Minnesota, a total distance of 68 miles. In July 1938, the railway merged with the Duluth, Missabe and Northern Railway to form the Duluth, Missabe and Iron Range Railway.
