= Fairbanks Township, St. Louis County, Minnesota =

Fairbanks Township, Minnesota
- Township
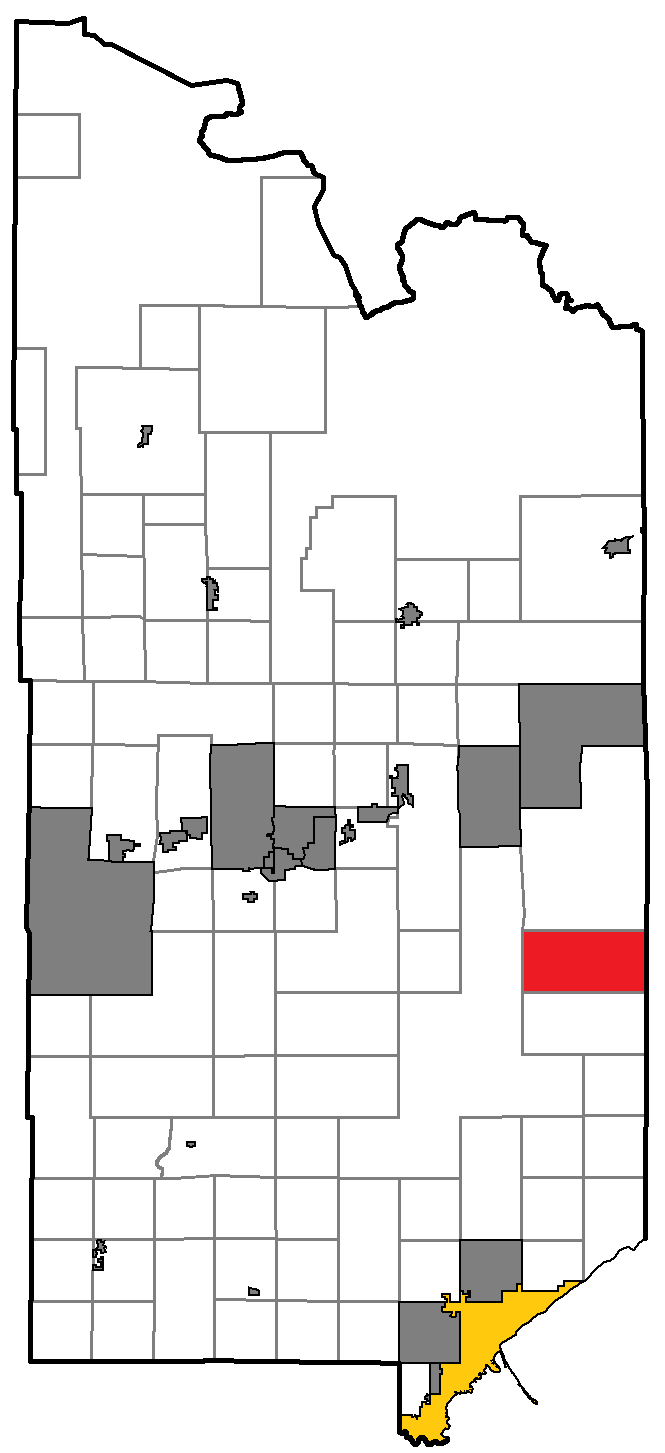
- Location of Fairbanks Township within St. Louis County, Minnesota
- Coordinates: 47°19′18″N 91°51′20″W
- Country: United States
- State: Minnesota
- County: Saint Louis

Area
  - Total: 71.9 sq mi (186.3 km^{2})
  - Land: 70.0 sq mi (181.2 km^{2})
  - Water: 2.0 sq mi (5.1 km^{2})
- Elevation: 1,572 ft (479 m)

Population (2020)
  - Total: 66
  - Density: 0.94/sq mi (0.36/km^{2})
- Time zone: UTC-6 (Central (CST))
  - Summer (DST): UTC-5 (CDT)
- FIPS code: 27-20186
- GNIS feature ID: 0664127

Fairbanks Township is a township in Saint Louis County, Minnesota, United States. The population was 66 at the 2020 census.

The unincorporated communities of Fairbanks and Petrel are located within Fairbanks Township.

Saint Louis County Road 16 runs east–west along Fairbanks Township's northern boundary line with adjacent Bassett Township.

County Road 44 runs north–south through the eastern portion of Fairbanks Township; the roadway continues south to Brimson.

The town was named for U.S. senator and vice president Charles Warren Fairbanks.

== Geography ==
According to the United States Census Bureau, the township has a total area of 71.9 square miles (186 km^{2}); 70.0 square miles (181 km^{2}) is land and 2.0 square miles (5.2 km^{2}), or 2.74%, is water.

Fairbanks Township is located within the Superior National Forest.

The Cloquet River flows through the southeast corner of Fairbanks Township. The West Branch of the Cloquet River flows through the central portion of the township. The South Branch of the Whiteface River flows through the southwest part of the township. The North Branch of the Whiteface River flows through the northwest part of the township.

Creeks that flow through the township include Porcupine, Reno, Jenkins, Hornby, Petrel, Berry, Breda, Nelson, Store, Indian, Hypo, and Howell.

Wolf Lake, Cadotte Lake, and Bassett Lake are all partially located within Fairbanks Township.

=== Adjacent townships and communities ===
The following are adjacent to Fairbanks Township:

- Ault Township (south)
- The unincorporated community of Brimson (south)
- Cloquet Valley State Forest (south and southwest)
- Linwood Lake Unorganized Territory (southwest and west)
- Hush Lake Unorganized Territory (northwest)
- Bassett Township (north)
- The unincorporated community of Bassett (north)
- Lake No. 2 Unorganized Territory of Lake County (east)

=== Unincorporated communities ===
- Fairbanks
- Petrel

== Demographics ==
As of the census of 2000, there were 68 people, 39 households, and 21 families residing in the township. The population density was 1.0 inhabitant per square mile (0.39/km^{2}). There were 127 housing units at an average density of 1.8 per square mile (0.69/km^{2}). The racial makeup of the township was 98.53% White, and 1.47% from two or more races.

There were 39 households, out of which 10.3% had children under the age of 18 living with them, 48.7% were married couples living together, 2.6% had a female householder with no husband present, and 43.6% were non-families. 41.0% of all households were made up of individuals, and 17.9% had someone living alone who was 65 years of age or older. The average household size was 1.74 and the average family size was 2.27.

In the township the population was spread out, with 7.4% under the age of 18, 1.5% from 18 to 24, 26.5% from 25 to 44, 33.8% from 45 to 64, and 30.9% who were 65 years of age or older. The median age was 53 years. For every 100 females, there were 106.1 males. For every 100 females age 18 and over, there were 103.2 males.

The median income for a household in the township was $38,750, and the median income for a family was $40,417. Males had a median income of $31,667 versus $30,833 for females. The per capita income for the township was $24,939. There were no families and 3.8% of the population living below the poverty line, including no under eighteens and none of those over 64.
