= Superior National Forest Scenic Byway =

Scenic highway in Minnesota, United States

Federal Forest Highway 11
- Superior National Forest Scenic Byway
- Superior National Forest Scenic Byway highlighted in brown

Route information
- Maintained by MnDOT
- Length: 77.803 mi (Note: Mileage is calculated from MnDOT logs of state and county roads.) (125.212 km)
- Existed: 1999–present

Major junctions
- West end: MN 37 / CR 97 in Gilbert
- East end: MN 61 in Silver Bay

Location
- Country: United States
- State: Minnesota

Highway system
- Forest Highway System; Minnesota Trunk Highway System; Interstate; US; State; Legislative; Scenic

The Superior National Forest Scenic Byway (SNFSB), also known as Forest Highway 11, is a combination of state and county highways in Minnesota that travel between the historic communities of the Iron Range and Lake Superior's North Shore. The byway is 78 miles (126 km) of paved, two-lane roads and is marked by navigational signs with the SNFSB logo. The route was given State Scenic Byway status in 1999.

== Route description ==
The byway begins in Gilbert, at the intersection of State Highway 37 (MN 37) and Sparta Road. The route follows MN 37 to MN 135, continuing eastward along the latter through Biwabik and then to Aurora, where it leaves MN 135 and follows County Road 100 (CR 100) to the center of town. From there it turns south until the city border, and then resumes its eastward travel along CR 110 to Hoyt Lakes. From Hoyt Lakes the road gradually arcs southward. This portion is also called Skibo Lookout Road, after the Skibo Vista Scenic Overlook, which overlooks the Laurentian Divide. CR 110 ends at its junction with CR 16 (Town Line Road), and the byway route again continues east, through the unincorporated towns of Fairbanks and Basset. Crossing the St. Louis–Lake county line, the roadway becomes CR 15 and passes through Toimi. This is the longest portion of the route, traveling 23 miles (37 km) to Lax Lake Road, where it turns south along CR 4 for approximately two miles (3.2 km). It then travels east along CR 5 into Silver Bay, ending at MN 61 near the North Shore.

== History ==
The byway was established in 1999, traveling 61 miles (98 km) from Aurora to Silver Bay. The route was extended in 2014 to Gilbert.

== Major intersections ==
County	Location	mi	km	Destinations	Notes
St. Louis	Gilbert	0.000	0.000	MN 37 west / CR 97 southeast (Sparta Road)	Follows MN 37 east
St. Louis	Gilbert	1.728	2.781	CR 105 (Indiana Avenue)	
St. Louis	Gilbert	1.867	3.005	MN 135	
St. Louis	Biwabik Township	4.772	7.680	CR 20	
St. Louis	Biwabik	9.669	15.561	CR 4 (Vermilion Trail)	
St. Louis	Biwabik	10.529	16.945	CR 138	
St. Louis	Aurora	13.130	21.131	MN 135 north / CR 100 east / CR 110 south	Follows CR 100
St. Louis	Aurora	14.630	23.545	CR 130 east (Forestry Road)	
St. Louis	Aurora	15.180	24.430	CR 110 (5th Avenue S.)	Follows CR 110 east
St. Louis	Aurora	16.100	25.910	CR 130 north (Forestry Road)	
St. Louis	Bassett Township	34.699	55.843	CR 16 (Town Line Road)	Follows CR 16 east
St. Louis	Bassett Township	42.550	68.478	CR 44 south	
Lake	Lake No. 2	53.370	85.891	CSAH 2 south	
Lake	Silver Creek Township	54.460	87.645	CSAH 2 north	
Lake	Beaver Bay Township	71.936	115.770	CSAH 4 south / CSAH 31 north (Lax Lake Road)	Follows CR 4
Lake	Beaver Bay Township	73.956	119.021	CSAH 5 east	Follows CR 5
Lake	Silver Bay	77.803	125.212	MN 61	
1.000 mi = 1.609 km; 1.000 km = 0.621 mi

== See also ==
- North Shore Scenic Drive
- Gunflint Trail
