= White Township, St. Louis County, Minnesota =

White Township, Minnesota
- Township
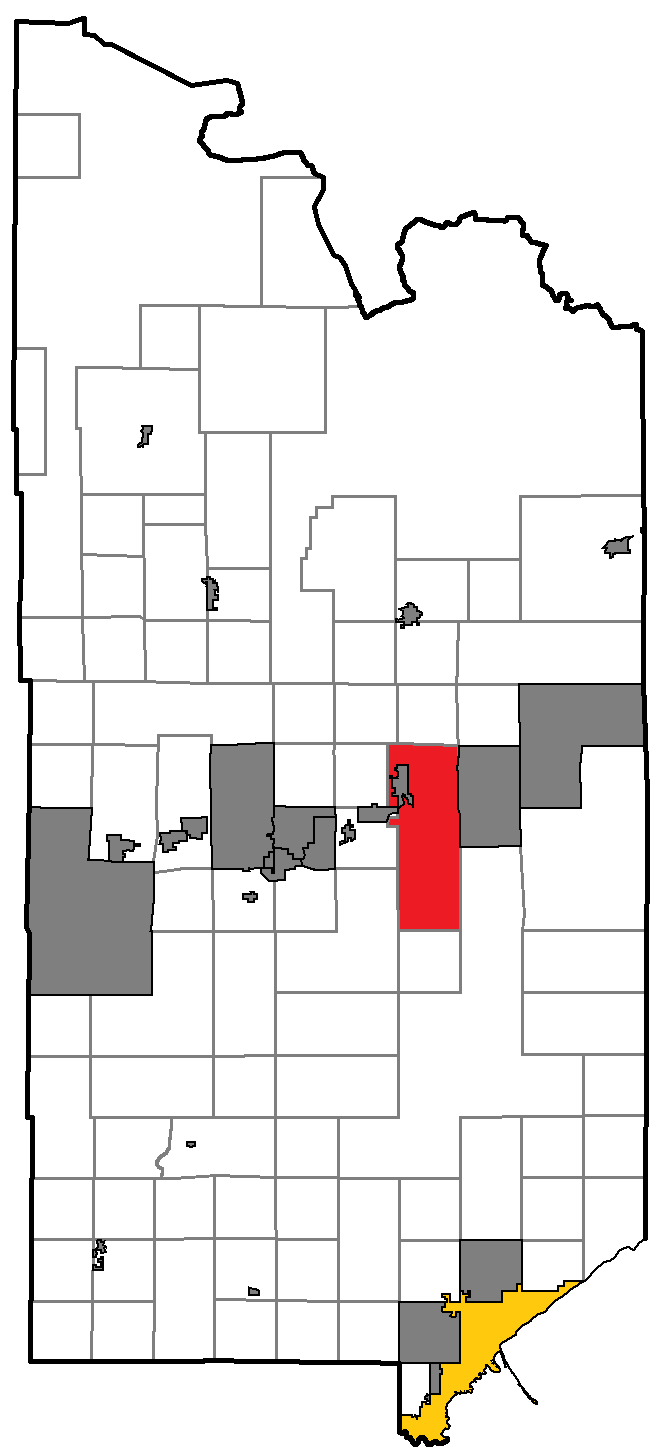
- Location of White Township within St. Louis County, Minnesota
- Coordinates: 47°29′49″N 92°14′46″W
- Country: United States
- State: Minnesota
- County: Saint Louis

Area
  - Total: 113.4 sq mi (293.8 km^{2})
  - Land: 109.2 sq mi (282.9 km^{2})
  - Water: 4.2 sq mi (10.9 km^{2})
- Elevation: 1,424 ft (434 m)

Population (2010)
  - Total: 3,229
  - Density: 29.56/sq mi (11.41/km^{2})
- Time zone: UTC-6 (Central (CST))
  - Summer (DST): UTC-5 (CDT)
- FIPS code: 27-69898
- GNIS feature ID: 0665980

White Township is an urban township in Saint Louis County, Minnesota, United States. The population was 3,136 at the 2020 census.

Saint Louis County Highways 100 and 110; State Highway 135 (MN 135); and Vermilion Trail (County 4) are four of the main routes in the township.

The unincorporated communities of Palo and Pineville are both located within the township.

The city of Aurora is located within White Township geographically but is a separate entity. Biwabik and Hoyt Lakes are nearby.

== History ==
White Township was named for an official at the local Kimberly Mining Company.

== Geography ==
According to the United States Census Bureau, the township has a total area of 113.4 square miles (294 km^{2}); 109.2 square miles (283 km^{2}) is land and 4.2 square miles (11 km^{2}), or 3.72%, is water.

Several lakes, rivers, and scenic nature trails are located within the township. The Saint Louis River and the Partridge River both flow through White Township. The Embarrass River flows through the northwest corner of the township. Water Hen Creek flows through the southeast part of the township. Mud Hen Creek briefly flows through the southwest corner of the township. First Creek and Second Creek also flow through the township.

=== Adjacent townships, cities, and communities ===
The following are adjacent to White Township:

- Colvin Township (south)
- The unincorporated community of Markham (south)
- Mud Hen Lake Unorganized Territory (southwest)
- The unincorporated community of Makinen (southwest)
- Tikander Lake Unorganized Territory (west)
- Biwabik Township (west)
- The city of Biwabik (west)
- Hay Lake Unorganized Territory (west)
- Pike Township (northwest)
- Embarrass Township (north)
- The unincorporated community of Embarrass (north)
- Waasa Township (northeast)
- The city of Hoyt Lakes (east)
- Hush Lake Unorganized Territory (east)
- Linwood Lake Unorganized Territory (southeast)

=== Unincorporated communities ===
- Palo
- Pineville

White Township covers an enormous area. Saint Louis County Highway 100 runs north–south through the central and south–central portions of White Township. MN 135 runs north–south through the northern portion of White Township. MN 135 continues north to Embarrass Township. County Highway 110 runs east–west through the east-central portion of White Township. Highway 110 continues east to Hoyt Lakes. Vermilion Trail (County 4) passes through the southwest corner of White Township.

Townline Road–County Highway 16 (CR 16) runs east–west along White Township's southern boundary line with adjacent Colvin Township and the nearby community of Markham.

== Demographics ==
As of the census of 2000, there were 3,477 people, 1,466 households, and 976 families residing in the township. The population density was 31.8 inhabitants per square mile (12.3/km^{2}). There were 1,645 housing units at an average density of 15.1/sq mi (5.8/km^{2}). The racial makeup of the township was 98.13% White, 0.03% African American, 0.43% Native American, 0.32% Asian, 0.03% from other races, and 1.06% from two or more races. Hispanic or Latino of any race were 0.43% of the population.

There were 1,466 households, out of which 23.9% had children under the age of 18 living with them, 56.1% were married couples living together, 6.6% had a female householder with no husband present, and 33.4% were non-families. 29.4% of all households were made up of individuals, and 14.3% had someone living alone who was 65 years of age or older. The average household size was 2.32 and the average family size was 2.83.

In the township, the population was spread out, with 21.3% under the age of 18, 7.0% from 18 to 24, 23.0% from 25 to 44, 29.1% from 45 to 64, and 19.6% who were 65 years of age or older. The median age was 44 years. For every 100 females, there were 100.8 males. For every 100 females age 18 and over, there were 101.8 males.

The median income for a household in the township was $37,529, and the median income for a family was $45,257. Males had a median income of $43,854 versus $24,167 for females. The per capita income for the township was $19,431. About 7.2% of families and 10.1% of the population were below the poverty line, including 21.5% of those under age 18 and 4.9% of those age 65 or over.
