= Bassett Township, St. Louis County, Minnesota =

Bassett Township, Minnesota
- Township
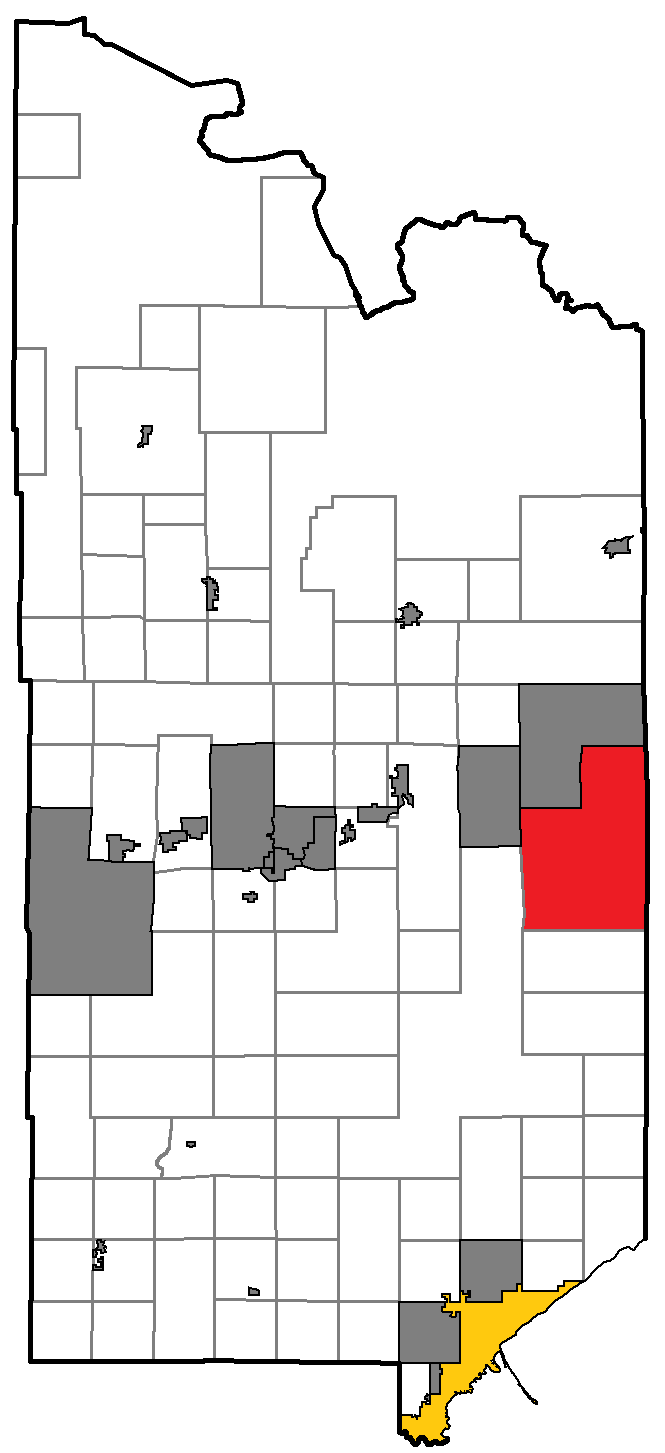
- Location of Bassett Township within St. Louis County, Minnesota
- Coordinates: 47°26′28″N 91°54′6″W
- Country: United States
- State: Minnesota
- County: Saint Louis

Area
  - Total: 182.2 sq mi (471.8 km^{2})
  - Land: 174.5 sq mi (452.0 km^{2})
  - Water: 7.6 sq mi (19.8 km^{2})
- Elevation: 1,670 ft (509 m)

Population (2020)
  - Total: 36
  - Density: 0.21/sq mi (0.080/km^{2})
- Time zone: UTC-6 (Central (CST))
  - Summer (DST): UTC-5 (CDT)
- FIPS code: 27-03880
- GNIS feature ID: 0663519

Bassett Township is a township in Saint Louis County, Minnesota, United States. The township was named for William Bassett, a businessperson in the lumber industry. The population was 36 at the 2020 census.

Saint Louis County Roads 16 and 110 are two of the main routes in the township.

County Road 16 runs east–west along Bassett Township's southern boundary line with adjacent Fairbanks Township. County Road 110 runs north–south through the western portion of Bassett Township; the roadway continues north-northwest to Hoyt Lakes.

The unincorporated communities of Bassett and Skibo are located within Bassett Township.

== Geography ==
According to the United States Census Bureau, the township has a total area of 182.2 square miles (472 km^{2}); 174.5 square miles (452 km^{2}) is land and 7.6 square miles (20 km^{2}), or 4.19%, is water.

Bassett Township is the largest organized township in land area in Saint Louis County.

The township is located within the Superior National Forest. The Dunka River flows through the northern part of the township.

The Partridge River flows through the northwest corner of Bassett Township. The Saint Louis River flows through the central portion of the township.

The North Branch of the Whiteface River flows through the south–central and southeast portions of Bassett Township.

Creeks that flow through the township include Shiver, Reno, Jenkins, Apple, Toimi, Petrel, Nelson, Store, Laird, Stone, Butterball, Cranberry, and Colvin.

Pine Lake, Cadotte Lake, and Bassett Lake are all partially located within Bassett Township. Lakes within the township include Seven Beaver Lake, Big Lake, Round Lake, and Stone Lake.

=== Adjacent townships, cities, and communities ===
The following are adjacent to Bassett Township:

- Fairbanks Township (south)
- The unincorporated community of Fairbanks (south)
- Linwood Lake Unorganized Territory (southwest)
- Hush Lake Unorganized Territory (west)
- The city of Hoyt Lakes (west and northwest)
- The city of Babbitt (north)
- Stony River Township of Lake County (northeast)
- Lake No. 2 Unorganized Territory of Lake County (east)

=== Unincorporated communities ===
- Bassett
- Skibo

== Demographics ==
As of the census of 2000, there were 55 people, 25 households, and 19 families residing in the township. The population density was 0.3 inhabitants per square mile (0.12/km^{2}). There were 89 housing units at an average density of 0.5 per square mile (0.19/km^{2}). The racial makeup of the township was 94.55% White and 5.45% Native American.

There were 25 households, out of which 36.0% had children under the age of 18 living with them, 64.0% were married couples living together, 8.0% had a female householder with no husband present, and 24.0% were non-families. 20.0% of all households were made up of individuals, and 4.0% had someone living alone who was 65 years of age or older. The average household size was 2.20 and the average family size was 2.47.

In the township the population was spread out, with 20.0% under the age of 18, 3.6% from 18 to 24, 34.5% from 25 to 44, 30.9% from 45 to 64, and 10.9% who were 65 years of age or older. The median age was 42 years. For every 100 females, there were 96.4 males. For every 100 females age 18 and over, there were 109.5 males.

The median income for a household in the township was $32,500, and the median income for a family was $31,875. Males had a median income of $47,083 versus $31,250 for females. The per capita income for the township was $24,879. There were 20.0% of families and 14.9% of the population living below the poverty line, including 30.0% of under eighteens and none of those over 64.
