= Bassett, Minnesota =

- Unincorporated community
- Location within Minnesota Location within the United States
- Coordinates: 47°23′14″N 91°49′44″W
- Country: United States
- State: Minnesota
- County: Saint Louis
- Township: Bassett Township
- Elevation: 1,719 ft (524 m)

Population
  - Total: 10
- Time zone: UTC-6 (Central (CST))
  - Summer (DST): UTC-5 (CDT)
- ZIP codes: 55602
- Area code: 218
- GNIS feature ID: 1989116

Bassett is an unincorporated community in Bassett Township, Saint Louis County, Minnesota, United States located within the Superior National Forest.

The community is located 23 miles southeast of the city of Hoyt Lakes on Saint Louis County Highway 16. Highway 16 serves as a direct east–west route in northeast Minnesota between U.S. Highway 53 and Silver Bay. Bassett is located 34 miles northwest of the city of Two Harbors.

The boundary line between Saint Louis and Lake counties is near Bassett.

Hall Road and Round Lake Road are both in the vicinity.

The communities of Fairbanks, Toimi, Petrel, Brimson, Rollins, and Wales are all located near Bassett.

Toimi Creek and Petrel Creek both flow through the community.

The town was threatened by the Camp House Fire of May 2025.
