= Fairbanks, Minnesota =

Fairbanks
- Unincorporated community
- Location within Minnesota Location within the United States
- Coordinates: 47°22′14″N 91°55′36″W
- Country: United States
- State: Minnesota
- County: Saint Louis
- Township: Fairbanks Township
- Elevation: 1,654 ft (504 m)

Population
  - Total: 10
- Time zone: UTC-6 (Central (CST))
  - Summer (DST): UTC-5 (CDT)
- ZIP code: 55602
- Area code: 218
- GNIS feature ID: 661243

Fairbanks is an unincorporated community in Fairbanks Township, Saint Louis County, Minnesota, United States; located within the Superior National Forest.

== Geography ==
The community is 18 miles southeast of the city of Hoyt Lakes along Saint Louis County Highway 16 / Forest Highway 11 (co-signed). CR 16 / FFH 11 serves as a direct east–west route in northeast Minnesota between U.S. Highway 53 and Silver Bay. Fairbanks is located 36 miles northwest of the city of Two Harbors.

The boundary line between Saint Louis and Lake counties is near Fairbanks.

The communities of Bassett, Petrel, Brimson, Rollins, Toimi, and Wales are all located near Fairbanks.

Cadotte Lake and Bassett Lake are in the vicinity.

== History ==
A post office called Fairbanks was established in 1905, and remained in operation until 1953. The community was named for Charles W. Fairbanks, 26th Vice President of the United States.
