= Whiteface Reservoir, Minnesota =

Unorganized territory in Saint Louis County, Minnesota, United States

Whiteface Reservoir
- Unorganized territory
- Whiteface Reservoir Unorganized Territory
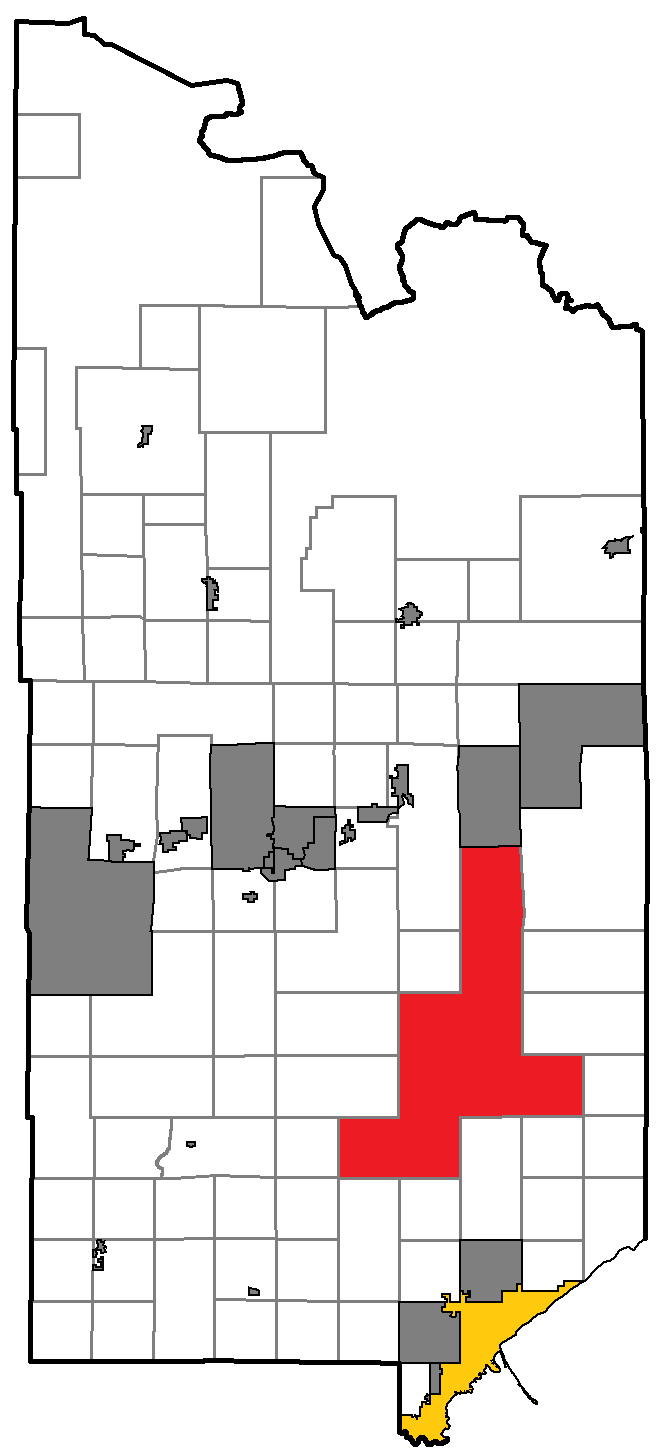
- Location of Whiteface Reservoir within St. Louis County, Minnesota
- Coordinates: 47°11′53″N 92°11′34″W
- Country: United States
- State: Minnesota
- County: Saint Louis

Area
  - Total: 336.01 sq mi (870.3 km^{2})
  - Land: 323.31 sq mi (837.4 km^{2})
  - Water: 12.70 sq mi (32.9 km^{2})

Population (2020)
  - Total: 502
  - Density: 1.55/sq mi (0.599/km^{2})
- Time zone: UTC-6 (Central (CST))
  - Summer (DST): UTC-5 (Central (CDT))
- GNIS feature ID: 665986

Whiteface Reservoir is an unorganized territory in Saint Louis County, Minnesota, United States. The population was 502 at the 2020 census.

Saint Louis County Roads 4 (Vermilion Trail) and 49 (Three Lakes Road) serve as the main routes in the area.

== Geography ==
According to the United States Census Bureau, the unorganized territory has a total area of 143.6 square miles (372 km^{2}); 138.1 square miles (358 km^{2}) is land and 5.5 square miles (14 km^{2}) (3.84%) is water.

A majority of Whiteface Reservoir Unorganized Territory is located within the Cloquet Valley State Forest of Saint Louis County.

=== Adjacent townships ===
The following are adjacent to Whiteface Reservoir Unorganized Territory:

- Ellsburg Township (northwest)
- Cotton Township (west)
- Northland Township (west)
- Grand Lake Township (southwest)
- Fredenberg Township (south)
- Gnesen Township (southeast)
- Marion Lake Unorganized Territory (east)
- Ault Township (northeast)
- Linwood Lake Unorganized Territory (north)
- The unincorporated community of Markham (north)

== Demographics ==
At the 2000 census, there were 292 people, 130 households, and 99 families living in the unorganized territory. The population density was 2.1 people per square mile (0.81 people/km^{2}). There were 340 housing units at an average density of 2.5 units per square mile (0.97 units/km^{2}). The racial makeup of the unorganized territory was 98.97% White, 0.68% Native American, and 0.34% from two or more races. Hispanic or Latino of any race were 0.34%.

Of the 130 households 14.6% had children under the age of 18 living with them, 71.5% were married couples living together, 3.8% had a female householder with no husband present, and 23.1% were non-families. 19.2% of households were one person and 7.7% were one person aged 65 or older. The average household size was 2.25 and the average family size was 2.53.

The age distribution was 12.7% under the age of 18, 6.2% from 18 to 24, 16.8% from 25 to 44, 48.6% from 45 to 64, and 15.8% 65 or older. The median age was 50 years. For every 100 females, there were 102.8 males. For every 100 females age 18 and over, there were 102.4 males.

The median household income was $47,500 and the median family income was $48,125. Males had a median income of $60,313 versus $29,792 for females. The per capita income for the unorganized territory was $34,764. None of the population or families were below the poverty line.
