= Ault Township, St. Louis County, Minnesota =

Ault Township, Minnesota
- Township
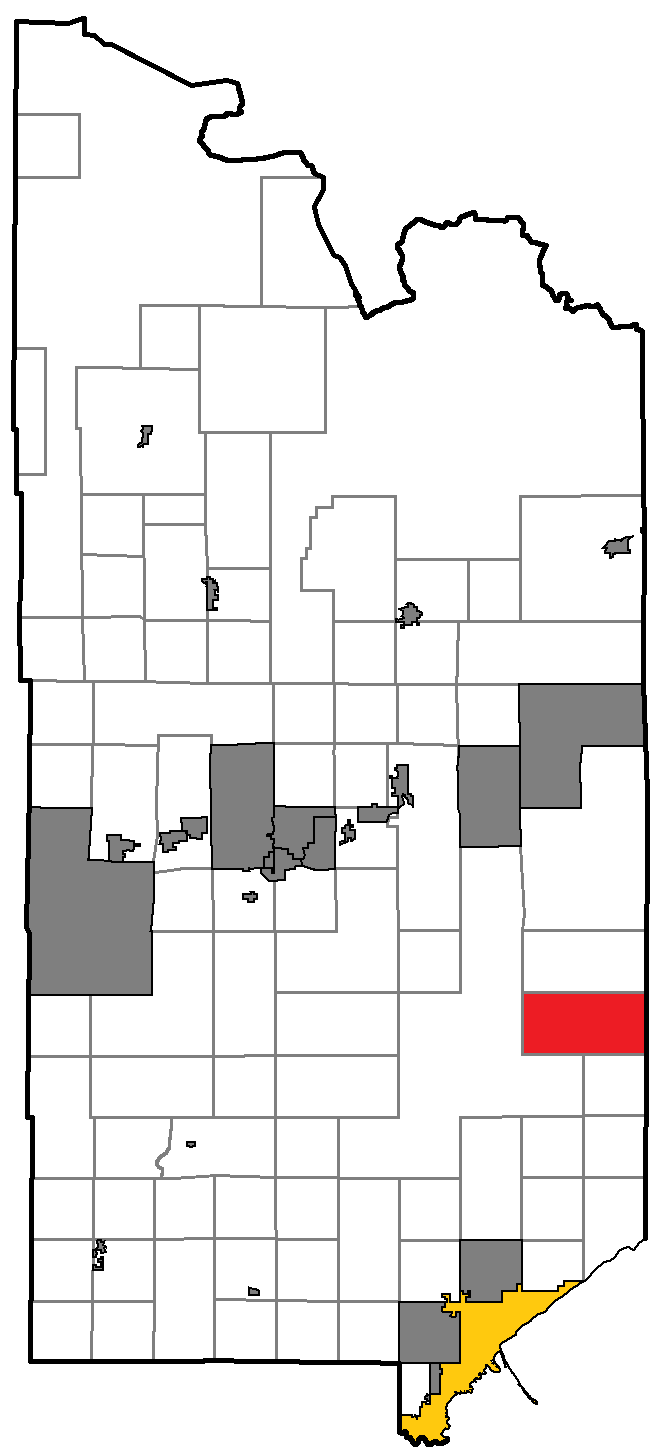
- Location of Ault Township within St. Louis County, Minnesota
- Coordinates: 47°14′42″N 91°52′57″W
- Country: United States
- State: Minnesota
- County: Saint Louis

Area
  - Total: 71.9 sq mi (186.1 km^{2})
  - Land: 70.1 sq mi (181.6 km^{2})
  - Water: 1.7 sq mi (4.5 km^{2})
- Elevation: 1,496 ft (456 m)

Population (2020)
  - Total: 128
  - Density: 1.83/sq mi (0.705/km^{2})
- Time zone: UTC-6 (Central (CST))
  - Summer (DST): UTC-5 (CDT)
- FIPS code: 27-02818
- GNIS feature ID: 0663479

Ault Township is a township in Saint Louis County, Minnesota, United States. The population was 128 at the 2020 census.

Saint Louis County Road 44 serves as a main route in the township.

The unincorporated community of Brimson is located within Ault Township.

The town's name comes from Ault, France.

== Geography ==
According to the United States Census Bureau, the township has a total area of 71.8 square miles (186 km^{2}); 70.1 square miles (182 km^{2}) is land and 1.7 square miles (4.4 km^{2}), or 2.42%, is water.

Ault Township is located within the Cloquet Valley State Forest.

The Cloquet River flows through Ault Township. The West Branch of the Cloquet River flows through the western and central portions of the township. The South Branch of the Whiteface River flows through the northwest corner of Ault Township.

Wolf Lake is partially located within the township. Indian Lake is located within Ault Township.

Creeks that flow through the township include Lahti, Civet, Wolf, Berry, Pine, and Coyote.

=== Adjacent townships ===
The following are adjacent to Ault Township :

- Pequaywan Township (south)
- Fairbanks Township (north)
- Lake No. 2 Unorganized Territory of Lake County (east)
- Whiteface Reservoir Unorganized Territory (southwest)
- Linwood Lake Unorganized Territory (west and northwest)

The Superior National Forest is also to the immediate north of Ault Township.

=== Unincorporated communities ===
- Brimson
- Rollins

== Demographics ==
At the 2000 census there were 125 people, 64 households, and 32 families living in the township. The population density was 1.8 people per square mile (0.7/km^{2}). There were 115 housing units at an average density of 1.6/sq mi (0.6/km^{2}). The racial makeup of the township was 99.20% White and 0.80% Native American. Of the 64 households 21.9% had children under the age of 18 living with them, 39.1% were married couples living together, 4.7% had a female householder with no husband present, and 50.0% were non-families. 43.8% of households were one person and 20.3% were one person aged 65 or older. The average household size was 1.95 and the average family size was 2.59.

The age distribution was 18.4% under the age of 18, 2.4% from 18 to 24, 25.6% from 25 to 44, 33.6% from 45 to 64, and 20.0% 65 or older. The median age was 46 years. For every 100 females, there were 127.3 males. For every 100 females age 18 and over, there were 126.7 males.

The median household income was $40,179 and the median family income was $43,750. Males had a median income of $41,458 versus $18,750 for females. The per capita income for the township was $18,007. There were 11.1% of families and 14.6% of the population living below the poverty line, including 23.8% of under eighteens and 20.0% of those over 64.
