= Skibo =

Skibo may refer to:

- Skibo Castle
- Skibo, Minnesota
- Skibo Productions, 1930s film production house associated with Educational Pictures
