= Waldo, Minnesota =

Unincorporated community in Minnesota, United States

- Unincorporated community
- Location within Minnesota Location within the United States
- Coordinates: 47°03′58″N 91°41′57″W
- Country: United States
- State: Minnesota
- County: Lake
- Elevation: 1,056 ft (322 m)
- Time zone: UTC-6 (Central (CST))
  - Summer (DST): UTC-5 (CDT)
- ZIP code: 55616
- Area code: 218
- GNIS feature ID: 658880

Waldo is an unincorporated community in Lake County, Minnesota, United States, near Two Harbors and Stewart. It is within Lake No. 2 Unorganized Territory. Waldo is 4 miles north of Two Harbors.
