= Cliffs Erie Railroad =

Railroad in Minnesota, United States

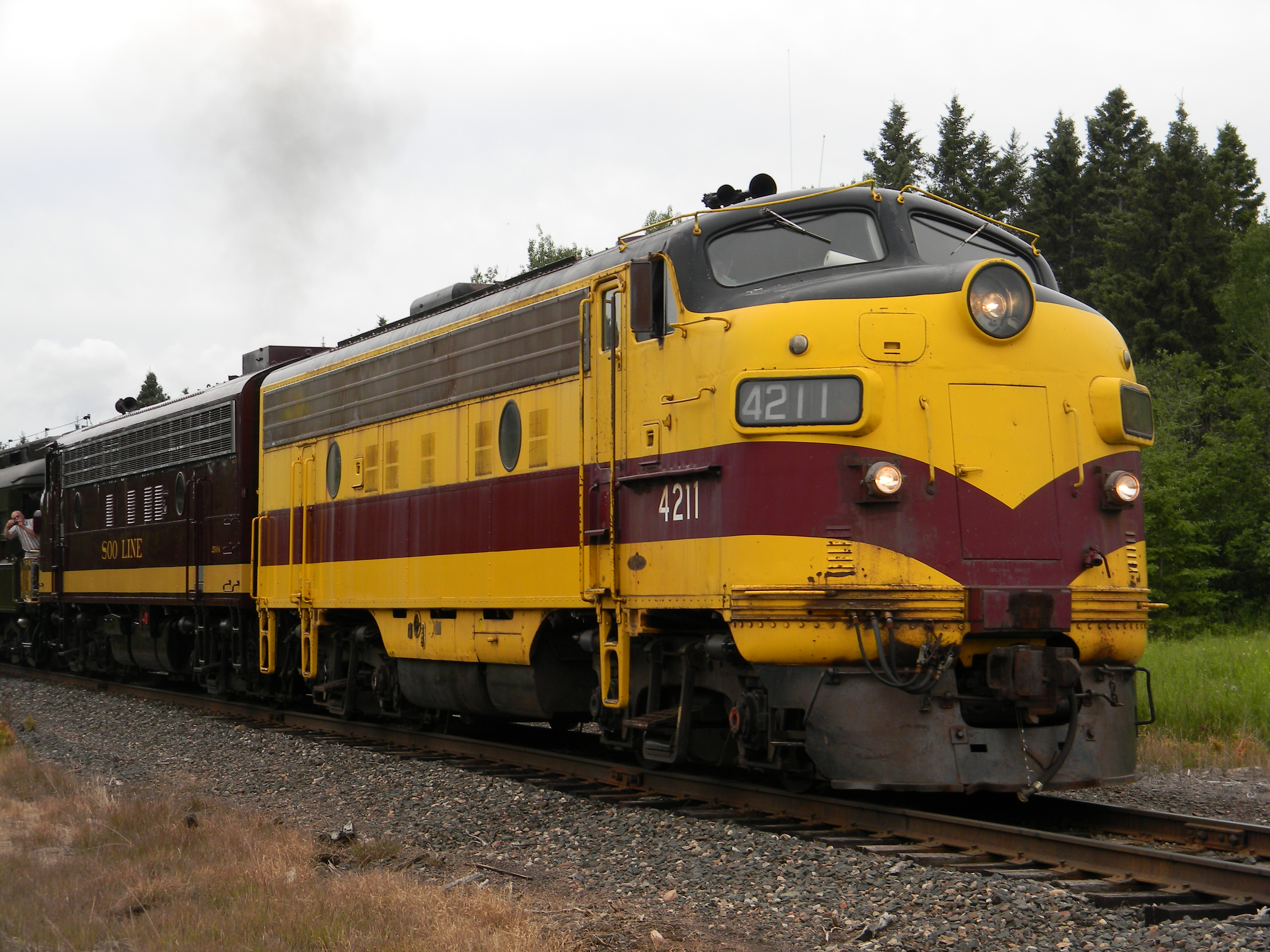
Erie Mining Company 4211 preserved at the Lake Superior Railroad Museum in 2014

The Cliffs Erie Railroad (reporting mark LTVX) was a railroad that operated from Hoyt Lakes to Taconite Harbor, Minnesota. The railroad opened in 1956 by Erie Mining Company to transport taconite from Hoyt Lakes to Taconite Harbor. In 1989, LTV Steel purchased Erie Mining and the railroad was renamed LTV Mining Railroad. The railroad closed in early 2001 when the LTV company ended the operations of the harbor. In 2002 Cleveland Cliffs bought the plant, and again renamed the railroad The Cliffs Erie Railroad (combining the names Erie Mining and Cleveland Cliffs).

In 2004 Cliffs Erie hired a contractor to claim leftover chips and pellets from the mine due to the high iron prices. At that time, the only locomotives still owned by the railroad was a EMD F9A and three EMD F9B units purchased originally by Cliffs Erie over fifty years earlier. For the final freight runs, these locomotives, together with EMD F9 number 4211 that had been donated to Lake Superior Railroad Museum in 2002, were used to form up a A-B-B-B-A consist, rarely seen since the end of the B-unit era. The cleanup trains ran until 2008 when the last train ran. In 2014, the F9s were sold off. The three B units, numbers 4223, 4224, and 4225, were scrapped, while 4210 was stored intact at Hoyt Lakes until being acquired by the Great Smoky Mountains Railroad in North Carolina.

The railroad is now sitting, unlikely to ever see activity again.

Two former Erie Mining Company ALCO RS-11 locomotives #7201 and #7202, ex-301 and #302 respectively, are located near Newport, NJ among other retired rolling stock on a private railroad siding.

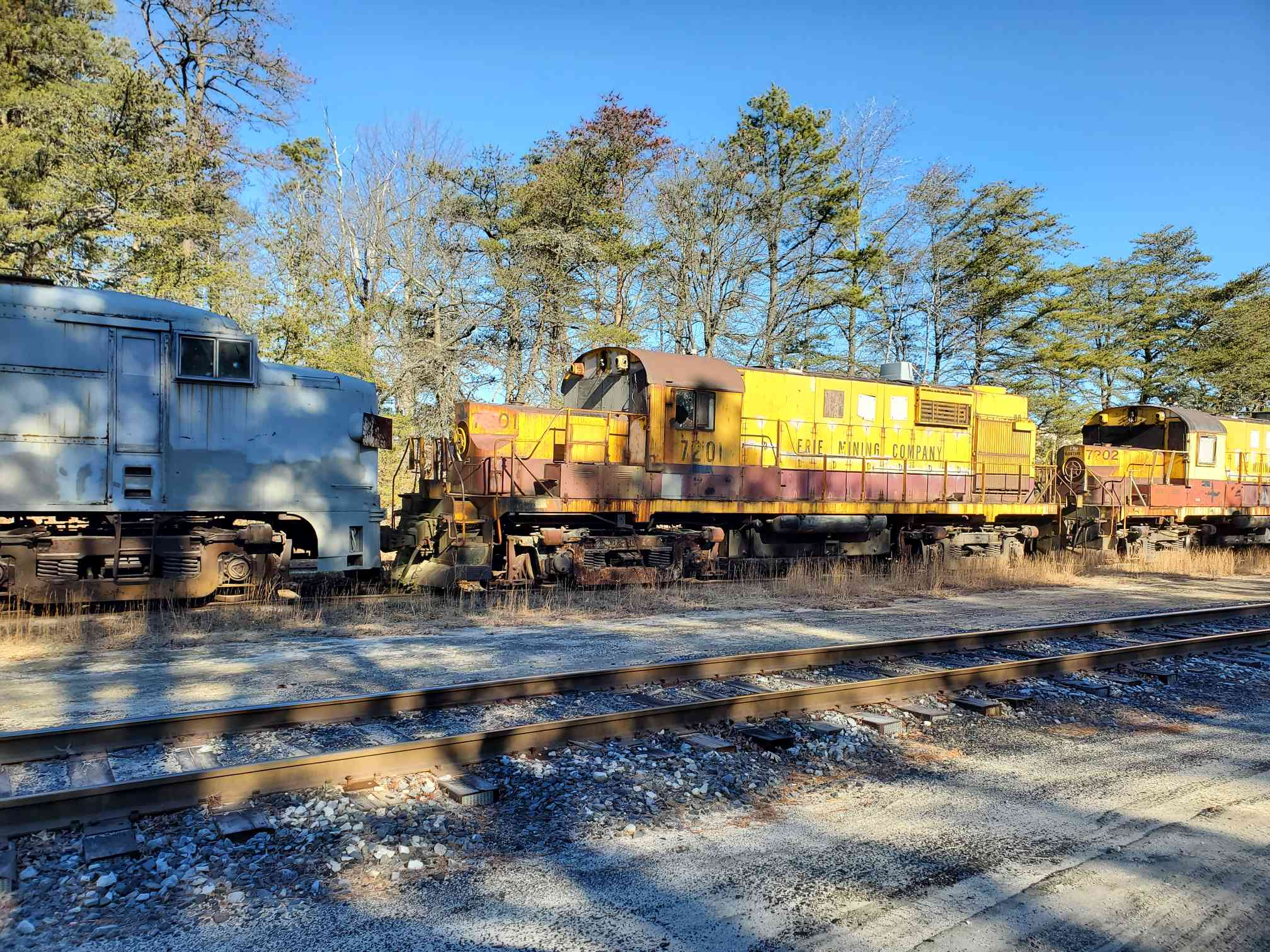
Erie Mining Company 301 & 302 (Renumbered to 7201 & 7202 by ALGX) rotting away on a WW Deadline in Dividing Creek, NJ in 2022

== Features ==
The railroad was the last to use F9 units in revenue service in the United States, until Indiana Boxcar Corporation purchased two F9s for use on the Vermilion Valley Railroad in western Indiana/eastern Illinois. It also had some of the last few Griswold rotating signals in full operation (now removed). It also featured a 100-foot-long trestle and the Cramer Tunnel.
