= Biwabik =

Biwabik can refer to a location in the United States:

- Biwabik, Minnesota, a city
- Biwabik Township, St. Louis County, Minnesota
