= Toimi =

Toimi is a Finnish masculine given name that may refer to

- Toimi Alatalo (1929–2014), Finnish cross-country skier
- Toimi Jarvi (1920–1977), American football player
- Toimi Kankaanniemi (born 1950), Finnish politician
- Toimi Pitkänen (1928–2016), Finnish rower

== See also ==
- Toimi, Minnesota, an unincorporated community in the United States
