= Cramer Tunnel =

Railroad tunnel in Minnesota, United States

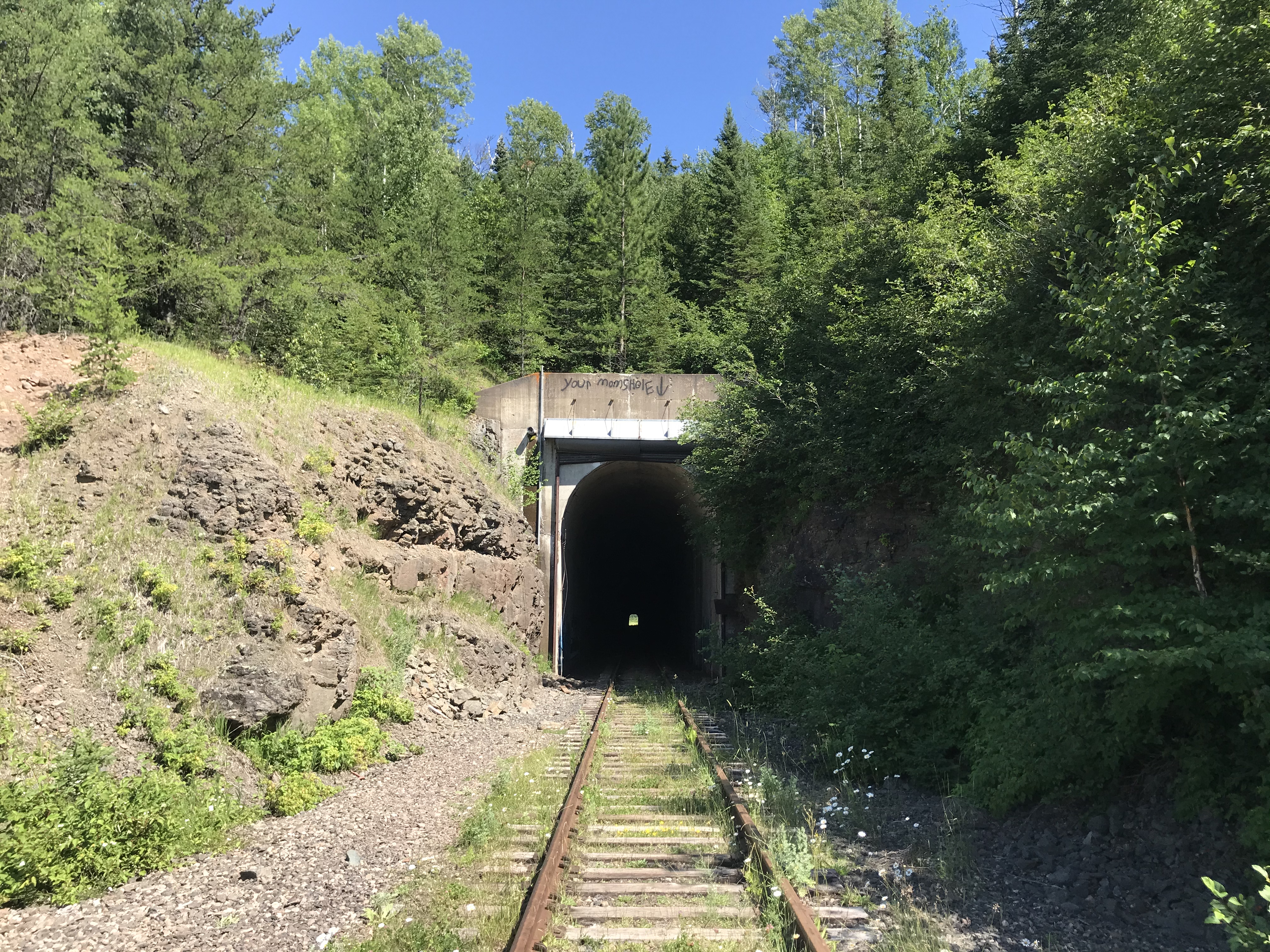
- Interactive map of Cramer Tunnel

Overview
- Coordinates: 47.53667°N 91.07815°W
- Status: Out of Service

Operation
- Opened: 1957
- Closed: 2008

Technical
- Length: 1,800 ft (550 m)
- No. of tracks: Single

Cramer Tunnel is a disused railroad tunnel near Cramer, Minnesota. It is the longest railway tunnel in Minnesota.

== History ==
Cramer Tunnel opened in 1957 after LTV Steel blasted a tunnel to connect Hoyt Lakes taconite plant and the location of its ore dock at Taconite Harbor on Lake Superior, from which the taconite was shipped to eastern steel mills. The tunnel was used consistently from its opening in 1957 until 2001, when LTV Steel went bankrupt and closed their ore dock in Taconite Harbor. When the land was bought by Cleveland Cliffs in 2002, cleanup trains ran on the line to pick up leftover chips and pellets until 2008.
