= Stewart River =

Stewart River may refer to:

- Stewart River (Queensland), a river located in Far North Queensland, Australia
- Stewart River (Yukon), a river located in the Yukon Territory, Canada
- Stewart River (Minnesota), a river located in Minnesota, United States

== See also ==
- Stuart River (disambiguation)
