= Tikander Lake, Minnesota =

Unorganized territory in St. Louis County, Minnesota, United States

Coordinates: 47°24′55″N 92°22′05″W

Tikander Lake is an unorganized territory in Saint Louis County, Minnesota, United States. The population was 783 at the 2000 census.

Nearby places include Fayal Township, Biwabik Township, White Township, Palo, and Makinen.

== Geography ==
According to the United States Census Bureau, the unorganized territory has a total area of 36.3 square miles (94.1 km^{2}); 35.0 square miles (90.6 km^{2}) is land and 1.4 square miles (3.5 km^{2}) (3.77%) is water.

== Demographics ==
At the 2000 United States census, there were 783 people, 306 households, and 234 families living in the unorganized territory. The population density was 22.4 inhabitants per square mile (8.6/km^{2}). There were 372 housing units at an average density of 10.6 per square mile (4.1/km^{2}). The racial makeup of the unorganized territory was 98.21% White, 0.38% Native American, 0.38% Asian, 0.13% Pacific Islander, and 0.89% from two or more races. Of the 306 households 29.7% had children under the age of 18 living with them, 69.6% were married couples living together, 3.9% had a female householder with no husband present, and 23.5% were non-families. 19.6% of households were one person and 7.5% were one person aged 65 or older. The average household size was 2.56 and the average family size was 2.91.

The age distribution was 23.0% under the age of 18, 6.8% from 18 to 24, 24.9% from 25 to 44, 34.7% from 45 to 64, and 10.6% 65 or older. The median age was 43 years. For every 100 females, there were 109.9 males. For every 100 females age 18 and over, there were 110.1 males.

The median household income was $46,012 and the median family income was $48,523. Males had a median income of $39,479 versus $28,542 for females. The per capita income for the unorganized territory was $21,061. About 3.8% of families and 4.3% of the population were below the poverty line, including 2.1% of those under age 18 and 4.5% of those age 65 or over.
