= Stuart River =

Stuart River may refer to:

- Stuart River (Queensland), a river located in the Wide Bay–Burnett region of Queensland, Australia
- Stuart River (Canada), a river located in northeastern British Columbia, Canada
- Stuart River (Minnesota), a river located in Minnesota, United States

== See also ==
- Stewart River (disambiguation)
