= Pineville, Minnesota =

Pineville
- Unincorporated community
- Location within Minnesota Location within the United States
- Coordinates: 47°32′10″N 92°17′39″W
- Country: United States
- State: Minnesota
- County: Saint Louis
- Township: White Township
- Elevation: 1,437 ft (438 m)
- Time zone: UTC-6 (Central (CST))
  - Summer (DST): UTC-5 (CDT)
- ZIP code: 55705
- Area code: 218
- GNIS feature ID: 662204

Pineville is an unincorporated community in White Township, Saint Louis County, Minnesota, United States, near Biwabik and Aurora. It is along State Highway 135 (MN 135) near County Road 138.
