= McNair, Minnesota =

Unincorporated community in Minnesota, United States

- Unincorporated community
- Location within Minnesota Location within the United States
- Coordinates: 47°19′12″N 91°40′22″W
- Country: United States
- State: Minnesota
- County: Lake
- Elevation: 1,670 ft (510 m)
- Time zone: UTC-6 (Central (CST))
  - Summer (DST): UTC-5 (CDT)
- Area code: 218
- GNIS feature ID: 657367

McNair is an unincorporated community in Lake County, Minnesota, United States. The community is located 20 miles north of the city of Two Harbors at the intersection of Lake County Highway 2 and Langley River Road, Forest Road 122.

Lake County Road 203, Kane Lake Road, is nearby. McNair is located within the Superior National Forest; and is also located within Lake No. 2 Unorganized Territory of Lake County.

== Arts and culture ==
The annual McNair Butterfly Count near McNair is held in early July. The event is organized for the purpose of identifying and counting butterflies in a specific area. The research data gathered during a count can indicate population changes and health within a species. The management of the nearby McNair Butterfly Area has been a cooperative project between the Minnesota DNR and the USDA Forest Service with initial support from the Nature Conservancy.
