= Stewart River (Minnesota) =

- Mouth of the Stewart River

Location
- Country: United States
- State: Minnesota
- County: Lake County

Physical characteristics
- Source
  - location: Highland, Minnesota
  - coordinates: 47.1874276°N 91.7418416°W
- Mouth
  - location: Two Harbors, Minnesota
  - coordinates: 47°02′51″N 91°37′50″W

Stewart River is a stream in Lake County, in the U.S. state of Minnesota.

Stewart River was named for John Stewart, a pioneer who settled near the river in the 1850s.

== See also ==
- List of rivers of Minnesota
