= Skibo, Minnesota =

Skibo
- Unincorporated community
- Location within Minnesota Location within the United States
- Coordinates: 47°29′08″N 91°59′40″W
- Country: United States
- State: Minnesota
- County: Saint Louis
- Township: Bassett Township
- Elevation: 1,585 ft (483 m)

Population
  - Total: 10
- Time zone: UTC-6 (Central (CST))
  - Summer (DST): UTC-5 (CDT)
- ZIP codes: 55750
- Area code: 218
- GNIS feature ID: 662465

Skibo is an unincorporated community in Bassett Township, Saint Louis County, Minnesota, United States.

== Geography ==
The community is located eight miles east of Hoyt Lakes, near Saint Louis County Road 110 (CR 110). Skibo is located within the Superior National Forest. Bird Lake Recreation Area and the Saint Louis River are both nearby.

== History ==
Skibo contained a post office between 1902 and 1919. The community was named after Skibo Castle in Scotland. As of July 2019, Skibo remains disconnected from power lines, requiring its residents to be self-reliant through the use of alternative energy sources.
