= Highland, Lake County, Minnesota =

Unincorporated community in Minnesota, United States

Highland, Minnesota
- Unincorporated community
- Location within Minnesota Location within the United States
- Coordinates: 47°12′18″N 91°43′10″W
- Country: United States
- State: Minnesota
- County: Lake
- Elevation: 1,650 ft (500 m)

Population
  - Total: 20
- Time zone: UTC-6 (Central (CST))
  - Summer (DST): UTC-5 (CDT)
- Area code: 218
- GNIS feature ID: 654756

Highland is an unincorporated community in Lake County, Minnesota, United States.

The community is located 16 miles north of the city of Two Harbors near the intersection of Lake County Road 14 (Wales Road) and Highland Lake Road.

Lake County Highway 2 is in the area. Highland is also known unofficially by the name Marcy.

The unincorporated communities of Wales and Brimson are nearby.

Highland is located within Lake No. 2 Unorganized Territory of Lake County.

Highland was named for its lofty elevation.
