= Stewart, Lake County, Minnesota =

Unincorporated community in Minnesota, United States

Stewart, Minnesota
- Unincorporated community
- Location within Minnesota Location within the United States
- Coordinates: 47°06′12″N 91°42′34″W
- Country: United States
- State: Minnesota
- County: Lake
- Elevation: 1,250 ft (380 m)
- Time zone: UTC-6 (Central (CST))
  - Summer (DST): UTC-5 (CDT)
- ZIP code: 55616
- Area code: 218
- GNIS feature ID: 658477

Stewart is an unincorporated community in Lake County, Minnesota, United States. It is a surrounding community of Two Harbors.

The community is located seven miles north of the city of Two Harbors at the intersection of Lake County Roads 124 and 132.

Lake County Roads 12 and 111 are also in the immediate area. Stewart is located within Lake No. 2 Unorganized Territory of Lake County. The Stewart River flows through the community. The Two Harbors–Richard B. Helgeson Airport is nearby.

Stewart is located within ZIP code 55616 based in Two Harbors.
