= Biwabik Township, St. Louis County, Minnesota =

Biwabik Township, Minnesota
- Township
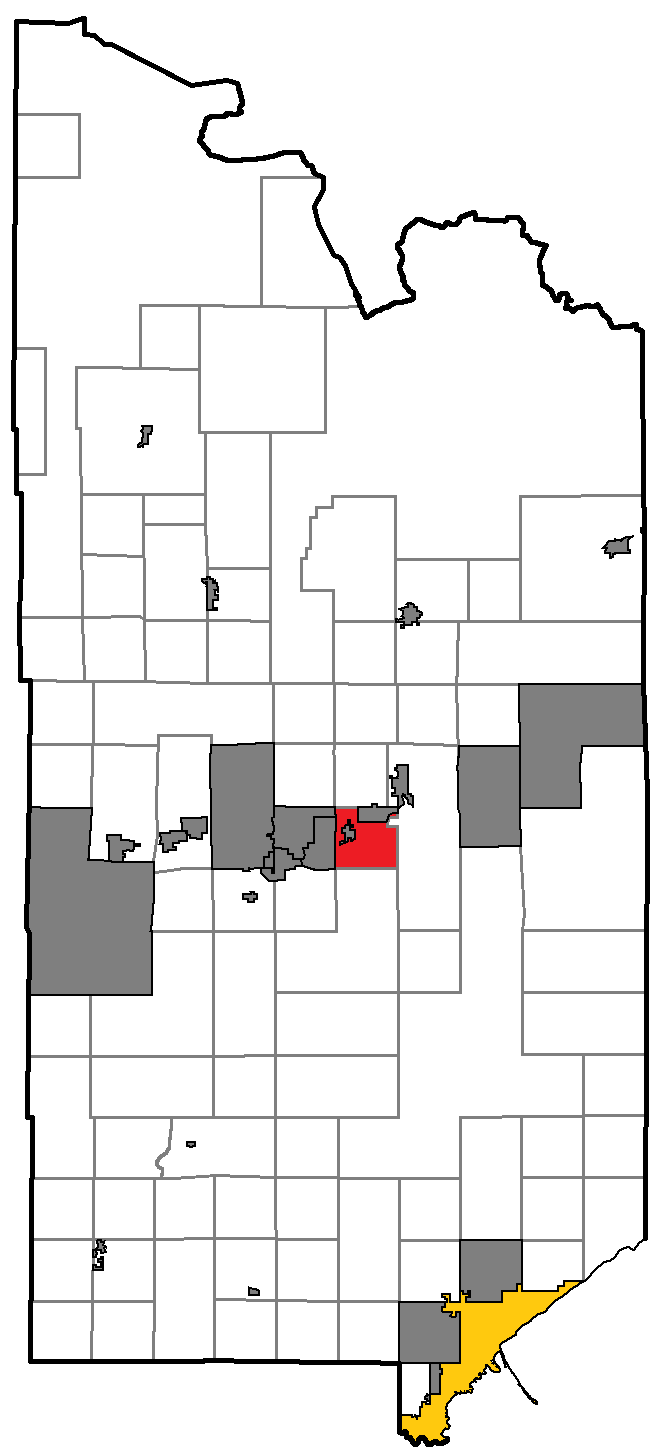
- Location of Biwabik Township within St. Louis County, Minnesota
- Coordinates: 47°28′36″N 92°22′47″W
- Country: United States
- State: Minnesota
- County: Saint Louis

Area
  - Total: 29.4 sq mi (76.1 km^{2})
  - Land: 27.1 sq mi (70.2 km^{2})
  - Water: 2.3 sq mi (5.9 km^{2})
- Elevation: 1,385 ft (422 m)

Population (2020)
  - Total: 833
  - Density: 30.7/sq mi (11.9/km^{2})
- Time zone: UTC-6 (Central (CST))
  - Summer (DST): UTC-5 (CDT)
- FIPS code: 27-06166
- GNIS feature ID: 0663605
- Website: https://www.biwabiktownship.gov/

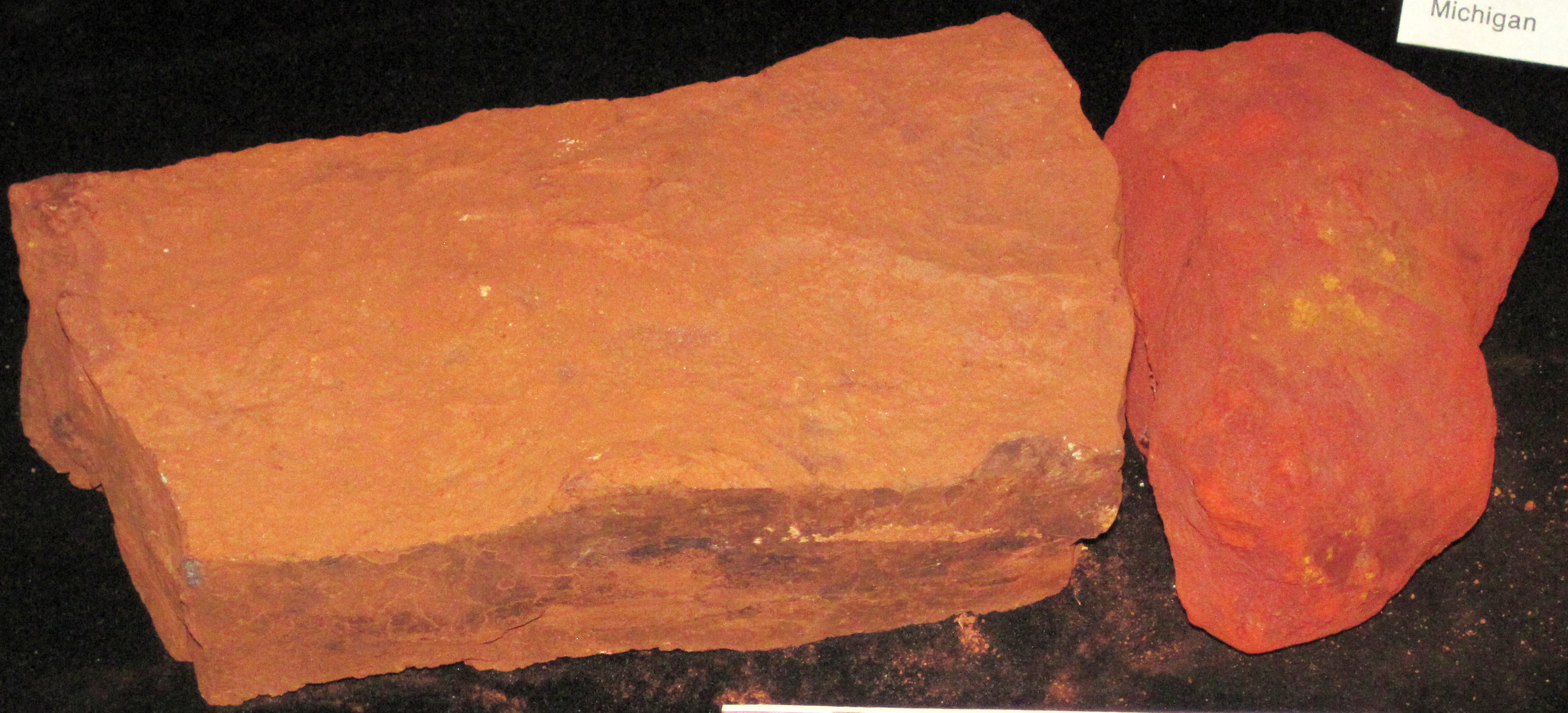
Hematite iron ore from the Biwabik Iron-Formation, Whiteside Mine, Buhl, Minnesota

Biwabik Township is a township in Saint Louis County, Minnesota, United States. Biwabik is a name derived from the Ojibwe language meaning "iron". The population was 833 at the 2020 census.

State Highway 135 (MN 135) and Vermilion Trail (County 4) are two of the main routes in the township.

Other routes include Saint Louis County Roads 20 (Heritage Trail) and 97.

The city of Biwabik is located within the northeast part of Biwabik Township geographically but is a separate entity.

The city of McKinley is located within the northwest part of the township geographically but is a separate entity.

== Geography ==
According to the United States Census Bureau, the township has a total area of 29.4 square miles (76 km^{2}); 27.1 square miles (70 km^{2}) is land and 2.3 square miles (6.0 km^{2}), or 7.72%, is water.

The Pike River flows through the northwest corner of Biwabik Township.

The Saint Louis River flows through the southeast corner of the township.

=== Adjacent townships, cities, and communities ===
The following are adjacent to Biwabik Township :

- The city of Biwabik (north-northeast)
- The city of Virginia (west-northwest)
- The city of Gilbert (west)
- Fayal Township (southwest)
- Tikander Lake Unorganized Territory (south)
- White Township (southeast, east, and northeast)
- The unincorporated community of Palo (southeast)
- The city of Aurora (northeast)
- Hay Lake Unorganized Territory (north)
- Wuori Township (northwest)

County 97 runs east–west along Biwabik Township's southern boundary line with adjacent Tikander Lake Unorganized Territory in the southwest corner of Biwabik Township. Faber Road runs east–west along the township's southern boundary line in the southeast corner of Biwabik Township.

== Demographics ==
As of the census of 2000, there were 911 people, 368 households, and 266 families residing in the township. The population density was 33.6 inhabitants per square mile (13.0/km^{2}). There were 499 housing units at an average density of 18.4 per square mile (7.1/km^{2}). The racial makeup of the township was 99.01% White, 0.44% Native American, 0.22% Asian, and 0.33% from two or more races. Hispanic or Latino of any race were 0.55% of the population.

There were 368 households, out of which 27.2% had children under the age of 18 living with them, 63.6% were married couples living together, 3.0% had a female householder with no husband present, and 27.7% were non-families. 23.9% of all households were made up of individuals, and 10.3% had someone living alone who was 65 years of age or older. The average household size was 2.47 and the average family size was 2.90.

In the township the population was spread out, with 23.1% under the age of 18, 5.9% from 18 to 24, 26.9% from 25 to 44, 28.1% from 45 to 64, and 16.0% who were 65 years of age or older. The median age was 42 years. For every 100 females, there were 116.9 males. For every 100 females age 18 and over, there were 114.4 males.

The median income for a household in the township was $44,375, and the median income for a family was $50,069. Males had a median income of $40,231 versus $25,625 for females. The per capita income for the township was $19,435. About 8.0% of families and 8.0% of the population were below the poverty line, including 4.8% of those under age 18 and 8.2% of those age 65 or over.
