= Toimi, Minnesota =

Unincorporated community in Minnesota, United States

- Unincorporated community
- Location within Minnesota Location within the United States
- Coordinates: 47°24′02″N 91°46′04″W
- Country: United States
- State: Minnesota
- County: Lake
- Elevation: 1,752 ft (534 m)

Population
  - Total: 10
- Time zone: UTC-6 (Central (CST))
  - Summer (DST): UTC-5 (CDT)
- Area code: 218
- GNIS feature ID: 658704

Toimi is an unincorporated community in Lake County, Minnesota, United States. The community is located 31 miles north of the city of Two Harbors at the intersection of Lake County Highway 15 / Forest Highway 11 (co-signed) and County Road 151, Etelainen Road.

Toimi is 29 miles west of Silver Bay, and 27 miles southeast of Hoyt Lakes. The boundary line between Lake and Saint Louis counties is nearby.

Toimi is within the Superior National Forest, and also located within Lake No. 2 Unorganized Territory of Lake County.

Store Creek flows through the community. Lake County Highway 2 and Sullivan Lake Campground are both nearby.

The unincorporated communities of Fairbanks and Brimson are also nearby.

== History ==
Primarily Finnish immigrants first settled around the Toimi area in the late 1800s, early 1900s.

Prior to 1913, classes were held in private homes, but that changed when the Toimi School was built in 1913. The building was originally a one-room schoolhouse, but as attendance grew, a second room was added, as well as a living space for teachers.

The Finnish Supply Company was founded around 1914-15.

On 22 May 1928, the Finnish Supply Company split into 2 different factions after a shareholders meeting resulted in the removal of corporate officers. One faction, led by John Koski, claimed that the meeting was uproarious and disorderly, while the faction led by John Kylmanen, claimed that the election was conducted in a proper manner. This case was especially difficult as an interpreter was needed to give testimony on behalf of the plaintiffs and defendants, because they mostly spoke Finnish and their company records were in the same language.

On 26 September 1930, John Kylmanen and his faction were ousted from office for the third time, with the court further directing new elections to be held 12 January 1931.

In October 1931, a special election was held, which resulted in a change in management.

After the Toimi School closed in 1942, the building remained empty until the 1960s, when the county began using it as a garage.

In the 1990s, descendants of the original settlers came together and formed the Toimi School Community Center, restoring the school to what it looked like prior to 1942 with the help of a Finnish architect. It has also been made into a wayside stop and tourist site, being open on Saturdays throughout the summers.

The Toimi School celebrated its 100th anniversary in September 2013.

In 2014, ground-penetrating radar imaging was used at the Toimi Settlers Childrens Cemetery as well as the general Toimi Cemetery to locate not only deteriorated graves, but also unmarked graves that were lost to time. Due to the lack of county records, only 5 children have been plausibly identified. Adrian Ranta, Chairman of the Toimi School Community Center, said "We’re not going to know who they are, but we’ll at least put some kind of marker there to show them some respect.”
