= Petrel, Minnesota =

Petrel
- Unincorporated community
- Location within Minnesota Location within the United States
- Coordinates: 47°21′28″N 91°50′7″W
- Country: United States
- State: Minnesota
- County: Saint Louis
- Township: Fairbanks Township
- Elevation: 1,532 ft (467 m)

Population
  - Total: 10
- Time zone: UTC-6 (Central (CST))
  - Summer (DST): UTC-5 (CDT)
- Area code: 218
- GNIS feature ID: 662165

Petrel (also spelled Petrell) is an unincorporated community in Fairbanks Township, Saint Louis County, Minnesota, United States; located within the Superior National Forest.

The community is located east of Fairbanks, and north of Brimson, near the intersection of Saint Louis County Highway 44 and County Road 353, Little Creek Road. Nearby is the junction of County Highway 44 and County Highway 16.

Petrel is located near the boundary line for Saint Louis and Lake counties.
