= Markham, Minnesota =

Markham
- Unincorporated community
- Location within Minnesota Location within the United States
- Coordinates: 47°17′57″N 92°13′07″W
- Country: United States
- State: Minnesota
- County: Saint Louis
- Township: Colvin Township
- Elevation: 1,463 ft (446 m)
- Time zone: UTC-6 (Central (CST))
  - Summer (DST): UTC-5 (CDT)
- ZIP code: 55763
- Area code: 218
- GNIS feature ID: 661868

Markham is an unincorporated community in Colvin Township, Saint Louis County, Minnesota, United States.

The community is located between Biwabik and Duluth, near the intersection of County Road 4 (Vermilion Trail) and County Road 108 (Long Lake Road).

Markham is located 19 miles south of the city of Biwabik; and 42 miles north of the city of Duluth.

The Whiteface Reservoir and the Cloquet Valley State Forest in Saint Louis County are both located near Markham.

Residents obtain mail service from the neighboring community of Makinen, ZIP code 55763.

== Geography ==
Markham is located 11 miles southeast of Makinen; and nine miles south of Palo.

Markham's southern border is located 23 miles north of Island Lake on County Road 4 (Governor Rudy Perpich Memorial Drive); and Markham's northern border is County Road 16 (Townline Road), CR 16 serves as a direct east–west route in northeast Minnesota between U.S. Highway 53 and Silver Bay.

== History ==
A post office called Markham was established in 1908, and remained in operation until 1922. The community was named for an early settler.
