= Taconite Harbor, Minnesota =

Unincorporated community in Minnesota, United States

Taconite Harbor
- Unincorporated community
- Location within Minnesota Location within the United States
- Coordinates: 47°31′21″N 90°55′44″W
- Country: United States
- State: Minnesota
- County: Cook
- Elevation: 692 ft (211 m)
- Time zone: UTC-6 (Central (CST))
  - Summer (DST): UTC-5 (CDT)
- Area code: 218
- GNIS feature ID: 658592

Taconite Harbor is an unincorporated community in Schroeder Township, Cook County, Minnesota, United States.

The community is located on the North Shore of Lake Superior. Taconite Harbor is located 33 miles southwest of the city of Grand Marais; and 51 miles northeast of the city of Two Harbors. The community of Schroeder is immediately northeast of Taconite Harbor.

Minnesota Highway 61 serves as a main route in the community. Until 2008, the Cliffs Erie Railroad carried taconite from Hoyt Lakes via 3 railroad bridges over the highway. The tracks and bridges have been since abandoned, and in 2017, a truck hit the middle of the 3 bridges, resulting in the removal of the damaged bridge.

== Development ==
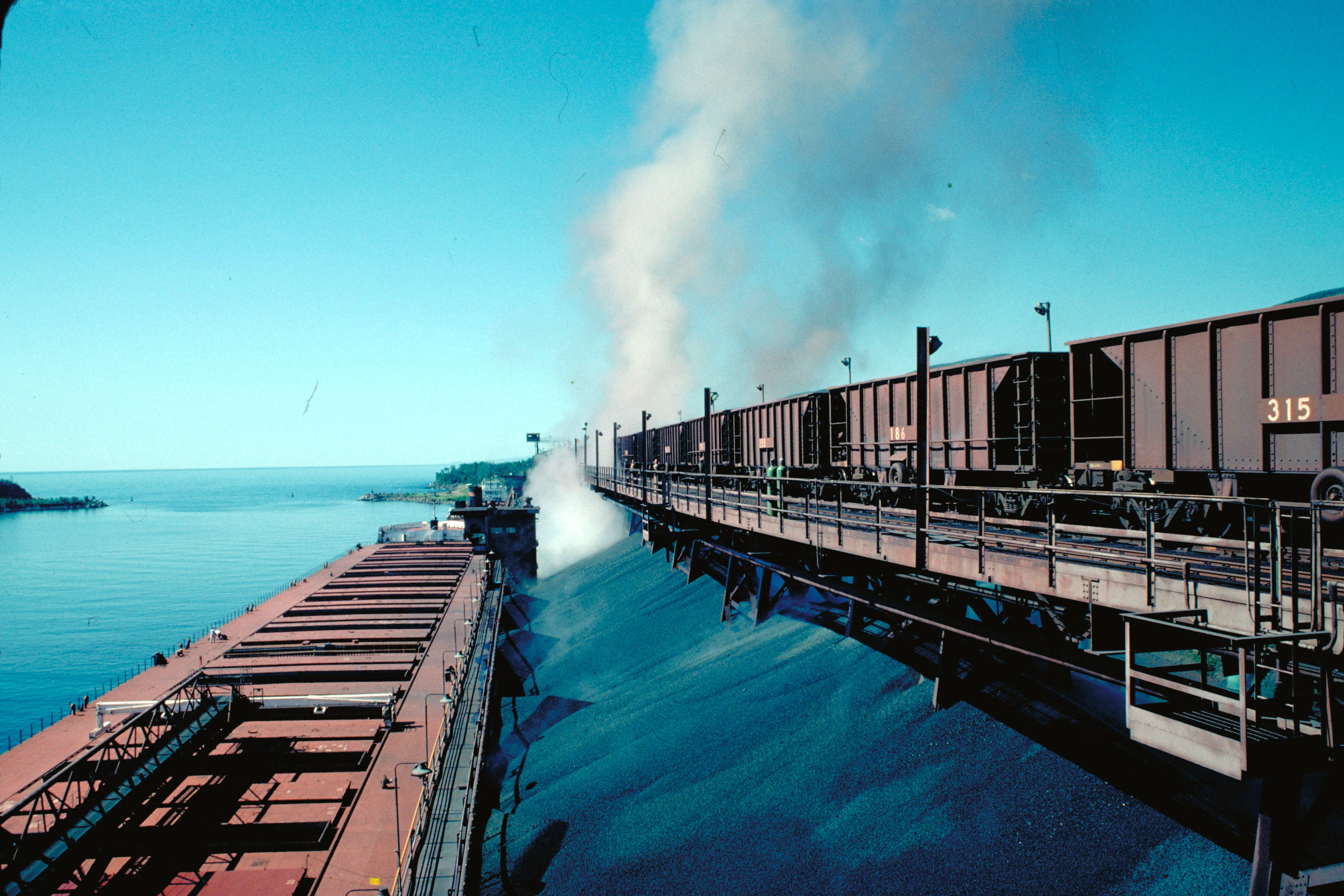
The ore dock at Taconite Harbor

Currently, Taconite Harbor consists of foundations for a power plant that was torn down in 2025 and an abandoned basketball court. As of 2009, the Minnesota Power Company is looking towards development on an area that they own, but do not need. This development may include a sewer system, various commercial businesses centered on a village square, paved parking lots, and a City Hall (which would then make Taconite Harbor an incorporated city). The community is also expected to be a major stop along the Gitchi-Gami State Trail.

== Education ==
All of the county is zoned to Cook County ISD 166.
