= Brimson, Minnesota =

Community in Saint Louis County, Minnesota, U.S.

Brimson
- Unincorporated community
- Location within Minnesota Location within the United States
- Coordinates: 47°16′36″N 91°52′02″W
- Country: United States
- State: Minnesota
- County: Saint Louis
- Township: Ault Township
- Elevation: 1,519 ft (463 m)

Population
  - Total: 40
- Time zone: UTC-6 (Central (CST))
  - Summer (DST): UTC-5 (CDT)
- ZIP code: 55602
- Area code: 218
- GNIS feature ID: 660879

Brimson is an unincorporated community in Ault Township, Saint Louis County, Minnesota, United States.

The community is located 44 miles northeast of the city of Duluth, near the intersection of Saint Louis County Highway 44 and County Road 547 (Brimson Road). Brimson is located 27 miles northwest of the city of Two Harbors. Indian Lake and the Cloquet River are both in the vicinity.

The boundary line between Saint Louis and Lake counties is nearby.

Brimson is located within the Cloquet Valley State Forest in Saint Louis County. The Superior National Forest is also in the vicinity.

Brimson has a volunteer fire department, but it only has access to water hauled by truck since there is no public water system.

The communities of Rollins, Fairbanks, Bassett, Petrel, Toimi, and Wales are all near Brimson.

== History ==
A post office called Brimson has been in operation since 1897. The community was named for W. H. Brimson, a railroad official.

The population of Brimson was 27 in 1920, and was 104 in 1940.

== Climate ==
The Köppen Climate Classification subtype for this climate is "Dfb" (Warm Summer Continental Climate).

Climate data for Brimson 2 S, Minnesota (1991–2020 normals, extremes 1986–present)
| Month | Jan | Feb | Mar | Apr | May | Jun | Jul | Aug | Sep | Oct | Nov | Dec | Year |
|---|---|---|---|---|---|---|---|---|---|---|---|---|---|
| Record high °F (°C) | 49 (9) | 57 (14) | 75 (24) | 82 (28) | 89 (32) | 97 (36) | 99 (37) | 94 (34) | 90 (32) | 84 (29) | 74 (23) | 50 (10) | 99 (37) |
| Mean maximum °F (°C) | 37.5 (3.1) | 43.6 (6.4) | 56.8 (13.8) | 71.1 (21.7) | 82.2 (27.9) | 86.2 (30.1) | 88.5 (31.4) | 86.9 (30.5) | 81.9 (27.7) | 73.3 (22.9) | 53.9 (12.2) | 39.3 (4.1) | 90.3 (32.4) |
| Mean daily maximum °F (°C) | 17.6 (−8.0) | 23.3 (−4.8) | 35.6 (2.0) | 48.2 (9.0) | 62.8 (17.1) | 71.5 (21.9) | 76.3 (24.6) | 74.4 (23.6) | 65.5 (18.6) | 50.3 (10.2) | 34.4 (1.3) | 22.4 (−5.3) | 48.5 (9.2) |
| Daily mean °F (°C) | 7.0 (−13.9) | 10.9 (−11.7) | 23.3 (−4.8) | 36.1 (2.3) | 49.2 (9.6) | 58.5 (14.7) | 63.0 (17.2) | 61.3 (16.3) | 53.4 (11.9) | 40.4 (4.7) | 26.2 (−3.2) | 13.4 (−10.3) | 36.9 (2.7) |
| Mean daily minimum °F (°C) | −3.7 (−19.8) | −1.6 (−18.7) | 11.0 (−11.7) | 24.0 (−4.4) | 35.7 (2.1) | 45.5 (7.5) | 49.8 (9.9) | 48.2 (9.0) | 41.4 (5.2) | 30.5 (−0.8) | 18.0 (−7.8) | 4.3 (−15.4) | 25.3 (−3.7) |
| Mean minimum °F (°C) | −33.9 (−36.6) | −29.6 (−34.2) | −20.4 (−29.1) | 4.4 (−15.3) | 19.7 (−6.8) | 28.6 (−1.9) | 35.8 (2.1) | 33.4 (0.8) | 23.7 (−4.6) | 13.8 (−10.1) | −7.0 (−21.7) | −26.1 (−32.3) | −37.2 (−38.4) |
| Record low °F (°C) | −50 (−46) | −47 (−44) | −41 (−41) | −13 (−25) | 13 (−11) | 24 (−4) | 30 (−1) | 27 (−3) | 18 (−8) | −1 (−18) | −20 (−29) | −43 (−42) | −50 (−46) |
| Average precipitation inches (mm) | 0.96 (24) | 0.94 (24) | 1.23 (31) | 2.18 (55) | 3.07 (78) | 4.02 (102) | 4.08 (104) | 3.55 (90) | 3.42 (87) | 2.73 (69) | 1.69 (43) | 1.30 (33) | 29.17 (741) |
| Average snowfall inches (cm) | 14.1 (36) | 12.0 (30) | 7.8 (20) | 7.2 (18) | 0.3 (0.76) | 0.0 (0.0) | 0.0 (0.0) | 0.0 (0.0) | 0.0 (0.0) | 1.7 (4.3) | 11.1 (28) | 15.6 (40) | 69.8 (177) |
| Average extreme snow depth inches (cm) | 19.0 (48) | 22.6 (57) | 20.3 (52) | 8.9 (23) | 0.1 (0.25) | 0.0 (0.0) | 0.0 (0.0) | 0.0 (0.0) | 0.0 (0.0) | 1.3 (3.3) | 6.3 (16) | 12.5 (32) | 25.1 (64) |
| Average precipitation days (≥ 0.01 in) | 8.7 | 7.0 | 7.8 | 8.8 | 12.4 | 12.3 | 12.1 | 10.3 | 11.3 | 12.0 | 10.0 | 9.5 | 122.2 |
| Average snowy days (≥ 0.1 in) | 8.8 | 7.0 | 5.1 | 3.2 | 0.2 | 0.0 | 0.0 | 0.0 | 0.0 | 1.2 | 6.6 | 9.0 | 41.1 |
Source: NOAA
