= Wales, Minnesota =

Unincorporated community in Minnesota, United States

- Unincorporated community
- Location within Minnesota Location within the United States
- Coordinates: 47°14′06″N 91°44′49″W
- Country: United States
- State: Minnesota
- County: Lake
- Elevation: 1,644 ft (501 m)

Population
  - Total: 10
- Time zone: UTC-6 (Central (CST))
  - Summer (DST): UTC-5 (CDT)
- Area code: 218
- GNIS feature ID: 654515

Wales is an unincorporated community in Lake County, Minnesota, United States.

The community is located 18 miles north of the city of Two Harbors at the intersection of Lake County Road 14 (Wales Road) and Wickholm Road. The boundary line between Lake and Saint Louis counties is nearby.

Wales is located within Lake No. 2 Unorganized Territory of Lake County.

Lake County Highway 2 is in the area. The unincorporated communities of Highland and Brimson are nearby.
