= Makinen, Minnesota =

Makinen
- Unincorporated community
- Location within Minnesota Location within the United States
- Coordinates: 47°21′26″N 92°22′04″W
- Country: United States
- State: Minnesota
- County: Saint Louis
- Elevation: 1,401 ft (427 m)
- Time zone: UTC-6 (Central (CST))
  - Summer (DST): UTC-5 (CDT)
- ZIP code: 55763
- Area code: 218
- GNIS feature ID: 661852

Makinen is an unincorporated community in St. Louis County, Minnesota, United States.

The community is located 18 miles (29 km) southeast of the city of Virginia, and 14 miles (23 km) southeast of the city of Eveleth, at the intersection of Saint Louis County Road 16 and County Road 108.

U.S. Highway 53 is nearby.

== Geography ==
The center of Makinen is located at the intersection of Wilson Road (County Road 16) and Long Lake Road (County Road 108). The Makinen Post Office (ZIP code 55763), Makinen Community Center, and the Makinen Market (closed July 2016) are in this vicinity.

County Road 16 takes a northern jog near the center of Makinen. This section of County Road 16 underwent re-construction and re-routing from 2006 to 2008. The former "corner" intersection has been rounded out so travelers on County Road 16 no longer have to slow down as much.

Mud Hen Creek flows through the community.

Markham and Palo are other nearby communities, from which some residents obtain mail service from Makinen.

== Demographics ==
According to the U.S. Census website, the population of Makinen in 2010 was 554 people. This appears to represent the U.S. Census Tract area [ZCTA], and not the actual ZIP Code area.

== Education ==
Most students in grades K through twelve attend classes either in nearby Cherry or Aurora. Many Makinen students attended school in Cotton until 2011, when the Cotton School was closed. Other nearby communities include Eveleth, Gilbert, Biwabik, and Virginia.

== History ==
Finnish farming developed next in the region to the west of McDavitt Township, in the townships of Lavell and Cherry. The most important Finnish clusters developed in Cherry (Alavus), Corbin, Forbes, Makinen and the Saint Louis River, while lesser numbers of Finns were scattered throughout the whole region. Makinen received its name from John Makinen who, together with John Kovaniemi, kept a store and post office there from 1905 onwards.

Makinen held a "Diamond Jubilee" celebration in 1975, and a centennial celebration in 2000.

A historic Finnish pioneer farm is located in southeastern Makinen, once owned by Eli Wirtanen. The surrounding community hosts a Wirtanen Pioneer Farm festival that takes place for one weekend in September each year.
