= Rollins, Minnesota =

Rollins
- Unincorporated community
- Location within Minnesota Location within the United States
- Coordinates: 47°15′24″N 91°50′43″W
- Country: United States
- State: Minnesota
- County: Saint Louis
- Township: Ault Township
- Elevation: 1,499 ft (457 m)

Population
  - Total: 20
- Time zone: UTC-6 (Central (CST))
  - Summer (DST): UTC-5 (CDT)
- ZIP code: 55602
- Area code: 218
- GNIS feature ID: 662293

Rollins is an unincorporated community in Ault Township, Saint Louis County, Minnesota, United States.

== Geography ==
The community is located 41 miles northeast of the city of Duluth at the intersection of Saint Louis County Highway 44 and County Road 55 (Two Harbors–Brimson Road). Rollins is located 23 miles northwest of the city of Two Harbors. The boundary line between Lake and Saint Louis counties is nearby.

Rollins is located within the Cloquet Valley State Forest in Saint Louis County. The Cloquet River flows through the community.

== History ==
Rollins bears the name of an early lumberman who worked in the area.
