= Palo, Minnesota =

Palo
- Unincorporated community
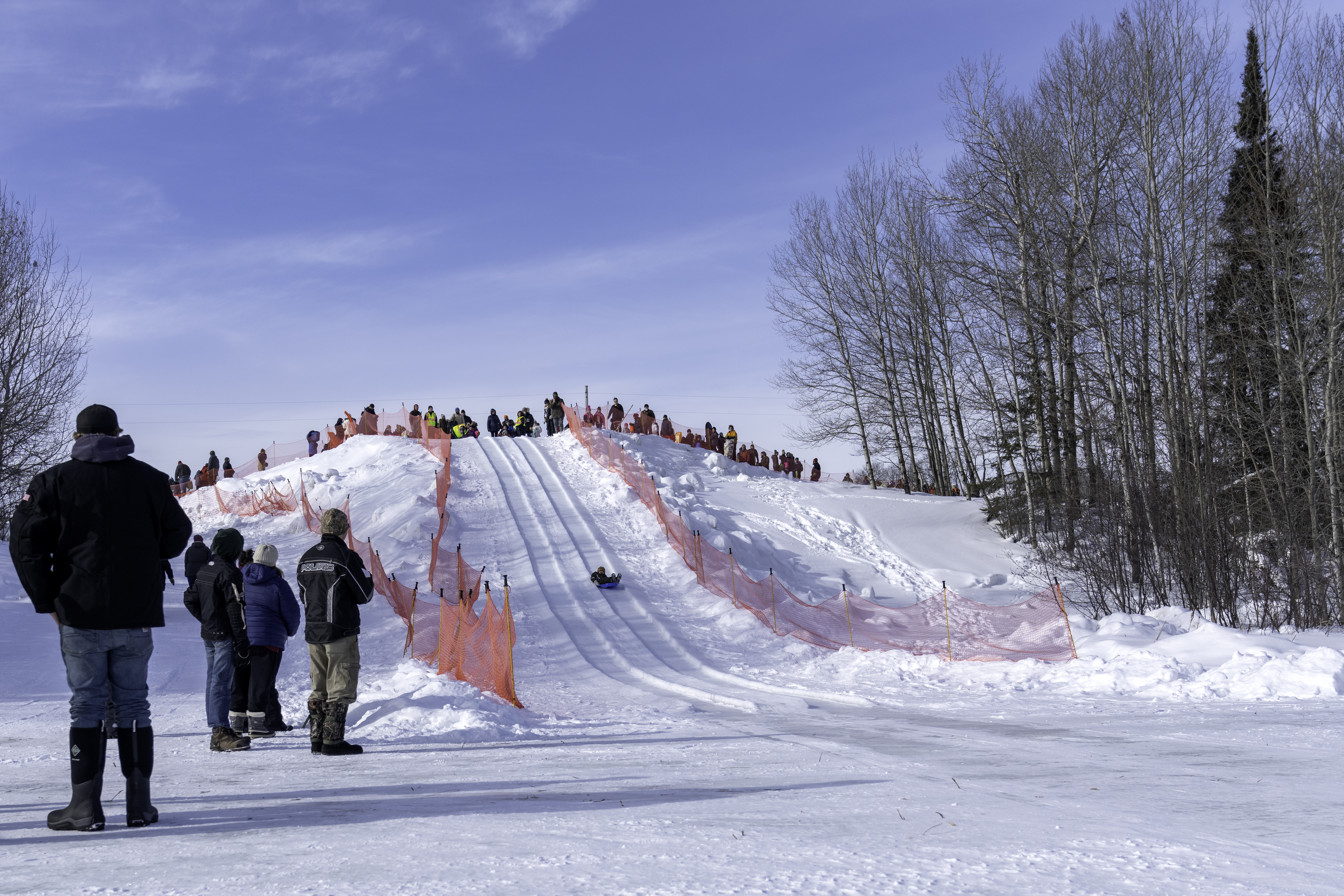
- Ice slide at Laskiainen

- Location within Minnesota Location within the United States
- Coordinates: 47°24′55″N 92°15′35″W
- Country: United States
- State: Minnesota
- County: Saint Louis
- Township: White Township
- Elevation: 1,401 ft (427 m)

Population
  - Total: 30
- Time zone: UTC-6 (Central (CST))
  - Summer (DST): UTC-5 (CDT)
- ZIP code: 55705
- Area code: 218
- GNIS feature ID: 662129

Palo is an unincorporated community in White Township, Saint Louis County, Minnesota, United States.

== Geography ==
The community is located eight miles south of the city of Aurora at the intersection of Saint Louis County Road 100 and County Road 111 (Palo Road). Vermilion Trail/County Road 4 and County Road 16 are both nearby. Palo is located nine miles northeast of the community of Makinen.

== History ==
A post office called Palo was established in 1907, and remained in operation until 1933. The name "Palo" is derived from Finnish, where palo means 'fire' (as in 'forest fire') and Palo is a surname and a place name.

== Arts and culture ==
Palo is notable for its annual Laskiainen celebration, one of the largest and longest-running Finnish-American festivals in the United States.
