= Hush Lake, Minnesota =

Unorganized territory in St. Louis County, Minnesota, United States

Hush Lake is an unorganized territory in Saint Louis County, Minnesota, United States. As of the 2000 census, the unorganized territory had a total population of three.

== Geography ==
According to the United States Census Bureau, the unorganized territory has a total area of 125.1 km^{2} (48.3 sq mi), of which 122.8 km^{2} (47.4 sq mi) is land and 2.3 km^{2} (0.89 sq mi) is water. The total area is 1.84% water.

== Demographics ==
At the 2000 United States census, there were three people, two households, and one family residing in the unorganized territory. The population density was 0.0 people/km^{2} (0 people/mi^{2}). There were four housing units at an average density of 0.0 units/km^{2} (0 units/mi^{2}). The racial makeup of the unorganized territory was 100.00% White. There were two households, out of which none had children under the age of 18 living with them, one was a married couple living together, and one was a non-family. One household was made up of individuals, and none had someone living alone who was 65 or older. The average household size was 1.5 and the average family size was 2.

The age distribution was 66.7% from 25 to 44 and 33.3% from 45 to 64. The median age was 44 years. For every 100 females, there were 200 males. For every 100 females age 18 and over, there were 200 males. However, since there were only three people, this means that there was one woman and two men.

The median household income was $31,250 and the median family income was $31,250. Males had a median income of $31,250 versus $0 for females. The per capita income for the unorganized territory was $15,550. 0.0% of the population and 0.0% of families were below the poverty line.
