= Lake No. 2, Minnesota =

Unorganized territory of Lake County, Minnesota, United States

Coordinates: 47°18′22″N 91°42′57″W

Lake No. 2
- Unorganized territory
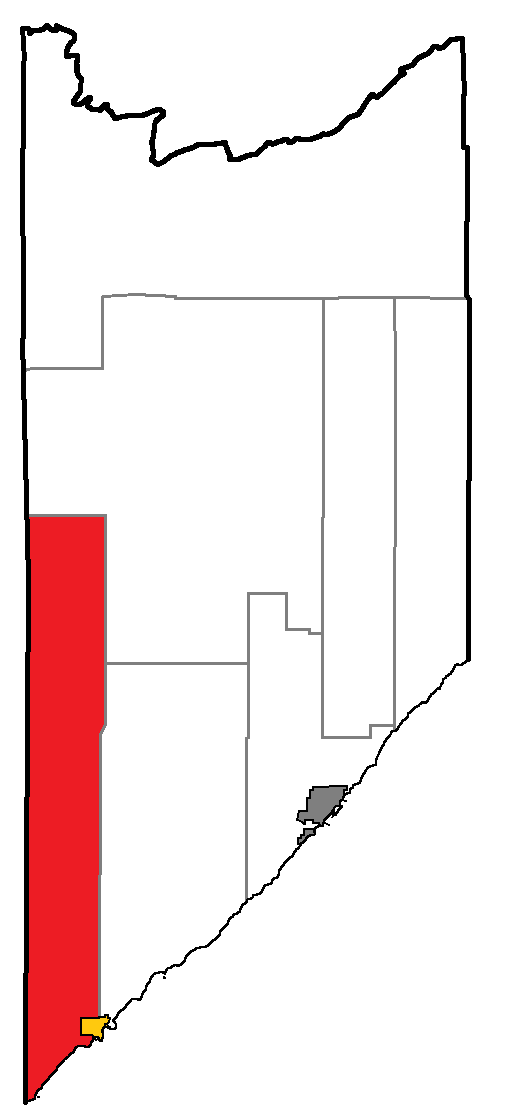
- Location of Lake No. 2 within Lake County, Minnesota
- Country: United States
- State: Minnesota
- County: Lake

Area
  - Total: 272.3 sq mi (705.2 km^{2})
  - Land: 268.4 sq mi (695.2 km^{2})
  - Water: 3.9 sq mi (10.0 km^{2})

Population (2020)
  - Total: 2,207
  - Density: 8.222/sq mi (3.175/km^{2})
- Time zone: UTC-6 (Central (CST))
  - Summer (DST): UTC-5 (CDT)
- Area code: 218

Lake No. 2 is an unorganized territory in Lake County, Minnesota, United States. The population was 2,207 at the 2020 census.

== Geography ==
According to the United States Census Bureau, the unorganized territory has a total area of 272.3 square miles (705.2 km^{2}), of which 268.4 square miles (695.2 km^{2}) of it is land and 3.9 square miles (10.0 km^{2}) of it (1.42%) is water.

=== Unincorporated communities ===
The following unincorporated communities are located within Lake No. 2 Unorganized Territory:

- Highland
- Knife River
- Larsmont
- McNair
- Stewart
- Toimi
- Waldo
- Wales

== Demographics ==
As of the census of 2000, there were 1,955 people, 800 households, and 571 families residing in the unorganized territory. The population density was 7.3 inhabitants per square mile (2.8/km^{2}). There were 1,096 housing units at an average density of 4.1 per square mile (1.6/km^{2}). The racial makeup of the unorganized territory was 98.93% White, 0.36% Native American, 0.15% Asian, 0.26% from other races, and 0.31% from two or more races. Hispanic or Latino of any race were 0.51% of the population.

There were 800 households, out of which 28.0% had children under the age of 18 living with them, 64.9% were married couples living together, 4.3% had a female householder with no husband present, and 28.6% were non-families. 23.4% of all households were made up of individuals, and 10.4% had someone living alone who was 65 years of age or older. The average household size was 2.43 and the average family size was 2.90.

In the unorganized territory the population was spread out, with 22.3% under the age of 18, 6.2% from 18 to 24, 25.3% from 25 to 44, 30.8% from 45 to 64, and 15.4% who were 65 years of age or older. The median age was 43 years. For every 100 females, there were 107.1 males. For every 100 females age 18 and over, there were 112.0 males.

The median income for a household in the unorganized territory was $48,098, and the median income for a family was $50,921. Males had a median income of $42,917 versus $24,803 for females. The per capita income for the unorganized territory was $23,436. About 4.5% of families and 5.2% of the population were below the poverty line, including 3.8% of those under age 18 and 8.3% of those age 65 or over.
