= Linwood Lake, St. Louis County, Minnesota =

Unorganized territory of St. Louis County, Minnesota

Coordinates: 47°16′14″N 92°09′14″W

Linwood Lake is an unorganized territory in Saint Louis County, Minnesota, United States. The population was 54 at the 2000 census.

== Geography ==
According to the United States Census Bureau, the unorganized territory has a total area of 107.9 square miles (279.4 km^{2}), of which 101.2 square miles (262.2 km^{2}) is land and 6.7 square miles (17.2 km^{2}) (6.17%) is water.

== Demographics ==
At the 2000 United States census there were 54 people, 24 households, and 19 families living in the unorganized territory. The population density was 0.5 inhabitants per square mile (0.19/km^{2}). There were 324 housing units at an average density of 3.2 per square mile (1.2/km^{2}). The racial makeup of the unorganized territory was 100.00% White. Of the 24 households 16.7% had children under the age of 18 living with them, 75.0% were married couples living together, and 20.8% were non-families. 16.7% of households were one person and 8.3% were one person aged 65 or older. The average household size was 2.25 and the average family size was 2.53.

The age distribution was 14.8% under the age of 18, 5.6% from 18 to 24, 22.2% from 25 to 44, 42.6% from 45 to 64, and 14.8% 65 or older. The median age was 50 years. For every 100 females, there were 134.8 males. For every 100 females age 18 and over, there were 130.0 males.

The median household income was $49,167 and the median family income was $65,156. Males had a median income of $53,750 versus $28,750 for females. The per capita income for the unorganized territory was $21,474. None of the population or the families were below the poverty line.
