= Hoyt Lakes, Minnesota =

City in Minnesota, United States

Hoyt Lakes
- City
- Location of the city of Hoyt Lakes within Saint Louis County, Minnesota
- Coordinates: 47°31′17″N 92°8′14″W
- Country: United States
- State: Minnesota
- County: Saint Louis

Area
  - Total: 57.59 sq mi (149.16 km^{2})
  - Land: 55.91 sq mi (144.81 km^{2})
  - Water: 1.68 sq mi (4.34 km^{2})
- Elevation: 1,473 ft (449 m)

Population (2020)
  - Total: 2,020
  - Density: 36.1/sq mi (13.95/km^{2})
- Time zone: UTC-6 (Central (CST))
  - Summer (DST): UTC-5 (CDT)
- ZIP codes: 55750
- Area code: 218
- FIPS code: 27-30302
- GNIS feature ID: 0661511
- Website: HoytLakes.com

Hoyt Lakes is a city in Saint Louis County, Minnesota. As of the 2020 census, Hoyt Lakes had a population of 2,020.

Hoyt Lakes was created in 1955 to serve the taconite mine that were operational 1956 - 2008. Ore was transported to Taconite Harbor by the Cliffs Erie Railroad.

Saint Louis County Highway 110 (CR 110) serves as a main route in Hoyt Lakes.

== Geography ==
According to the United States Census Bureau, the city has a total area of 58.09 square miles (150.45 km^{2}); 56.44 square miles (146.18 km^{2}) is land and 1.65 square miles (4.27 km^{2}) is water. Water bodies in the community include Colby Lake and Whitewater Lake.

== Demographics ==
Historical population
Census	Pop.	Note	%±
1960	3,186		—
1970	3,634		14.1%
1980	3,186		−12.3%
1990	2,348		−26.3%
2000	2,082		−11.3%
2010	2,017		−3.1%
2020	2,020		0.1%
U.S. Decennial Census

=== 2020 census ===
As of the 2020 census, Hoyt Lakes had a population of 2,020. The median age was 45.5 years. 22.3% of residents were under the age of 18 and 25.8% of residents were 65 years of age or older. For every 100 females there were 99.2 males, and for every 100 females age 18 and over there were 99.0 males age 18 and over.

0.0% of residents lived in urban areas, while 100.0% lived in rural areas.

There were 886 households in Hoyt Lakes, of which 24.6% had children under the age of 18 living in them. Of all households, 49.0% were married-couple households, 18.4% were households with a male householder and no spouse or partner present, and 24.4% were households with a female householder and no spouse or partner present. About 30.1% of all households were made up of individuals and 16.4% had someone living alone who was 65 years of age or older.

There were 1,002 housing units, of which 11.6% were vacant. The homeowner vacancy rate was 2.2% and the rental vacancy rate was 7.3%.

Racial composition as of the 2020 census
Race	Number	Percent
White	1,898	94.0%
Black or African American	0	0.0%
American Indian and Alaska Native	10	0.5%
Asian	2	0.1%
Native Hawaiian and Other Pacific Islander	0	0.0%
Some other race	7	0.3%
Two or more races	103	5.1%
Hispanic or Latino (of any race)	30	1.5%

=== 2010 census ===
As of the census of 2010, there were 2,017 people, 885 households, and 602 families living in the city. The population density was 35.7 inhabitants per square mile (13.8/km^{2}). There were 1,016 housing units at an average density of 18.0 per square mile (6.9/km^{2}). The racial makeup of the city was 98.2% White, 0.5% Native American, and 1.3% from two or more races. Hispanic or Latino of any race were 0.3% of the population.

There were 885 households, of which 23.5% had children under the age of 18 living with them, 55.5% were married couples living together, 7.6% had a female householder with no husband present, 5.0% had a male householder with no wife present, and 32.0% were non-families. 26.8% of all households were made up of individuals, and 13.2% had someone living alone who was 65 years of age or older. The average household size was 2.27 and the average family size was 2.71.

The median age in the city was 49.3 years. 20.2% of residents were under the age of 18; 4% were between the ages of 18 and 24; 21.5% were from 25 to 44; 29.4% were from 45 to 64; and 25.1% were 65 years of age or older. The gender makeup of the city was 49.6% male and 50.4% female.

=== 2000 census ===
As of the census of 2000, there were 2,082 people, 916 households, and 649 families living in the city. The population density was 37.1 inhabitants per square mile (14.3/km^{2}). There were 995 housing units at an average density of 17.8 per square mile (6.9/km^{2}). The racial makeup of the city was 99.14% White, 0.29% African American, 0.19% Native American, 0.10% Asian, 0.05% from other races, and 0.24% from two or more races. Hispanic or Latino of any race were 0.19% of the population. 22.4% were of Norwegian, 18.6% German, 14.3% Finnish, 7.2% Irish, 6.1% Swedish and 5.2% English ancestry.

There were 916 households, out of which 24.1% had children under the age of 18 living with them, 61.6% were married couples living together, 7.3% had a female householder with no husband present, and 29.1% were non-families. 26.3% of all households were made up of individuals, and 13.3% had someone living alone who was 65 years of age or older. The average household size was 2.27 and the average family size was 2.71.

In the city, the population was spread out, with 19.8% under the age of 18, 6.6% from 18 to 24, 22.6% from 25 to 44, 29.6% from 45 to 64, and 21.3% who were 65 years of age or older. The median age was 46 years. For every 100 females, there were 99.6 males. For every 100 females age 18 and over, there were 96.4 males.

The median income for a household in the city was $39,493, and the median income for a family was $45,603. Males had a median income of $42,000 versus $24,052 for females. The per capita income for the city was $18,882. About 6.6% of families and 8.9% of the population were below the poverty line, including 19.5% of those under age 18 and 5.7% of those age 65 or over.
