= Mill Towns Trail =

Trail in Minnesota, United States

Mill Towns State Trail
- Sign for the Mill Towns Trail in Northfield
- Length: 3 mi (4.8 km)
- Location: Rice County, Minnesota, United States
- Designation: Minnesota state trail
- Trailheads: Faribault (future); Dundas; Northfield; Randolph (future); Cannon Falls (future)
- Use: Biking, hiking, in-line skating, cross-country skiing
- Difficulty: Easy
- Season: Year-round
- Sights: Cannon River, Archibald Mill, Waterford Bridge, Lake Byllesby
- Hazards: Flooding
- Surface: Asphalt, concrete
- Website: Friends of the Mill Towns Trail

The Mill Towns State Trail is a multi-use trail in development along the Cannon River in Minnesota, United States. Currently a 3-mile-long (4.8 km) rail trail linking Northfield and Dundas, the trail is planned to extend southward to Faribault and eastward to Cannon Falls.

== History ==
The rail line was surveyed in the late 1870s between Red Wing and Waterville though construction did not begin until 1882 by the Central Railway Company of Minnesota under the management of A. B. Stickney. Stickney was head of the Minnesota & Northwestern Railroad which would later become the Chicago Great Western Railway in 1891. The route from Red Wing to Waterville was completed in 1882, and the route from Waterville to Mankato, Minnesota, was completed in 1887. By 1889, the line had been renamed Wisconsin, Minnesota & Pacific and was under the trusteeship of the Rock Island railroad. The Rock Island sold the WM&P to the Chicago Great Western in the mid-1890s which operated the line until 1968 when the CGW was merged in to the Chicago & Northwestern. The C&NW operated the line for a few years after the CGW merger, but abandoned it in the early 1970s. The Union Pacific Railroad then took over the line from Faribault to Northfield, while the local Progressive Railroad took over the line from Northfield to Cannon Falls.

The trail was built as a joint effort of the cities of Northfield and Dundas in 1998. In 2000, it became a state trail.

== Extent ==
The trail is expected to close the rail trail gap between the Chicago Great Western Railway sections of Faribault and Cannon Falls. Once complete, the entire route from Mankato to Red Wing, then south to Rochester, will be complete via the Sakatah Singing Hills State Trail, the Mill Towns Trail, the Cannon Valley Regional Trail, the Goodhue Pioneer State Trail, and the Douglas State Trail.

== See also ==
- List of rail trails in Minnesota
- Cannon Valley Trail
- Sakatah Singing Hills State Trail
