= German Lake =

German Lake may refer to:

- German Lake (Isanti County, Minnesota)
- German Lake (Le Sueur County, Minnesota)
- German Lake (Otter Tail County, Minnesota)

== See also ==
- List of lakes of Germany
