= Edward T. Archibald House =

Historic house in Minnesota, United States

- U.S. National Register of Historic Places
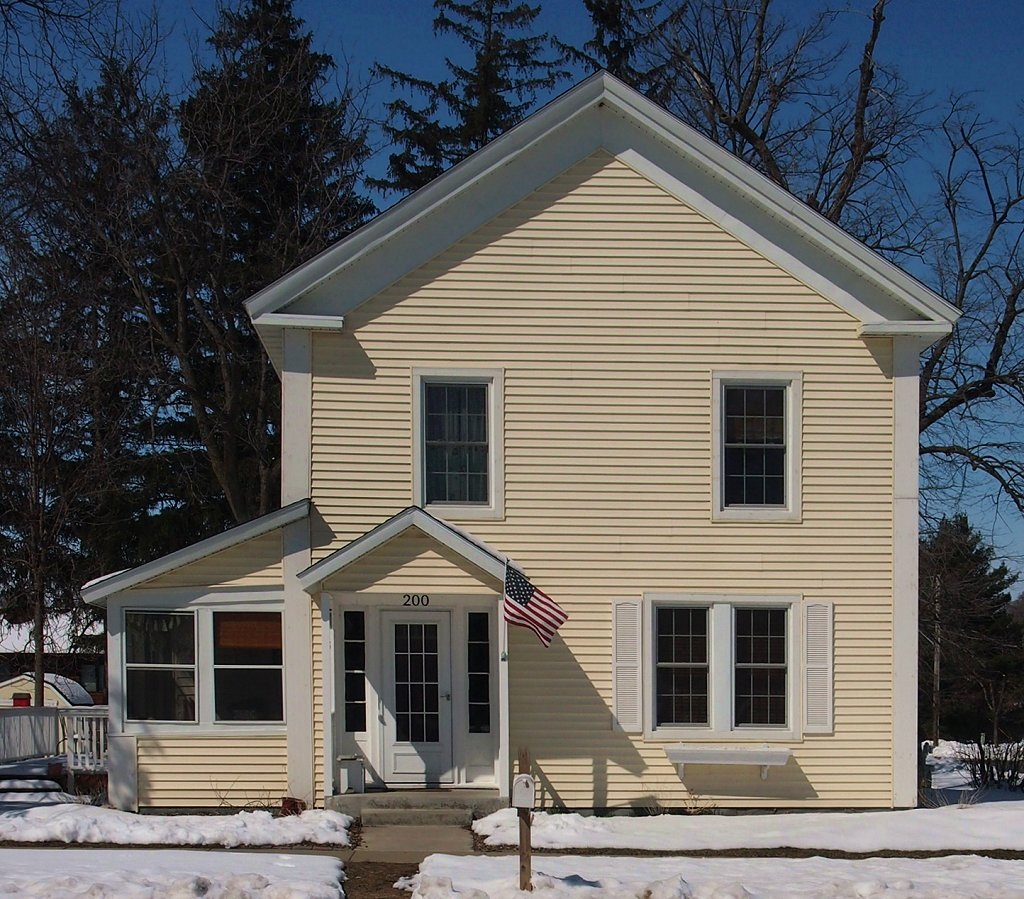
- The Edward T. Archibald House from the southeast

- Location within Minnesota Location within the United States
- Location: 200 2nd Street South, Dundas, Minnesota
- Coordinates: 44°25′34″N 93°12′15″W
- Area: less than one acre
- Architect: Hamblin, Lorenzo
- Architectural style: Greek Revival
- NRHP reference No.: 76001072
- Added to NRHP: June 17, 1976

The Edward T. Archibald House is a historic farmhouse in Dundas, Minnesota, United States. The private home was placed on the National Register of Historic Places (NRHP) on June 17, 1976. Built in the 1860s, the farmhouse is significant for its association with the prominent miller Edward T. Archibald, whose nearby Archibald Mill was an important mill in the history of Minnesota's flour milling industry.

== Structure ==
The Edward T. Archibald House is located on the southwest corner of 2nd Street and Hamilton Street in Dundas. The structure is a two-story wood frame structure built in a simple clapboard-sided Greek Revival architecture with a gable roof. It originally had a service wing, but only the main portion of the house remains. The property also once included a wood frame stable carriage barn, but it was later demolished and replaced by neighboring homes.

== History and significance ==
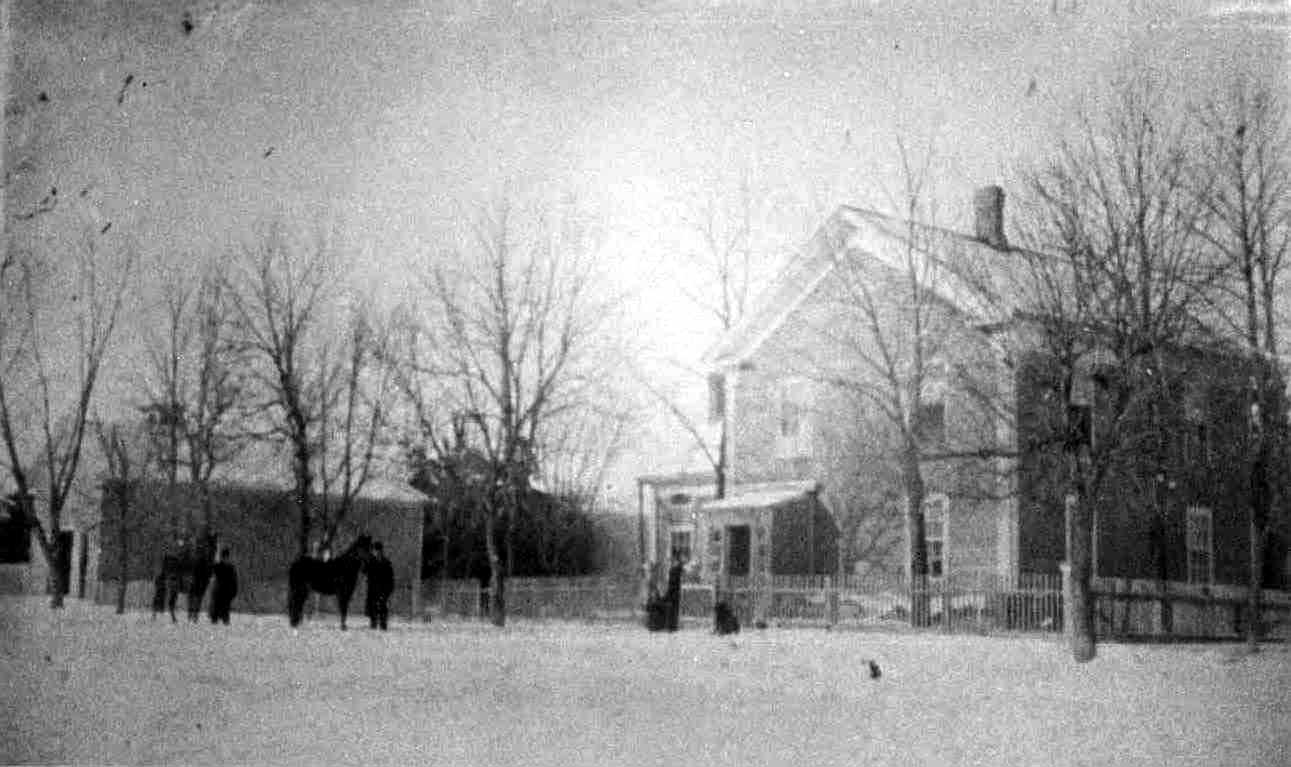
Edward T. Archibald House, c. 1870. Note the original barn on the left, as well as the service wing on the left side of the house.

The house was originally built by Lorenzo Hamblin in the 1860s. Edward T. Archibald purchased the property and lived there from 1867 until 1885. Archibald's work in milling garnered him attention in trade publications of his time as "The man or firm who takes the leading place among flour makers of this country or of the world."

Though there were settlers before them, brothers John Sidney and Edward T., along with their cousin George Archibald were responsible for founding Dundas in 1867; they named it after their hometown of Dundas, Ontario, Canada. They built mills on both sides of the Cannon River.

Due to the great care that was taken in its manufacture, flour from the Archibald Mill was recognized as the best in the United States. "Dundas straight", as it became known, was sold for $1.00 or more per barrel in New York City and Boston markets than the flours produced in Minneapolis. As a result, Minneapolis millers would come down to Dundas to study the Archibald Mill.

A progressive miller, John Sidney imported three barrels of Red Fife wheat from Canada; the Archibalds developed the seed into the No. 1 hard spring wheat that revolutionized farming in Minnesota. Before 1860, the wheat grown in the United States was soft winter wheat, but spring wheat was better suited to the soil. What initially prevented spring wheat from wide adoption was its characteristic flinty quality and high middlings content. Under the low grinding process used before 1870, the wheat's hardness caused the mash to heat and its thin brittle bran filled the flour with specks that discolored the flour. To fix this issue, millstones in their mills were run at a lower speed and were set higher so as to simply crack the kernel at the first grinding. It was then put through several grindings. The purpose was to make middlings the most valuable part of the product, as gluten was found in the middlings and provided nutrition and gave bread its rising quality. The Archibalds' mills would later be among the first to adopt the middlings purifier, developed in Minneapolis, which allowed for large scale production of the higher gluten flour.

Recognizing the need to rise to the competition of Minneapolis mills, Edward T. Archibald made further improvements. In 1879, he remodeled the mills to use rollers, also known as the "Hungarian milling process", which increased productivity while maintaining quality. The Archibald Mill was among the first to use the roller system in its entirety. At this time the mills were at their peak in notability and importance in the flour milling world.

Edward T. Archibald moved to nearby Northfield in 1885. The mill complex burned down on New Year's Eve in 1892 and was immediately rebuilt. It burned down again in 1914, was rebuilt and sold as the industry began to decline. The patents involved were sold to what is now General Mills.
