= Dakota Boom =

Rapid development in the Dakota Territory (1878–1887)

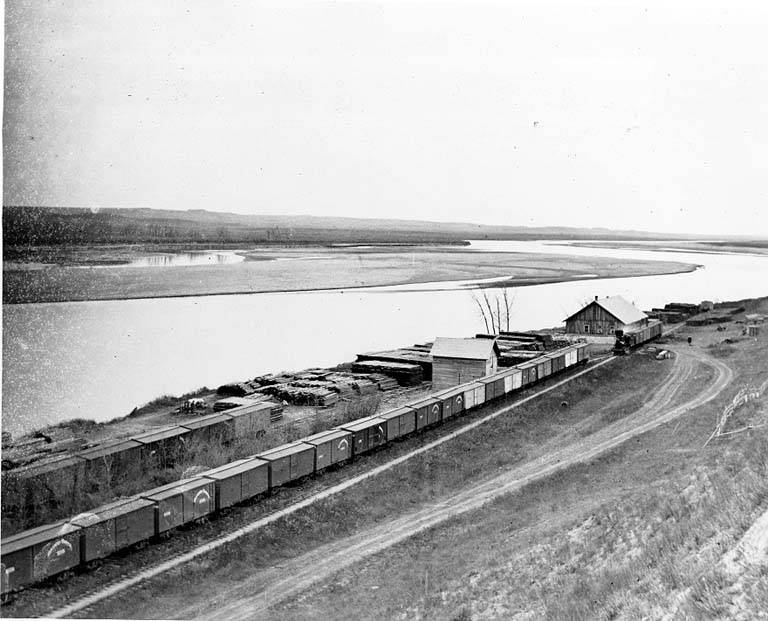
- The Northern Pacific Railway in Bismarck, Dakota Territory, 1879
- Date: 1878-1887
- Location: Dakota Territory (present-day North Dakota and South Dakota)

The Dakota Boom was a period of rapid settlement, population growth, and agricultural development in the Dakota Territory from 1878 to 1887, establishing the region as a major farming hub. Fueled by the 1862 Homestead Act, the extension of railroads into the Dakota Territory, the growth of the flour milling industry in Minneapolis, and favorable environmental conditions, the boom increased the territory’s population from 11,766 in 1870 to over 328,000 by 1890. In that time, the number farms growing from 1,700 to more than 50,000 and towns increasing from six to 310; by the late 1880s the Dakota Territory was trailed only by Minnesota in American wheat production. The rapid population growth and development brought about by the Dakota Boom paved the way for North Dakota and South Dakota’s statehood in 1889.

== Background ==
The Dakota Territory, organized in 1861, was home to Sioux tribes, including the Sisseton, Yankton, and Santee, who sustained themselves through fishing, hunting, and trade along rivers like the Missouri River. French traders explored the region in the 17th century, followed by American expeditions, such as Lewis and Clark’s in 1804-06. The 1851 Treaty of Mendota with the Santee Sioux and the 1858 treaty with the Yankton Sioux ceded millions of acres to the United States, opening large parts of the Dakota Territory to American settlement. Early settlement was hindered by severe winters, grasshopper plagues, and conflict with the Sioux, notably in the Great Sioux War of 1876.

The pre-boom economy of the Dakota Territory consisted primarily of fur trading and military outposts, such as Fort Randall. The 1862 Homestead Acts, offering 160 acres of free land to settlers able to farm the land for five years, encouraged migration to the Dakota Territory. Uptake in the Dakota Territory was slow until the mid-1870s, by which point most farmland comparable in quality to that of the Dakota Territory in states further to the east had already been claimed^{:148}. Homesteading ultimately resulted in 6,054,097 acres claimed in South Dakota by 1910 and 14,287 claims filed in North Dakota by 1908. Territorial governments and railroads aggressively promoted the region, distributing pamphlets that touted its fertile prairies and abundant harvests, drawing thousands of settlers. In addition to agricultural development, the Black Hills Gold Rush (1874-1879) drew prospectors to western Dakota, generating wealth and demand for agricultural products from the eastern portion of the territory, and spurring further development of the territory's transportation infrastructure, including railroads, stagecoach routes and ports on the Missouri River. Steamboats supported river ports like Yankton and Bismarck, while stagecoaches linked railheads to remote settlements, complementing the rail network and enabling rapid settlement across the territory’s fertile plains.

Railroads were key to unleashing rapid settlement of the Dakota Territory, with the Northern Pacific Railway reaching Fargo in 1872 and the Missouri River at Bismarck by 1873, extending to Dickinson by 1880 and Glendive, Montana, by 1881. The Chicago and North Western Railway connected Pierre, Huron, and Brookings by 1879-1880, while the Chicago, Milwaukee, St. Paul and Pacific Railroad reached Mitchell and Chamberlain by 1880-1881. These railroads sold federal land grants, recruited and transported settlers, and shipped crops, fueling the land rush.

Improvements in transportation were complemented by favorable economic and environmental conditions for farming: increased rainfall in the late 1870s, abundant ground- and surface water due to the heavy snowfall of the "hard winter" of 1880-1881 and the decline of locust swarms improved crop yields, while the development of steel plows and mechanized harvesters facilitated cultivation of the tough prairie sod.^{:146} The invention of the Middlings purifier and construction of numerous mills incorporating it in Minneapolis suddenly converted spring wheat, the cultivation of which the Dakota Territory was well-suited to, from an inferior product into a valuable commodity.

== Migration and settlement ==
From 1878 to 1887, an unprecedented influx settlers transformed the Dakota Territory, reshaping its demographics and landscape and increasing the population from 11,766 in 1870 to over 328,000 by 1890. In addition to Yankees from the eastern United States, settlers included Norwegians, Germans (including many Germans from Russia), Scandinavians, Irish, and Scots, with over 79% of North Dakotans by 1915 being recent European immigrants or their descendants. Organized colonies, often comprising up to 100 families, settled together, preserving cultural practices, as seen in German-Russian communities near Bismarck and Norwegian enclaves around Fargo.

During the decade ending June 30,1889, nearly forty-two million acres, or half the area of the Dakota territory, was claimed by settlers. By contrast, during the five years after the Dakota Territory's organization in 1862, only 100,000 acres were filed on. On August 1, 1870, still less than 500,000 acres had been claimed. Nearly two-fifths of the entire acreage filed on in the United States in the year ending June 30, 1883, however, was located in Dakota.

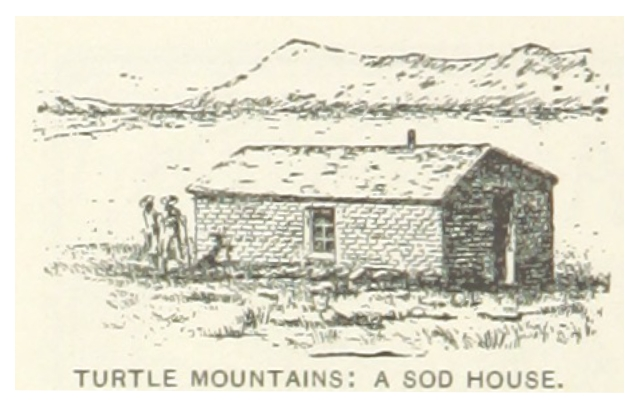
Illustration of a sod house in the Turtle Mountains, North Dakota, 1891

Land Claimed in Dakota (Acres), July 1, 1874, to June 30, 1889^{:151}
Year	Acres
1874	206,000
1875	392,000
1877	213,000
1878	1,378,000
1879	1,657,000
1880	2,269,000
1881	2,673,000
1882	4,360,000
1883	7,317,000
1884	11,083,000
1885	4,548,000
1886	3,075,000
1887	2,076,000
1888	1,881,000

Settlement closely followed railroad routes, which caused the rise of commercial hubs like Fargo, Bismarck, Sioux Falls, Yankton, and Aberdeen. The Northern Pacific Railway, Chicago and North Western Railway, and Chicago, Milwaukee, St. Paul and Pacific Railroad transported settlers and supplies, enabling towns to evolve from rough railroad camps and claim shanties into organized communities with stores, schools, and courthouses. Many settlers initially lived in sod houses or dugouts due to scarce timber, adapting to the prairie environment while establishing farms. Railroads also facilitated land speculation, with companies selling federal grants to finance further expansion, accelerating settlement across the territory’s fertile plains. Railroads also recruited new settlers to the territory by publishing pamphlets extolling its virtues, containing suggestions of value.

For the settlers, community life thrived despite challenges, with newspapers fostering local identity and women contributing as homesteaders and educators. Social gatherings, such as church events and harvest festivals, strengthened bonds among newly-arrived settlers.

Lingering tensions from the Great Sioux War of 1876 and subsequent policies, such as the 1877 Black Hills cession, further eroded Sioux autonomy and sometimes erupted in small-scale military conflict during this period.

== Economy and infrastructure ==
Agriculture was the Dakota Boom’s economic engine, with wheat emerging as the primary crop, positioning Minneapolis as a milling hub by the 1880s. Homesteaders and large-scale “bonanza farms,” mechanized operations spanning thousands of acres, cultivated vast wheat fields, particularly in North Dakota. Railroads connected these farms to markets in the eastern United States and abroad, with lines like the Northern Pacific enabling exports. By 1881, towns across the Dakota Territory boasted mills, banks, and newspapers.

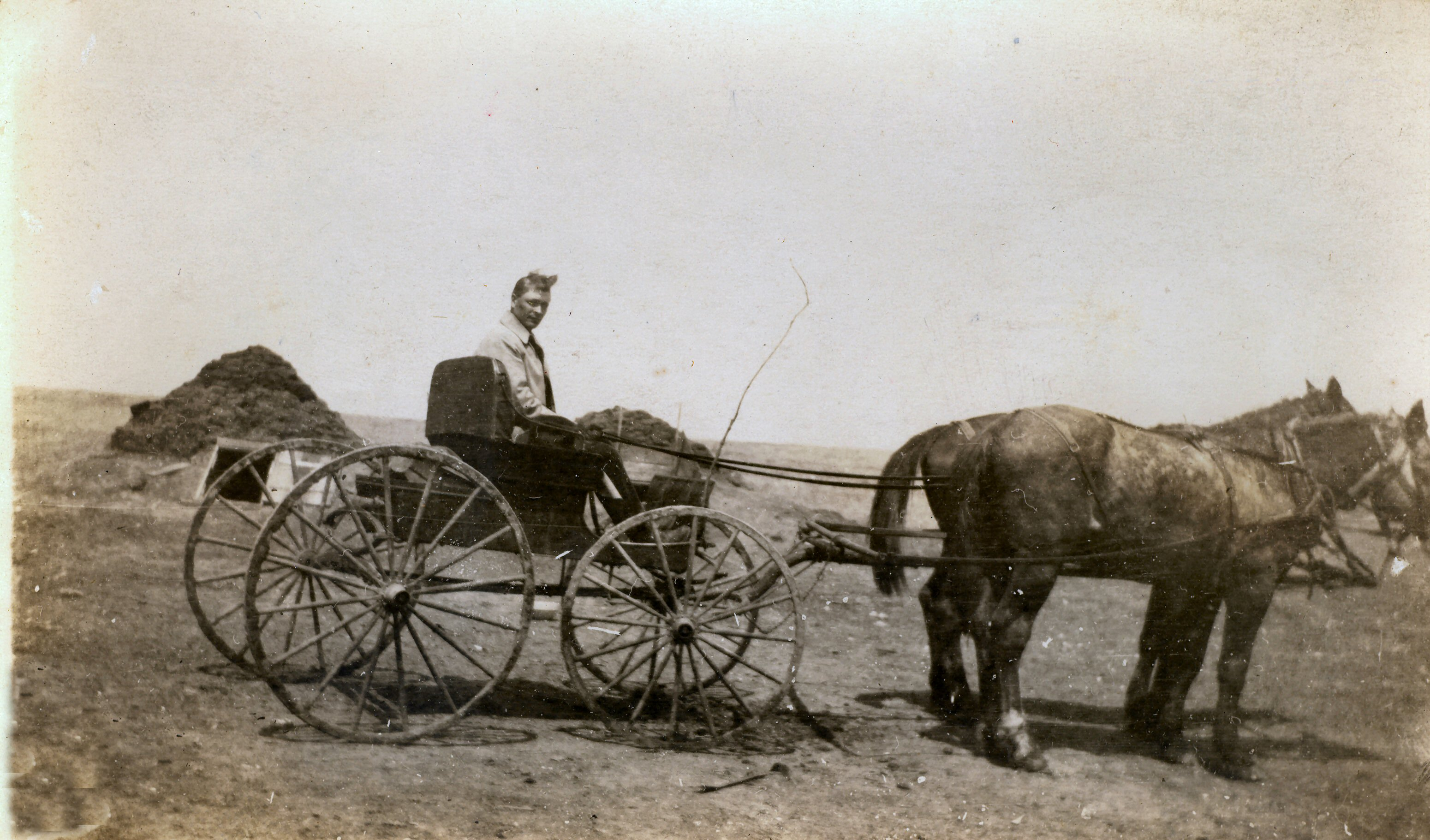
Homesteader in Marmarth, North Dakota. Homesteader agriculture was the Dakota Boom's economic engine.

Urban development accompanied agricultural expansion. Sioux Falls, for example, grew into a bustling town by 1880, with businesses and infrastructure driven by the influx of settlers. Rapid population growth strained resources, leading to makeshift housing like sod houses and dugouts. Investments in schools and churches, such as normal schools for teacher training, supported community development. The Dakota Territory's heavy reliance on wheat in the aftermath of the Dakota Boom contributed, however, to economic volatility and vulnerability to declines in wheat prices.

== Legacy ==
The Dakota Boom was past its peak by 1887 as a result of drought, declining wheat prices, and overextended credit, which strained homesteaders and bonanza farms. The closure of military posts like Fort Randall in the early 1890s on account of the reduced need for military outposts in a now-settled region with extensive transportation links to other parts of the United States signaled the frontier’s end. The 1890 census declared the frontier closed, completing the Dakotas’ shift to a settled region.

North and South Dakota gained statehood in 1889, enabled by the boom’s population and infrastructure. The agricultural systems established, including railroads and farming communities, remain vital to the region’s economy. However, the displacement of Native Americans to reservations left lasting social impacts, and the environmental toll of monoculture farming, including soil erosion, persists.

The Dakota Boom’s cultural impact endures through literature and historical preservation. Laura Ingalls Wilder’s Little House series, set in the Dakota Territory, vividly captures settler life, with books like The Long Winter describing the harsh winter of 1880-81. Adapted into television and theater, the series remains a cultural touchstone. Settler traditions, such as Norwegian and German festivals, continue to shape the culture of North and South Dakota.

== See also ==
- Homestead Act
- Northern Pacific Railway
- Black Hills Gold Rush
- Little House on the Prairie
