= Ault Store =

- U.S. National Register of Historic Places
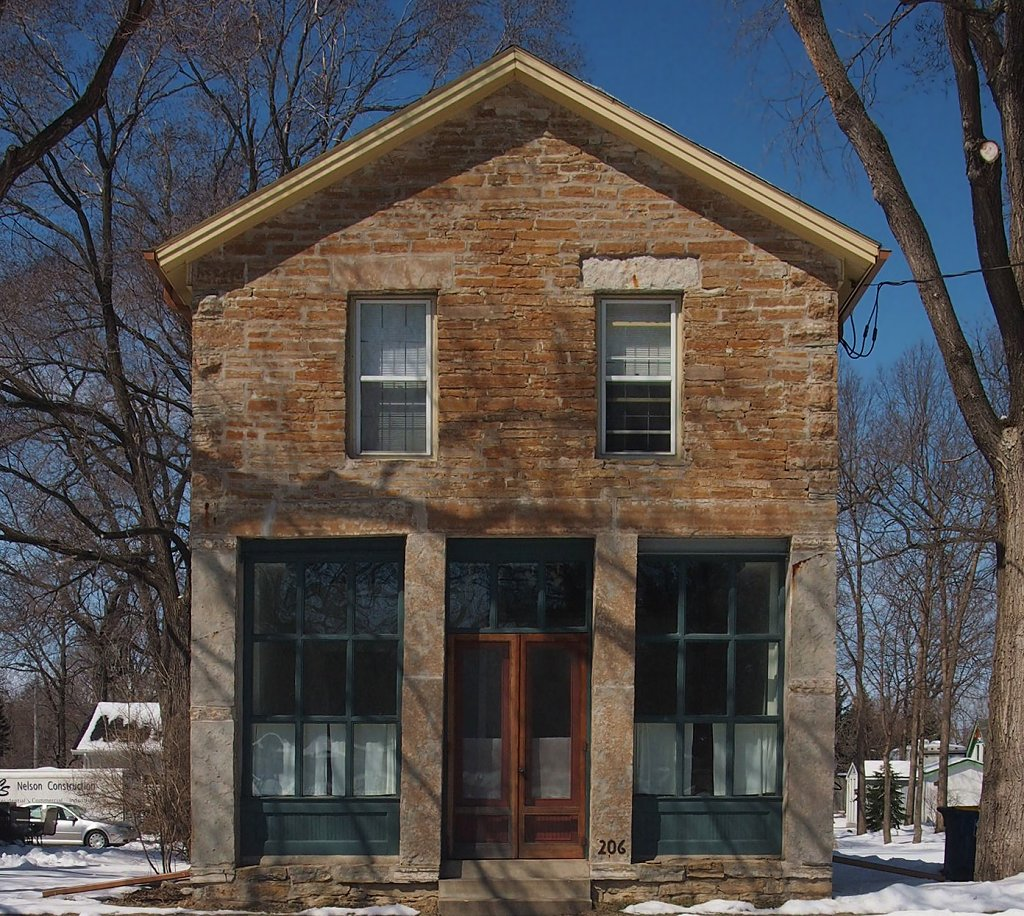
- The Ault Store from the southeast

- Location within Minnesota Location within the United States
- Location: 206 2nd St., Dundas, Minnesota
- Coordinates: 44°25′43″N 93°12′10″W
- Area: less than one acre
- Built: 1866
- MPS: Rice County MRA
- NRHP reference No.: 82003004
- Added to NRHP: April 06, 1982

The Ault Store is a historic commercial building in Dundas, Minnesota, United States. The building was placed on the National Register of Historic Places (NRHP) on April 6, 1982.

== Structure ==
The Ault Store is located in what was Dundas' original business district, on Second Street on the east side of the Cannon River. The neighborhood is now residential. A two-story stone structure, it was constructed in 1866 of locally quarried limestone. The building is rectangular, with a low gable roof, with the gable end oriented towards the street. The front facade, facing east, has three large rectilinear opening on its first floor; the three sections are divided by heavy vertical stone members. A double transomed door occupies the center bay and is flanked by large nine-paned storefront windows. On the second story, large cut stones at the corners of the building give the suggestion of corner quoins. The fenestration of the upper level of the front facade consists of two double hung sash windows with six over six lights and heavy stone lintels. The windows on the north and south facades consist of windows on the second floor and doorways in the rear bay.

== History ==
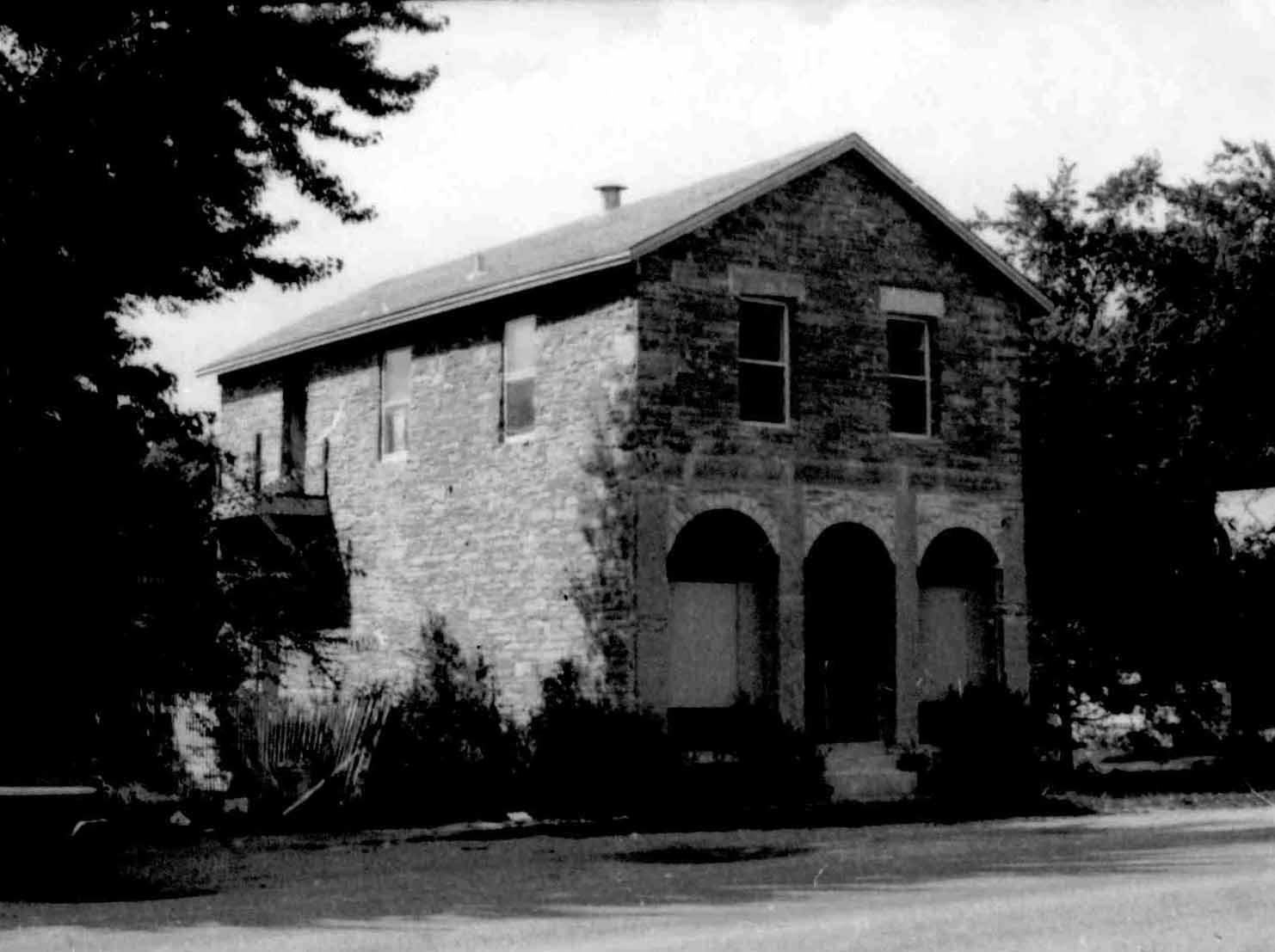
The structure's storefront windows had non-structural, decorative arches added to them, however they were removed in later restoration. The building was abandoned for a number of years before being transformed into a residential structure.

Edgar Ault, who had worked as a local merchant since 1859, built the store in 1866. Ault's store occupied the first floor and carried a full line of furniture, pharmaceuticals and necessities. The front room of the second floor housed the community's first library and the back room was used for office space. The local newspaper, the Dundas News, operated out of the rear office from its founding in 1876 to its sale and incorporation into the nearby Northfield News in 1879. At the height of Dundas' original commercial district, the area also included another general store, hotel, shoe store, restaurant, meeting hall and saloon. The neighborhood began to shift once the Minnesota Central Railway built its station on the west side of the river, resulting in the development of Railway Street and the platting of the Railway Addition in 1865. The commercial focus of the city shifted to near the railroad. Ault joined the move across the river in 1882, moving his store to larger quarters on Railway Street.

Subsequent owners of the building added arched tops to the storefront windows, however later restorations removed them. The building was vacant for a number of years, before being purchased and restored for residential use in the 1970s and 80s. The Ault Store is now a multifunctional building, serving as an artist studio and residence.

== Significance ==
The Ault Store was listed on the National Register for its local significance in commerce and settlement. It is the last remaining commercial building of what was Dundas' original business district, and is a significant example of the first generation of commercial buildings constructed in Rice County during the 1850s and '60s. The scale and simplicity of the design and use of locally available materials mark the building as characteristic of the generation of commercial buildings constructed by residents.

== See also ==
- National Register of Historic Places in Rice County, Minnesota
