= Welch, Minnesota =

Unincorporated community in Minnesota, United States

Welch
- Unincorporated community
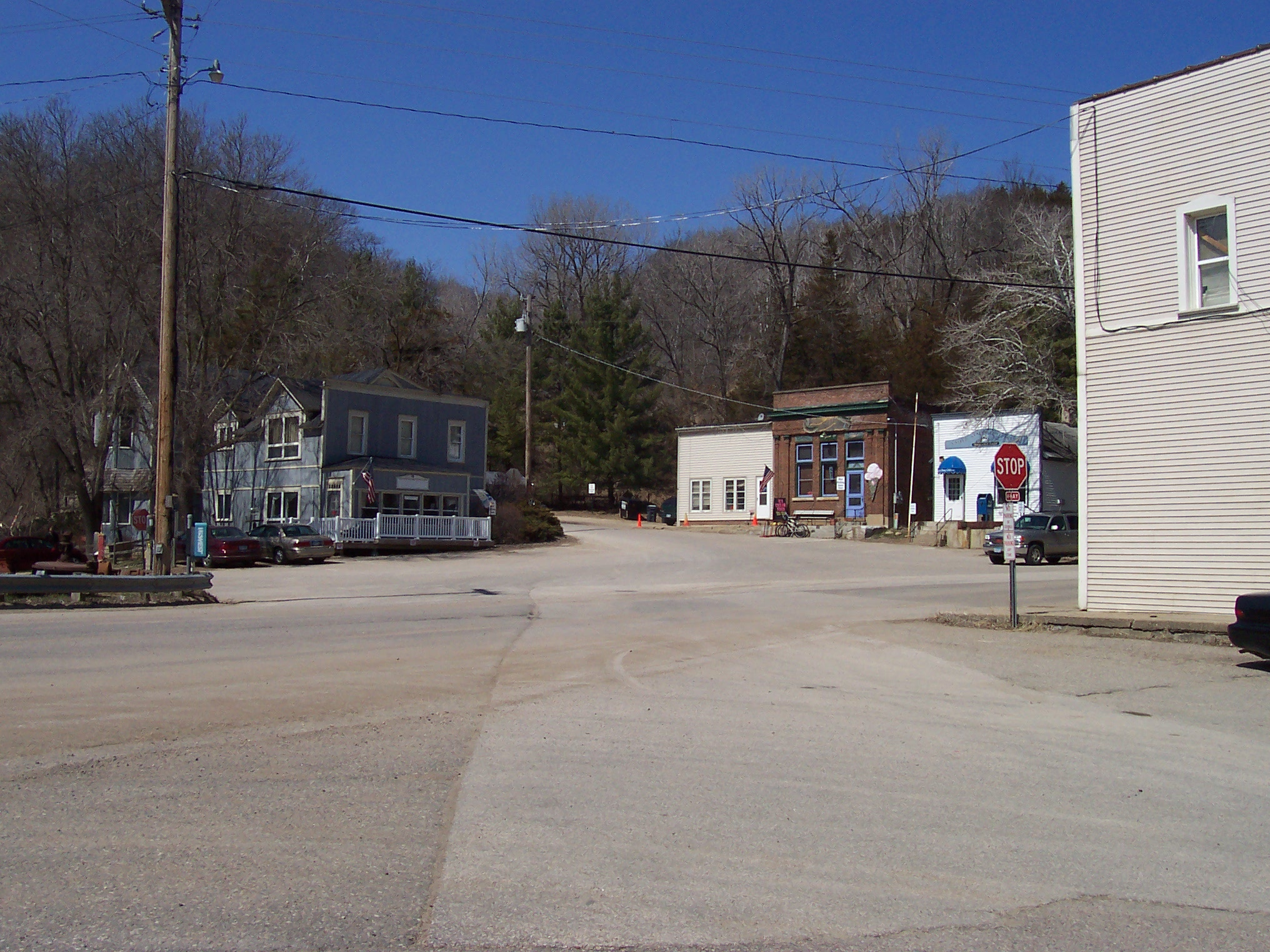
- Central Welch

- Location within Minnesota Location within the United States
- Coordinates: 44°34′06″N 92°44′19″W
- Country: United States
- State: Minnesota
- County: Goodhue
- Township: Welch
- Elevation: 722 ft (220 m)
- Time zone: UTC-6 (Central (CST))
  - Summer (DST): UTC-5 (CDT)
- ZIP code: 55089
- Area code: 651
- GNIS feature ID: 653897

Welch is an unincorporated community in Welch Township, Goodhue County, Minnesota, United States.

Welch is along County 7 Boulevard near Highway 61, 36 miles southeast of St. Paul. The Cannon River flows through the community. The Canyon Valley Trail (CVT), which runs from Cannon Falls to Red Wing, goes through the village.

Welch is within ZIP code 55089. Welch Village ski area is nearby.
