= Archibald Mill =

- U.S. National Register of Historic Places
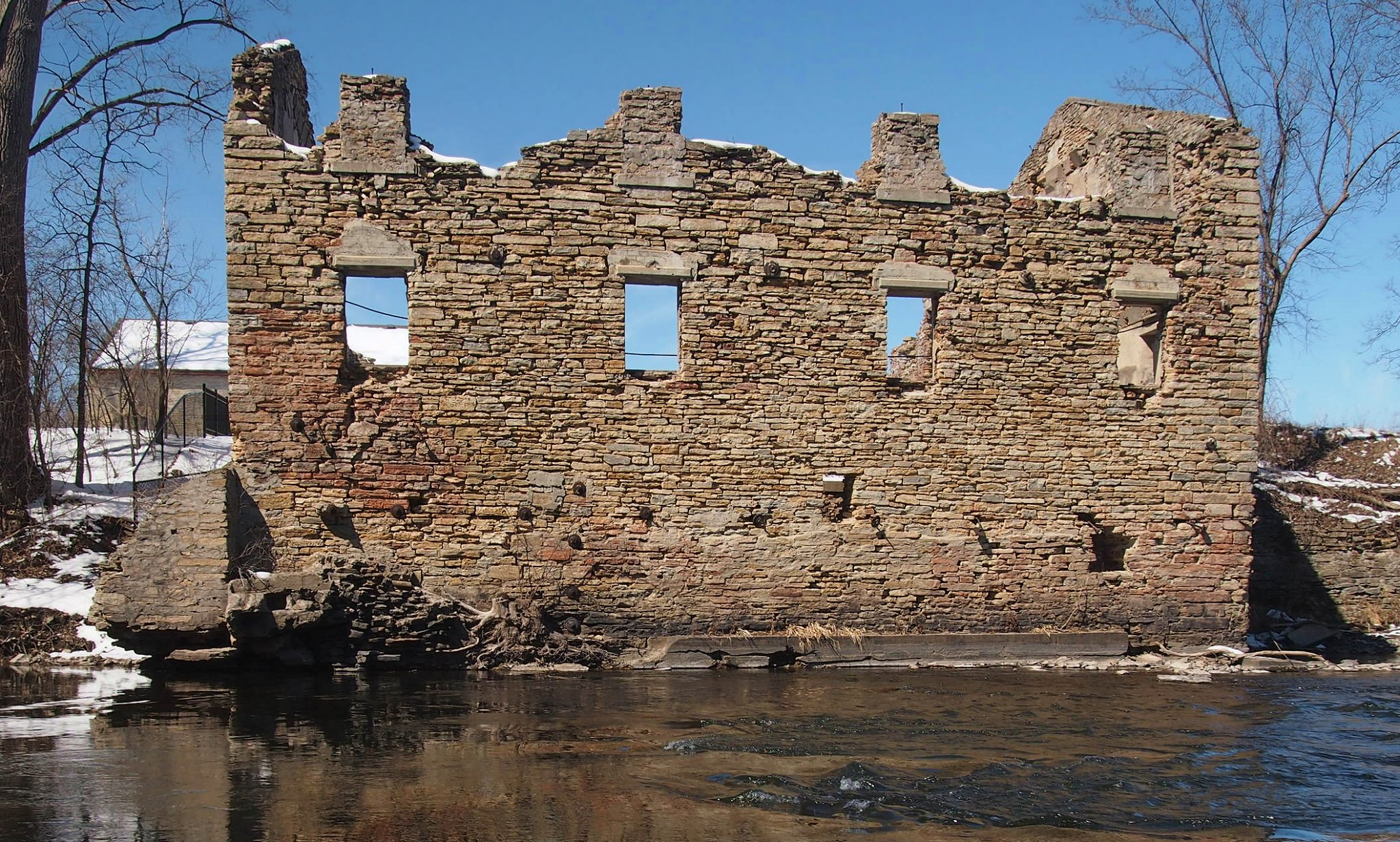
- Ruins of the 1870 Archibald Mill from the southeast

- Location within Minnesota Location within the United States
- Location: Railway Street; Dundas, Minnesota
- Coordinates: 44°25′47″N 93°12′23″W
- Area: 9.64 acres (3.90 ha)
- NRHP reference No.: 76001071
- Added to NRHP: October 8, 1976

The Archibald Mill was a water-powered gristmill complex, now reduced to ruins, on the Cannon River in Dundas, Minnesota, United States. The mill was founded in 1857 and expanded with a second mill across the river in 1870. It was the first U.S. mill to produce and market patent flour, and its "Dundas Straight" was once considered the best flour in the country. The Archibald Mill is associated with the introduction of hard spring wheat to Minnesota, and was one of the nation's first outfits to convert fully into a roller mill. The site is listed on the National Register of Historic Places for its national significance in commerce, industry, and flour milling.

Today only the foundation of the 1857 mill remains, while the ruins of the 1870 mill stand on the river's edge near a trailhead for the Mill Towns Trail.

== History ==
The first mill in Dundas was built by cousins John Sidney (J.S.) Archibald and George Archibald on the east bank of the Cannon River in late 1857. John's brother Edward was also involved. The family had moved from another town named Dundas in Ontario, Canada.

At the time, the Cannon River had only one channel in Dundas and an 1860 flood caused a split, routing water further east of the mill and creating an island, which still exists today. Across the river was a sawmill, built in 1856 and purchased by the Archibalds for use in constructing their mill. Wooden dams on both channels controlled water flow.

The mill used the most current technology available and produced flour of a fine quality. Called EXTRA, the flour was sold for $1 or $2 more per barrel than other local flours.

A second mill was built in 1870 on the west bank of the west channel. In 1879 the original mill was completely remodeled. A Hungarian roller system was added and it produced better quality flour at an increased rate.

On December 31, 1892, both mills caught fire and burned. The Archibalds sold the site to the owners of the local grain elevator, who rebuilt the mills. A rebuilt mill burned on November 19, 1914. The monetary loss of the fire was $30,000, partially covered by insurance. After the 1914 fire, the Archibald Mill was rebuilt for the final time and later partially destroyed in the early 1930s.

== See also ==
- National Register of Historic Places listings in Rice County, Minnesota
- Edward T. Archibald House
