= Lake Jefferson (Minnesota) =

Lake in the state of Minnesota, United States

- Location within Minnesota Location within the United States
- Location: Le Sueur County, Minnesota
- Coordinates: 44.2741336°N 93.7816200°W
- Basin countries: United States
- Surface area: 1,141 acres (4.62 km^{2})
- Max. depth: 37 ft (11 m)
- Surface elevation: 1,017 ft (310 m)
- Islands: 6
- Settlements: 0

Lake Jefferson is a lake in Le Sueur County, Minnesota. The lake covers an area of 1,141 acres (4.62 km^{2}) and is 37 feet (11 m) deep at its deepest point. Fish species enzootic to Lake Jefferson include bluegill, largemouth bass, northern pike, and walleye. While the Geographic Names Information System considers Lake Jefferson to be a single lake, it is sometimes referred to as two lakes, East Jefferson Lake and West Jefferson Lake. There are four sections: lower Jefferson, middle Jefferson, upper Jefferson, and Swedes Bay. The lake drains to German Lake through a connecting culvert, and is part of the Cannon River watershed.

The lake was named for Thomas Jefferson, the third President of the United States.
