= Cannon Valley Trail =

Paved rail trail in Minnesota

Coordinates: 44°32′38″N 92°47′8″W

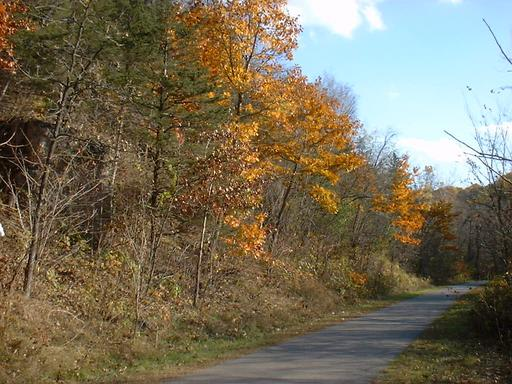
- Fall colors along the Cannon Valley Trail
- Length: 19.7 mi (31.7 km)
- Location: follows the Cannon River in southeast Minnesota
- Designation: Minnesota state trail
- Trailheads: Cannon Falls, Red Wing
- Use: hiking, cycling, in-line skating, skiing
- Surface: paved

The Cannon Valley Trail is a paved rail trail that follows the Cannon River in southeast Minnesota. The trail follows an abandoned Chicago Great Western Railway corridor for 20 miles (32 km) between Cannon Falls, Minnesota and Red Wing, Minnesota. In the spring, summer, and fall months, the trail is open to hiking, biking, and inline skating. In the winter months, the trail is groomed for cross-country skiing.

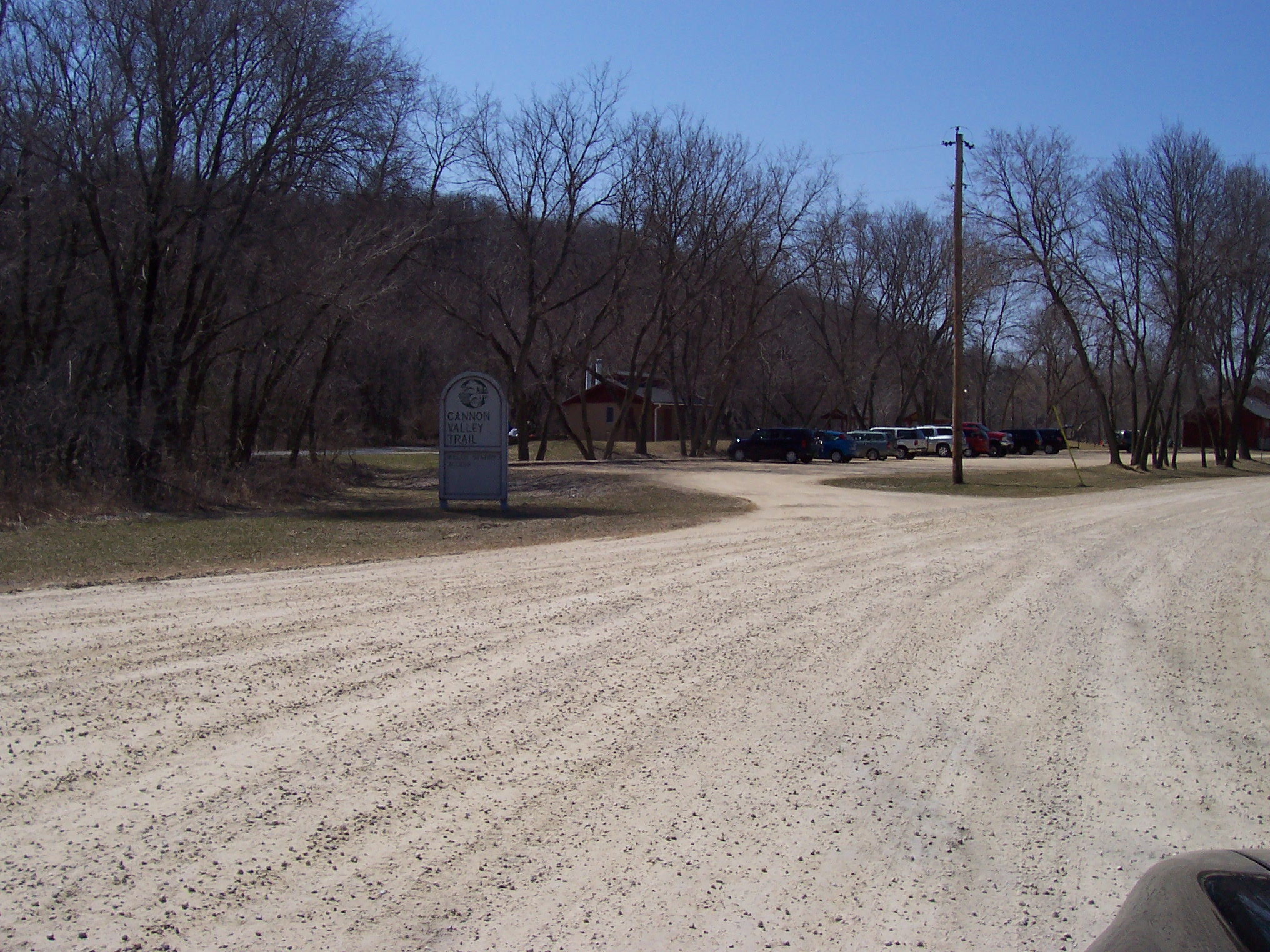
Trailhead at Welch

Points of interest on the trail include the Cannon River, wildlife management areas, a 1.5-mile (2.4 km) mountain-bike trail, Welch Village ski area, and the Red Wing archaeological preserve. The trail is managed by a joint powers board consisting of representatives from Cannon Falls, Red Wing and Goodhue County, Minnesota.

== History ==
The railroad of Alpheus Beede Stickney, the Minnesota Central Railroad Company (MCRR), built the Cannon Valley railroad out from Red Wing through Northfield to Faribault in 1882, pushing on to Mankato. There was a railroad war with the Milwaukee Road building a parallel branch line from Northfield to Red Wing. The MCRR was bought out by the Chicago, Rock Island and Pacific Railroad who in 1899 sold the trackage to Stickney's new company, the Minnesota and Northwestern Railroad, that by this time had become the Chicago Great Western Railway (a railroad better known by its slight name change nine years later when Stickney had left: the Chicago Great Western Railroad).

Local private citizens purchased the railroad roadbed for a recreational trail in 1983 following the C&NWs (the successor to the CGW) decision to abandon the line.

The Cannon Valley Trail contains milepost markers installed by CGW, which indicate the distance from Mankato — the railroad's original western terminus.

== Related Trails ==
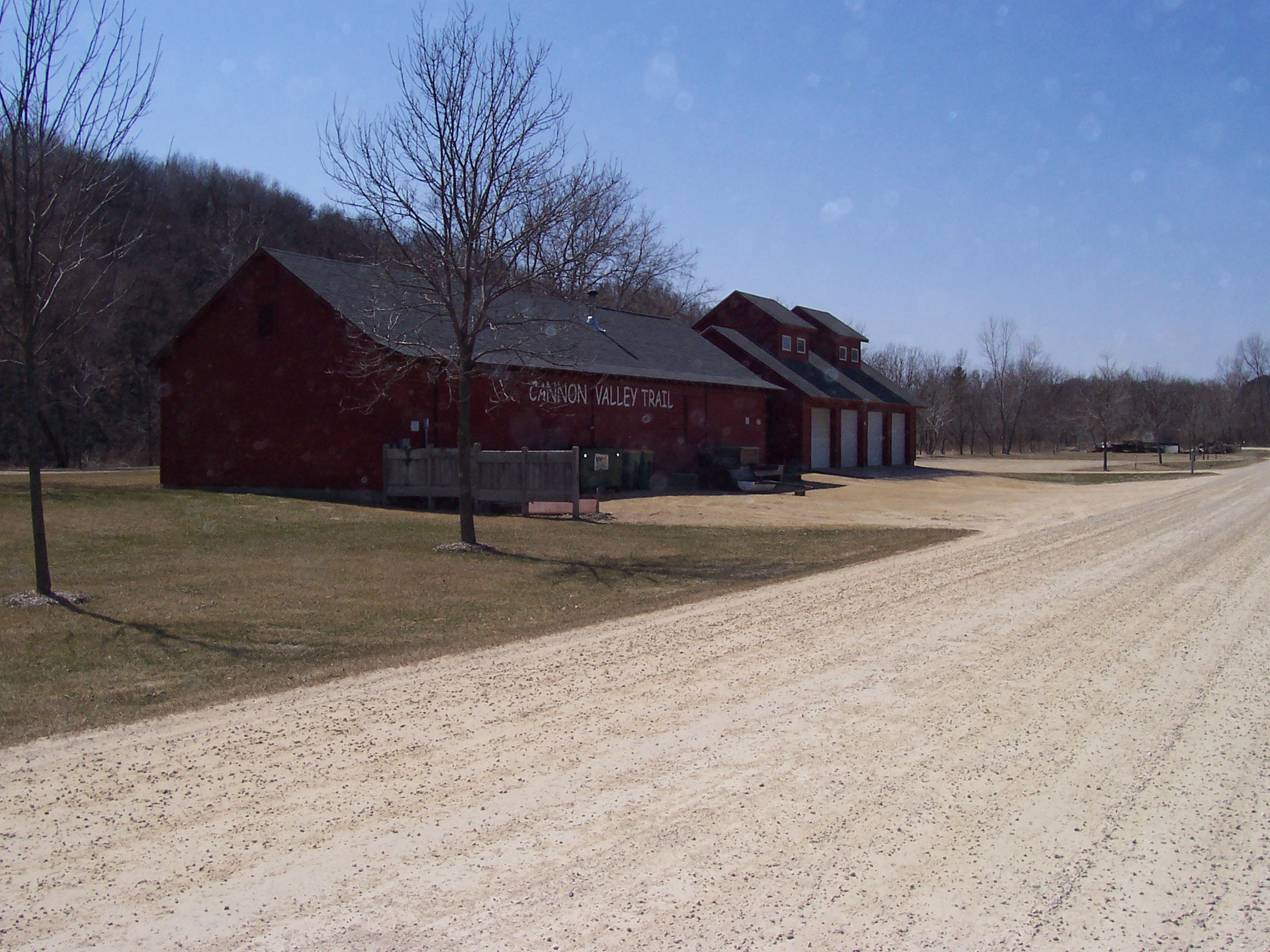
Maintenance building at Welch

=== Sakatah Singing Hills State Trail ===
The section of the Chicago Great Western from Faribault to Mankato is now the Sakatah Singing Hills State Trail.

=== Cannon Falls to Faribault ===
The section of the Chicago Great Western between Faribault and Cannon Falls is being developed by the Mill Towns Trail Association which would result in the former route of the entire Chicago Great Western (originally the Central Railway Company of Minnesota and later the Wisconsin, Minnesota & Pacific) from Mankato to Red Wing being converted to trail use.

=== Goodhue Pioneer State Trail ===
In Red Wing, the trail connects to the Goodhue Pioneer State Trail.
