= Jeanne L'Strange Cappel =

American writer

- Jeanne S. Cappel, from a 1926 newspaper
- Born: Jeanne Marie Strange; May 10, 1873; Dundas, Minnesota
- Died: September 27, 1949; Los Angeles, California
- Other names: Wa-be-no O-pee-chee, Wabena Opechee, Jennie Strange Rolson
- Occupation(s): Writer, teacher, playground director, clubwoman
- Notable work: Chippewa Tales (1930)

Jeanne L'Strange Cappel (May 10, 1873 – September 27, 1949), also known as Jennie Strange Rolson, Wa-be-no O-pee-chee, and Wabena Opechee, was an American writer, educator, and clubwoman, author of Chippewa Tales (1928).

== Early life ==
Jeanne Marie Strange was born in Dundas, Minnesota, the daughter of Edward Strange (1842–1908) and Laura (or Lauraette) Sargent Strange (1846–1937). She was described as being a member of the Chippewa (Ojibwe) people, and recalled a Chippewa grandmother in her presentations. She graduated from the University of Southern California.

== Career ==
Cappel was a physical education teacher and playground director in Los Angeles. She wrote two volumes of Chippewa Tales (1928, 1930), retellings of traditional stories, and The Mother You Gave Me (1941), a novel, with Beatrice Phillips Cole. She was a founding member and president of the American Indian Woman's History and Art Club, and wrote, directed, and acted in a play, Out of the Past, performed by the club in 1933. The club required active members to have Indian ancestry.

Cappel gave lectures on American Indian lore to community groups and at a Campfire Girls camp, sometimes in costume, and sometimes with her son to accompany her. "The Indian tales deal so much with things in nature," she explained of her work. "They not only give a practical suggestion that is real education for the child mind, but they also afford the imagination a delightful impetus."

Cappel was also active with the Dickens Fellowship, and the Los Angeles branch of the National League of American Pen Women. She was reported to be "the first woman of her ancestry to become a Daughter of the American Revolution".

== Personal life ==
Jennie Strange married Richard O. Rolson in 1891; they had a son, Robert Earl Rolson (1893–1986), and moved to California, where they divorced. She married Albert Cappel in 1916, in Los Angeles. He died in 1937. She lived in Laguna Beach in her later years, and died in 1949, aged 76 years, in Los Angeles. Her gravesite is in Inglewood Park Cemetery.
