= Sakatah Lake State Park =

State park in Minnesota

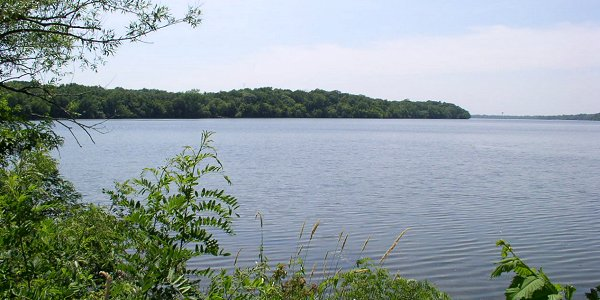
- Sakatah Lake State Park as seen from the east shore of Sakatah Lake

- Location within Minnesota Location within the United States
- Location: Minnesota, United States
- Coordinates: 44°13′15″N 93°32′8″W
- Area: 842 acres (341 ha)
- Elevation: 1,076 ft (328 m)
- Established: 1963
- Governing body: Minnesota Department of Natural Resources

Sakatah Lake State Park is an 842-acre (341 ha) state park of Minnesota, USA, on a natural widening of the Cannon River near the town of Waterville. The Dakota native to the area called it "Sakatah" which means "singing hills". To honor this native heritage, some of the trails in the park have been given Dakota names. The Sakatah Singing Hills State Trail, which connects Faribault and Mankato, runs through this park.

== Natural history ==
The park sits on a thick moraine deposited during the Wisconsin glaciation, resulting in a rolling and uneven topography. Blocks of ice left behind as the glaciers melted formed the basin in which Sakatah Lake now lies.

The park preserves a mixed transitional habitat where the Big Woods (maple, basswood, elm) of central Minnesota blend into the oak barrens of the southern part of the state. During drier eras patches of prairie arose, although they are now succeeding back to hardwood forests. The landscape is further diversified by wetlands and agricultural fields.

== Wildlife ==
This park is home to white-tailed deer, rabbits, squirrels, raccoon, minks, and coyotes. These mammals are commonly seen by visitors. Bird watchers get an opportunity to view songbirds, woodpeckers, various hawks, and various owls in this park.

== Cultural history ==
The Wahpekute band of Dakota Sioux traditionally inhabited this area, using the Cannon River as an important transportation route. Some of their burial mounds remain in the park. European settlement came in the late 1800s, and a rail line was laid between Faribault and Waterville in 1882, and extended to Mankato by 1886. By chance the forest on the south shore of Sakatah Lake was never logged, and a 1962 inquiry into making it a state park received much local support. The site was included in a bill that passed the next year which authorized fourteen state parks. Development occurred over the next few years and Sakatah Lake State Park officially opened to the public in 1967. Although there was a rail line running through the park, it was only occasionally used, and in 1976 the owners abandoned it entirely and willingly sold it to the state, which converted it into the Sakatah Singing Hills State Trail.

== Recreation ==
- Boating: The park has a public boat ramp and four rental canoes.
- Camping:
  - Shaded campground with 62 sites and one camper cabin.
  - Two primitive group camps accessible by road at the east end of the park.
  - Camping area for travelers on the Sakatah Singing Hills State Trail.
- Fishing: There is a fishing pier near the picnic area.
- Trails: There is a total of 39 miles (63 km) of trails in the park, most of them well-shaded.
  - Sakatah Singing Hills State Trail (hiking/biking/roller-blading/snowmobiling)
  - Oak Tree/Utahu Can Trail - Hidden Pond Trail - Sumac Trail (hiking/skiing): These three trails form a loop around the center of the park.
  - Big Woods/Tanka Canwitc Loop (hiking/skiing): A 1 km loop accessible from either of the trail systems listed above.
  - Wahpekute Trail (hiking): The least developed trail in the park runs right along the lakeshore.
  - Timber Doodle Trail (hiking/skiing): A level loop through the more exposed scrub area in the eastern part of the park.
- There is no designated swimming area in the park. The shore is quite muddy.
