= Waterville-Elysian-Morristown School District 2143 =

School district in Minnesota, United States

Address
- 500 East Paquin Street Waterville, Minnesota, 56096; United States

District information
- Type: Public
- Grades: PreK–12
- NCES District ID: 2700013

Students and staff
- Students: 760
- Teachers: 63.71
- Staff: 54.87
- Student–teacher ratio: 11.93

Other information
- Website: wem.k12.mn.us

Waterville-Elysian-Morristown School District 2143 is a school district headquartered in Waterville, Minnesota.

It serves the communities of Waterville, Morristown, and Elysian.

== Schools ==
- Waterville-Elysian-Morristown High School (Waterville)
- Waterville Elementary School (Waterville)
