= Sakatah Singing Hills State Trail =

Rail trail in Minnesota, United States

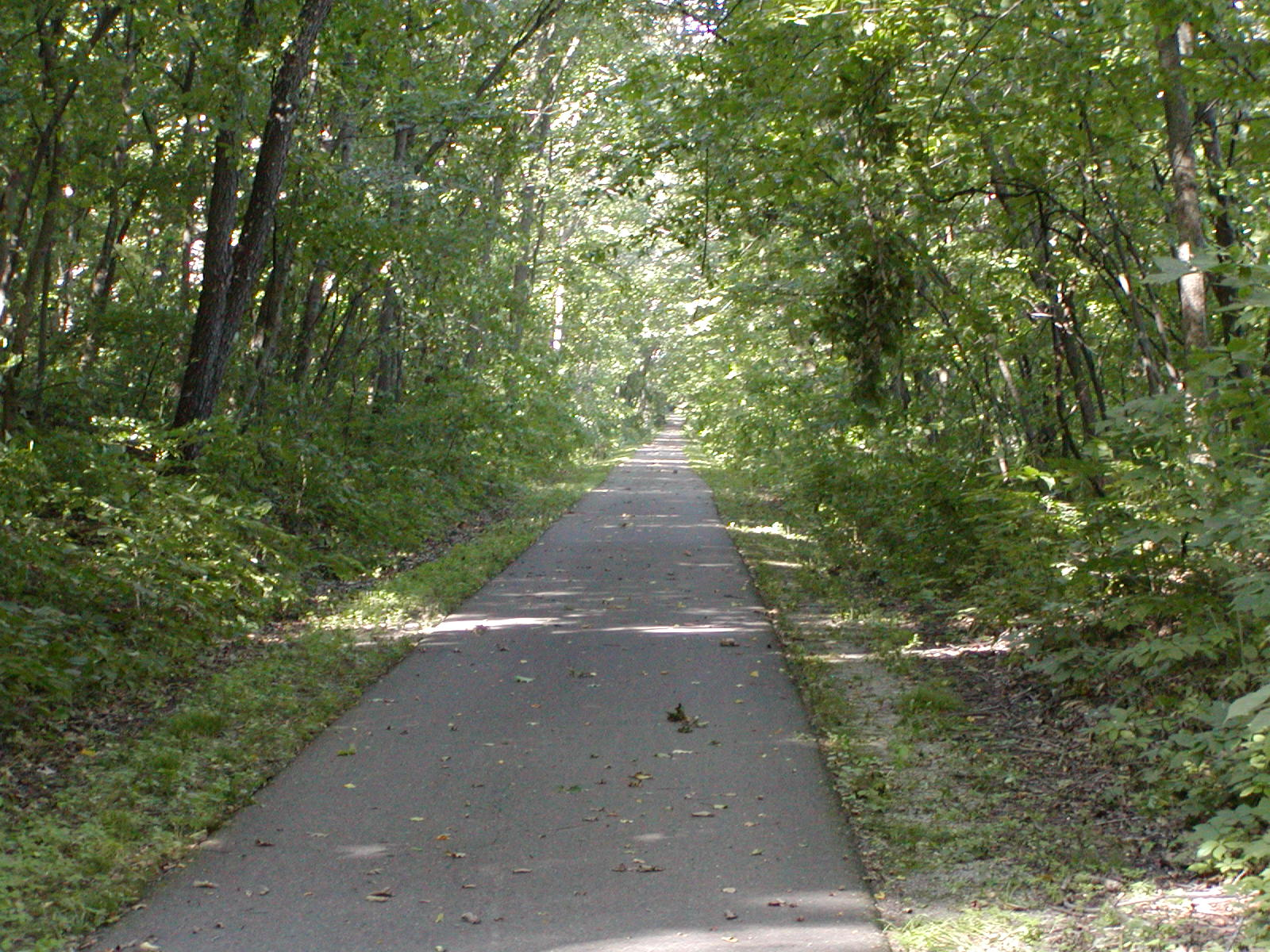
- Sakatah Singing Hills State Trail in Sakatah Lake State Park
- Length: 41 mi (66 km)
- Location: Minnesota, USA
- Trailheads: Faribault; Mankato
- Use: Bicycling, hiking, in-line skating, horseback riding, snowmobiling, cross-country skiing
- Difficulty: Easy
- Months: Year-round
- Sights: Cannon River, Sakatah Lake State Park

Sakatah Singing Hills State Trail is a 41-mile-long (66 km) paved multi-use rail trail connecting Faribault and Mankato, Minnesota. It is maintained by the Minnesota Department of Natural Resources, which converted it from a railroad line. The name derives from the Dakota people who lived in the region; "Sakatah" translates into "singing hills". It began as a snowmobile trail and is now shared by hikers, joggers and cross-country skiers. There are sections of parallel dirt trail for horseback riders but they are not continuous. The landscape is mostly cultivated land with remnant stands of prairie and Big Woods. The trail passes through Sakatah Lake State Park and runs through city streets in Waterville.

== History ==
The trail uses segments from two different rail lines that were built into Mankato, one from the Chicago Great Western Railway (CGW), and one from the Chicago and North Western Transportation Company (C&NW).

The more southern C&NW rail line was the original Winona and St. Peter Railroad, one of the first railroads in Minnesota. Originally it curved north in the Lime valley away from Mankato towards Kasota to St. Peter in 1871. It branched south at what became Mankato Junction, also known as Burdette. This was the segment of the Winona, Mankato and New Ulm Railway.

The more northern CGW rail line was surveyed in the late 1870s between Red Wing and Waterville. Construction did not begin until 1882 by the Central Railway Company of Minnesota under the management of A. B. Stickney. Stickney was head of the Minnesota & Northwestern Railroad which would later become the Chicago Great Western Railway in 1891. The route from Red Wing to Waterville was completed in 1882, and the route from Waterville to Mankato, Minnesota, was completed in 1887. By 1889, the line had been renamed Wisconsin, Minnesota & Pacific and was under the trusteeship of the Rock Island railroad. The Rock Island sold the WM&P to the Chicago Great Western in the mid-1890s which operated the line until 1968 when the CGW was merged in to the Chicago & Northwestern.

The C&NW operated the line for a few years after the CGW merger, but abandoned the portion from Lime Siding east in the early 1970s. The C&NW, working with the State of Minnesota, used the more favorable CGW grade into Mankato. The C&NW built a link between the two lines where they neared each other on the outskirts of Mankato before they both descended into the Minnesota River Valley. The Dakota, Minnesota and Eastern Railroad uses these joined segments as its Tracy Subdivision. The remaining segments became the trail, with a route necessary around a farm that had taken over the abandoned route across from Lime Siding.

Area snowmobile riders began using the trail. The State's acquisition of the route, with their view toward creating a rail trail, began in 1974. The Sakatah Singing Hills State Trail was officially dedicated in 1980. It was a dirt trail for its first decade. The entire length was paved in 1995.

== Related Trails ==
The section of the Chicago Great Western from Cannon Falls to Red Wing is now the Cannon Valley Trail. The section of the Chicago Great Western Railway between Faribault and Cannon Falls is being developed by the Mill Towns Trail Association which would result in the former route of the entire Chicago Great Western from Mankato to Red Wing being converted to trail use.
