= German Lake (Le Sueur County, Minnesota) =

Lake in the state of Minnesota, United States

- Location within Minnesota
- Location: Le Sueur County, Minnesota
- Coordinates: 44°16.5′N 93°43.5′W
- Type: lake

German Lake is a lake in Le Sueur County, in the U.S. state of Minnesota. A majority of the early settlers near the lake being natives of Germany caused the name to be selected. The lake is fed from Lake Jefferson through a connecting culvert, and is part of the Cannon River watershed.

== See also ==
- List of lakes in Minnesota
