= Welch Village =

American ski area near Red Wing, Minnesota

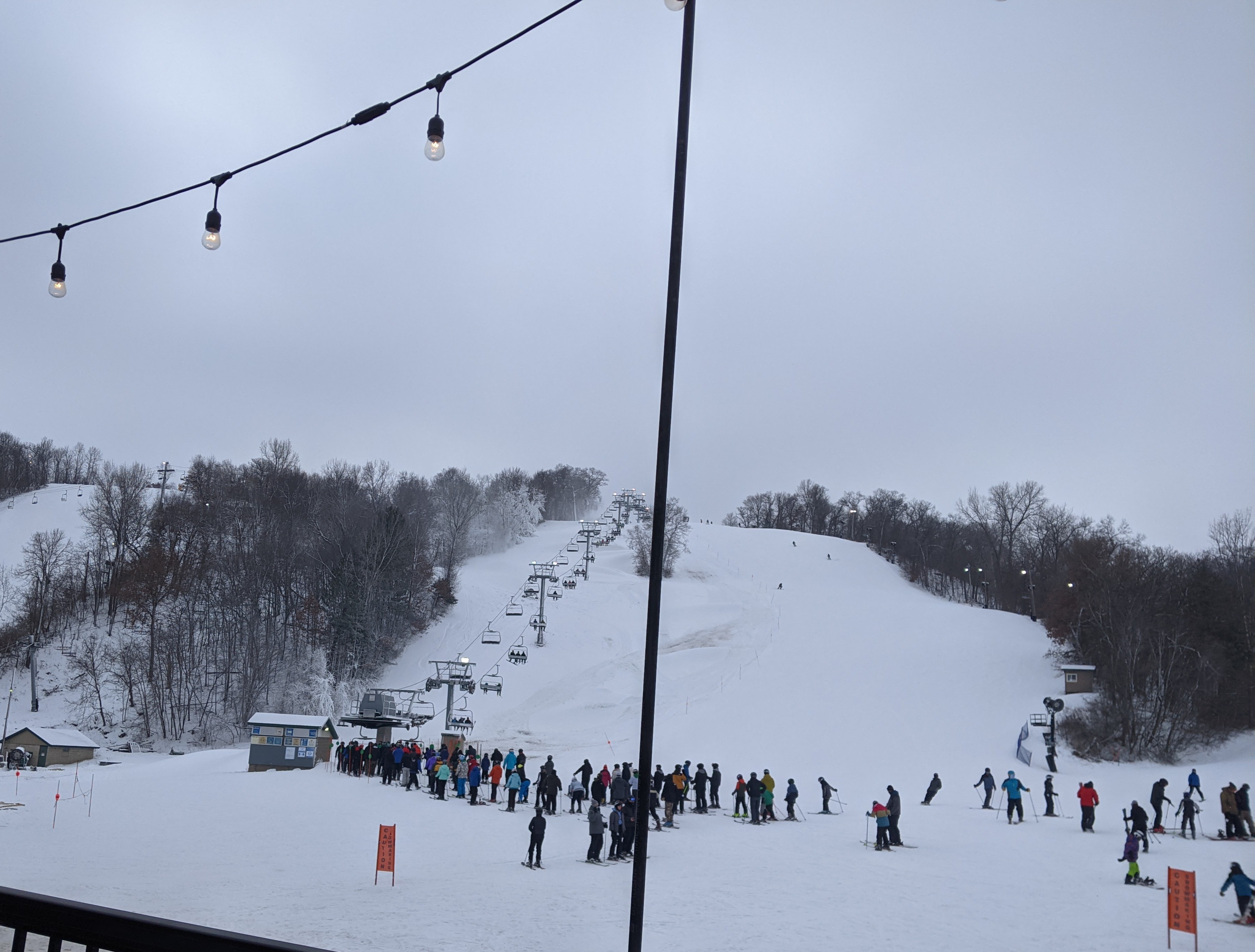
- One of Welch Village's lifts in 2020
- Interactive map of Welch Village
- Location: Vasa Township, Goodhue County, Minnesota
- Nearest city: Red Wing, Minnesota, USA
- Coordinates: 44°33′38″N 92°43′38″W
- Vertical: 360 ft (110 m)
- Top elevation: 1,060 ft (320 m)
- Base elevation: 700 ft (210 m)
- Skiable area: 140 acres (0.57 km^{2})
- Trails: 50
- Lift system: 7 Quads, 1 Triple, 2 Magic Carpets, 1 Rope Tow, 1 Portable Rope Tow
- Terrain parks: Two terrain parks
- Snowfall: 45 inches
- Snowmaking: Yes, 100% coverage
- Night skiing: Yes
- Website: welchvillage.com

Welch Village is an American ski area near Red Wing, Minnesota. It was built by Leigh and Clem Nelson in 1965. It has a vertical elevation of approximately 360 feet (110 m). It is located near the Cannon River Valley. The area offers both skiing and snowboarding and has beginner, intermediate and expert slopes.

== History ==
In 1962, brothers Clem and Leigh Nelson purchased 240 acres of wooded hillside facing the Cannon River. After several years of preparation, Welch Village Ski Area opened in 1965, with a 3,500 square-foot chalet.

In 1971, Welch added an 80-unit dormitory and a 120-acre land expansion.

Since 1975, Welch has hosted the Welch Village Invitational, the largest high school alpine ski race event in the United States.

Leigh from his job as an engineer at 3M and bought out his brother Clem and became the sole owner in 1993.

In 2008, Welch opened a new "back bowl" with 15 new runs across 80 acres, serviced by a 1,300-foot quad lift. The bowl consists of only black-steepness runs, some with over 300 feet of vertical drop.

Welch Village has a large chalet with two cafeteria-style restaurants. Madd Jaxx bar serves alcohol near the triple lift on the east side of the resort.

There are eight chairlifts and four surface lifts at Welch Village: a Riblet Triple chairlift (1979), three Doppelmayr Quad chairlifts (2008/2010/2021), three Riblet Quad chairlifts (1989/1990/1999), a SkyTrac Quad chairlift (2025), two Magic Carpet surface lifts, a fixed rope tow, and a portable rope tow.

Leigh Nelson died in 2023 at the age of 94. As of 2023, Welch is operated by his grandson, Peter Zotalis.
