= German Lake (Otter Tail County, Minnesota) =

Lake in the state of Minnesota, United States

- Location within Minnesota
- Location: Otter Tail County, Minnesota
- Coordinates: 46°16′10″N 95°50′57″W
- Type: lake

German Lake is a lake in Otter Tail County, in the U.S. state of Minnesota.

German Lake was so named on account of a German pioneer having settled there.

== See also ==
- List of lakes in Minnesota
