= Welch Township, Goodhue County, Minnesota =

Welch Township, Minnesota
- Township
- Location within the state of Minnesota Welch Township, Minnesota (the United States)
- Coordinates: 44°38′7″N 92°43′38″W
- Country: United States
- State: Minnesota
- County: Goodhue County

Area
  - Total: 42.7 sq mi (110.7 km^{2})
  - Land: 39.3 sq mi (101.8 km^{2})
  - Water: 3.4 sq mi (8.9 km^{2})
- Elevation: 974 ft (297 m)

Population (2000)
  - Total: 697
  - Density: 18/sq mi (6.8/km^{2})
- Time zone: UTC-6 (Central (CST))
  - Summer (DST): UTC-5 (CDT)
- ZIP code: 55089
- Area code: 651
- FIPS code: 27-69052
- GNIS feature ID: 0665947

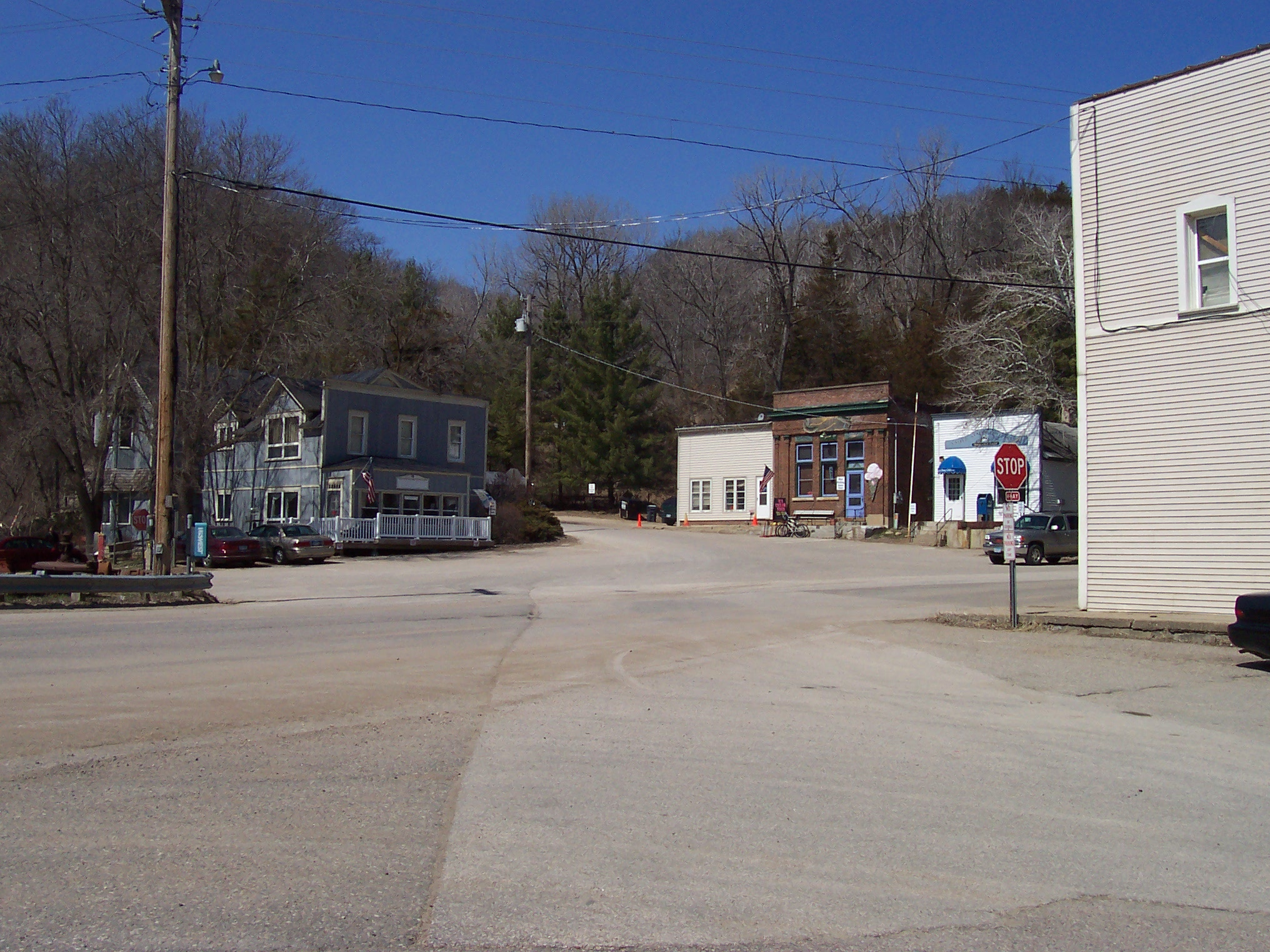
Central Welch

Welch Township is a township in Goodhue County, Minnesota, United States. It lies about halfway between the cities of Hastings and Red Wing and 36 miles southeast of Saint Paul. The population was 697 at the 2000 census. It is centered on the small community of Welch on the Cannon River. Like many river towns in the Driftless Area, it is situated at the base of the steep bluffs of the river valley.

== History ==
We do not know when Welch was really organized and it was named Eagle Mills first. Welch Township was organized in 1864, and named for Abraham Edwards Welch, a local man who was killed in the Civil War.

== Geography ==
According to the United States Census Bureau, the township has a total area of 42.7 square miles (110.7 km^{2}), of which 39.3 square miles (101.8 km^{2}) is land and 3.4 square miles (8.9 km^{2}) (8.03%) is water.

== Demographics ==
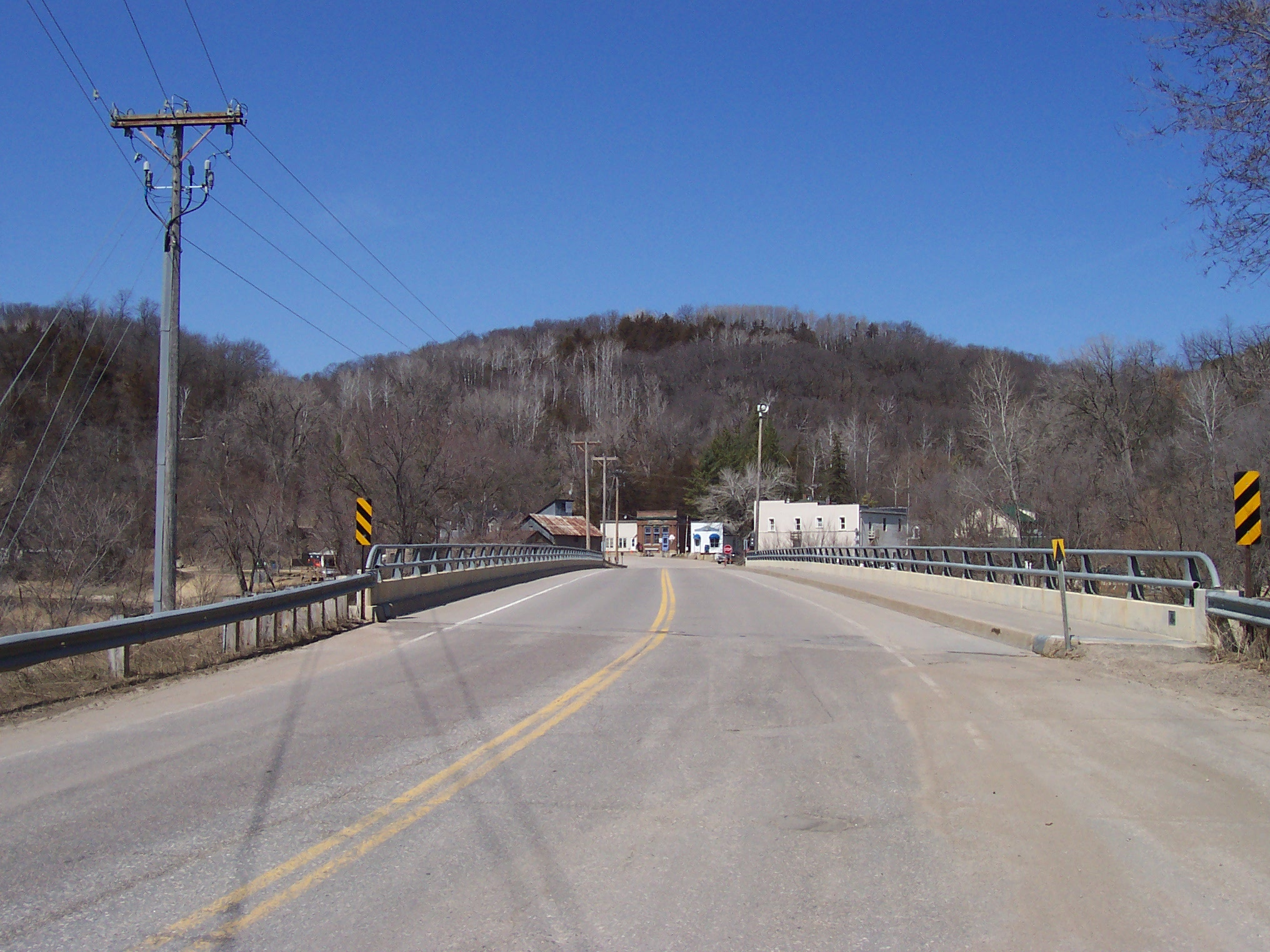
Welch as seen from across the Cannon River

As of the census of 2000, there were 697 people, 249 households, and 192 families residing in the township. The population density was 17.7 people per square mile (6.8/km^{2}). There were 261 housing units at an average density of 6.6/sq mi (2.6/km^{2}). The racial makeup of the township was 97.99% White, 0.14% African American, 1.29% Native American, 0.14% Asian, and 0.43% from two or more races. Hispanic or Latino of any race were 0.57% of the population.

There were 249 households, out of which 34.5% had children under the age of 18 living with them, 69.5% were married couples living together, 4.0% had a female householder with no husband present, and 22.5% were non-families. 17.7% of all households were made up of individuals, and 4.4% had someone living alone who was 65 years of age or older. The average household size was 2.79 and the average family size was 3.13.

In the township the population was spread out, with 24.5% under the age of 18, 9.5% from 18 to 24, 29.6% from 25 to 44, 26.8% from 45 to 64, and 9.6% who were 65 years of age or older. The median age was 39 years. For every 100 females, there were 113.1 males. For every 100 females age 18 and over, there were 115.6 males.

The median income for a household in the township was $60,536, and the median income for a family was $61,406. Males had a median income of $38,409 versus $25,156 for females. The per capita income for the township was $23,023. About 4.6% of families and 5.6% of the population were below the poverty line, including 6.6% of those under age 18 and 9.2% of those age 65 or over.

== Film ==
The film Here on Earth was mostly shot in Welch. It starred Minnesotan Josh Hartnett, along with Leelee Sobieski and Chris Klein. It is a romantic drama. Most of the set was built for the film but parts of it can still be seen around the town.
