= Jordan Formation =

Geologic formation in the United States

- Stratigraphic range: Late Cambrian
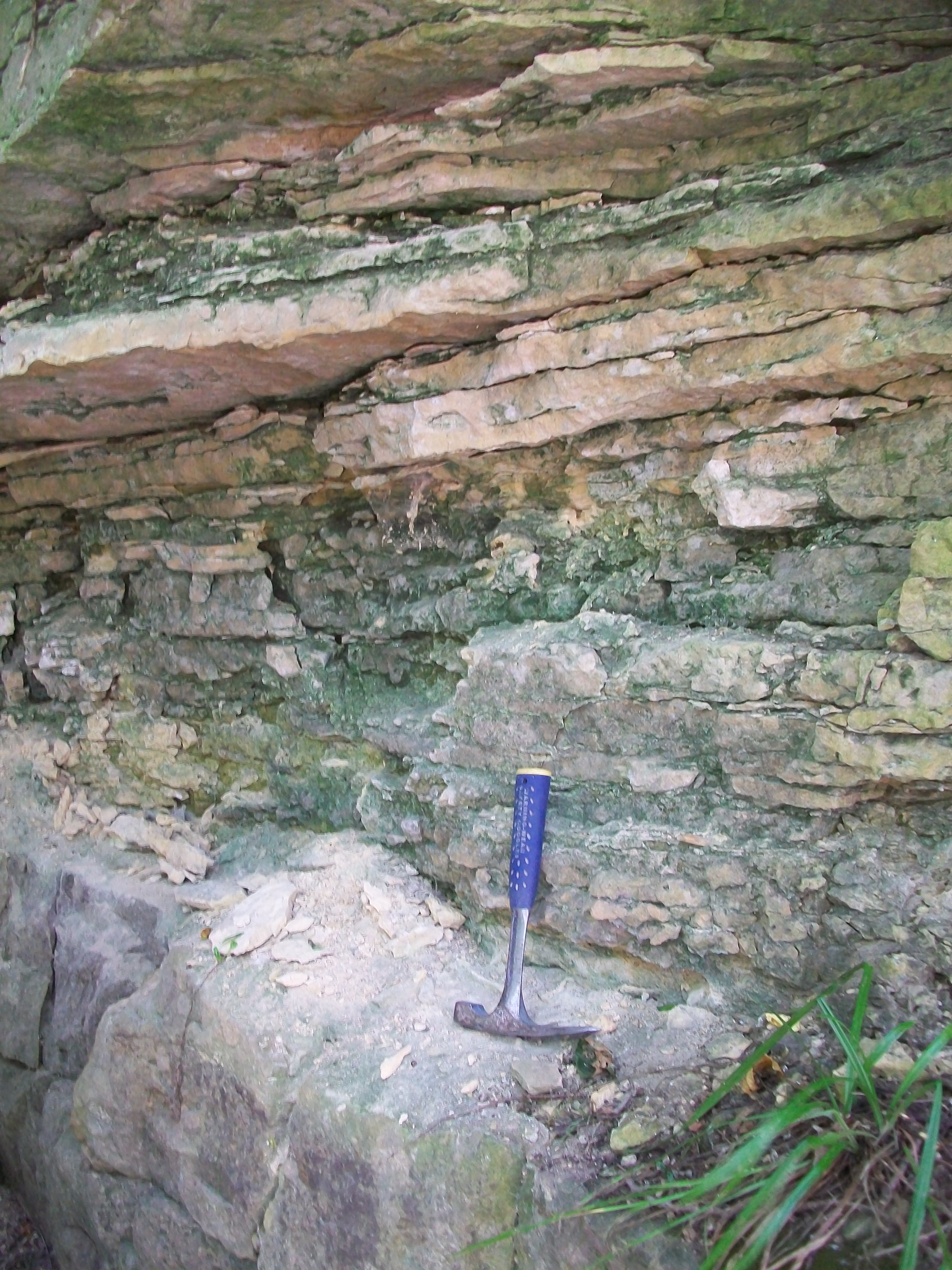
- Outcrop of the Jordan Sandstone at Hoyt Park, Madison, WI. The rock-hammer rests near the contact of the Van Oser Member and overlying Sunset Point Member.
- Type: Geological formation
- Unit of: Trempealeau Group
- Sub-units: Norwalk Member, Van Oser Member, Waukon Member, Sunset Point Member
- Underlies: Oneota Formation of the Prairie du Chien Group
- Overlies: St. Lawrence Formation of the Trempealeau Group
- Thickness: 15–115 m (49–377 ft)

Lithology
- Primary: sandstone

Location
- Region: Iowa Shelf, Wisconsin Arch, Lincoln Anticline, Michigan Basin
- Country: United States
- Extent: Minnesota, Wisconsin, Illinois, Michigan, Iowa, Missouri

Type section
- Named for: Jordan, Minnesota
- Named by: N. H. Winchell (1874)

The Jordan Formation (also classified as the Jordan Sandstone or the Jordan Member of the Trempealeau Formation) is a siliciclastic sedimentary rock unit identified in Illinois, Michigan, Wisconsin, Minnesota, and Iowa. Named for distinctive outcrops in the Minnesota River Valley near the town of Jordan, it extends throughout the Iowa Shelf and eastward over the Wisconsin Arch and Lincoln anticline into the Michigan Basin.

Stratigraphically, the Jordan Formation is the uppermost unit of the type St. Croixan Series (historically, the uppermost subdivision of the Cambrian in North America). It is predominantly composed of mature, poorly cemented quartz sandstone, though several distinct facies have been identified on the basis of grain size, feldspathic content, and sedimentary structures.

The Jordan is an important source of silica. Historically, the unit has been mined extensively for glass manufacturing, though recently it has been utilized as a source of frac sand. This porous, poorly cemented stratum is also an important aquifer and a major source of drinking water for people throughout the upper Midwest.

== Definition and history ==
The earliest references to strata now referred to as Jordan were made by many of the pioneering geologists of the upper Midwest. In an 1852 report on the geology of Wisconsin, Iowa, and Minnesota, D. D. Owen assigned it to the uppermost part of his “Lower Sandstone” (the “Upper Sandstone” referring to what is now called the St. Peter). The term Jordan Sandstone was first applied in 1874 by N. H. Winchell, who based his description on exposures in a quarry near Jordan, Minnesota.

== Extent ==
The Jordan Formation is represented extensively by outcrops and exposures throughout Wisconsin, Minnesota, and Iowa Geologic Map of Wisconsin; Geologic Map of Minnesota). It is particularly well represented in outcrops along the Mississippi River and its tributaries. It is also present in the subsurface in many parts of these states, and it has been identified in cores and drill cuttings in Illinois, Missouri, and Michigan as well (though here, it is not found at the surface).

Beyond this region, rocks of similar age are present, though they are referred to other lithostratigraphic units. Presumed lateral equivalents of the Jordan Formation include the Eminence Dolostone of the Illinois Basin, the Au Train Formation of the northern Michigan Basin, and some horizon of the Knox Supergroup in the east-central United States.

== Sedimentology ==
The Jordan Formation is composed primarily of very mature, well-sorted sandstones of uncertain provenance. Although it is composed primarily of quartz grains, feldspathic and lithic fragments are present in significant quantities, as are a variety of bioclasts derived from marine invertebrates.

At least three distinct facies types have been identified and distinguished on the basis of sedimentary structures and grain size: a hummocky cross stratified facies, a trough-cross stratified facies, and a large scale-cross stratified facies. Overall, the Jordan Formation displays a coarsening upward sequence.

== Stratigraphy ==
Generally, the Jordan Sandstone is assigned formational rank and considered the uppermost subdivision of the Trempealeau Group (though it is sometimes ranked as the uppermost Member of the Trempealeau Formation). Although the original type section is no longer exposed, a new reference section is defined at an exposure near Homer, Minnesota in Winona County, where several distinct tongues of the formation are seen intertonguing. The Jordan Sandstone ranges from 15 to 115 meters (49 to 377 ft).

=== Underlying ===
The lower Jordan contains relatively high proportions of feldspathic material and its lower contact is fairly gradational. Throughout much of the upper Midwest, it overlies the St. Lawrence Formation, which consists of a dolomitic facies (the Black Earth Member) and a silty facies (the Lodi Member). Earlier studies often combined the Jordan and the St. Lawrence, though they may be distinguished on the basis of lithology. The contact between these units is generally set at the top of the uppermost siltstone bed of the Lodi, where it is overlain by a continuous layer of sandstone.

=== Overlying ===
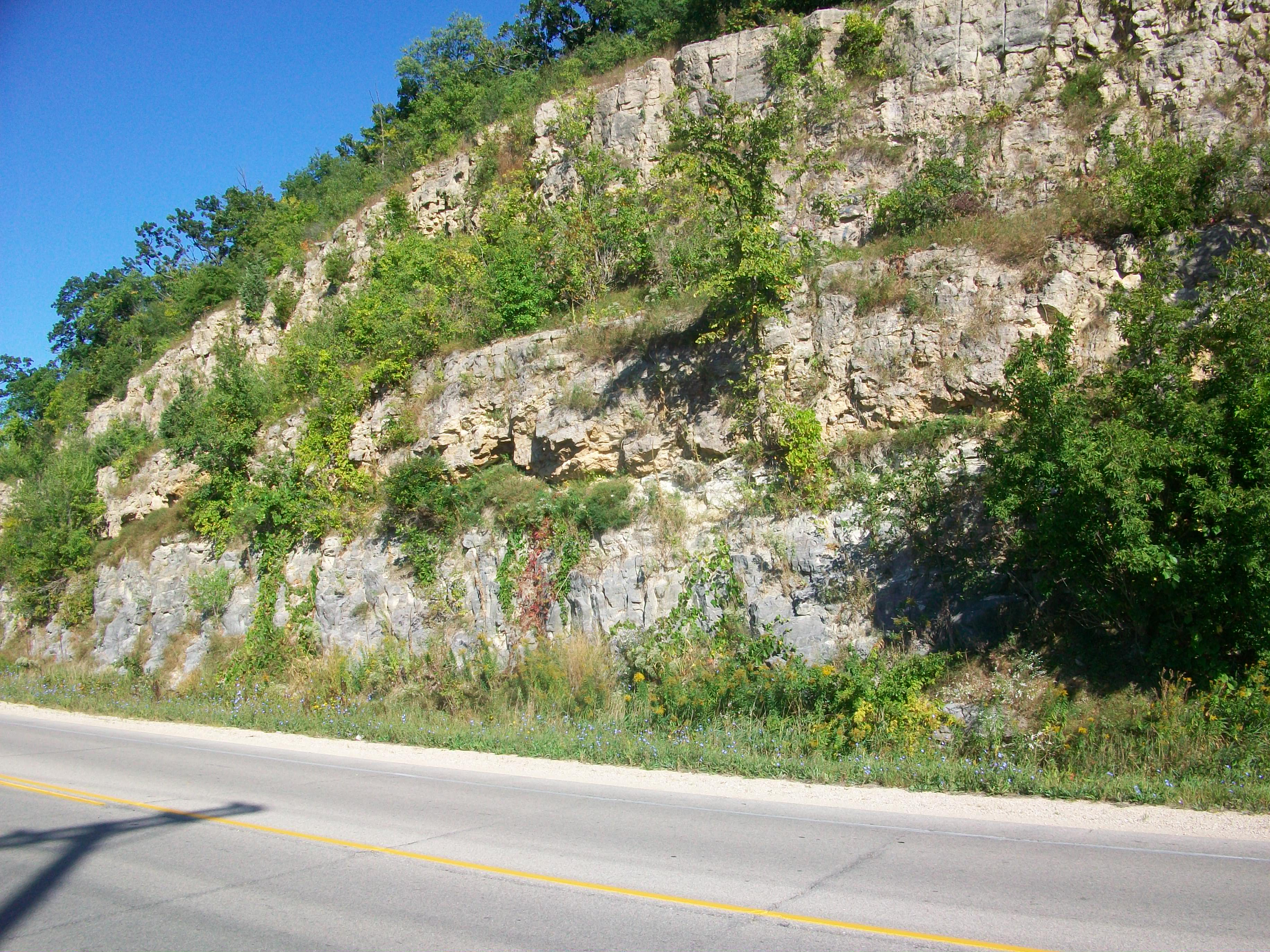
An outcrop of late Cambrian and early Ordovician rocks in a road-cut at Miller's Curve, just to the west of Madison, Wisconsin. The Jordan sandstone is the light grey rock in the lower third of this outcrop, the Oneota (dolomitic carbonate) is the orange grey rock in the upper two thirds of the road-cut.

The Jordan is overlain by the Oneota Formation, a dolomitic carbonate unit of early Ordovician Age. The massive, well-cemented microbial carbonates of the Oneota Formation generally overlie several meters of sandy shale with calcareous interbeds referred to as Coon Valley or Stockton Hill Member. Although these beds have traditionally been allied with the Jordan Formation based on lithostratigraphic properties, but more recent sequence and biostratigraphic studies suggest it is more closely allied with the Oneota. The upper contact of the Jordan is interpreted to be a topographically complex, unconformable surface.

=== Subunits ===
The Jordan has at least four named subdivisions distinguished on the basis of sedimentary structures, grain size, and stratigraphic position. The basal Norwalk Member is composed of fine grained hummocky-stratified sandstone containing a relatively high proportion of feldspar. This subunit is heavily bioturbated, and contains occasional fossils of marine organisms.

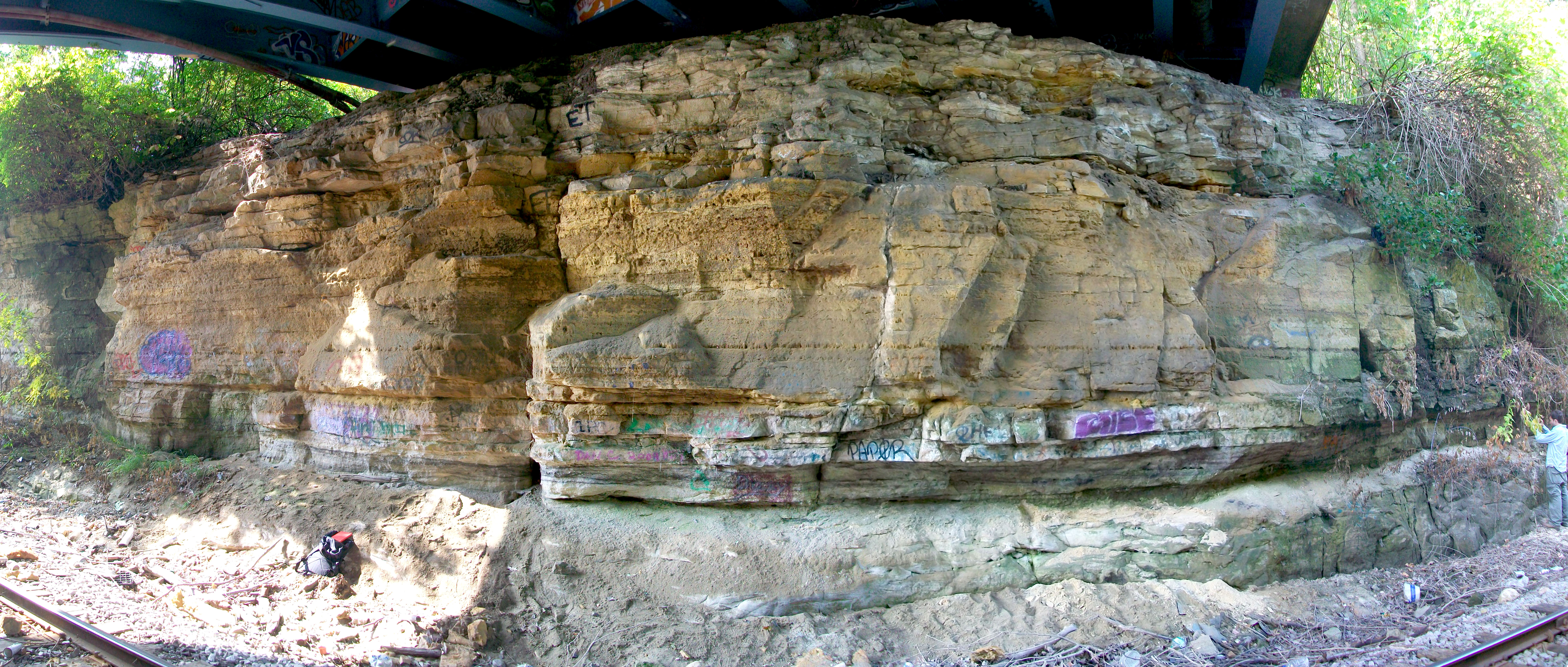
A photo-mosaic of the Jordan Formation at Mendota Station, a few miles north of Madison, Wisconsin. The lower Van Oser Member is at the base, Sunset Point Member is in the middle, and Upper Van Oser Member is at the top.

The Norwalk is generally overlain by the Van Oser Member, a medium-grained trough-cross stratified quartz sandstone facies. At least two tongues of this facies are present in the Jordan Formation, generally separated by either a fine-grained hummocky stratified sandstone called the Waukon Member, or a bioturbated, laminated feldspathic quartz sandstone with dolomitic cement, which is called the Sunset Point Member.

== Depositional history ==
=== Deposition ===
Owing to the presence of rare fossils and bioturbated sediments, the Jordan Formation is interpreted as a product of marine depositional environments. The bioturbated, fine-grained facies are interpreted as lower shoreface deposits influenced by tidal fluctuations and storms. The coarser, cross-bedded deposits, such as the Van Oser, may be deposits of large, submarine dunes.

The Jordan is one of many “sheet sandstones” which covered a large swath of the continent during the late Cambrian. At this time, most of North America was covered by shallow sea, blanketed by laterally continuous sheets of sandstone and carbonate covering tens of thousands of square kilometers (the Paleozoic orthoquartzite-carbonate suite).

=== Age ===
The Jordan Formation has long been regarded as Upper Cambrian, more specifically, it encompasses part of the Saukia trilobite biozone, as determined by the presence of trilobites such as Tellerina strigosa. Conodonts from the Norwalk Member suggest assignment to the Eoconodontus zone, which corroborates the ages provided by trilobites.

The overlying Oneota Formation is early Ordovician in age, as indicated by conodonts and trilobites. This suggests that the Cambrian-Ordovician boundary should reside either in the upper Jordan, or at the contact with the overlying Oneota. But this is still an area of active study.

== Economic impact ==
=== Frac sand ===
The well-sorted, well-rounded sediments of the Jordan Formation are mined extensively as a proppant for hydraulic fracturing. The sand is commonly added to fracking fluids for the purpose of keeping induced hydraulic fractures open. The thickness of the unit, its relatively poor cementation, and its close proximity to major waterways and roadways has made it a lucrative target for mining companies.

=== Groundwater ===
The coarse grained Jordan Formation is poorly cemented, and it has a low clay content, meaning the unit is highly permeable. These properties make it an excellent aquifer, which extends throughout the north-central United States.

== See also ==
- Baraboo Quartzite
- Cambrian
- Driftless Area
- Nonesuch Shale
- Potsdam Sandstone
- St. Peter Sandstone
