= German Lake (Isanti County, Minnesota) =

Lake in the state of Minnesota, United States

- Location within Minnesota
- Location: Isanti County, Minnesota
- Coordinates: 45°28′42″N 93°23′15″W
- Type: lake

German Lake is a lake in Isanti County, in the U.S. state of Minnesota.

A large share of the first settlers beside German Lake were natives of Germany, hence the name.

== See also ==
- List of lakes in Minnesota
