= Waterville, Minnesota =

City in Minnesota, United States

- City
- Motto: "A Town of Friendly People"
- Location of Waterville, Minnesota
- Coordinates: 44°13′24″N 93°34′27″W
- Country: United States
- State: Minnesota
- County: Le Sueur

Government
  - Type: Mayor - Council
  - Mayor: William "Bill" Conlin

Area
  - Total: 2.07 sq mi (5.35 km^{2})
  - Land: 1.69 sq mi (4.37 km^{2})
  - Water: 0.38 sq mi (0.98 km^{2})
- Elevation: 1,004 ft (306 m)

Population (2020)
  - Total: 1,750
  - Density: 1,037.9/sq mi (400.74/km^{2})
- Time zone: UTC-6 (Central (CST))
  - Summer (DST): UTC-5 (CDT)
- ZIP code: 56096
- Area code: 507
- FIPS code: 27-68584
- GNIS feature ID: 2397212
- Website: cityofwatervillemn.gov

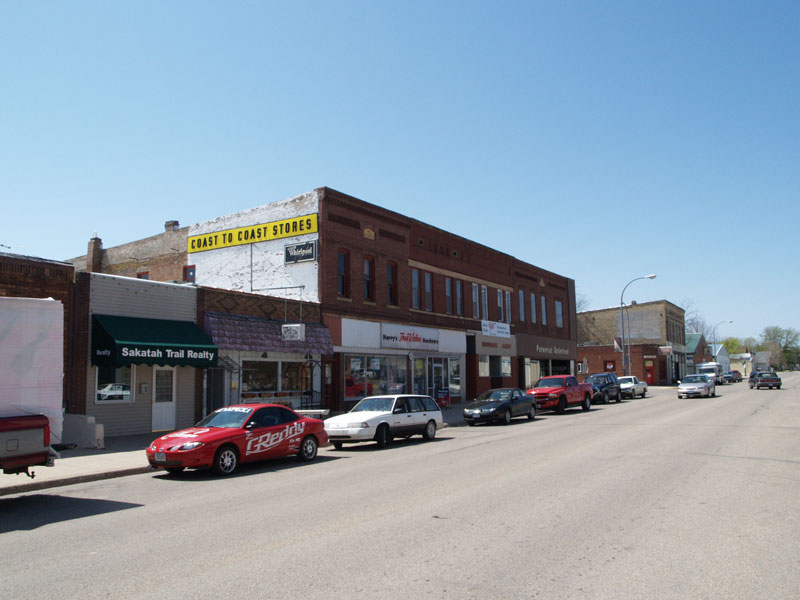
Downtown Waterville, Minnesota

Waterville is a city in Le Sueur County, Minnesota, United States. The population was 1,750 at the 2020 census. It is close to Sakatah Lake State Park on the Cannon River.

Waterville has a yearly celebration called "Bullhead Days," and it is held in early June; the residents of the town get together for food, fun, a parade, a carnival, and fireworks.

== History ==
Waterville was platted in 1856 by nine New England natives. The name "Waterville" comes from, Waterville, Maine, E.I. Wright's, a member of the group, hometown. It is also mixed with the fact that it is positioned between Lake Tetonka and Lake Sakatah. A post office has been in operation at Waterville since 1856. Waterville was incorporated as a city in 1898.

== Geography ==
According to the United States Census Bureau, the city has a total area of 2.34 square miles (6.06 km^{2}), of which 1.70 square miles (4.40 km^{2}) is land and 0.64 square miles (1.66 km^{2}) is water.

Minnesota State Highways 13 and 60 are two of the main routes in the city.

== Demographics ==
Historical population
Census	Pop.	Note	%±
1880	498		—
1890	937		88.2%
1900	1,260		34.5%
1910	1,273		1.0%
1920	1,211		−4.9%
1930	1,419		17.2%
1940	1,600		12.8%
1950	1,627		1.7%
1960	1,623		−0.2%
1970	1,539		−5.2%
1980	1,717		11.6%
1990	1,771		3.1%
2000	1,833		3.5%
2010	1,868		1.9%
2020	1,750		−6.3%
U.S. Decennial Census; 2018 Estimate

=== 2020 census ===
As of the 2020 census, Waterville had a population of 1,750. The median age was 46.3 years. 20.7% of residents were under the age of 18 and 22.5% of residents were 65 years of age or older. For every 100 females there were 101.1 males, and for every 100 females age 18 and over there were 103.7 males age 18 and over.

0.0% of residents lived in urban areas, while 100.0% lived in rural areas.

There were 802 households in Waterville, of which 23.4% had children under the age of 18 living in them. Of all households, 43.1% were married-couple households, 22.8% were households with a male householder and no spouse or partner present, and 25.6% were households with a female householder and no spouse or partner present. About 35.5% of all households were made up of individuals and 15.7% had someone living alone who was 65 years of age or older.

There were 935 housing units, of which 14.2% were vacant. The homeowner vacancy rate was 2.7% and the rental vacancy rate was 3.8%.

Racial composition as of the 2020 census
Race	Number	Percent
White	1,628	93.0%
Black or African American	22	1.3%
American Indian and Alaska Native	11	0.6%
Asian	3	0.2%
Native Hawaiian and Other Pacific Islander	0	0.0%
Some other race	6	0.3%
Two or more races	80	4.6%
Hispanic or Latino (of any race)	51	2.9%

=== 2010 census ===
As of the census of 2010, there were 1,868 people, 785 households, and 486 families living in the city. The population density was 1,098.8 inhabitants per square mile (424.2/km^{2}). There were 963 housing units at an average density of 566.5 per square mile (218.7/km^{2}). The racial makeup of the city was 96.9% White, 0.4% African American, 1.0% Native American, 0.3% Asian, 0.2% from other races, and 1.2% from two or more races. Hispanic or Latino of any race were 1.8% of the population.

There were 785 households, of which 29.2% had children under the age of 18 living with them, 45.0% were married couples living together, 10.7% had a female householder with no husband present, 6.2% had a male householder with no wife present, and 38.1% were non-families. 33.1% of all households were made up of individuals, and 14.4% had someone living alone who was 65 years of age or older. The average household size was 2.28 and the average family size was 2.87.

The median age in the city was 42.4 years. 22.7% of residents were under the age of 18; 7.2% were between the ages of 18 and 24; 23.1% were from 25 to 44; 26.9% were from 45 to 64; and 19.9% were 65 years of age or older. The gender makeup of the city was 48.1% male and 51.9% female.

=== 2000 census ===
As of the census of 2000, there were 1,833 people, 756 households, and 501 families living in the city. The population density was 1,088.8 inhabitants per square mile (420.4/km^{2}). There were 864 housing units at an average density of 513.2 per square mile (198.1/km^{2}). The racial makeup of the city was 97.60% White, 0.11% African American, 0.87% Native American, 0.27% Asian, 0.05% Pacific Islander, and 1.09% from two or more races. Hispanic or Latino of any race were 0.33% of the population.

There were 756 households, out of which 28.4% had children under the age of 18 living with them, 52.4% were married couples living together, 9.3% had a female householder with no husband present, and 33.7% were non-families. 28.8% of all households were made up of individuals, and 13.8% had someone living alone who was 65 years of age or older. The average household size was 2.32 and the average family size was 2.83.

In the city, the population was spread out, with 22.3% under the age of 18, 7.0% from 18 to 24, 25.6% from 25 to 44, 24.4% from 45 to 64, and 20.7% who were 65 years of age or older. The median age was 42 years. For every 100 females, there were 93.2 males. For every 100 females age 18 and over, there were 88.7 males.

The median income for a household in the city was $35,950, and the median income for a family was $45,536. Males had a median income of $32,361 versus $24,327 for females. The per capita income for the city was $17,958. About 6.6% of families and 10.6% of the population were below the poverty line, including 9.8% of those under age 18 and 11.4% of those age 65 or over.

== Education ==
Waterville-Elysian-Morristown School District 2143 operates public schools.

== Notable people ==
- Major A. B. Rogers (1829–1889), railway surveyor who discovered Rogers Pass in British Columbia, Canada. The railway surveyor was not originally from Waterville, but lived there at the end of his life.
- Artist Adolf Dehn was born in Waterville, Minnesota, November 22, 1895, and he died in New York City, May 19, 1968. Two-time recipient of the Guggenheim Fellowship, Dehn was one of the most notable lithographers of the 20th century.
