= Middlings purifier =

Device used in flour production

A middlings purifier is a device used in the production of flour to remove the husks from the kernels of wheat. It was developed in Minnesota by Edmund LaCroix, a French inventor hired by Cadwallader C. Washburn and George Christian of the Washburn "A" Mill. It was developed to complement the emerging roller mill technique of the late 19th century, which used corrugated metal rollers instead of abrasive grindstones to grind wheat into flour. The middlings purifier was used to separate the bran from the usable part of the flour. The machine developed by LaCroix passed the partially ground middlings over a screen, and a stream of air blew away the particles of bran.

This process was used because winter wheat, sown in the fall and harvested early the next summer was not feasible to grow in Minnesota. Spring wheat was sown in the spring and harvested in late summer. This could be grown by Minnesota farmers, but the conventional techniques of grinding grain between millstones ended up producing a darker flour than consumers desired. It was also difficult to mix the gluten and the starch completely. After Washburn's company developed the roller-milling technique with the use of a middlings purifier, they tried to monopolize the method, but the Pillsbury Company and other competitors were able to duplicate the process thanks to employees who left Washburn and passed along trade secrets.

The development of the middling purifier may have been based on the invention of the purifier by Ignaz Paul, an Austrian miller and inventor (1778–1842) early in the 19th century.

Washburn later teamed up with John Crosby to form the Washburn-Crosby Company, which eventually became General Mills.
