= Dundas, Minnesota =

City in Minnesota, United States

Dundas
- City
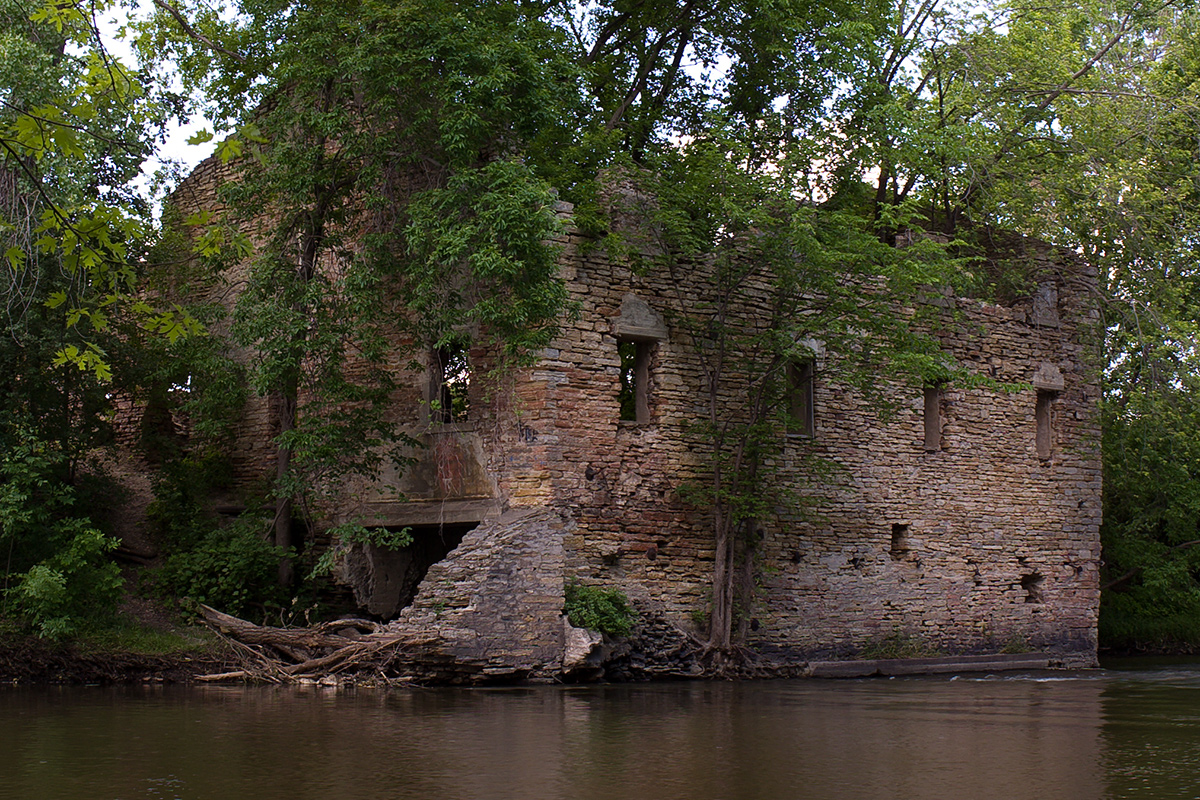
- The historic Archibald Mill on the Cannon River in Dundas, June 2008.
- Motto: "Heaven in MN"
- Location of Dundas, Minnesota
- Coordinates: 44°25′40″N 93°12′14″W
- Country: United States
- State: Minnesota
- County: Rice
- Platted: 1857

Government
  - Type: Mayor-council
  - Mayor: Glenn Switzer

Area
  - Total: 1.85 sq mi (4.78 km^{2})
  - Land: 1.85 sq mi (4.78 km^{2})
  - Water: 0 sq mi (0.00 km^{2})
- Elevation: 925 ft (282 m)

Population (2020)
  - Total: 1,712
  - Estimate (2022): 1,744
  - Density: 926.8/sq mi (357.83/km^{2})
- Time zone: UTC−6 (Central (CST))
  - Summer (DST): UTC−5 (CDT)
- ZIP Code: 55019
- Area code: 507
- FIPS code: 27-17126
- GNIS feature ID: 2394572
- Sales tax: 7.375%
- Website: cityofdundas.org

Dundas (/ˈdʌndəs/ DUN-dəss) is a city in Rice County, Minnesota, United States. The population was 1,712 at the 2020 census. Dundas is bordered by the city of Northfield.

== History ==
Dundas was platted in 1857 by the Archibalds: brothers John Sidney and Edward T., along with their cousin George Archibald, who built mills on both sides of the Cannon River. The brothers named the city after their home Dundas County, Ontario, Canada.

In 1857, the Archibalds founded the Archibald Mill, a flour mill, on the west bank of the Cannon River. The milling industry contributed greatly to Dundas' 19th-century success, and at one point the mills in Dundas were considered among the best in the world. The ruins of the Archibald Mill can still be seen today.

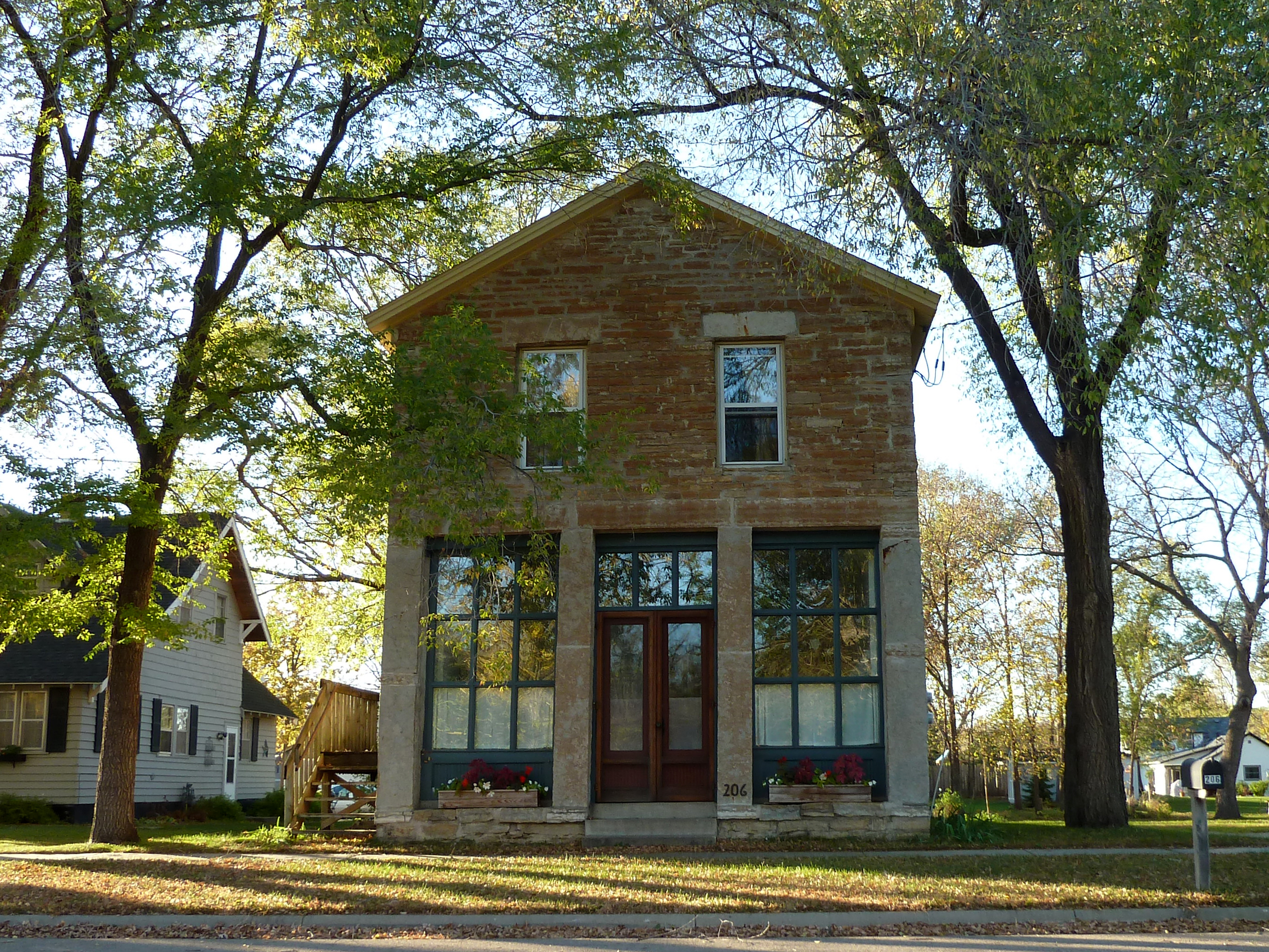
The Ault Store is the only remaining commercial building from Dundas' original business district.

The city's original central business district was located on Second Street, and by 1866 it included two general stores, a library, hotel, shoe store, restaurant, meeting hall and saloon. The neighborhood began to shift once the Minnesota Central Railway built its station on the west side of the river, resulting in the development of Railway Street and the platting of the Railway Addition in 1865. All that remains of the original commercial district is the Ault Store (built in 1866), which started as a general store and housed the town's first library on the second floor; the same building also served as the home of the Dundas News for its operation from 1876 to 1879 when it was bought and absorbed by the Northfield News.

The Archibald Mill, Ault Store, and Edward T. Archibald House are among the five local structures listed on the National Register of Historic Places.

Today, the town is chiefly a bedroom community for nearby Northfield and the more distant Minneapolis-St. Paul metropolitan area. The juxtaposition of Dundas and Northfield and their disparate zoning policies and attitudes toward development have led to some unusual growth patterns. Dundas is home to a number of businesses, such as an off-sale liquor store and two bars that would be unable to get licenses to operate in Northfield. Contrary to popular opinion and local lore, Dundas Technical University (Dundas Tech) only exists on T-shirts and jokes from Northfield and Faribault natives.

Dundas has the only public feed mill within about 40 miles. It is operated by Interstate Mills on the site of the original grain elevator. In 1999, the threat of a Target store being sited in Dundas—rather than Northfield—was instrumental in forcing changes to Northfield's zoning to allow such uses.

A Union Pacific freight railroad line passes through Dundas.

== Geography ==
According to the United States Census Bureau, the city has a total area of 1.92 square miles (4.97 km^{2}), all land. The Cannon River passes through the center of town. The latitude of Dundas is 44.429N. The longitude is 93.204W. Dundas' elevation is 932 feet above sea level.

Minnesota State Highway 3 and Rice County Road 1 are two of the main routes in the community. Interstate 35 is nearby.

== Demographics ==
Historical population
Census	Pop.	Note	%±
1880	589		—
1890	554		−5.9%
1900	493		−11.0%
1910	357		−27.6%
1920	373		4.5%
1930	377		1.1%
1940	456		21.0%
1950	469		2.9%
1960	488		4.1%
1970	460		−5.7%
1980	422		−8.3%
1990	473		12.1%
2000	547		15.6%
2010	1,367		149.9%
2020	1,712		25.2%
2022 (est.)	1,744		1.9%
U.S. Decennial Census; 2020 Census

=== 2020 census ===
As of the 2020 census, Dundas had a population of 1,712. The median age was 35.8 years. 31.2% of residents were under the age of 18 and 12.4% of residents were 65 years of age or older. For every 100 females there were 94.3 males, and for every 100 females age 18 and over there were 93.4 males age 18 and over.

94.6% of residents lived in urban areas, while 5.4% lived in rural areas.

There were 598 households in Dundas, of which 43.8% had children under the age of 18 living in them. Of all households, 60.9% were married-couple households, 11.0% were households with a male householder and no spouse or partner present, and 20.7% were households with a female householder and no spouse or partner present. About 19.0% of all households were made up of individuals and 7.9% had someone living alone who was 65 years of age or older.

There were 618 housing units, of which 3.2% were vacant. The homeowner vacancy rate was 0.2% and the rental vacancy rate was 3.0%.

Racial composition as of the 2020 census
Race	Number	Percent
White	1,474	86.1%
Black or African American	18	1.1%
American Indian and Alaska Native	6	0.4%
Asian	33	1.9%
Native Hawaiian and Other Pacific Islander	0	0.0%
Some other race	62	3.6%
Two or more races	119	7.0%
Hispanic or Latino (of any race)	110	6.4%

=== 2010 census ===
As of the census of 2010, there were 1,367 people, 514 households, and 376 families residing in the city. The population density was 712.0 inhabitants per square mile (274.9/km^{2}). There were 533 housing units at an average density of 277.6 per square mile (107.2/km^{2}). The racial makeup of the city was 93.9% White, 0.7% African American, 0.3% Native American, 1.6% Asian, 2.2% from other races, and 1.3% from two or more races. Hispanic or Latino of any race were 4.6% of the population.

There were 514 households, of which 38.9% had children under the age of 18 living with them, 62.1% were married couples living together, 6.6% had a female householder with no husband present, 4.5% had a male householder with no wife present, and 26.8% were non-families. 20.0% of all households were made up of individuals, and 5.5% had someone living alone who was 65 years of age or older. The average household size was 2.66 and the average family size was 3.08.

The median age in the city was 33.6 years. 27.7% of residents were under the age of 18; 6.2% were between the ages of 18 and 24; 34.5% were from 25 to 44; 23.4% were from 45 to 64; and 8.3% were 65 years of age or older. The gender makeup of the city was 50.6% male and 49.4% female.

=== 2000 census ===
As of the census of 2000, there were 547 people, 213 households, and 146 families residing in the city. The population density was 356.4 inhabitants per square mile (137.6/km^{2}). There were 229 housing units at an average density of 149.2 per square mile (57.6/km^{2}). The racial makeup of the city was 97.26% White, 1.28% African American, 1.10% from other races, and 0.37% from two or more races. Hispanic or Latino of any race were 2.38% of the population.

There were 213 households, out of which 33.8% had children under the age of 18 living with them, 56.3% were married couples living together, 10.8% had a female householder with no husband present, and 31.0% were non-families. 24.9% of all households were made up of individuals, and 8.5% had someone living alone who was 65 years of age or older. The average household size was 2.57 and the average family size was 3.09.

In the city, the population was spread out, with 25.8% under the age of 18, 12.4% from 18 to 24, 33.6% from 25 to 44, 19.2% from 45 to 64, and 9.0% who were 65 years of age or older. The median age was 33 years. For every 100 females, there were 104.9 males. For every 100 females age 18 and over, there were 102.0 males.

The median income for a household in the city was $51,429, and the median income for a family was $55,250. Males had a median income of $32,167 versus $29,306 for females. The per capita income for the city was $20,316. About 4.8% of families and 7.8% of the population were below the poverty line, including 14.8% of those under age 18 and 4.2% of those age 65 or over.
