= Cannon River (Minnesota) =

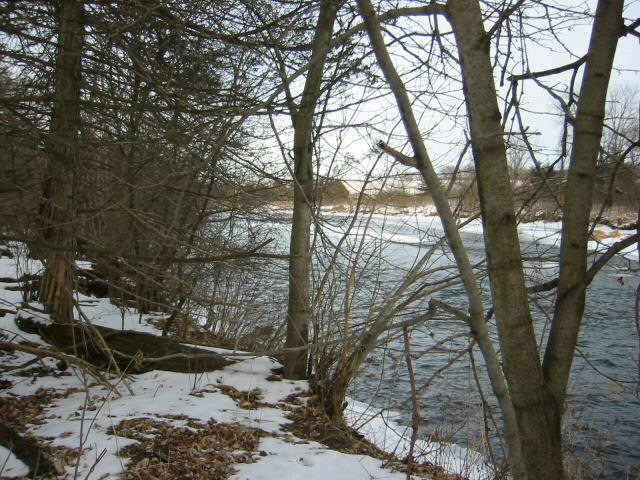
- The Cannon River as seen from a snowshoe trail in Miesville Ravine Park Reserve on a winter day.

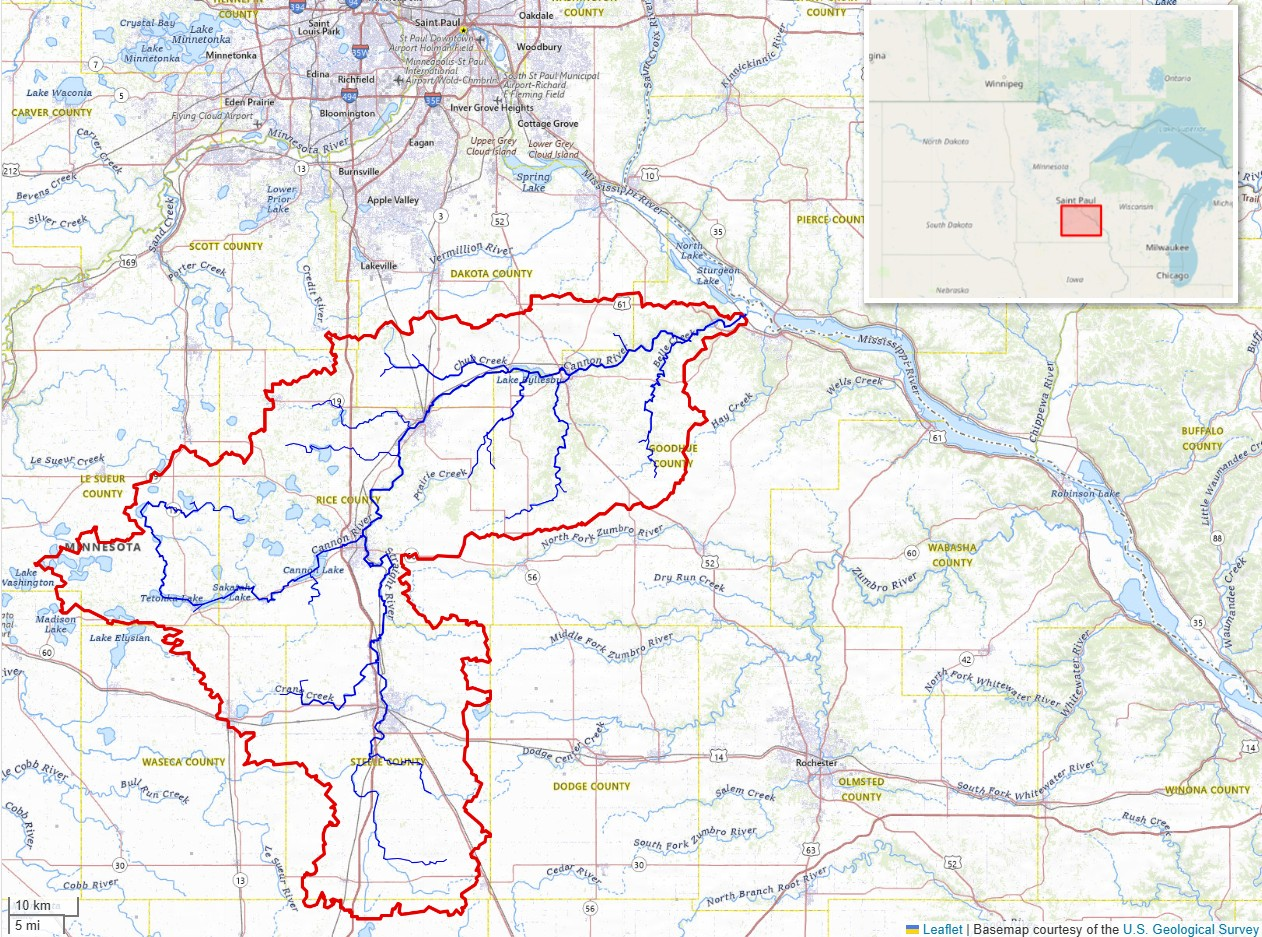
- Cannon River watershed (Interactive map)
- Native name: Iŋ'yaŋ Bosdata (Dakota)

Location
- Country: United States
- State: Minnesota
- Counties: Dakota, Goodhue, Le Sueur, Rice
- Cities: Red Wing, Welch, Cannon Falls, Randolph, Northfield, Dundas, Faribault, Warsaw, Morristown, Waterville

Physical characteristics
- Source: Shields Lake
  - location: Rice County, near Shieldsville, Minnesota, United States
  - coordinates: 44.3688180°N 93.4422624°W
  - elevation: 1,070 ft (330 m)
- Mouth: Mississippi River
  - location: Goodhue County, near Red Wing, Minnesota, United States
  - coordinates: 44.602583°N 92.589771°W
- Length: 112 mi (180 km)
- Basin size: 1,460 sq mi (3,800 km^{2})
- Discharge
  - location: Welch, MN
  - average: 730 cu ft/s (21 m^{3}/s).

Basin features
- Tributaries
  - left: Trout Brook
  - right: Little Cannon River, Straight River, Little Cannon River (Sabre Lake) (near Kilkenny), Belle Creek)

The Cannon River (Dakota: Iŋ'yaŋ Bosdata) is a tributary of the Mississippi River that flows 112 miles (180 km) from Shields Lake near Shieldsville to Red Wing in the U.S. state of Minnesota, where it joins the Mississippi River. It drains a watershed approximately 1460 square miles (3,780 km^{2}) in size. The river flows through the counties of Le Sueur, Rice, Dakota, and Goodhue.

The Cannon River has few rapids, but some can be difficult (Class II). Some have claimed lives, as has the confluence with the Little Cannon River in Cannon Falls. Canoes traversing the river must portage several dams; the low header dams are more dangerous than they appear to novices. Downed trees and logjams are extreme hazards in high water, as are low bridges. The river varies in width from 50 to 200 feet (15 to 60 m).

== Water characteristics ==
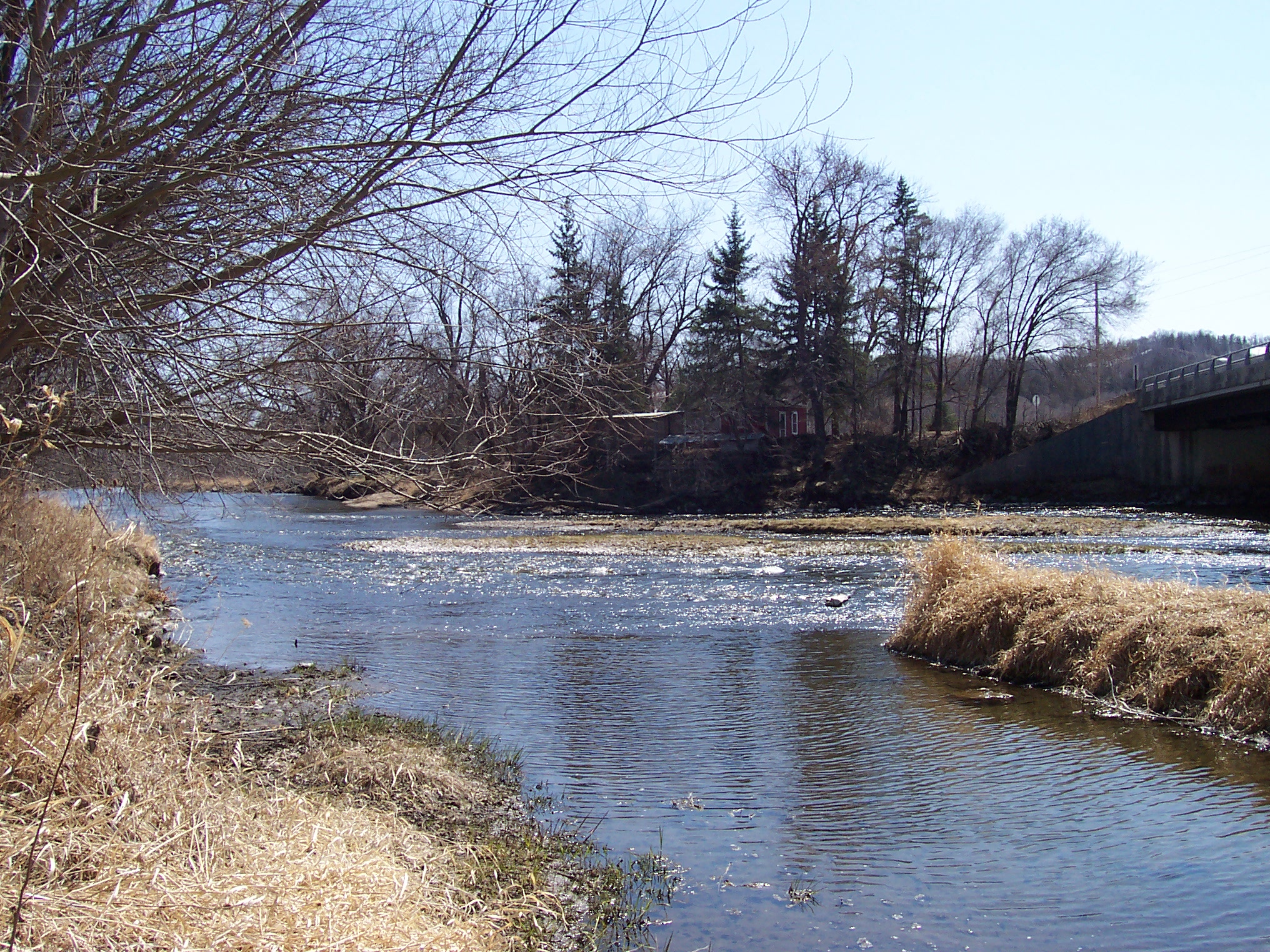
The Cannon River in April at Welch

Stream flow usually peaks in early April. Very heavy rains can cause the river to flood. The dam at Lake Byllesby does not affect water levels and canoeing downstream, because it maintains instantaneous flow-through. From Faribault, Minnesota to its mouth, the Cannon, a designated Minnesota Wild and Scenic River falls 280 feet (85 m), an average of 4.8 feet/mile (1 m/km). In its upper course, the river flows through the lake region of western Rice County. The chief tributary of the Cannon River is the Straight River, which enters the Cannon in Faribault. The Straight River is an important and scenic river in its own right. It originates in southern Steele County at Oak Glen Lake near Bixby.

== Landscape ==
Bounded by rolling hills, bluffs, farmland, and woods in its upper reaches, dammed by H.M. Byllesby in 1910 for hydroelectric power to create Lake Byllesby Reservoir, the Cannon enters a broad gorge below Cannon Falls, where it is flanked by bluffs up to 300 feet (100 m) high. The Cannon River is underlaid with a variety of sedimentary rocks. The river valley was created by cutting through these rocks produced rock outcrops of St. Peter Sandstone, the Prairie du Chien Group of dolomites and sandstone, and near the river's mouth, Jordan Sandstone and the St. Lawrence and Franconia formations.

Past the Falls, the river is in the Driftless Area of Minnesota, a region that remained ice free during the last ice age, allowing the river to carve a very impressive canyon. The upper region of the river is involved with terminal moraines and glacial drift and till, and is not in the Driftless Area.

== Animals and plants ==
In the reservoirs and slow stretches above Faribault the most common game fish are northern pike, black crappies, bluegills, and bullheads. Downstream from Faribault the most common species are smallmouth bass, northern pike, walleye, and, in the stretch below Cannon Falls, Minnesota, channel catfish. Wildlife seen in the river valley includes white-tailed deer, beavers, otters, raccoons, bobcats, red fox, gray fox, and coyotes. Bald eagles are sighted near the Mississippi River.

The Dwarf Trout Lily is a rare plant present only in the Cannon River watershed.

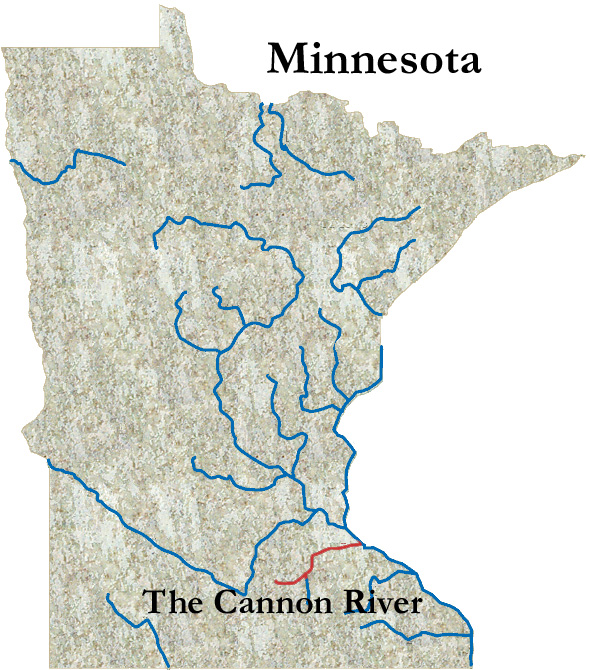
The Cannon River

== Cultural information ==
Evidence of human activity along Iŋ'yaŋ Bosdata (or "Standing Rock River" as the Cannon is named in the Dakota language) goes back at least 12,000 years. By C.E. 1000 the Mississippian culture, a tradition heavily dependent on agriculture, was established in southern Minnesota. An important part of the yearly cycle was the hunting of buffalo west of the Mississippi and the Big Woods. The Cannon served as a primary route from the Mississippi River valley to the plains of western Minnesota where bison were common. The Dakota were forced to surrender the area in the 1851 Treaty of Traverse des Sioux and most Dakota (except for a small group south of Faribault) left the area after the Dakota War of 1862. The "Standing Rock" of the Dakota language name is Castle Rock, located two miles east of the unincorporated community of Castle Rock.

The mouth of the Cannon River was a major center of this culture. In historic times Indians and traders frequently hid their canoes near the river's mouth, and so French fur traders called the stream La Riviere aux Canots, "the river of canoes." The modern name came from a false homophone of French "Canot". In 1877 there were 15 flour mills along the stretch of river between Faribault and Northfield alone. At Dundas, travelers still can see the aging limestone walls of the Archibald Mill. The Cannon River also flows through the Science Center at the Maltby Nature Preserve in Randolph, Minnesota.

Adapted from the Minnesota DNR web site

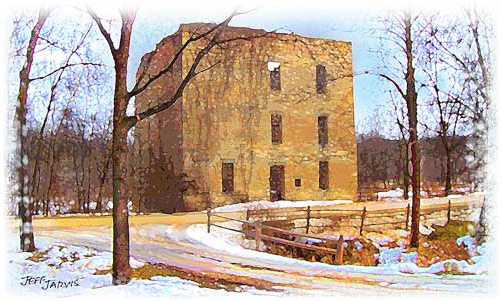
Oxford Mill, Cannon Falls.

== Historic industries ==
Ingenious Cannon Valley flour millers harnessed the power of the Cannon to run their simple country grist mills. In a scant few decades during the mid-to-late 19th Century, more innovations in the flour milling industry were developed here than in several centuries before. Their inventions and processes figuratively changed the face of milling around the world. The first mills they built at Faribault, Morristown, Dundas, Northfield, Cannon Falls and Red Wing became the first bona fide industry that helped grow the Cannon Valley's first economy. These people, John North, John T. Archibald, Alexander Faribault, Edmund LaCroix, and Captain Jesse Ames, to name a few, had much to do with advancing the newer technology, thereby establishing the first towns along the Cannon River. Remnants of the earliest mill companies live on through Malt-O-Meal and in textile milling at the Faribault Woolen Mill.

== Parks and recreation ==
The Cannon Valley Trail runs along the south bank of the river, between Cannon Falls and Red Wing and provides scenic views of surrounding farmland and the river valley. Sakatah Lake State Park is on a natural widening of the river near Waterville. The 40-mile Sakatah-Singing Hills Trail begins at Faribault at the White Sands Trailhead facility, winding its way west along the Cannon River, past several lakes connected by it, ending at Mankato. The four-season asphalt pathway is a remnant of the Cannon Valley Railroad built in the 1880s.

== See also ==
- List of rivers of Minnesota, List of longest streams of Minnesota
- Lake Byllesby
- Sakatah Lake State Park
- Sakatah Singing Hills State Trail, a large portion of the trail follows the Cannon River.
