= List of Minnesota state parks =

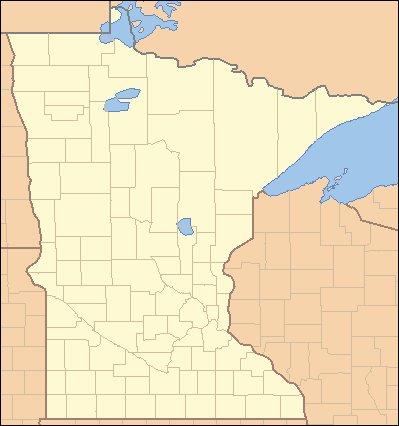
Map of State Parks of Minnesota
Hold cursor over locations to display park name;
click to go to park article.

There are 64 state parks, nine state recreation areas, nine state waysides, and 23 state trails in the Minnesota state park system, totaling approximately 267,000 acres (1,080 km^{2}). A Minnesota state park is an area of land in the U.S. state of Minnesota preserved by the state for its natural, historic, or other resources. Each was created by an act of the Minnesota Legislature and is maintained by the Minnesota Department of Natural Resources. The Minnesota Historical Society operates sites within some of them. The park system began in 1891 with Itasca State Park when a state law was adopted to "maintain intact, forever, a limited quantity of the domain of this commonwealth...in a state of nature." Minnesota's state park system is the second oldest in the United States, after New York's.

Minnesota's state parks are spread across the state in such a way that there is a state park within 50 miles (80 km) of every Minnesotan. The most recent park created is Lake Vermilion State Park, created in 2010. The parks range in size from Franz Jevne State Park with 118 acres (48 ha) to Saint Croix State Park with 34,037 acres (13,774 ha). Two parks include resources listed as National Natural Landmarks (Big Bog State Recreation Area and Itasca State Park) and six parks encompass National Historic Landmarks (Charles A. Lindbergh, Fort Snelling, Mille Lacs Kathio, St. Croix, Soudan Underground Mine, and Split Rock Lighthouse State Parks). 52 sites or districts across 34 Minnesota state parks are on the National Register of Historic Places (NRHP), including 22 parks with developments constructed by New Deal-era job creation programs in the 1930s.

== History ==
Minnesota's first attempt to create a state park came in 1885, when a 173-acre (70 ha) park was authorized to preserve Minnehaha Falls. The effort was delayed by legal appeals from the various landowners of the desired parkland, and by the time those were settled in favor of the state in 1889, Minnesota no longer had the money to purchase the land. Instead the city of Minneapolis fronted the cash. Owned and operated by Minneapolis, Minnehaha State Park was ultimately absorbed as a city park.

Minnesota tried again in 1891, authorizing a state park around Lake Itasca both for its recreational opportunities and to protect the source of the Mississippi River. Interstate Park on the St. Croix River was created in 1895. Other sites were added over the next two decades, but with an inconsistent vision. Modest tracts of scenic land were acquired in Minneopa and Jay Cooke State Parks, but much effort was also expended on creating historical monuments relating to the Dakota War of 1862 and the Great Hinckley Fire. Moreover, most of the sites were being administered by the state auditor, who had many other duties. Itasca State Park, meanwhile, was being administered as a state forest. In 1923, state auditor Ray P. Chase excoriated this situation, calling for wiser selection of park lands and a dedicated commissioner. Chase's comments had an impact, and two years later the Department of Conservation was created to manage the state's natural resources, including the state parks. Originally part of the forestry division, the state parks received their own division in 1935 to take advantage of federal programs such as the Civilian Conservation Corps (CCC). In 1971, the department became the Minnesota Department of Natural Resources.

The state parks were closed for almost three weeks in July 2011 due to a shutdown of the state government.

== State parks and recreation areas ==
Name	County	Size	Estab- lished	River / lake	Coordinates	Image	Remarks							
Name	County	Size	Estab- lished	River / lake	Coordinates	Image	Remarks	Afton State Park	Washington	1,600 acres (650 ha)	1969	St. Croix River	44.8624675°N 92.7835367°W	Lies on a glacial moraine with deep ravines that drop 300 feet (91 m) down to the St. Croix River.
Banning State Park	Pine	5,597 acres (2,265 ha)	1963	Kettle River	46.1707812°N 92.8440889°W		Contains 1.5 miles (2.4 km) of whitewater rapids and the remains of a historic quarry operation.							
Bear Head Lake State Park	St. Louis	3,013 acres (1,219 ha)	1961	Bear Head Lake	47.7963051°N 92.0768231°W		Provides road access and modern camping facilities in an environment similar to the nearby Boundary Waters Canoe Area Wilderness.							
Beaver Creek Valley State Park	Houston	715 acres (289 ha)	1937	East Beaver Creek	43.6427458°N 91.5818101°W		Showcases the rugged topography of the Driftless Area in a narrow valley carved by a trout stream.							
Big Bog State Recreation Area	Beltrami	9,170 acres (3,710 ha)	2000	Red Lake, Tamarac River	48.172761°N 94.512033°W		Encompasses part of the largest peatland in the Lower 48 states (a National Natural Landmark) and a prime walleye fishery.							
Big Stone Lake State Park	Big Stone	980 acres (400 ha)	1961	Big Stone Lake	45.3824644°N 96.5131148°W		Protects two sections of shoreline on Big Stone Lake, the source of the Minnesota River.							
Blue Mounds State Park	Rock	1,567 acres (634 ha)	1937	Mound Creek	43.7069134°N 96.1869728°W		Protects an escarpment of Sioux Quartzite and Minnesota's only public bison herd. A district of WPA structures is on the NRHP.							
Buffalo River State Park	Clay	1,068 acres (432 ha)	1937	Buffalo River	46.8655165°N 96.4678474°W		Preserves part of one of the state's largest and best tallgrass prairies. A district of WPA structures is on the NRHP.							
Camden State Park	Lyon	1,855 acres (751 ha)	1935	Redwood River	44.362462°N 95.9250247°W		Preserves a forested river valley in the midst of prairie and farm country. A district of VCC and WPA structures is on the NRHP.							
Carley State Park	Wabasha	209 acres (85 ha)	1949	Whitewater River	44.1166318°N 92.1760002°W		Donated by State Senator James A. Carley to protect a stand of white pines. Used as an overflow campground for nearby Whitewater State Park.							
Cascade River State Park	Cook	2,867 acres (1,160 ha)	1957	Lake Superior and Cascade River	47.7097222°N 90.5222222°W		Stretches along 10.5 miles (16.9 km) of Lake Superior coastline in land rehabilitated after construction of Minnesota State Highway 61. A WPA highway wayside is on the NRHP.							
Charles A. Lindbergh State Park	Morrison	417 acres (169 ha)	1931	Mississippi River	45.9588545°N 94.3952813°W		Contains the restored home of Congressman Charles August Lindbergh and his son Charles Lindbergh, the famous aviator. The house is a National Historic Landmark, and a district of WPA structures is on the NRHP.							
Crow Wing State Park	Crow Wing, Cass, and Morrison	2,335 acres (945 ha)	1959	Mississippi and Crow Wing Rivers	46.2722222°N 94.3333333°W		Interprets the site of Old Crow Wing, an important town and trading center in the mid-19th century. The town site and a section of the Red River Trails are both on the NRHP.							
Cuyuna Country State Recreation Area	Crow Wing	6,850 acres (2,770 ha)	1993	Chain of small lakes and streams, filled pit mines	46.489550°N 93.977500°W		In development as the land is rehabilitated from open-pit iron mining. Includes Portsmouth Mine Pit Lake, the state's deepest lake.							
Father Hennepin State Park	Mille Lacs	275 acres (111 ha)	1941	Mille Lacs Lake	46.1446779°N 93.4880157°W		Provides lakeside recreation in the region visited by Father Louis Hennepin during a French expedition in 1680.							
Flandrau State Park	Brown	840 acres (340 ha)	1937	Cottonwood River	44.2882956°N 94.4735837°W		Created to provide water recreation near New Ulm. Entire park is a district of CCC and WPA structures on the NRHP.							
Forestville/Mystery Cave State Park	Fillmore	3,163 acres (1,280 ha)	1963	South Branch Root River and tributaries	43.6255204°N 92.247388°W		Encompasses the historic townsite of Forestville, the state's longest explored cave, and three blue-ribbon trout streams.							
Fort Ridgely State Park	Nicollet and Renville	537 acres (217 ha)	1911	Fort Ridgely Creek	44.4524621°N 94.7308199°W		Surrounds Fort Ridgely, site of the Battle of Fort Ridgely during the Dakota War of 1862. The fort and a large district of CCC structures are both on the NRHP.							
Fort Snelling State Park	Ramsey, Hennepin, and Dakota	1,825 acres (739 ha)	1961	Mississippi and Minnesota Rivers	44.8857988°N 93.1779985°W		Contains historic Fort Snelling, built in 1819, and floodplain forest in the heart of Minneapolis – Saint Paul. The fort is a National Historic Landmark and the entire park is part of the Mississippi National River and Recreation Area.							
Franz Jevne State Park	Koochiching	118 acres (48 ha)	1967	Rainy River	48.642240°N 94.080410°W		Features scenic property on the Canada–United States border, donated by the sons of Franz Jevne, a lawyer, on the condition that the park be named after their father.							
Frontenac State Park	Goodhue	2,226 acres (901 ha)	1957	Lake Pepin on Mississippi River	44.5074677°N 92.3262914°W		Attracts 260 species of year-round and migrant birds with its variety of habitats. Includes a natural arch atop a 430-foot (130 m) bluff.							
Garden Island State Recreation Area	Lake of the Woods	715 acres (289 ha)	1998	Lake of the Woods	49.175335°N 94.834671°W		Comprises a nearly undeveloped island, 15 mi (24 km) from the closest mainland marinas, that once bore Native American gardens.							
George H. Crosby Manitou State Park	Lake	6,200 acres (2,500 ha)	1955	Manitou River	47.506018°N 91.109045°W		Contains undeveloped North Woods wilderness geared towards backpackers.							
Glacial Lakes State Park	Pope	1,857 acres (752 ha)	1963	Several kettle lakes	45.537461°N 95.521983°W		Preserves rolling tallgrass prairie amidst the glacial landforms of the Leaf Hills Moraines.							
Glendalough State Park	Otter Tail	1,924 acres (779 ha)	1991	Six kettle lakes	46.3333333°N 95.6666667°W		Developed from the former private retreat and game farm of the owners of the Star Tribune newspaper, with a heritage fishery of large game fish.							
Gooseberry Falls State Park	Lake	1,741 acres (705 ha)	1937	Lake Superior, Gooseberry River	47.1468715°N 91.4632289°W		Serves as the gateway to the scenic North Shore. Features five waterfalls, an agate beach, and a large district of CCC structures on the NRHP.							
Grand Portage State Park	Cook	278 acres (113 ha)	1989	Pigeon River	48.0101633°N 89.6120317°W		Features a 120-foot (37 m) waterfall, Minnesota's tallest, on the Canada–United States border. Co-managed with the Grand Portage Indian Reservation, the only state – tribal collaboration of a U.S. state park.							
Great River Bluffs State Park	Winona	2,122 acres (859 ha)	1963	Mississippi River	43.9463526°N 91.3993094°W		Features 500-foot-high (150 m) bluffs and steep goat prairies. Formerly named O.L. Kipp State Park.							
Greenleaf Lake State Recreation Area	Meeker	1,230 acres (500 ha)	2004	Greenleaf and Sioux Lakes	45.01591°N 94.46671°W		In development and open for limited day-use recreation.							
Hayes Lake State Park	Roseau	2,118 acres (857 ha)	1967	Hayes Lake, North Fork Roseau River	48.623309°N 95.507753°W		Provides fishing and swimming opportunities in an exclusively recreational reservoir free of agricultural runoff or water level fluctuations for irrigation or power generation.							
Interstate State Park	Chisago	288 acres (117 ha)	1895	St. Croix River	45.3949622°N 92.6696521°W		Created in conjunction with a state park in Wisconsin to protect a basalt gorge and glacial potholes. Two districts of CCC and WPA structures are on the NRHP.							
Iron Range Off-Highway Vehicle State Recreation Area	St. Louis	1,864 acres (754 ha)	2002	Lake Ore-be-gone	47.48247°N 92.44349°W		Provides 36 miles (58 km) of trails for off highway vehicles.							
Itasca State Park	Hubbard, Clearwater, and Becker	30,553 acres (12,364 ha)	1891	Lake Itasca	47.1974579°N 95.2019642°W		Minnesota's oldest state park, which preserves the headwaters of the Mississippi River. The entire park and an individual archaeological site are on the NRHP, and a subsection is a National Natural Landmark.							
Jay Cooke State Park	Carlton	8,125 acres (3,288 ha)	1915	Saint Louis River	46.6496646°N 92.330748°W		Showcases a rocky, whitewater-strewn river churning through the North Woods. Three districts of CCC and WPA structures and a long-used portage route are on the NRHP.							
John A. Latsch State Park	Winona	409 acres (166 ha)	1925	Mississippi River	44.1619082°N 91.8220997°W		Features three steep river bluffs.							
Judge C. R. Magney State Park	Cook	4,323 acres (1,749 ha)	1957	Lake Superior, Brule River	47.8512799°N 90.0584299°W		Contains the Devil's Kettle, a large glacial kettle into which half of the Brule River disappears.							
Kilen Woods State Park	Jackson	202 acres (82 ha)	1945	Des Moines River	43.7266244°N 95.0630473°W		Preserves a riverside parcel of forested hills on the Coteau des Prairies.							
La Salle Lake State Recreation Area	Hubbard	1,000 acres (400 ha)	2011	Mississippi River, La Salle Lake	47.33719°N 95.17061°W		In development around the second-deepest lake in Minnesota.							
Lac qui Parle State Park	Lac qui Parle and Chippewa	897 acres (363 ha)	1959	Lac qui Parle, Minnesota and Lac qui Parle Rivers	45.0205141°N 95.888921°W		Attracts thousands of migrating waterfowl, earning it the name "Lake that Speaks." A district of WPA buildings is on the NRHP.							
Lake Bemidji State Park	Beltrami	1,653 acres (669 ha)	1923	Lake Bemidji	47.5363413°N 94.8227704°W		Features a recreational lakeshore and a spruce-tamarack bog. A district of CCC and National Youth Administration structures is on the NRHP.							
Lake Bronson State Park	Kittson	2,806 acres (1,136 ha)	1937	Lake Bronson, South Branch Two Rivers	48.7247004°N 96.6033741°W		Features a reservoir created during a drought in the 1930s. A district of WPA structures is on the NRHP.							
Lake Carlos State Park	Douglas	1,175 acres (476 ha)	1937	Lake Carlos	45.9866293°N 95.3278143°W		Preserves diverse habitats from prairie to hardwood forest to tamarack bog in a transition zone. Two districts of WPA structures are on the NRHP.							
Lake Louise State Park	Mower	849 acres (344 ha)	1963	Lake Louise, Upper and Little Iowa Rivers	43.5335762°N 92.5254538°W		Features a reservoir surrounded by oak savanna and patches of hardwood forest. Minnesota's oldest continuous recreation area, formerly a town park since the 1860s.							
Lake Maria State Park	Wright	1,475 acres (597 ha)	1963	Several kettle lakes	45.3138543°N 93.9572003°W		Provides a lightly developed wilderness area near Minneapolis – Saint Paul in a morainal landscape of Big Woods.							
Lake Shetek State Park	Murray County	1,109 acres (449 ha)	1937	Lake Shetek	44.1021838°N 95.6900114°W		Features remnants of pioneer history around the largest lake in southwestern Minnesota. Two districts of WPA structures are on the NRHP.							
Lake Vermilion Soudan Underground Mine State Park	St. Louis	2,875 acres (1,163 ha)	2010	Lake Vermilion	47.83471°N 92.19812°W		Recently purchased and in development on the fifth-largest lake in Minnesota.							
Maplewood State Park	Otter Tail	8,127 acres (3,289 ha)	1963	Several kettle lakes	46.5335703°N 95.9492193°W		Preserves a forest/prairie transition zone in the Leaf Hills Moraines. A Native American archaeological site is on the NRHP.							
McCarthy Beach State Park	St. Louis	1,908 acres (772 ha)	1945	Sturgeon and Side Lakes	47.6727068°N 93.0301834°W		Features a .5-mile-long (0.80 km) beach on an isthmus between two lakes.							
Mille Lacs Kathio State Park	Mille Lacs	9,786 acres (3,960 ha)	1957	Mille Lacs Lake, Rum River	46.1288485°N 93.7405269°W		Preserves 19 identified archaeological sites dating back 9000 years. The entire park is a National Historic Landmark and four sites are individually listed on the NRHP.							
Minneopa State Park	Blue Earth	1,617 acres (654 ha)	1905	Minnesota River, Minneopa Creek	44.1621879°N 94.1021803°W		Showcases the largest waterfall in southern Minnesota. The 1864 Seppman Mill and a district of WPA structures are each on the NRHP.							
Minnesota Valley State Recreation Area	Hennepin, Dakota, Scott, Carver, Sibley, and Le Sueur	6,442 acres (2,607 ha)	1969	Minnesota River	44.661999°N 93.703337°W		Comprises non-contiguous sections interspersed with units of the Minnesota Valley National Wildlife Refuge in the valley formed by Glacial River Warren.							
Monson Lake State Park	Swift	343 acres (139 ha)	1937	Monson and West Sunberg Lakes	45.3205175°N 95.2750235°W		Established as a memorial to settlers who died in the Dakota War of 1862. A district of CCC and WPA structures is on the NRHP.							
Moose Lake State Park	Carlton	829 acres (335 ha)	1971	Moosehead and Echo Lakes	46.436319°N 92.72521°W		Provides water recreation and an exhibit hall on Lake Superior agates (the state gemstone) and the geology of Minnesota.							
Myre-Big Island State Park	Freeborn	1,578 acres (639 ha)	1947	Albert Lea Lake	43.6238465°N 93.2890959°W		Features two islands with old growth hardwood forest since they were out of reach of prairie fires. Also houses one of the state's largest research collections of Native American artifacts.							
Nerstrand-Big Woods State Park	Rice	1,646 acres (666 ha)	1945	Prairie Creek	44.3452425°N 93.1074337°W		Preserves a remnant stand of Big Woods.							
Old Mill State Park	Marshall	287 acres (116 ha)	1951	Middle River	48.361364°N 96.5703288°W		Features two mills and a log cabin from the late 19th Century. The Larson Mill and a district of WPA structures are each on the NRHP.							
Red River State Recreation Area	Polk	104 acres (42 ha)	1997	Red River of the North and Red Lake River	47.9327778°N 97.0355556°W		Reclaims land devastated by the 1997 Red River flood as part of the Greater Grand Forks Greenway, which serves the dual purpose of holding back river waters during floods and providing recreational opportunities.							
Rice Lake State Park	Steele and Dodge	712 acres (288 ha)	1963	Rice Lake	44.0874639°N 93.061315°W		Surrounds a shallow lake which attracts migrating waterfowl.							
St. Croix Islands State Recreation Area	Washington	25 acres (10 ha)	1935	St. Croix River	45.08524°N 92.78608°W		Comprises five islands near the St. Croix Boom Site that came under state control but were never developed. Leased to the Saint Croix National Scenic Riverway.							
St. Croix State Park	Pine	31,775 acres (12,859 ha)	1943	St. Croix River	45.9741154°N 92.5835304°W		Developed as a Recreational Demonstration Area by the CCC and the WPA to repurpose land too poor to farm. The entire park is a National Historic Landmark.							
Sakatah Lake State Park	Le Sueur and Rice	810 acres (330 ha)	1963	Sakatah Lake on the Cannon River	44.2210746°N 93.5357792°W		Features a transitional zone between prairie and Big Woods on a natural widening of the Cannon River.							
Savanna Portage State Park	Aitkin and St. Louis	15,277 acres (6,182 ha)	1961	East and West Savanna Rivers, numerous kettle lakes	46.8374455°N 93.1566054°W		Preserves a historically important and legendarily difficult 6-mile (9.7 km) portage over a continental divide between the watersheds of the Mississippi River and Lake Superior. The portage is on the NRHP.							
Scenic State Park	Itasca	2,370 acres (960 ha)	1921	Sandwick and Coon Lakes	47.7157733°N 93.5629701°W		Features pristine lakes and old-growth pines. Two districts of structures built by the first CCC state park camp in Minnesota are on the NRHP.							
Schoolcraft State Park	Cass and Itasca	141 acres (57 ha)	1959	Mississippi River	47.2249502°N 93.7999449°W		Honors Henry Schoolcraft, who charted the origins of the Mississippi River with the Ojibwe guide Ozawindib. Preserves virgin pine forest that includes a white pine over 300 years old.							
Sibley State Park	Kandiyohi	2,540 acres (1,030 ha)	1919	Lake Andrew and other kettle lakes	45.3196867°N 95.0230696°W		Honors Henry Hastings Sibley, the first governor of Minnesota, with a popular recreational lakeshore and a morainal landscape. A district of CCC structures is on the NRHP.							
Split Rock Creek State Park	Pipestone	947 acres (383 ha)	1937	Split Rock Lake	43.8980264°N 96.3642032°W		Features a recreational reservoir on the Coteau des Prairies.							
Split Rock Lighthouse State Park	Lake	2,112 acres (855 ha)	1945	Lake Superior, Split Rock River	47.1921472°N 91.3929484°W		Surrounds the clifftop Split Rock Lighthouse, one of the most photographed lighthouses in the United States. The lighthouse is a National Historic Landmark.							
Temperance River State Park	Cook	1,134 acres (459 ha)	1957	Lake Superior, Temperance and Cross Rivers	47.5543466°N 90.8723722°W		Showcases the deep, narrow gorge of the Temperance River (so named for its lack of a "bar" at its mouth) and Carlton Peak, a rock climbing area.							
Tettegouche State Park	Lake	8,998 acres (3,641 ha)	1979	Lake Superior and Baptism River	47.358806°N 91.2640506°W		Encompasses the tallest waterfall within the state's borders, the iconic headlands of Palisade Head and Shovel Point, and a historic fishing camp which is on the NRHP.							
Whitewater State Park	Winona	1,672 acres (677 ha)	1919	Whitewater River	44.058297°N 92.0587726°W		Showcases a popular steep-sided river valley in the Driftless Area. A large district of CCC and WPA structures is on the NRHP.							
Wild River State Park	Chisago	6,574 acres (2,660 ha)	1973	St. Croix River	45.5680159°N 92.8757696°W		Follows 18 miles (29 km) of one of the first waterways designated a National Wild and Scenic River. A section of the Point Douglas to Superior Military Road is on the NRHP.							
William O'Brien State Park	Washington	1,783 acres (722 ha)	1947	St. Croix River	45.2194109°N 92.7660423°W		Provides outdoor recreation opportunities near Minneapolis – Saint Paul.							
Zippel Bay State Park	Lake of the Woods	2,826 acres (1,144 ha)	1959	Lake of the Woods	48.8638742°N 94.8593862°W		Provides water recreation and birdwatching opportunities on the shore of the country's sixth largest lake.							

== State waysides ==
The state park system includes nine waysides, most of them along Minnesota State Highway 61 on the North Shore. These are parcels of land too small to be full-fledged parks, but with cultural or natural resources greater than would be overseen by the Minnesota Department of Transportation as highway waysides. Generally development is limited to a parking area and a short trail; sometimes there are sanitation facilities and picnic tables as well.

Name	County	Established	Coordinates	Image	Remarks
Caribou Falls State Wayside	Lake	1947	47.46452°N 91.03084°W		Includes a waterfall on the Caribou River. Formerly Caribou Falls State Park.
Devils Track Falls State Wayside	Cook	1961	47.77804°N 90.28273°W		A nearly inaccessible gorge on the Devil Track River within Superior National Forest. Formerly Devils Track Falls State Park.
Flood Bay State Wayside	Lake	1965	47.03850°N 91.64254°W		A rocky Lake Superior beach just outside Two Harbors.
Inspiration Peak State Wayside	Otter Tail	1931	46.13714°N 95.57809°W		The highest point of the Leaf Hills Moraines.
Joseph R. Brown State Wayside	Renville	1937	44.750328°N 95.324425°W		The ruins of Joseph R. Brown's three-story mansion, destroyed during the Dakota War of 1862. The ruins are on the NRHP.
Kadunce River State Wayside	Cook	1947	47.79393°N 90.15414°W		Lake Superior shoreline around the mouth of the variably spelled Kadunce River. Formerly Kodonce River State Park.
Ray Berglund State Wayside	Cook	1951	47.60894°N 90.76943°W		A memorial at the mouth of the Onion River to a St. Paul businessman and conservationist, on land donated by his friends.
St. Croix Boom Site State Wayside	Washington	2016	45.08386°N 92.78731°W		Commemorates the site of a log boom where timber was sorted. Became a state wayside in 2016 following a facelift of facilities formerly owned by the Minnesota Department of Transportation.
Sam Brown Memorial State Wayside	Traverse	1929	45.59616°N 96.84141°W		Created to honor Joseph R. Brown's son Samuel J. Brown, "the Paul Revere of the West," who rode 120 miles (190 km) through a storm on April 19, 1866, to warn of an expected Dakota attack. Formerly Sam Brown State Park.

== State trails ==
Trail name	Trailheads	Length in miles	Length in kilometers	Surface	Remarks
Arrowhead State Trail	Tower – International Falls	135	217	Unpaved	Serves primarily as a winter snowmobile route, branching off the Taconite State Trail.
Blazing Star State Trail	Albert Lea – Myre-Big Island State Park	6	9.7	Paved	Planned to continue to Austin and connect with the Shooting Star State Trail.
Blufflands State Trail: Harmony-Preston Valley Segment	Harmony – Preston	18	29	Paved	Climbs out of the Root River Valley.
Blufflands State Trail: Root River Segment	Fountain – Houston	42	68	Paved	Extends along the Root River.
Casey Jones State Trail	Pipestone – Murray County, Lake Shetek State Park – Currie	19	31	Partly paved	Invokes legendary train engineer Casey Jones in three unconnected segments that reflect railroad and pioneer history.
Central Lakes State Trail	Osakis – Fergus Falls	55	89	Paved	Skirts a series of glacially formed lakes in Central Minnesota and connects to the Lake Wobegon Trails.
Cuyuna Lakes State Trail	Cuyuna Country State Recreation Area	6	9.7	Paved	Wends through a regenerating open-pit mining area and connects with several mountain biking trails.
Douglas State Trail	Pine Island – Rochester	13	21	Parallel paved and unpaved	Stretches through the rural scenery of a rich agricultural region.
Gateway State Trail	St. Paul – Pine Point Regional Park	18	29	Paved with 10 miles (16 km) of parallel unpaved	Extends from an urban setting to a rural park near Stillwater.
Gitchi-Gami State Trail	Gooseberry Falls State Park – Beaver Bay, Schroeder – Tofte	25	40	Paved	Runs along the shore of Lake Superior in multiple unconnected segments. Planned to run continuously from Two Harbors to Grand Marais.
Glacial Lakes State Trail	Hawick – Willmar	22	35	Parallel paved and unpaved	Traverses gently rolling glacial landforms.
Goodhue Pioneer State Trail	Red Wing – Hay Creek Township, Zumbrota	10	16	Paved with some parallel unpaved	Exists in two sections, but planned to run from Red Wing to Pine Island.
Great River Ridge State Trail	Plainview – Eyota	13	21	Paved with some parallel unpaved	Wends past the river bluffs of the Driftless Area.
Heartland State Trail	Park Rapids – Cass Lake	49	79	Paved with some parallel unpaved	Passes through mixed northern forests, intersecting with the Paul Bunyan State Trail.
Luce Line State Trail	Plymouth – Cosmos	63	101	Partly paved with some parallel unpaved	Stretches from the Minneapolis suburbs out to a rural landscape.
Mill Towns State Trail	Northfield – Dundas	3	4.8	Paved	Planned to connect the Sakatah Singing Hills State Trail in Faribault to the Cannon Valley Trail in Cannon Falls
Minnesota Valley State Trail	Shakopee – Belle Plaine	42	68	Mostly unpaved	Follows the Minnesota River.
North Shore State Trail	Duluth – Grand Marais	146	235	Unpaved	Traverses the inland backcountry of the North Shore, primarily as a winter snowmobile route.
Paul Bunyan State Trail	Brainerd – Lake Bemidji State Park	112	180	Paved	Comprises one of the country's longest continuously paved trails, with a planned extension to Crow Wing State Park. Intersects with the Heartland State Trail.
Sakatah Singing Hills State Trail	Faribault – Mankato	39	63	Paved with some parallel unpaved	Follows the Cannon River and passes through Sakatah Lake State Park.
Shooting Star State Trail	LeRoy – Adams	14	23	Paved	Crosses open country and passes through Lake Louise State Park.
Taconite State Trail	Grand Rapids – Ely	155	249	Mostly unpaved	Serves primarily as a winter snowmobile route, intersecting with the Arrowhead State Trail.
Willard Munger State Trail	Hinckley – Duluth, Wrenshall – Carlton, Chengwatana State Forest – Holyoke	76	122	Paved	Honors state legislator and trail advocate Willard Munger with a trail system of three segments.

=== Future trails ===
Since Minnesota state parks and trails are authorized by the state legislature, some trails have been established in state statute, yet no usable mileage has been constructed.

Trail name	South/West terminus	North/East terminus	Remarks
Camp Ripley/Veterans State Trail	Little Falls	Crow Wing State Park	A segment is planned to split to the west of Camp Ripley and serve Pillager. Planned to connect the Soo Line Off-Highway Vehicle Trail with the Paul Bunyan State Trail.
Des Moines River Valley State Trail	Iowa border in Jackson County	Casey Jones State Trail in Murray County	Planned to connect with the Iowa Great Lakes regional trail in Mini-Wakan State Park. Also planned to go through Kilen Woods State Park.
Minnesota River State Trail	Big Stone Lake State Park	Le Sueur	Planned to connect with the Minnesota Valley State Trail in Le Sueur.
Mississippi Blufflands State Trail	Lake City	Red Wing	To connect with the Cannon Valley Trail and the Rattlesnake Bluff Trail.
Prairie Wildflower State Trail	Austin	Faribault	To follow an abandoned railroad grade.
Stagecoach State Trail	Owatonna	Rochester	To pass through Rice Lake State Park on the historic Stagecoach Trail.
Superior Vista State Trail	Duluth	Two Harbors	To follow the Lake Superior shoreline via abandoned railroad grades.

== Former parks ==
Several units added to the Minnesota state park system over the years have since been redesignated or transferred to other agencies, including the system's very first unit, Camp Release State Memorial Wayside, created in 1889. In most cases these decisions were due to the unit being too small for a state park with little chance of expansion, or largely local use rather than attracting visitors from all over the state and beyond. Four of these units were redesignated as state waysides and are listed above. The other former units were:

Former name	Date established	Date redesignated	Result	Image
Alexander Ramsey State Park	1911	1957	Transferred to Redwood Falls as a city park.	
Birch Cooley Battle Field State Memorial Park	1929	1976	Transferred to Minnesota Historical Society.	
Camp Release State Memorial Wayside	1889	1975	Redesignated Camp Release State Monument.	
Hill-Annex Mine State Park	1931	2024	Mining Operations resumed	
Horace Austin State Park	1913	1949	Transferred to Austin as a city park.	
Garvin Heights State Park	1922	1961	Transferred to Winona as a city park.	
Kaplan Woods State Park	1935	1963	Part demolished to build a highway, remainder transferred to Owatonna as a city park.	
Lac qui Parle Mission Chippewa Mission State Memorial Wayside	1931	1973	Transferred to Minnesota Historical Society.	
Little Elbow Lake State Park	1963	1989	Transferred to White Earth Indian Reservation.	
Old Crossing Treaty Historic Wayside	1931	1987	Parts transferred to Red Lake County and University of Minnesota Crookston, remainder added to Huot Wildlife Management Area.	
Oronoco Park (later Oronoco State Scenic Reserve)	1937	1965	Transferred to Olmsted County.	
Pine Tree State Park	1947	1965	Transferred to Blackduck as a city park.	
Pomme de Terre Recreational Reserve	1937	1965	Transferred to Morris as a city park.	
Sleepy Eye State Park	1921	1965	Transferred to Sleepy Eye as a city park.	
Toqua Lakes State Park	1921	1965	Transferred to Big Stone County as a county park.	
Traverse des Sioux State Park	1905	1981	Transferred to Minnesota Historical Society and city of St. Peter.	
Upper Sioux Agency State Park	1963	2024	Transferred to Upper Sioux Community.	
Watson State Wayside	1941	1959	Transferred to Watson as a city park.	

== See also ==
- List of hiking trails in Minnesota
- List of Minnesota state forests
- List of U.S. national parks
