= Hay Creek, Minnesota =

Unincorporated community in Minnesota, United States

Hay Creek
- Unincorporated community
- Location within Minnesota Location within the United States
- Coordinates: 44°29′31″N 92°32′38″W
- Country: United States
- State: Minnesota
- County: Goodhue
- Township: Hay Creek
- Elevation: 833 ft (254 m)
- Time zone: UTC-6 (Central (CST))
  - Summer (DST): UTC-5 (CDT)
- ZIP code: 55066
- Area code: 651
- GNIS feature ID: 644751

Hay Creek is an unincorporated community in Hay Creek Township, Goodhue County, Minnesota, United States.

The community is located at the junction of State Highway 58 (MN 58), Hay Creek Trail, and 315th Street.

Hay Creek flows through the community. Nearby places include Red Wing, Goodhue, Belvidere Mills, Frontenac, and Lake City.

Hay Creek was once a station on the Chicago Great Western Railway between Red Wing and Rochester, Minnesota. The abandoned railroad right-of-way is being developed as the Goodhue Pioneer State Trail.
