= Richard J. Dorer Memorial Hardwood State Forest =

Forest in Minnesota, United States

- Location within Minnesota

Geography
- Location: Dakota, Goodhue, Wabasha, Winona, Olmsted, Houston, and Fillmore counties, Minnesota, United States
- Coordinates: 44°11′07″N 92°04′48″W
- Area: 1,016,204 acres (411,243 ha)

Administration
- Established: 1961
- Authority: Minnesota Department of Natural Resources, Private
- Website: www.dnr.state.mn.us/state_forests/forest.html?id=sft00033#homepage

Ecology
- WWF Classification: Upper Midwest forest-savanna transition
- EPA Classification: Driftless Area

The Richard J. Dorer Memorial Hardwood State Forest is a 1,016,204 acres (4,112.43 km^{2}) reserve of current and former forest in Minnesota's Driftless Area. Only 45,000 acres (180 km^{2}) of the land is state owned, with the remainder owned by private individuals and community groups, governed by easements. Non-contiguous units are spread over seven counties ( Dakota, Fillmore, Goodhue, Olmsted, Houston, Wabasha, and Winona Counties), generally in areas just west of the Mississippi River, but extending much further west into the valleys of the Root and Zumbro Rivers.

A wide variety of recreational activities are offered: camping, fishing, horseback riding trails (including horse picket lines and corrals); an extensive network of hiking and nature trails (including a wheelchair-accessible trail), and off-highway vehicle trails.

It is named in honor of a former Commissioner of Conservation.

== See also ==
- List of Minnesota state forests
- Great River Bluffs State Park
- John A. Latsch State Park
- Beaver Creek Valley State Park
- Carley State Park
- Frontenac State Park
- Whitewater State Park

== Sources ==
- "Richard J. Dorer Memorial Hardwood", Minnesota Department of Natural Resources, Retrieved July 15, 2007
- "The Richard J. Dorer Memorial Hardwood State Forest" Retrieved July 15, 2007
