= Goodhue Pioneer State Trail =

Rail trail in Minnesota, United States

Coordinates: 44°21′19″N 92°40′24″W

- Length: 10 mi (16 km)
- Location: Southeast Minnesota, United States
- Designation: Minnesota state trail
- Trailheads: Red Wing; Hay Creek Township; Zumbrota
- Use: Biking, hiking, in-line skating, cross-country skiing, snowmobiling, horseback riding
- Season: Year-round
- Sights: Richard J. Dorer Memorial Hardwood State Forest: Hay Creek Unit, North Fork Zumbro River, Zumbrota Covered Bridge
- Hazards: Severe weather
- Surface: Asphalt, adjacent dirt for partial length
- Website: Goodhue Pioneer State Trail

The Goodhue Pioneer State Trail is a multi-use recreational rail trail in southeastern Minnesota, United States. The 10 miles (16 km) of trail currently exist in two segments, separated by a six-mile (10 km) gap. The four-mile (6 km) northern segment is a paved trail running from Red Wing, Minnesota, to the Hay Creek section of the Richard J. Dorer Memorial Hardwood State Forest near Hay Creek Township, with an adjacent natural surface trail for horseback riding through the Hay Creek portion. The 5.5-mile (8.9 km) southern section is a paved trail running northward from the Zumbrota Covered Bridge Park in Zumbrota, Minnesota. The trail corridor follows an abandoned Chicago Great Western Railway segment that was originally built by the Duluth, Red Wing, & Southern Railroad in 1888, and abandoned in 1964 following a derailment.

The trail connects to the Cannon Valley Trail in Red Wing.
