= Great River Ridge State Trail =

Coordinates: 44°6′10″N 92°16′26″W

- Length: 13 mi (21 km)
- Location: Southeast Minnesota, U.S.
- Designation: Minnesota state trail
- Trailheads: Plainview; Eyota
- Use: Biking, hiking, horseback riding, in-line skating, snowmobiling
- Grade: Mostly level
- Difficulty: Easy
- Season: Year-round
- Sights: Driftless Area topography, North Branch Whitewater River
- Hazards: Severe weather
- Surface: Asphalt, partial natural
- Website: Great River Ridge State Trail

The Great River Ridge State Trail is a multi-use recreational rail trail in southeastern Minnesota, United States. It is planned to run 15 miles (24 km) from the city of Plainview through Elgin to Eyota on the former right-of-way of a branch line of the Chicago and North Western Railway. Currently the final two miles (3.2 km) leading into Eyota are incomplete, but the rest of the route is paved and, south of Elgin, includes a parallel unpaved trackway for horseback riders and snowmobiles. An extension providing access to Carley State Park is also planned.
