= Shooting Star State Trail =

Coordinates: 43°33′27″N 92°39′0″W

- Length: 30 mi (48 km)
- Location: Southeast Minnesota, USA
- Designation: Minnesota state trail
- Trailheads: LeRoy and Austin, Minnesota
- Use: Biking, hiking, in-line skating
- Sights: Lake Louise State Park, wildflowers
- Hazards: Severe weather
- Surface: Asphalt
- Website: Shooting Star State Trail

The Shooting Star State Trail is a multi-use recreational trail in southeastern Minnesota, USA. It runs 30 miles (48 km) between the towns of LeRoy and Austin, where it intersects with an expanded Blazing Star State Trail to Lyle.

The route largely follows a leg of Minnesota State Highway 56, which was designated the Shooting Star Wildflower and Historic Route Scenic Byway. Both trail and byway are named for the shooting star, a wildflower. The trail was built on the roadbed of the former Milwaukee Road.
