= Camp Release State Monument =

- U.S. National Register of Historic Places
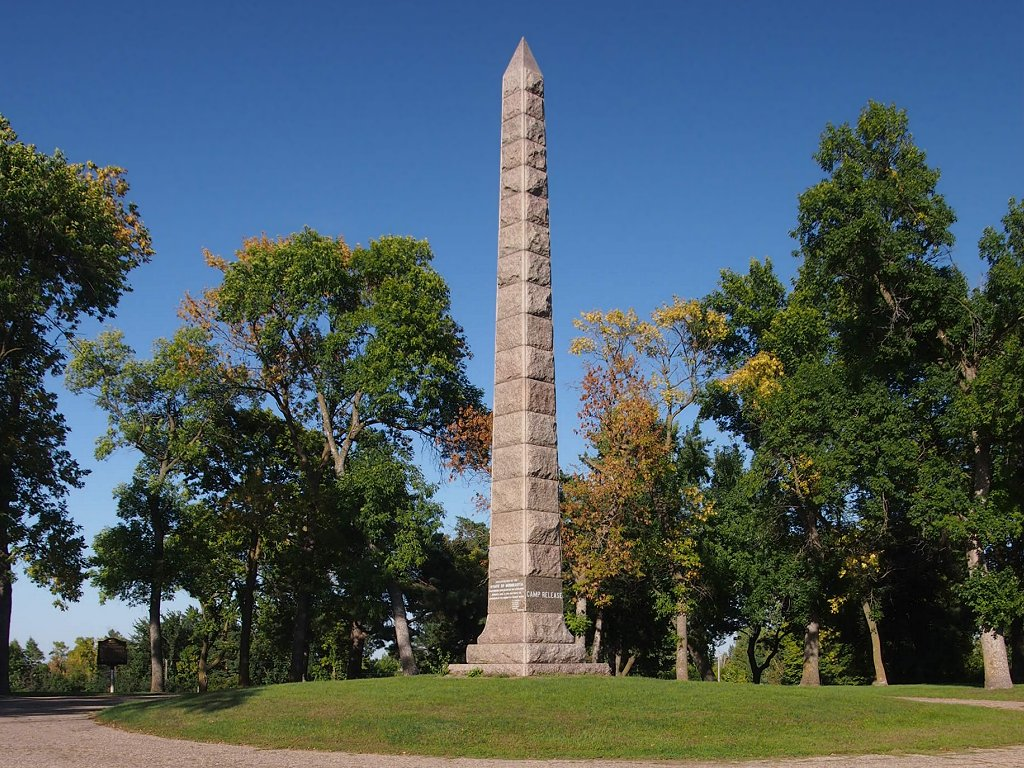
- Camp Release State Monument

- Location within Minnesota Location within the United States
- Nearest city: Montevideo, Minnesota
- Coordinates: 44.93319°N 95.747928°W
- Built: 1894
- NRHP reference No.: 73000981
- Added to NRHP: March 14, 1973

Camp Release State Monument is located on the edge of Montevideo, Minnesota, United States, just off Highway 212 in Lac qui Parle County, in the 6-acre Camp Release State Memorial Wayside. The Camp Release Monument stands as a reminder of Minnesota's early state history. The Minnesota River Valley and Montevideo were important sites in the Dakota War of 1862.

On September 26. 1862, a few days after the U.S. victory at the Battle of Wood Lake, 269 prisoners who had been taken captive during the conflict were released to Colonel Henry Hastings Sibley at a spot that became known as Camp Release, which was located on a bluff overlooking the valley and the present-day site of Montevideo.

The Camp Release State Monument was the sixth of 23 state monuments erected by the Minnesota legislature between 1873 and 1929. It was the first property added to the state park system and was listed on the National Register of Historic Places in 1973.

== Monument dedication and inscription ==
The Camp Release Monument was dedicated on July 4, 1894, commemorating "the surrender here of a large body of Indians, and the release of 269 captives, most of them women and children" on September 26, 1862.

The inscription on the northern side of the monument states that the release was "The result mainly of the signal victory over the hostile Sioux at Wood Lake by Minnesota troops under command of General Henry H. Sibley, all being incidents of the Great Sioux Indian Massacre."

The southern side of the monument simply says "Camp Release".

The other two sides of the 51-foot granite monument are inscribed with information about:

- The dates of battles that took place along the Minnesota River during the conflict (Eastern side)
- Erection of the monument by the State of Minnesota in accordance with an act of Legislature approved on April 11, 1893, and supervised by named committee members (Western side)

== Monument marker ==
Erected in 1894 by the Minnesota Historical Society, the Camp Release Marker states that on September 26, 1862, "91 whites and about 150 mixed-blood captives, some of who had been captives of the Dakota Indians for over a month" were released.

It goes on to state, "In the next few days, additional captives were freed, bringing the total to 107 whites and 162 mixed-bloods – 269 in all."

The marker also goes on to acknowledge the role played by the Dakota "peace faction":

Many Dakota who had not supported the war took great risks to help keep the captives alive. By late September, Dakota peace factions led by Wabasha, Taopi, Red Iron, Mazomani, Standing Buffalo, and others were camped only half a mile from the war faction near the mouth of the Chippewa River. While Little Crow's men were fighting the battle of Wood Lake, the peace supporters took control of the captives, expecting to have to fight the returning war party if it were victorious against Sibley's army. But Little Crow's men did not win at Wood Lake. The war leaders and many of their followers fled Minnesota, and the Dakota peace group sent a message to Sibley to arrange the prisoner release three days later.

The Camp Release Marker concludes by explaining that the Dakota who "surrendered" included members of the peace faction:

Many of the peace faction who surrendered to Sibley's army at Camp Release were among the Dakota exiled from Minnesota the following year.

The Minnesota Historical Society has since revised the estimated total of captives released at Camp Release to 285.

== See also ==
- National Register of Historic Places listings in Lac qui Parle County, Minnesota
