= Sam Brown Memorial State Wayside =

- Fort Wadsworth Agency and Scout Headquarters Building
- U.S. National Register of Historic Places
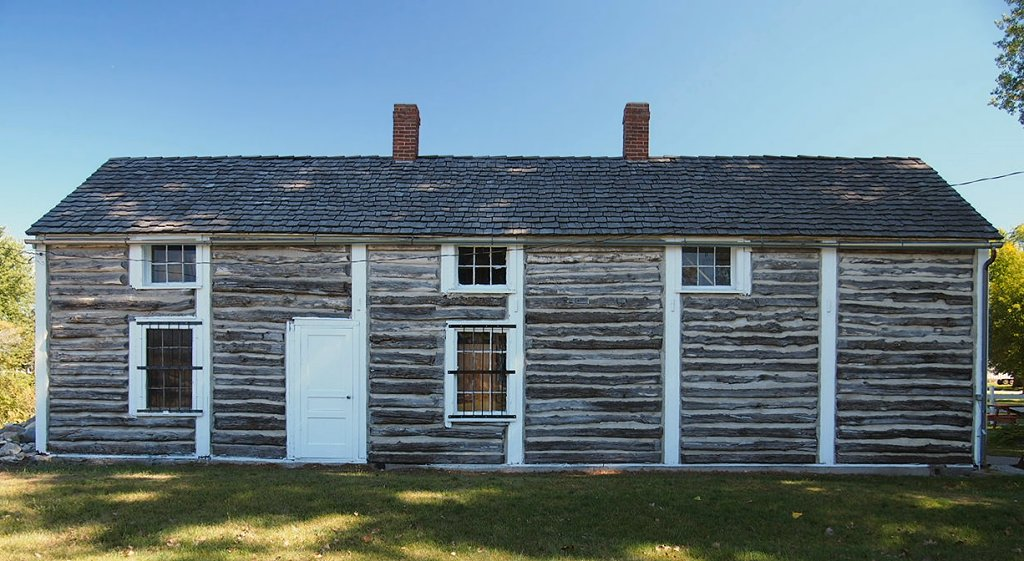
- The Fort Wadsworth Agency and Scout Headquarters Building from the west

- Location within Minnesota Location within the United States
- Location: 796 W. Broadway Avenue, Browns Valley, Minnesota
- Coordinates: 45°35′45″N 96°50′27″W
- Area: 1 acre (0.40 ha)
- Built: 1864
- NRHP reference No.: 86001672
- Designated: July 17, 1986

Sam Brown Memorial State Wayside is a historical park in Browns Valley, Minnesota, United States, established in 1929 to honor frontiersman Sam Brown (1845–1925). On April 19, 1866, Brown rode 55 miles (89 km) to warn other settlers of an impending attack by Native Americans, and when the threat proved false he rode back through a spring blizzard to intercept his dispatch to the U.S. Army, suffering injuries that left him in a wheelchair for the rest of his life.

The park named for Brown includes a log building originally constructed in 1864 at Fort Wadsworth in what is now South Dakota and later moved to Browns Valley by town founder Joseph R. Brown, Sam's father. The Browns used the building as a residence and place of business. It was listed on the National Register of Historic Places in 1986 as the Fort Wadsworth Agency and Scout Headquarters Building for having local significance in the themes of architecture, exploration/settlement, and military history. It was nominated for being the only surviving log building of Fort Wadsworth, for its association with the noted father-and-son frontier figures, and as a rare example of post-and-plank construction.

== See also ==
- List of Minnesota state parks
- National Register of Historic Places listings in Traverse County, Minnesota
