= North Shore State Trail =

Recreational trail in Minnesota, United States

Coordinates: 46°52′22″N 92°3′31″W

- Length: 146 mi (235 km)
- Location: North Shore of Minnesota, USA
- Designation: Minnesota state trail
- Trailheads: Duluth; Grand Marais
- Use: Hiking, horseback riding, mountain biking, snowmobiling Partial: ATVs
- Grade: Flat to rolling
- Sights: Lake Superior, Superior National Forest, Finland State Forest
- Hazards: Biting insects, logging activity, remoteness, severe weather
- Surface: Natural
- Website: North Shore State Trail

The North Shore State Trail is a multi-use recreational trail in the Arrowhead Region of Minnesota, United States. The 146-mile (235 km) unpaved trail passes through the largely undeveloped backcountry inland from the North Shore of Lake Superior, between the cities of Duluth and Grand Marais. It serves primarily as a winter snowmobile route, though the 70 miles (110 km) from the community of Finland to Grand Marais are suitable for hiking, horseback riding, and mountain biking in summer. In contrast, the southwestern half of the trail is interrupted by many areas of wetness or standing water. The North Shore State Trail was established by an act of the Minnesota Legislature in 1975.

== Description ==
Some stretches of the trail follow backcountry roads. The state trail connects with numerous local snowmobile trails. A 6.6-mile (10.6 km) section around Finland is open to all-terrain vehicles. 95% of the land along the trail is public property, so opportunities for camping, fishing, and hunting are abundant. Trail users can take advantage of 14 overnight shelters with pit toilets, or camp on any public land not posted otherwise.
