= Glacial Lakes State Park =

State park in Minnesota, United States

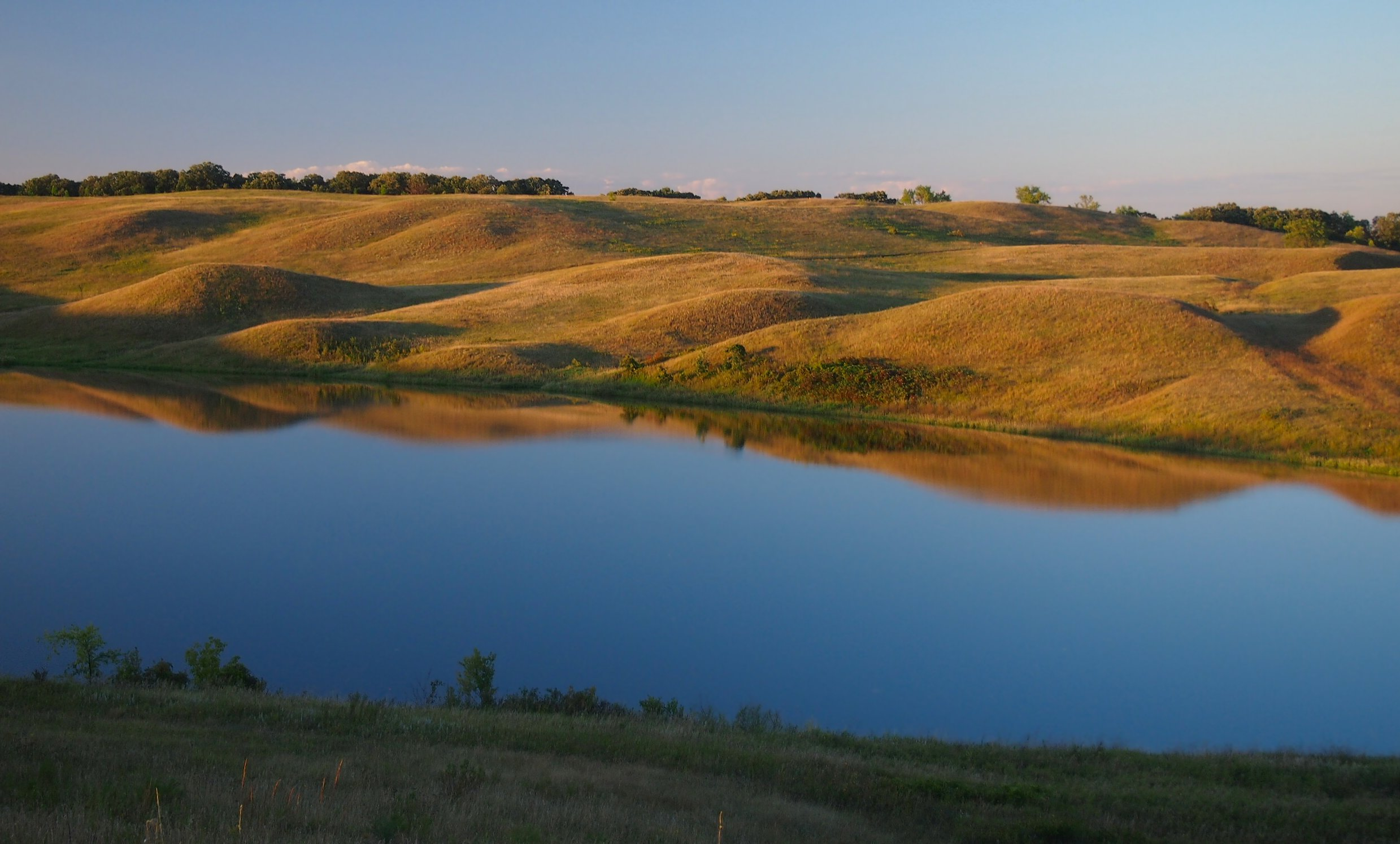
- Kettle lake and rolling hills in Glacial Lakes State Park

- Location within Minnesota Location within the United States
- Location: Pope, Minnesota, United States
- Coordinates: 45°32′14″N 95°31′19″W
- Area: 2,423 acres (9.81 km^{2})
- Elevation: 1,217 ft (371 m)
- Established: 1963
- Governing body: Minnesota Department of Natural Resources

Glacial Lakes State Park is a state park of Minnesota, USA, approximately 5 miles (8.0 km) south of Starbuck. It was founded in 1963 to preserve some of the remaining rolling prairie which previously covered much of the state. Located in the Leaf Mountains, the park and the area around it contains many glacial landforms created by the Wisconsonian glaciation.

== Biology and ecology ==
=== Flora ===
The park has many rare native plants. Prairie grasses and forbs that may be seen include big bluestem, little bluestem, Indian grass, prairie clover, pasque flowers, coneflowers and goldenrods. Wolfberry and rose shrubs are also in the park.

=== Fauna ===
Due to its location in a transition zone between prairie in the west and hardwood forest to the east, prairie and woodland birds are found at the park. Squirrels, deer, beavers, wood ducks, raccoons, pileated woodpeckers and occasionally coyotes can be found.

== Recreation ==
Swimming, fishing and boating (only electric motors are allowed) are popular activities. At 56-acres, Signalness Lake is the largest body of water in the park and has a maximum depth of 13 ft. Fish include walleye, northern pike, bass, and panfish. Due to the shallow water, winterkill can partially affect the fish population. The DNR restocks the fish.

Snowshoeing, cross-country skiing, and snowmobiling are enjoyed during the winter.

The remote location with low light pollution means stargazing is another popular activity.
