= Garden Island State Recreation Area =

Recreation area in Minnesota, United States

- Location within Minnesota Location within the United States
- Location: Lake of the Woods, Minnesota, United States
- Coordinates: 49°10′40″N 94°51′31″W
- Area: 734 acres (297 ha)
- Elevation: 1,063 ft (324 m)
- Established: 1998
- Governing body: Minnesota Department of Natural Resources

Garden Island State Recreation Area is a 734-acre (297 ha) unit of the Minnesota state park system in the Lake of the Woods, 19 nautical miles (35 km) from Zippel Bay State Park, near the northernmost part of Minnesota, the Northwest Angle.

== Wildlife ==
Pelicans, cormorants, and gulls fly around the island's eastern edge. Mammalian species of deer, mink, beaver, river otter, fox, black bear, timber wolf, and snowshoe hare are commonly seen by visitors on this island. Bald eagles nest in the trees every year.
