= Fort Ridgely Creek =

Coordinates: 44°26′59″N 94°43′24″W

- Mouth of Fort Ridgely Creek

Location
- Country: United States
- State: Minnesota
- Counties: Renville County, Nicollet County
- Cities: Fort Ridgely, Minnesota

Basin features
- River system: Minnesota River

Fort Ridgely Creek is a stream in Fort Ridgely State Park, Nicollet County, in the U.S. state of Minnesota. It is a tributary of the Minnesota River.

Fort Ridgely Creek flows past Fort Ridgely, from which the creek took its name.

== See also ==
- List of rivers of Minnesota
