= Onion River (Minnesota) =

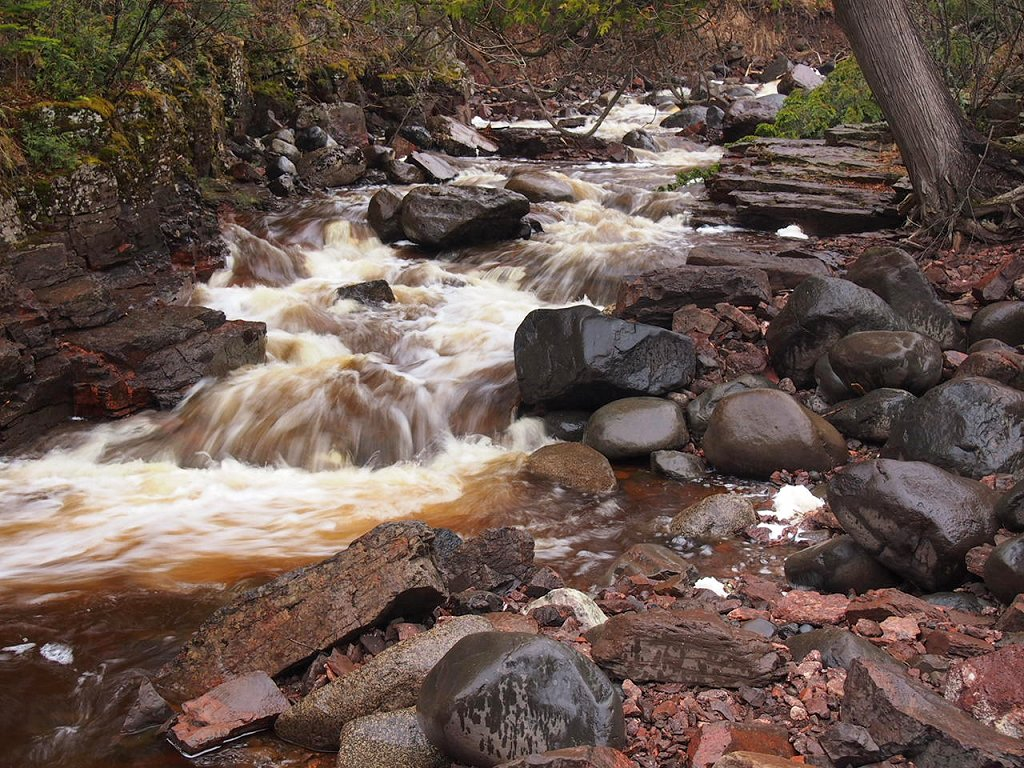

Location
- Country: United States
- State: Minnesota
- County: Cook County

Physical characteristics
- Source
  - location: Honeymoon Mountain
  - coordinates: 47.6632308°N 90.7831956°W
- Mouth
  - location: Tofte
  - coordinates: 47°36′29″N 90°46′16″W
- Length: 6.1 miles (9.8 km)

The Onion River is a 6.1-mile-long (9.8 km) stream in northeastern Minnesota, the United States, flowing directly into Lake Superior.

A small property at the mouth of the river is managed by the Minnesota Department of Natural Resources as Ray Berglund State Wayside, a memorial donated by the friends of a St. Paul businessman and conservationist in 1951.

== See also ==
- Paul Bunyan
- List of rivers of Minnesota
