= Franz Jevne State Park =

State park in Minnesota, United States

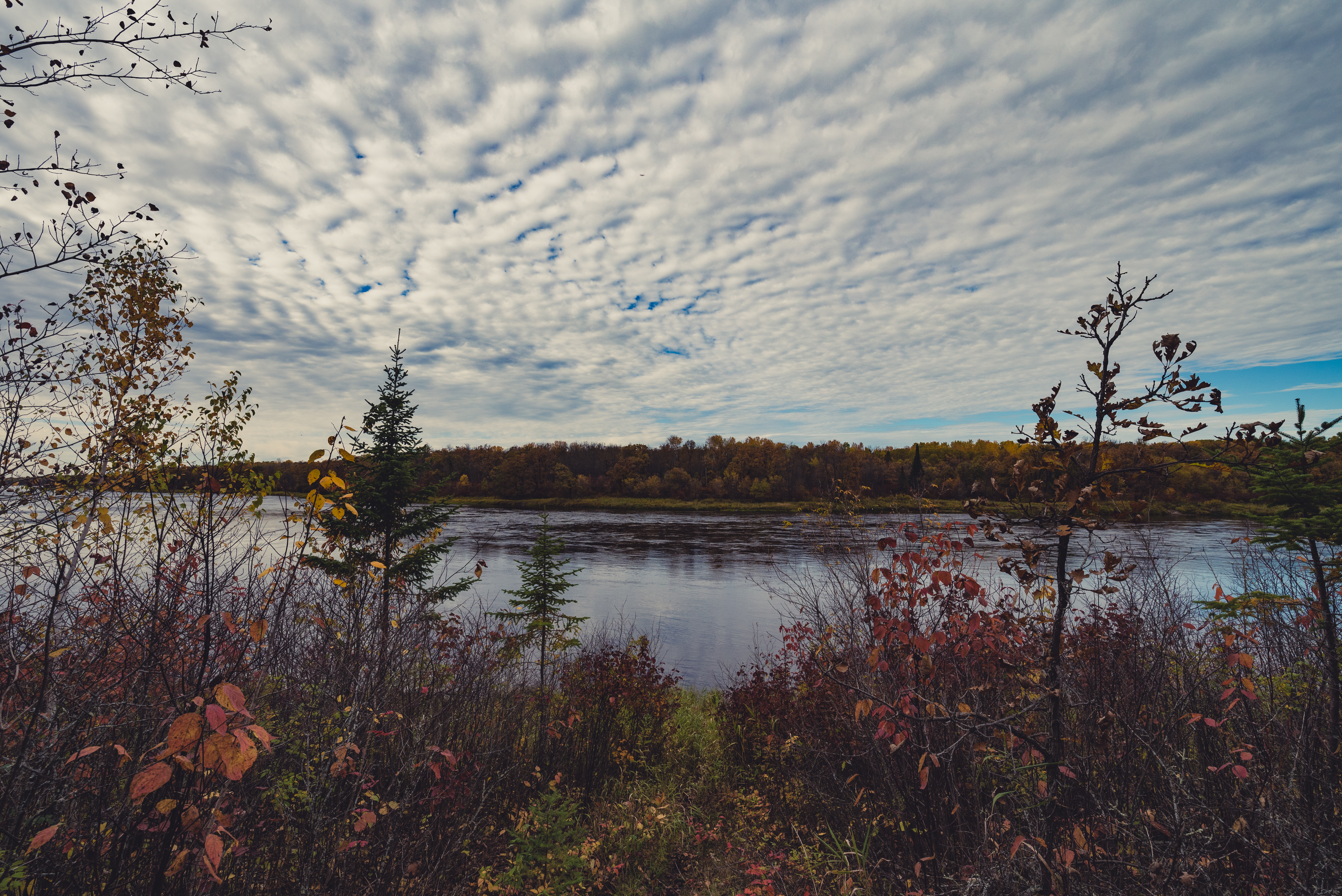
- The Rainy River on the US–Canada border at Franz Jevne State Park in Northern Minnesota

- Location within Minnesota Location within the United States
- Location: Koochiching, Minnesota, United States
- Coordinates: 48°38′32″N 94°4′39″W
- Area: 118 acres (48 ha)
- Established: 1967
- Governing body: Minnesota Department of Natural Resources

Franz Jevne State Park is a state park of Minnesota, USA. It is located on the Rainy River (which demarks the Canada–United States border) between International Falls and Baudette in Koochiching County.

Mammalian species of beaver, timber wolf, and moose roam in this park. Many birds are found along the Rainy River by visitors such as various songbirds, woodpeckers, pelicans, and bald eagles.

The land for the 118-acre (0.48 km^{2}) park was donated to the state by the Franz Jevne family; the park was created in 1967 by the Minnesota Legislature. By area, it is the smallest of Minnesota's state parks.
