= La Salle Lake State Recreation Area =

Recreation area in Minnesota, United States

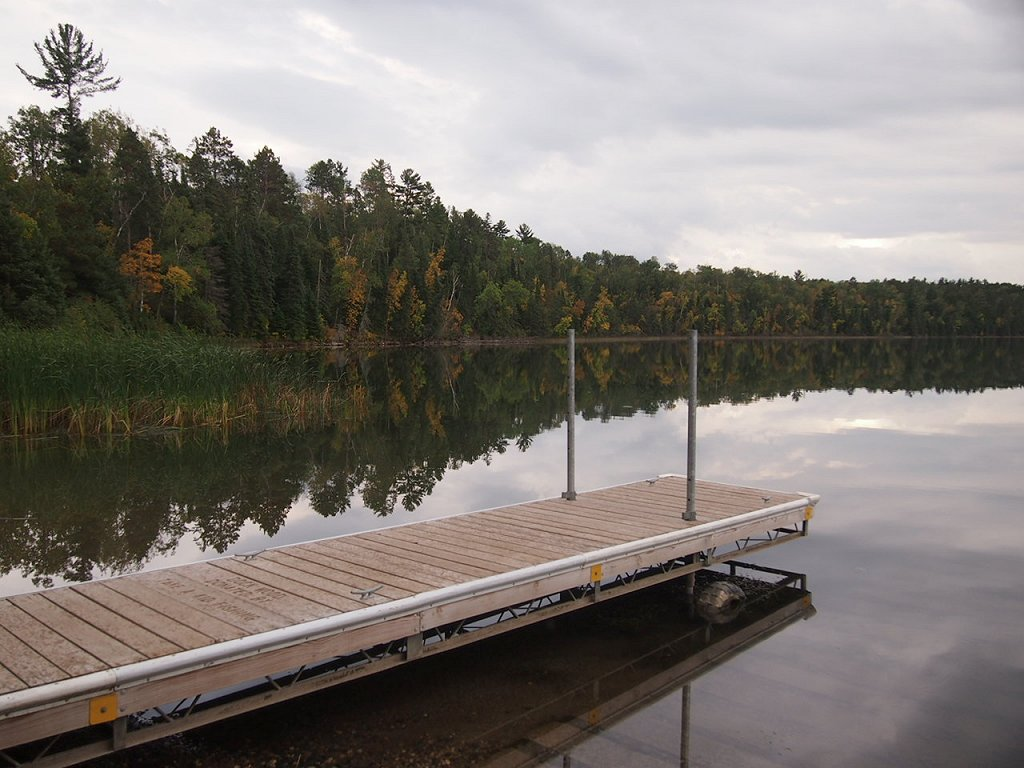
- La Salle Lake State Recreation Area

- Location within Minnesota Location within the United States
- Location: Hubbard, Minnesota, United States
- Coordinates: 47°20′13″N 95°10′14″W
- Area: 1,000 acres (4.0 km^{2})
- Established: 2011
- Designated: 2011
- Governing body: Minnesota Department of Natural Resources
- Website: https://www.dnr.state.mn.us/state_parks/park.html?id=sra00311

La Salle State Recreation Area is a state recreational area in Hubbard County, MN.

The State Recreation Area is owned and managed by the Minnesota Department of Natural Resources.
