= Schech's Mill =

- Schech Mill
- U.S. National Register of Historic Places
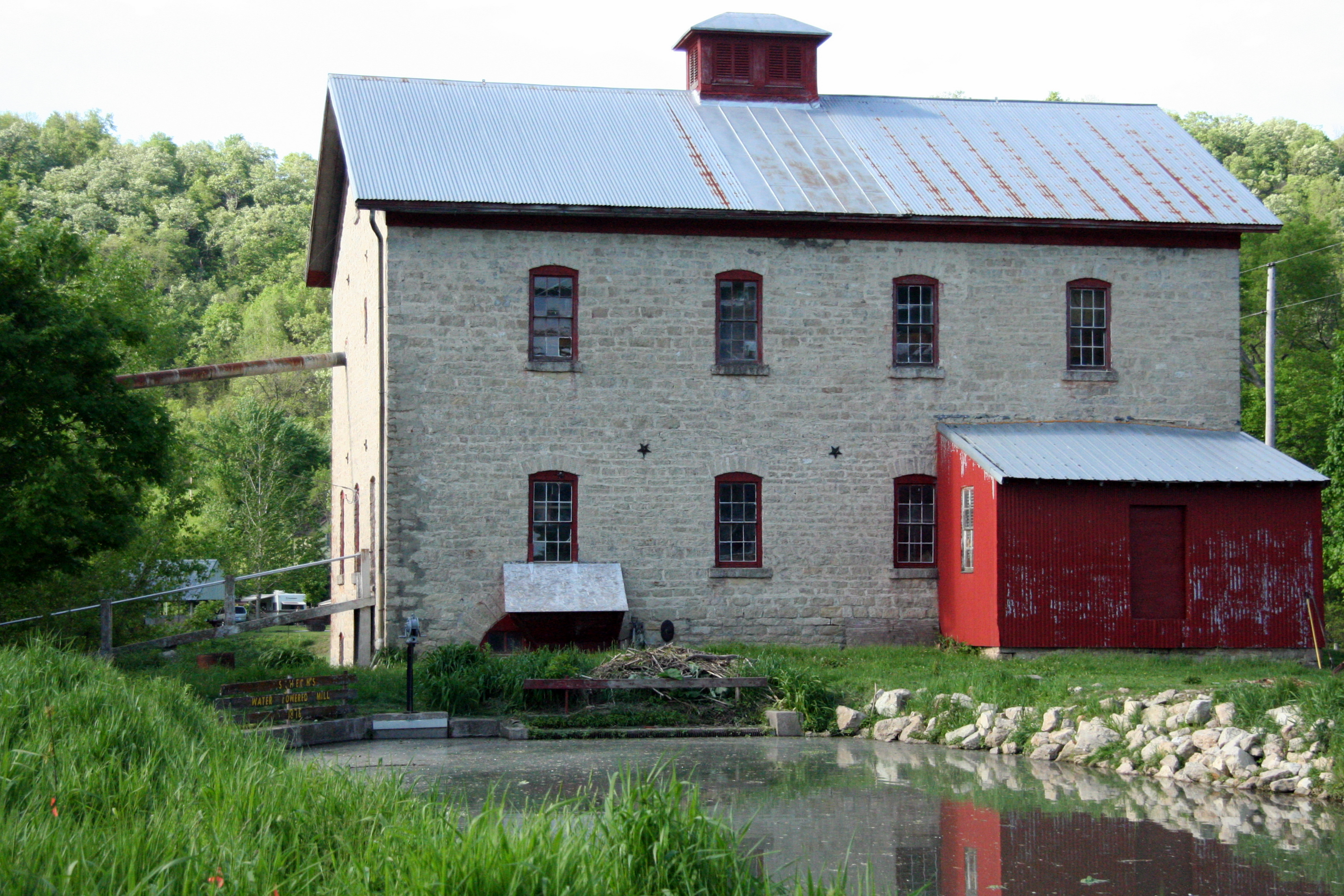
- Schech's Mill in 2011

- Location within Minnesota Location within the United States
- Nearest city: Caledonia, Minnesota
- Coordinates: 43°40′2.1″N 91°34′50″W
- Built: 1875
- NRHP reference No.: 78001548
- Added to NRHP: January 31, 1978

Schech's Mill is a historic mill in Houston County, Minnesota, United States. It is one of three watermills in Minnesota still operating solely with water power and the only one to have its original millstones. Built by John Blinn in 1876, it was purchased by a Minneapolis miller, Michael Schech who had emigrated from Bavaria, Germany. The mill produced cornmeal, rye buckwheat, wheat flour, graham flour, and whole wheat cereal, which was sold in Caledonia and Houston, Minnesota. Schech's Mill is unique in the state for retaining intact and operable machinery from the 1870s, after the middlings purifier had been introduced but before millstones were supplanted by roller mills. In 1922, a concrete dam was built to replace the original wooden one.

Schech Mill is situated in the Driftless Area – a region of the American Midwest noted for its deeply carved river valleys.

Private tours of the mill can be arranged most summer weekends which include an authentic flour grinding demonstration.
