= Fort Ridgely State Park =

- Fort Ridgely State Park CCC/Rustic Style Historic Resources
- U.S. National Register of Historic Places
- U.S. Historic district
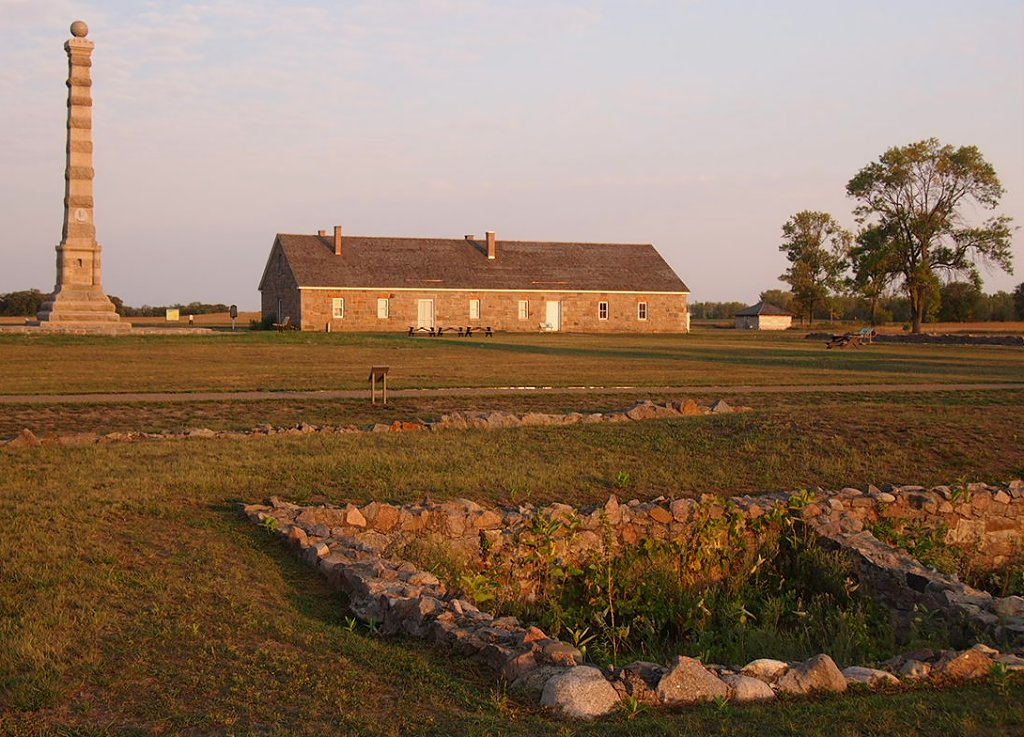

- Location within Minnesota Location within the United States
- Nearest city: New Ulm, Minnesota
- Coordinates: 44°27′3″N 94°43′36″W
- Area: 220 acres (89 ha)
- Built: 1934; 92 years ago
- Architect: Multiple
- Architectural style: National Park Service rustic
- MPS: Minnesota State Park CCC/WPA/Rustic Style MPS
- NRHP reference No.: 89001668
- Added to NRHP: October 25, 1989

Fort Ridgely State Park is a state park of Minnesota, USA, on the Minnesota River south of Fairfax. It preserves Fort Ridgely, site of the Battle of Fort Ridgely during the Dakota War of 1862. It was the only Minnesota state park with a 9-hole golf course, which overlooks the Minnesota River and goes along Fort Ridgely Creek.

The park was established in 1911. The Civilian Conservation Corps Rustic Style buildings within the state park, built between 1934 and 1936, are listed on the National Register of Historic Places.

In September 2016, the golf course was closed due to declining revenue. A group of local residents launched a campaign hoping to raise enough money to lease the course from the Minnesota Department of Natural Resources (DNR) and re-open it. However the group failed to win the support of the Fairfax City Council. The DNR plans to plow the course under and restore it to native prairie.
