= Big Stone Lake State Park =

State park in Minnesota, United States

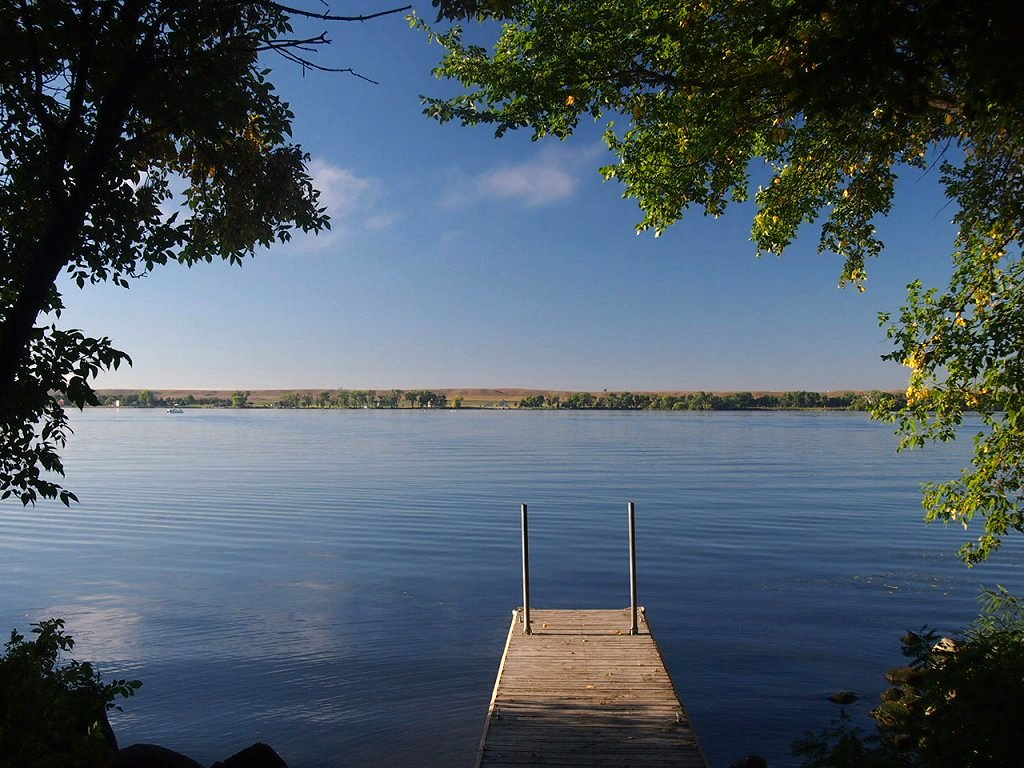
- Big Stone Lake from the Meadowbrook Area

- Location within Minnesota Location within the United States
- Location: Big Stone, Minnesota, United States
- Coordinates: 45°22′57″N 96°30′47″W
- Area: 986 acres (399 ha)
- Elevation: 991 ft (302 m)
- Established: 1961
- Governing body: Minnesota Department of Natural Resources

Big Stone Lake State Park is a state park of Minnesota, United States, on the shore of Big Stone Lake, the headwaters of the Minnesota River. It is home to wildlife including deer, raccoons, squirrels, meadowlarks, sedge wrens, pheasants, bobolinks, wild turkeys, thrashers, and mourning doves. The two sections of the park, the Bonanza Area in the north and the Meadowbrook Area in the south, are 12 miles (19 km) apart. South Dakota's Hartford Beach State Park is on the opposite shore of the lake. Big Stone Lake State Park is used for picnics, camping, hiking, geocaching and other outdoor recreation.
