= Beaver Creek Valley State Park =

State park in Minnesota, United States

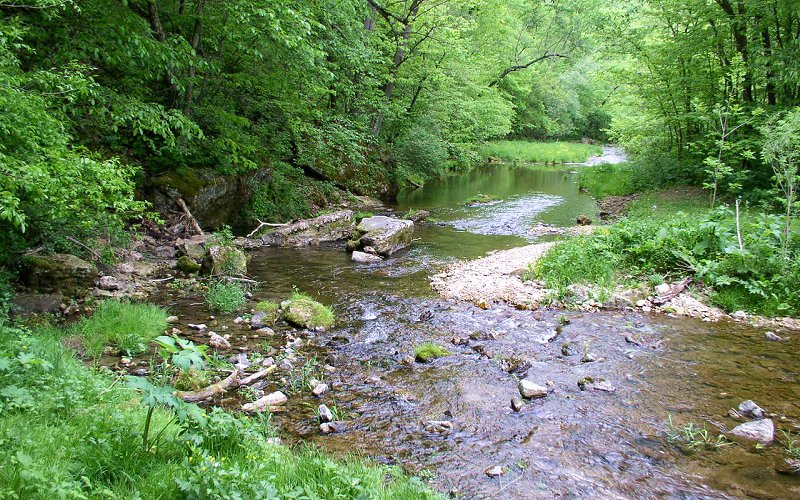
- East Beaver Creek, a spring-fed trout stream, has carved the narrow Beaver Creek Valley.

- Location within Minnesota Location within the United States
- Location: Houston, Minnesota, United States
- Coordinates: 43°39′0″N 91°34′58″W
- Area: 1,187 acres (4.80 km^{2})
- Elevation: 833 ft (254 m)
- Established: 1937
- Governing body: Minnesota Department of Natural Resources

Beaver Creek Valley State Park

Beaver Creek Valley State Park is a state park of Minnesota, United States, featuring a steep, narrow valley carved by East Beaver Creek. This spring-fed stream is a fishing destination for its native brook trout, and introduced brown trout. The park rests on a heavily forested valley, up to 250 feet (76 m) deep in places, amidst the farmland of southeastern Minnesota. Located near the town of Caledonia, the park was developed in the 1930s by the Works Progress Administration. The parkland exhibits the highly stream-carved terrain characteristic of the Driftless Area.

== Natural history ==
Between 500 and 450 million years ago shallow inland seas covered the region. Sediment built up into a layer called Oneota dolomite followed by a layer called Jordan sandstone, followed by a second layer of dolomite. Today the Jordan sandstone forms the walls of the valley while the upper layer of dolomite caps the ridges. Both types of rock are water-permeable, resulting in numerous springs.

The deep valley of East Beaver Creek is indicative of the Driftless Area. Whereas most of the Midwestern United States was blanketed with till, or drift, by three successive ice ages, the Driftless Area remained ice-free. Therefore, streams and rivers have had a longer time to cut into their beds, eroding deep valleys and leaving high ridges.

East Beaver Creek, which joins with West Beaver Creek at the north end of the park, is in the drainage system of the Root River. Flash flooding can occur after heavy rainfall. The creek supports wild population of brown trout.

== Flora and fauna ==
Within the valley the vegetation is bottomland hardwoods such as black ash, willow, box elder, cottonwood, and elm. Higher on the valley walls and on the flat ground beyond the forest is a mix of maple, walnut, basswood, and oak. Some south and west-facing slopes bear remnant prairie patches. Several rare or endangered plants are found in the park.

Acadian flycatchers and Louisiana waterthrushes, birds rare in Minnesota, nest within this park. Mammals that roam here are raccoons, deer, badgers, minks, beavers, gray and red foxes, muskrats, and wild turkeys. There are also resident timber rattlesnakes but they are rarely encountered by visitors. When a hiker was bitten in the park in July 2011, it was the first unprovoked attack by a timber rattlesnake in Minnesota since 1996.

== Cultural history ==
A Native American village was once located in Beaver Creek Valley, as indicated by archaeological field surveys. Some prehistoric stone tools have been found.

Europeans began homesteading the area in the 1850s, attracted by rich farming soil, hardwood lumber, and streams conducive to milling. Much of the land around Beaver Creek Valley was too rugged to farm, so most of the parcels were used as pasture or woodlots. In 1876 a gristmill was built on Beaver Creek. Now known as the Schech Mill, it is the last water-powered mill in Minnesota still operating with its original equipment.

Beaver Creek Valley was proposed as a state park in the 1930s, and acquisition of the privately owned lots began in 1936. The park was authorized by the Minnesota Legislature the following year. A small Works Progress Administration crew arrived in 1938 and built the entrance road, flood control structures, picnic ground, and trails. The campground was developed in the late 1940s. The boundaries of the park were extended in the late 1960s out of concern that landowners along the blufftops might cut the timber, causing erosion. However few owners were willing to sell these lots, as most of it was good farmland which, moreover, wouldn't be easily accessible to parkgoers on the valley floor. In the face of anti-expansion sentiment, the 1978 state legislature redrew the statutory boundaries of the park to include only state-owned land. A provision remains by which additional land could be acquired from willing sellers without legislative action. The Minnesota Department of Natural Resources has been interested in adding the Schech Mill to the park, but the family that has owned it since 1887 has preferred to operate the mill privately as a tourist attraction.

In the mid-1990s Beaver Creek Valley State Park was caught in a dispute between fishing and birdwatching interests. To improve the habitat for large trout, fisheries staff were setting rocks along the banks of the creek to prevent erosion and create overhangs where the fish could hide. However Louisiana waterthrushes and sometimes cerulean warblers nest at the base of creekside trees, some of which were being removed to make space for the rocks. After a public battle over the state's wildlife management policies, the upper and lower sections of East Beaver Creek were modified and the middle section left alone.

== Recreation ==
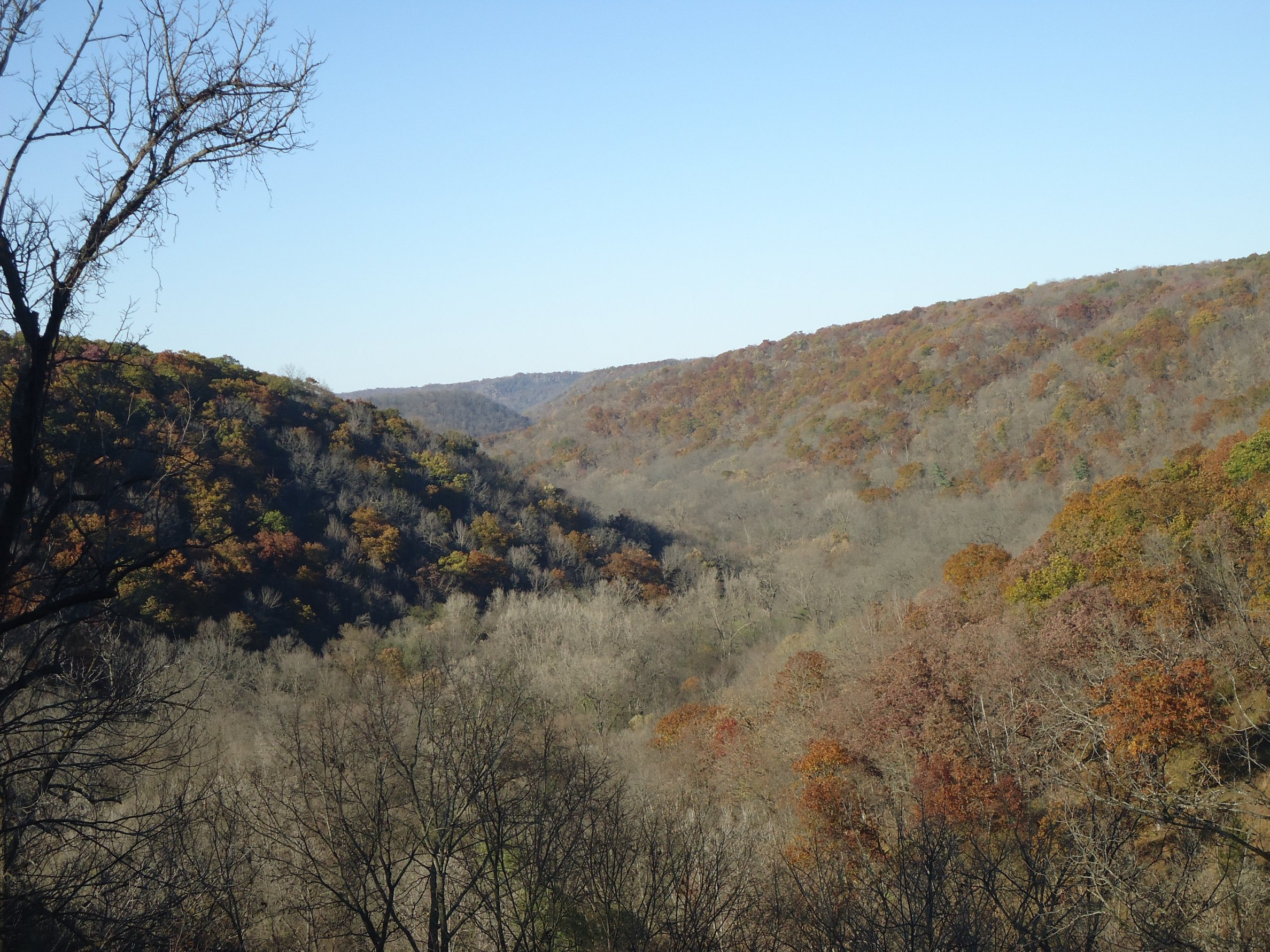
Beaver Creek Valley in late autumn

Fishing for brown trout is a popular activity in Beaver Creek Valley State Park. Trophy specimens of 16 inches (41 cm) or more have been caught. Because the valley is so narrow, the campground sites are staggered on either side of the park road. There are 42 drive-in sites (16 with electrical hookups), six walk-in sites, a camper cabin, and at the end of the park road three group camp sites. There are eight miles (13 km) of hiking trails.
