= Hay Creek Township, Goodhue County, Minnesota =

Hay Creek Township, Minnesota
- Township
- Location within the state of Minnesota Hay Creek Township, Minnesota (the United States)
- Coordinates: 44°29′54″N 92°29′50″W
- Country: United States
- State: Minnesota
- County: Goodhue

Area
  - Total: 34.3 sq mi (88.9 km^{2})
  - Land: 34.3 sq mi (88.9 km^{2})
  - Water: 0 sq mi (0.0 km^{2})
- Elevation: 889 ft (271 m)

Population (2000)
  - Total: 862
  - Density: 25/sq mi (9.7/km^{2})
- Time zone: UTC-6 (Central (CST))
  - Summer (DST): UTC-5 (CDT)
- FIPS code: 27-27818
- GNIS feature ID: 0664422
- Website: https://haycreektownshipmn.org/

Hay Creek Township is a township in Goodhue County, Minnesota, United States. The population was 862 at the 2000 census. The unincorporated community of Hay Creek is located within the township.

Hay Creek Township was organized in 1858, and took its name from Hay Creek.

== Geography ==
According to the United States Census Bureau, the township has a total area of 34.3 square miles (89 km^{2}), all land.

State Highway 58 (MN 58) serves as a main route in the township.

A Lutheran church formerly existed in this township. In 1883, the church building was sold to the newly organized Salem Church in Yellow Bank Township. The structure was dismantled and shipped from Goodhue County to Lac qui Parle County by rail. (Jon Willand, A Stirring on the Prairie).

== Demographics ==
As of the census of 2000, there were 862 people, 280 households, and 241 families residing in the township. The population density was 25.1 inhabitants per square mile (9.7/km^{2}). There were 289 housing units at an average density of 8.4 per square mile (3.2/km^{2}). The racial makeup of the township was 97.68% White, 1.16% Native American, 0.46% Asian, 0.23% from other races, and 0.46% from two or more races. Hispanic or Latino of any race were 0.58% of the population.

There were 280 households, out of which 45.7% had children under the age of 18 living with them, 79.6% were married couples living together, 2.9% had a female householder with no husband present, and 13.6% were non-families. 7.9% of all households were made up of individuals, and 3.2% had someone living alone who was 65 years of age or older. The average household size was 3.08 and the average family size was 3.27.

In the township the population was spread out, with 31.0% under the age of 18, 5.2% from 18 to 24, 29.2% from 25 to 44, 25.6% from 45 to 64, and 8.9% who were 65 years of age or older. The median age was 37 years. For every 100 females, there were 103.3 males. For every 100 females age 18 and over, there were 103.8 males.

The median income for a household in the township was $63,594, and the median income for a family was $63,500. Males had a median income of $38,056 versus $28,750 for females. The per capita income for the township was $24,034. About 2.9% of families and 3.8% of the population were below the poverty line, including 4.7% of those under age 18 and 5.5% of those age 65 or over.
