= Sam Brown (frontiersman) =

American frontiersman and settler (1845–1925)

Samuel Jerome Brown
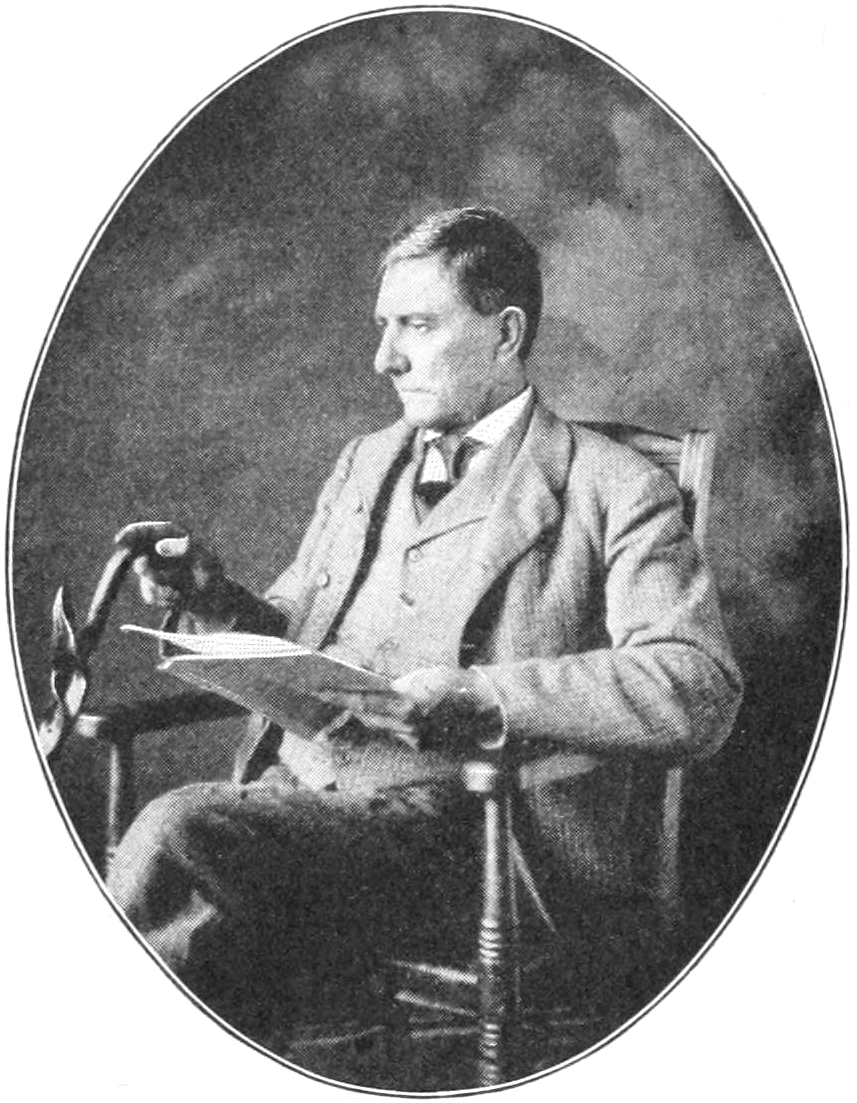
- Brown c. 1905
- Born: March 7, 1845; Near Lake Traverse, Iowa Territory, U.S.
- Died: August 29, 1925 (aged 80); Browns Valley, Minnesota, U.S.
- Relatives: Joseph R. Brown (father); Susan Frenier (mother)
- Military career
- Allegiance: United States of America
- Branch: United States Army
- Unit: United States Army Indian Scouts
- Conflicts: Dakota War of 1862; Indian Wars

Samuel Jerome Brown (March 7, 1845 – August 29, 1925), better known as Sam Brown, was an American frontiersman and settler in Minnesota and Dakota Territory. He earned regional fame as the "Paul Revere of the Prairie" or the "Prairie Paul Revere" for riding 150 miles (240 km) on the night of April 19–20, 1866, first to warn others of an expected Native American attack and then, when the threat proved false, back through a spring blizzard to intercept his own request for reinforcements from the U.S. Army. The ordeal left him dependent on a wheelchair for the rest of his life. Brown went on to serve as an educator, civic leader, advocate for Native Americans, and historian.

== Early life ==
Sam Brown was born on March 7, 1845, in the Iowa Territory near Lake Traverse, a location which is now in South Dakota. His father was Joseph R. Brown, who would go on to be a notable Indian agent and politician, and his mother was Susan Freniere Brown, a mixed ancestry descendant of Dakota chief Tatankamani. Sam Brown was thus one-eighth Dakota and an accepted member of the Sisseton Band.

Brown was 17 years old when the Dakota War of 1862 broke out. He was among the numerous mixed-blood and noncombatant Dakota taken captive by Dakota combatants during the conflict. Most were freed during the Surrender at Camp Release, Brown included, and he subsequently joined the Minnesota militia as a scout while Western Dakota continued to resist U.S. expansion. Under the command of his own father, Brown was ultimately posted to Fort Wadsworth beyond the border of Minnesota in the Dakota Territory. This fort, later renamed Fort Sisseton, was established in 1864 to protect noncombatant Eastern Dakota and guard against further attacks on white settlers.

Among a semi-military scouting unit composed of white frontiersmen, mixed-bloods, and allied Eastern Dakotas, Brown helped locate hostile encampments, rode patrols, provided escorts, and served as an interpreter and courier. He distinguished himself in his duties and was promoted to scout inspector in March 1866. He was soon supervising scouts for the entire district.

== Ride ==
On April 19, 1866, a Dakota chief, Oüiduze, reported to Brown that five days earlier he had seen moccasin tracks from what he took to be a war party heading from the James River near Jamestown, North Dakota, toward white settlements at the head of the Minnesota River. Brown immediately dispatched a warning to Lieutenant Colonel C. P. Adams, in command of the area's largest U.S. force at nearby Fort Abercrombie. He then set off himself to alert a scout encampment deep in "unfriendly" territory on the Elm River near present-day Ordway, South Dakota.

Brown left Fort Wadsworth just as night was falling and rode 55 miles (89 km) across the dark, nearly featureless prairie in just five hours, navigating by the North Star. However, when Brown reached the Elm River station at midnight with his warning, chief scout Joseph Rouilliard assured him that the tracks had been left by messengers dispatched by Brown's own father to call Dakota in western Minnesota to a peace council at Fort Rice. Brown immediately realized that the false alarm he'd sent to Fort Abercrombie could mistakenly lead U.S. soldiers into provoking an actual war.

Despite his exhaustion, Brown knew he could not wait till daylight, when a lone horseman on the prairie would be vulnerable to any hostile Native Americans. Rouilliard provided a fresh horse and Brown set off to retrace his journey. However, the sky had clouded over, covering the North Star, and he was eventually overtaken by a violent spring blizzard approaching from the west. With no visible stars or landmarks, he kept the wind at his back to stay on course. Twice his mount broke through ice, spilling Brown into frigid rivers.

By daybreak Brown reached the western slope of the Coteau des Prairies. From the ridgeline, however, he found to his dismay that the wind must have shifted during the night, leading him 25 miles (40 km) southwest of Fort Wadsworth. The blizzard still raged and now Brown was forced to face into the wind as he corrected course. Soon his legs, fingers, and face were numb from the cold. He chose to fulfill his mission rather than take shelter in a wooded ravine.

Brown reached Fort Wadsworth's scout headquarters around 8:00 a.m. He dismounted and immediately collapsed, his legs unable to support him. He managed to see to his horse before crawling into the scout cabin and falling unconscious. He awoke in mid-afternoon and stumbled a quarter mile to the next scout's cabin, where he was able to get word to his commanding officer Lieutenant James F. Cochrane, who dispatched a courier to Fort Abercrombie to cancel the alert.

Sam Brown was just 21 when he made his epic ride, covering 150 miles (240 km) in 15 hours in horrific conditions. He was never able to walk again, and spent the rest of his life using a wheelchair for mobility. Brown also wrote that the ride "deranged my eyes, dimmed my eyesight, paralyzed my muscular powers, deprived me of the use of my legs, and of all natural power of motion, and permanently impaired my general health."

== Later life ==
Brown's father Joseph gained title to 1,000 acres (400 ha) and founded a town in Minnesota which became known, after his death in 1870, as Browns Valley. Joseph Brown had the scout headquarters building moved there, where father and son used it as a private residence, trading post, and stagecoach inn. Sam Brown opened a post office in the building and became the town's first postmaster. Two years later, in 1867, he became the first notary public in Traverse County. One-eighth Dakota, Sam Brown became closely involved in Native–white relations in the region. He was an advocate for the local Dakota bands, campaigning, for example, to secure annuities for Indigenous scouts who had assisted the U.S. Army. He worked to provide educational and religious services to Native Americans as a teacher and lay preacher at an Episcopal mission, superintendent of the Sisseton Manual Labor Boarding School, and editor of a publication called Daylight. He was also involved in various business dealings, primarily real estate.

Marrying, he and his wife Phebe had four children. Later in life Brown became interested in history, writing several articles and corresponding with other historians about frontier life and the Dakota War of 1862. Of his famous ride, though, he would merely say "it is nothing to talk about. I did my duty as I saw it. That is all". He died in Browns Valley on August 29, 1925, at the age of 80.

== Legacy ==
Sam Brown earned regional fame for his 1866 ride, enhanced by his civic achievements and connections to several major figures in Minnesota history. Shortly after his death, citizens of Browns Valley successfully lobbied the state to establish a memorial. Now known as Sam Brown Memorial State Wayside, it includes interpretive signage and the 1864 scout headquarters building, which is operated by the Browns Valley Historical Society as a museum.
