= Kilen Woods State Park =

State park in Minnesota, United States

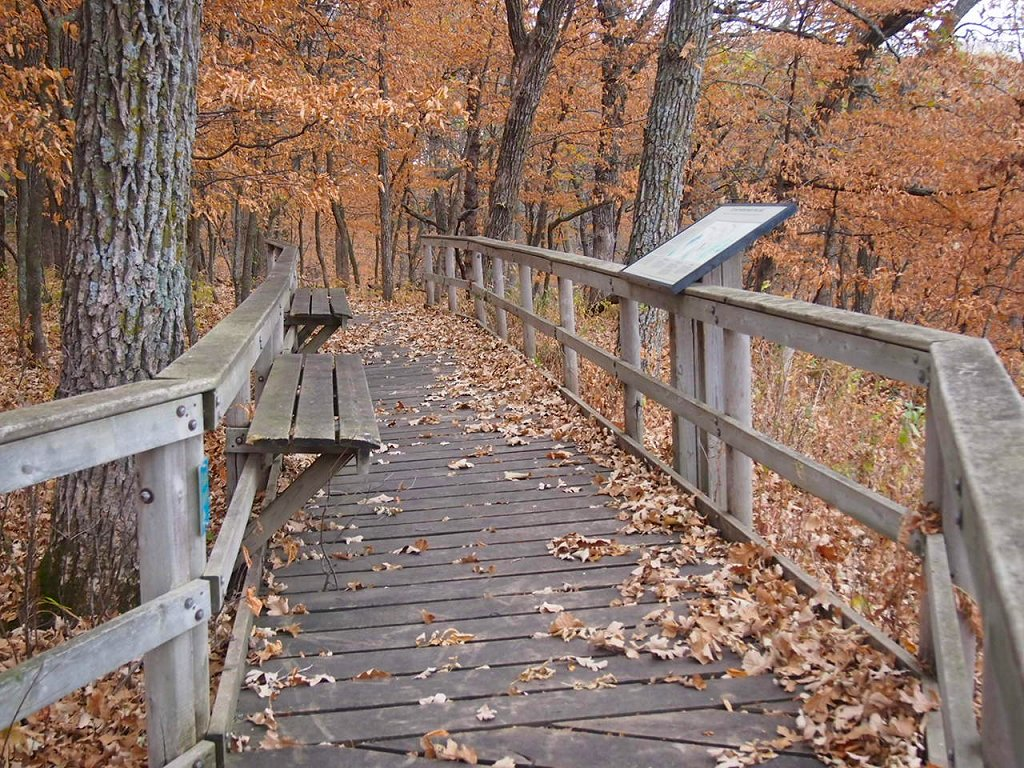
- Dinosaur Ridge Overlook in Kilen Woods State Park

- Location within Minnesota Location within the United States
- Location: Jackson, Minnesota, United States
- Coordinates: 43°43′35″N 95°3′46″W
- Area: 548 acres (222 ha)
- Established: 1945
- Governing body: Minnesota Department of Natural Resources

Kilen Woods State Park is a state park of Minnesota, US, on the Des Moines River south of Windom. The park has 5 miles of hiking trails.
