= John A. Latsch State Park =

State park in Minnesota, United States

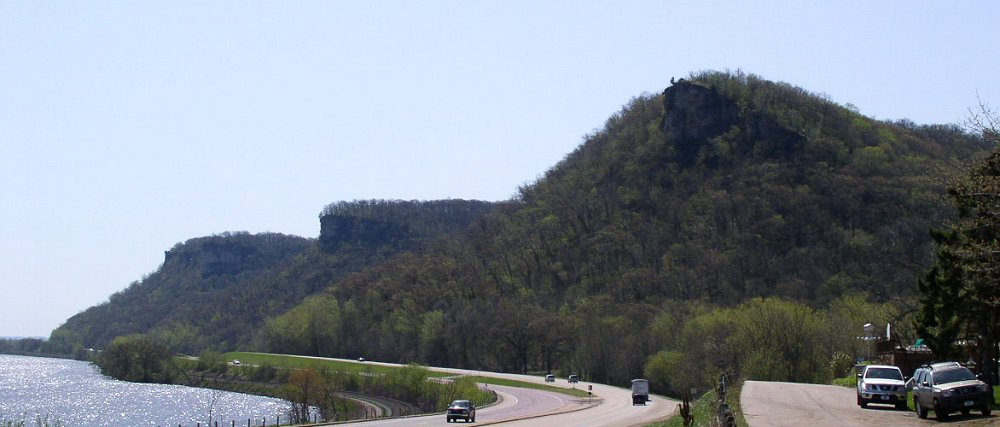
- Mounts Faith, Hope, and Charity in John A. Latsch State Park

- Location within Minnesota Location within the United States
- Location: Winona, Minnesota, United States
- Coordinates: 44°9′43″N 91°49′20″W
- Area: 1,654 acres (6.69 km^{2})
- Elevation: 860 ft (260 m)
- Established: 1925
- Governing body: Minnesota Department of Natural Resources

John A. Latsch State Park is a 1,654-acre (7 km^{2}) state park of Minnesota, USA, on the Mississippi River, 12 miles (19 km) northwest of Winona. The park contains three steep bluffs rising 500 feet (150 m) above the river which are named Mount Faith, Mount Hope, and Mount Charity. The park is nearly undeveloped, with a small walk-in campground (closed to use currently) and only one trail. It functions primarily as a wayside on U.S. Route 61, which runs between the river and the base of the bluffs. Lock and Dam No. 5 is adjacent to the park.

== Natural history ==
The park sits on limestone laid down on the floor of a shallow sea 500 million years ago. Torrents of runoff at the end of the Wisconsin glaciation 10,000 years ago carved the bed of the Mississippi River down into this limestone, leaving high bluffs along its banks. The park is situated in the Driftless Area, an atypically rugged region of the Upper Midwest because it was never glaciated and covered with a layer of glacial till, or drift.

== Flora and fauna ==
The steepness of the three bluffs deterred logging, and the forest cover today is a high quality mix of many different species. These include several kinds of oak, maple, elm, cedar, and ash, as well as black walnut, hickory, basswood, ironwood, birch, and poplar. A great variety of birds migrate past the park along the Mississippi Flyway. Terrestrial species include white-tailed deer, coyotes, red foxes, opossums, and timber rattlesnakes.

== Cultural history ==
The three bluffs were named by steamboat captains, who used them as landmarks. A logging town with its own steamboat landing was active here in the 1850s, supplying lumber to sawmills in newly founded Winona. The townsite has since been submerged by water backed up by the lock and dam.

John A. Latsch was a Winona businessman who loved fishing beneath these three bluffs. He purchased some of the property and, along with an adjacent landowner, donated 350 acres (1.4 km^{2}) for a state park in 1925. Latsch was a lifelong patron of conservation; Whitewater State Park and Wisconsin's Perrot State Park both grew out of other parcels he donated. He was also a founder of the Izaak Walton League, an early environmental non-profit organization.

Development at this park stagnated, largely because the only level land was at the mouths of the small ravines that separated the three bluffs. The Civilian Conservation Corps blazed a trail to the top of Mount Charity, the highest of the trio, in 1933. Latsch, who died the following year, recorded his regret that he hadn't acquired more property in the beginning. In 1963 the Minnesota Legislature authorized an extension of the park's boundaries, to include a sizeable area behind the bluffs. However this property is yet to be acquired from its private owners, and the publicly held land in the park amounts to only 389 acres (1.6 km^{2}). A 1971 analysis recommended that John A. Latsch State Park be reclassified as a Scientific and Natural Area, though this has not been acted upon either.

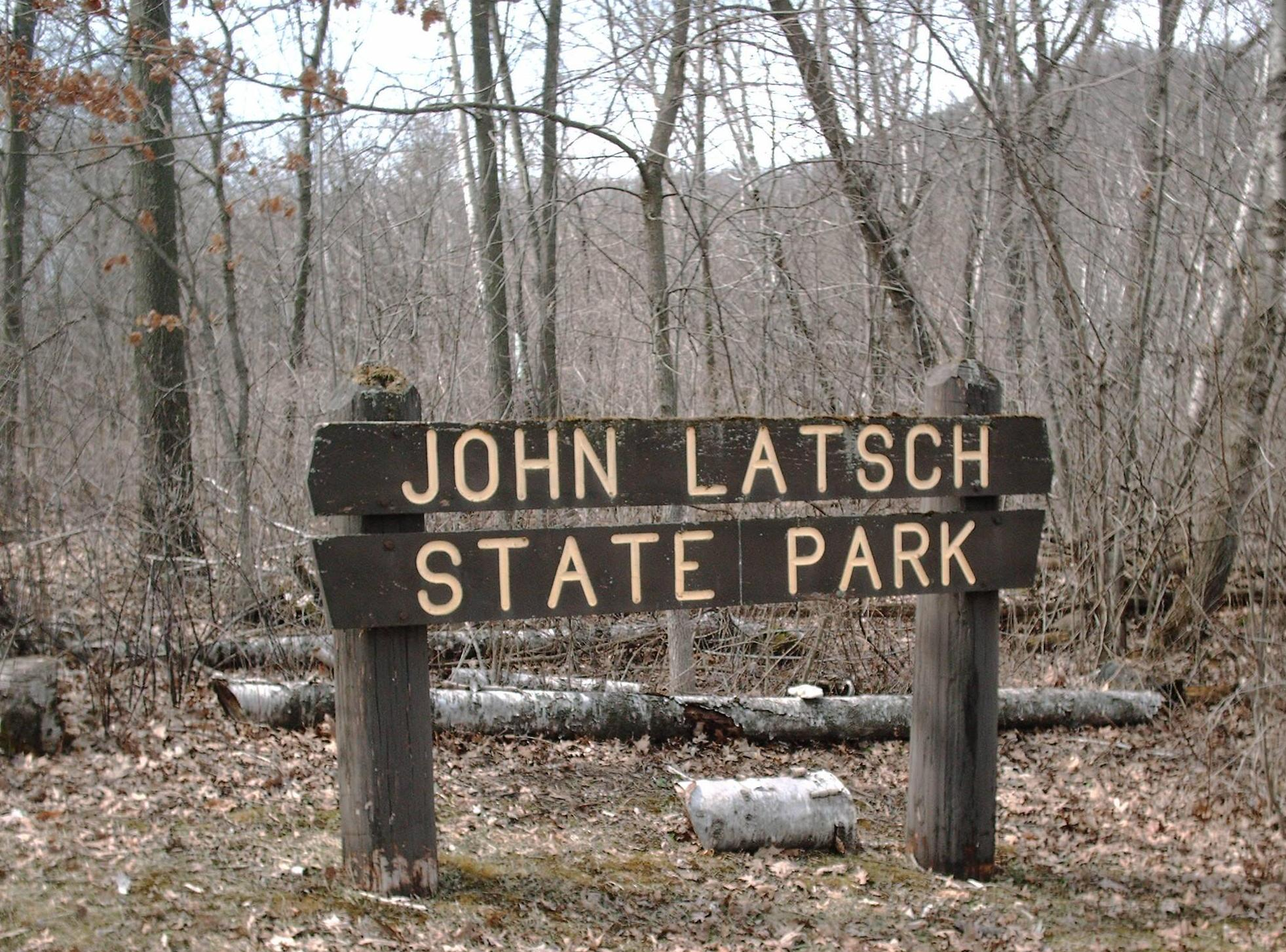
John A. Latsch State Park entrance

== Recreation ==
The park features a picnic ground and 7 primitive walk-in campsites (which are currently closed to the public). Water is available seasonally from a pump. The only trail is the steep, 0.5-mile (800 m) Riverview Trail, which climbs 450 feet (137 m) to the top of Mount Charity, offering a panoramic view of the Mississippi River Valley.
