= Myre-Big Island State Park =

State park in Freeborn County, Minnesota, United States

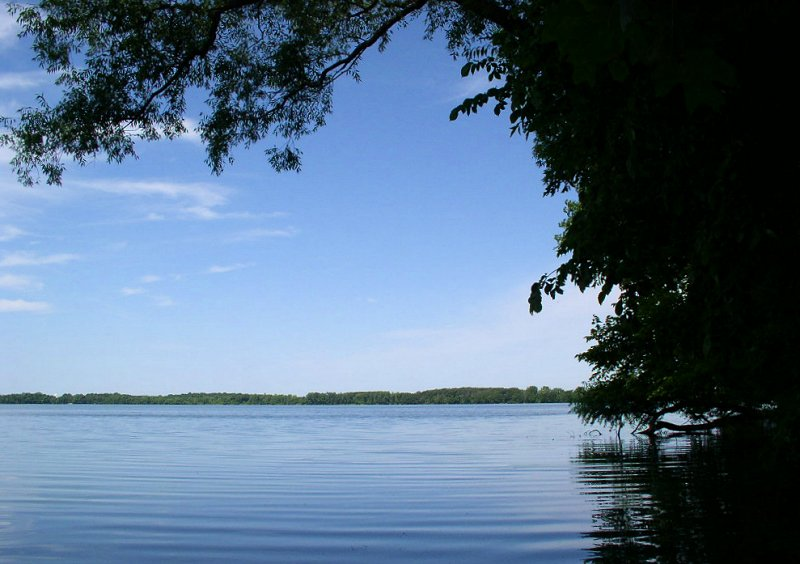
- Albert Lea Lake from Myre-Big Island State Park

- Location within Minnesota Location within the United States
- Location: Freeborn, Minnesota, United States
- Coordinates: 43°38′9″N 93°18′32″W
- Area: 1,578 acres (6.39 km^{2})
- Elevation: 1,230 ft (370 m)
- Established: 1947
- Governing body: Minnesota Department of Natural Resources

Myre-Big Island State Park is a state park of Minnesota, USA, just outside the city of Albert Lea. It has an area of 1,578 acres (6.39 km^{2}). The park protects 8 miles (13 km) of shoreline on Albert Lea Lake. The nucleus of the park is Big Island, a 117-acre (0.47 km^{2}) island attached to the mainland by a causeway. In turn a causeway connects Big Island to Little Island. The park was formerly named Helmer Myre State Park after former Minnesota State Senator Helmer Myre.

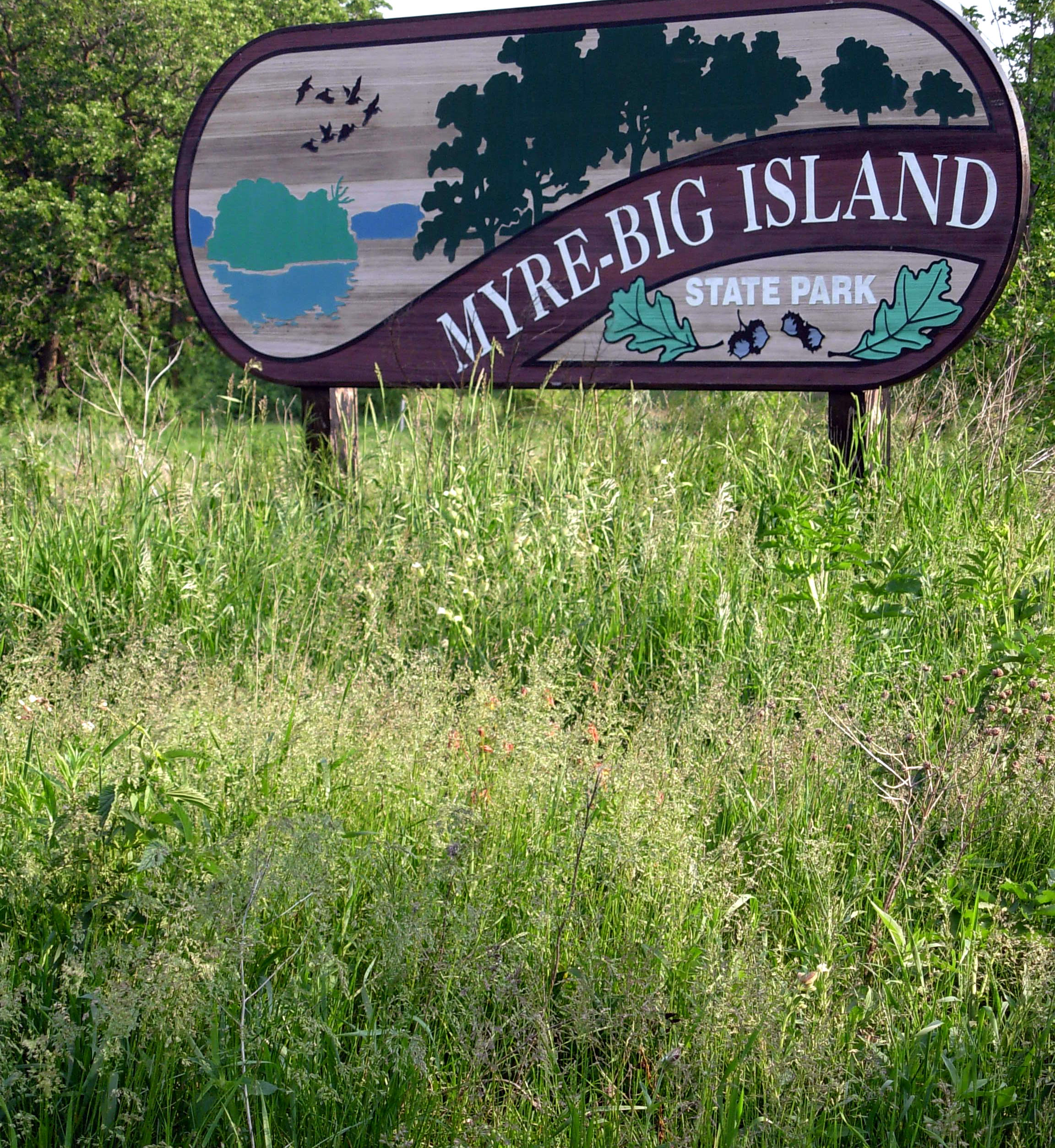
Myre-Big Island State Park entrance

== Natural history ==
The park is situated on the Bemis Moraine, which marks the southern extent of a glacial lobe during the Wisconsin glaciation 10,000 years ago. As the glacier retreated, the moraine caused the meltwater to back up behind it. Albert Lea Lake was created as a moraine-dammed lake and today covers 2,600 acres (11 km^{2}). The park also contains an esker, a sinuous ridge of sand and gravel dropped by a stream running under the glacier.

The mainland is primarily vegetated in oak savanna with several wetlands. Restoration ecology projects, including controlled burning and water retention strategies, are ongoing to maintain and improve these habitats. Big Island, protected from the wildfires that suppressed tree growth in the savannas and prairie of southern Minnesota, bears a closed forest savanna which looks like an old growth hardwood forest. It comprises maple, basswood, elm, green ash, ironwood, and red oak, with willows along the lakeshore. Albert Lea Lake is highly eutrophic. Moraine dammed lakes typically fill in, but this process has been exacerbated by agricultural runoff.

== Wildlife ==
This park is home to white-tailed deer, red and gray foxes, raccoons, muskrats, opossums, squirrels, and several species of bats.

It is also known for its birdwatching opportunities, especially during the spring and fall migration. One particularly notable species is the American white pelican which congregates on Albert Lea Lake.

== Cultural history ==
Artifacts, many of them collected by a local amateur archaeologist named Owen Johnson in the mid-1940s, reveal that humans have been living around the area's lakes for 9,000 years. Johnson became an advocate for protecting Big Island as a state park, as did state Senator Helmer Myre, another resident of Albert Lea. At the time Big Island was divided into seventeen privately owned lots, and some of the owners were considering logging their trees. In 1947 a bill backed by Myre easily passed through the Minnesota Legislature which authorized the Department of Conservation to acquire the 117-acre (47 ha) island. An organization of local supporters raised additional funds to buy out the current owners and develop a picnic ground and trails. While referred to as Big Island State Park, the park did not receive an official name until 1953, when it was formally dubbed Myre State Park to honor the senator, who had died two years previously.

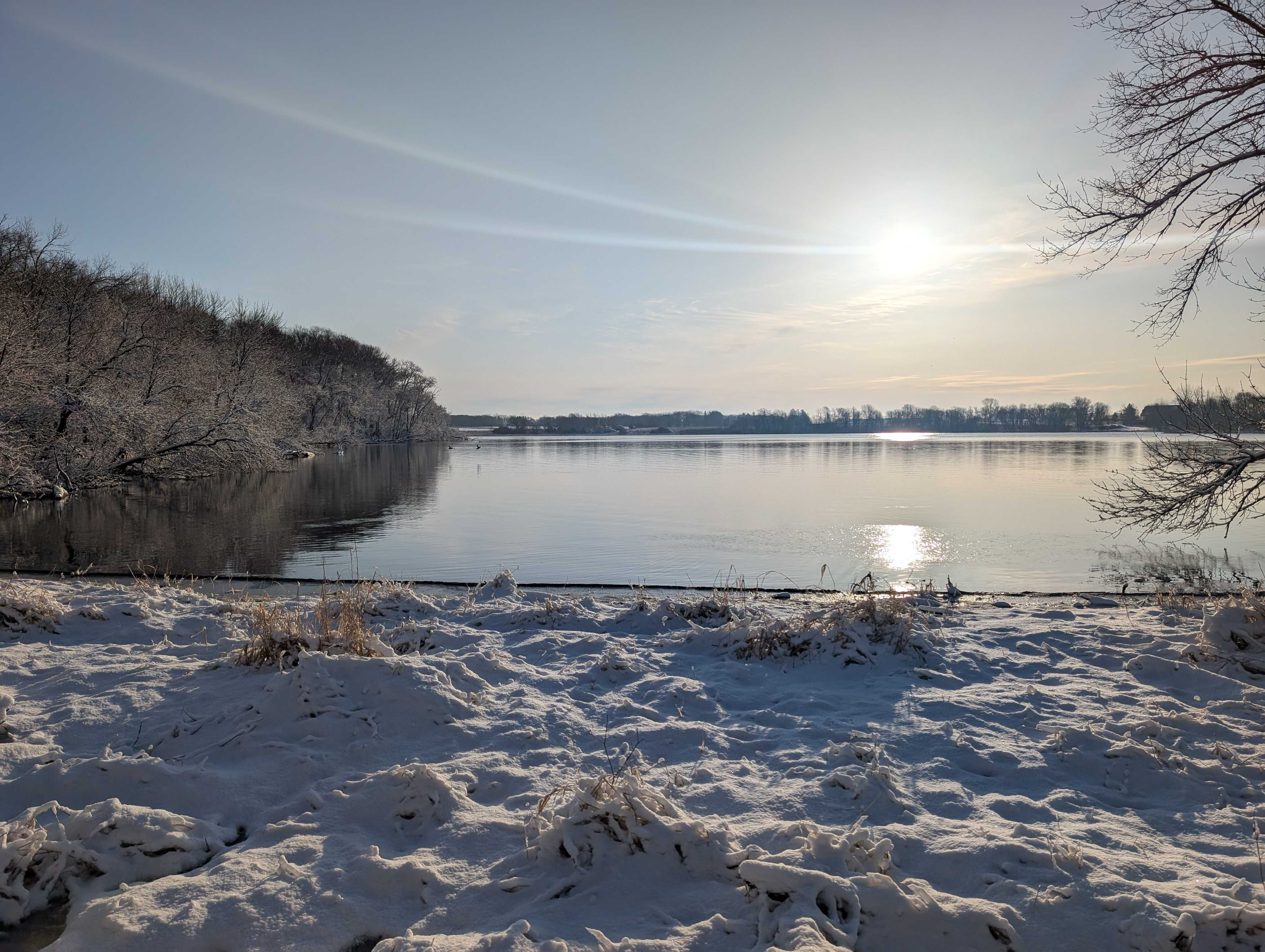
A view of a bay on Albert Lea Lake from the southernmost tip of Big Island

In the early 1960s a campground was added, but Big Island was too small to support much visitation. When it was announced that Interstates 90 and 35 would intersect near Albert Lea, a new local organization began pushing for more land to be added to the park. An additional area of 839 acres (340 ha) on the mainland was authorized in 1963. In 1974 a real estate company acquired for development a 560-acre (230 ha) tract northeast of the park, which included lakeshore and the esker. Again strong local support was the driving force in adding this land to the park, overcoming legal and financial constraints over a two-year advocacy.

Owen Johnson donated his collection of Native American surface artifacts to the park in 1972. They are housed in the Owen Johnson Interpretive Center at the park entrance, where they are available for research but are not currently on public display. In 1990 the park's previous names were combined into the new official moniker, Myre-Big Island State Park.

== Recreation ==
- Boating:
  - Boat ramp on Little Island.
  - Rental canoes available.
  - Boat tours of Albert Lea Lake embark from town.
- Camping:
  - Big Island Campground: 34 wooded sites (17 with electrical hookups), 1 camper cabin.
  - White Fox Campground: 59 open sites (15 electrical).
  - Little Island Pioneer Group Camp: 50 person capacity, tenting only.
  - New York Point Group Camp: Tent or vehicle camping with access to kitchen/mess hall & showers/restrooms.
  - 4 backpacking sites.
- Fishing: Black bullhead, carp, northern pike, and various panfish in Albert Lea Lake.
- Trails: 16 miles (26 km) of hiking, 7 miles (11 km) of mountain biking, 8 miles (13 km) of cross-country skiing, and 7 miles (11 km) of snowmobiling trails.
  - Blazing Star State Trail: 6.5 miles (10.5 km) of paved, multi-use trail begin in Frank Hall Park in Albert Lea and end near the esker. The trail is planned to extend 20 miles (32 km) to Austin, Minnesota.
- Lake is too shallow and weedy for swimming.

== Sources ==
- Arthur, Anne. Minnesota's State Parks. Adventure Publications, Inc.: Cambridge, MN, 1998.
- Bewer, Tim. Moon Handbooks: Minnesota. Avalon Travel Publishing: Emeryville, CA, 2004.
- Meyer, Roy W. Everyone's Country Estate: A History of Minnesota's State Parks. Minnesota Historical Society Press: St. Paul, 1991.
- Minnesota Department of Natural Resources. 2006. The Minnesota Department of Natural Resources Web Site (online).
