= Hay Creek (Mississippi River tributary) =

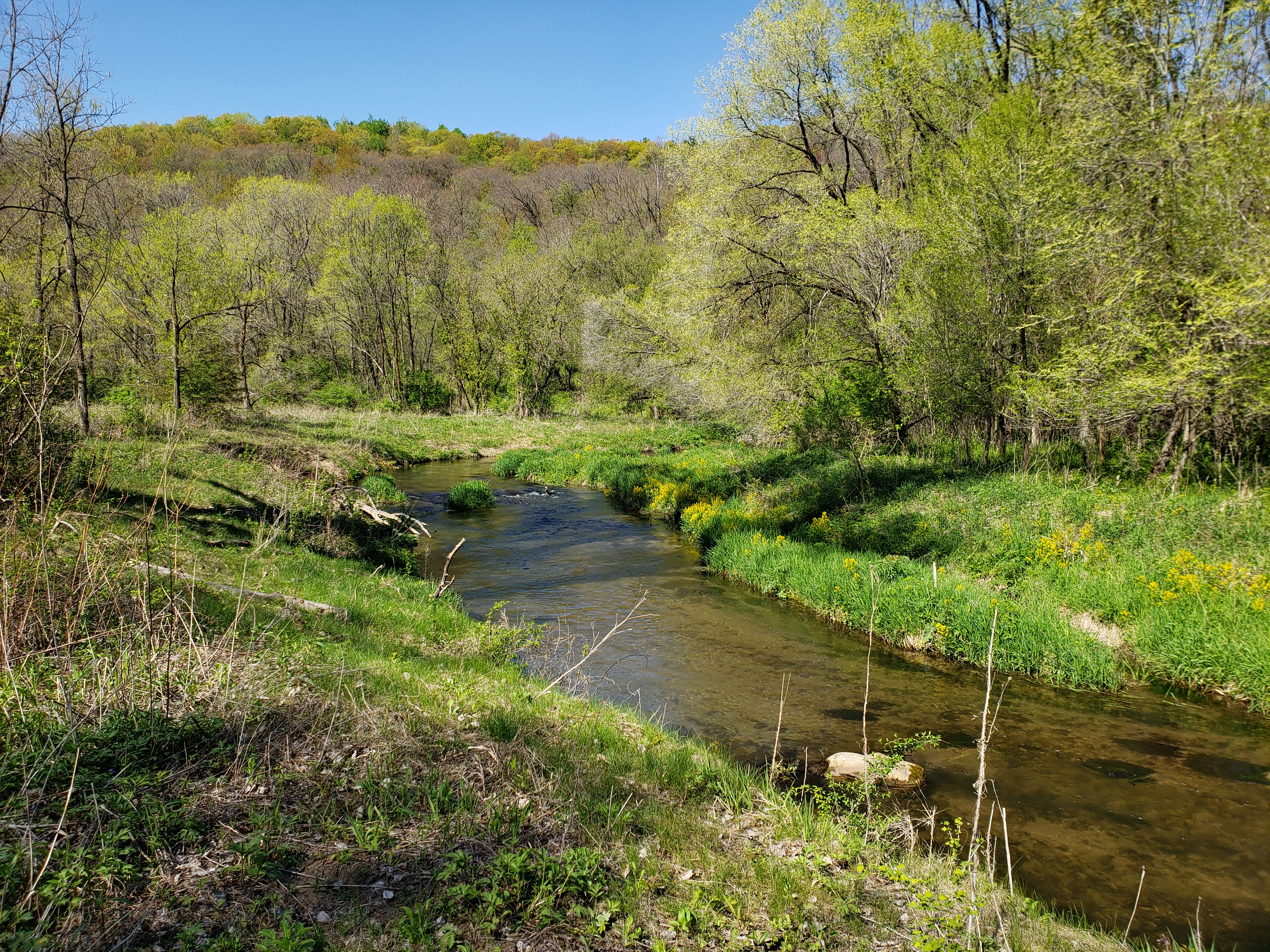
- Hay Creek in May 2021

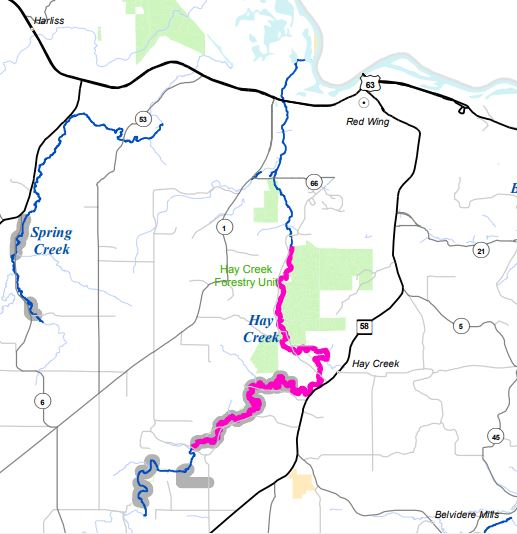
- Hay Creek and nearby Spring Creek

- Mouth of Hay Creek
- Native name: Ḣemnic̣aƞ Wakpadaƞ (Dakota)

Location
- Country: United States
- State: Minnesota
- County: Goodhue

Physical characteristics
- Source
  - coordinates: 44.4099661°N 92.6935281°W
- Mouth
  - location: Red Wing, Minnesota
  - coordinates: 44.5735787°N 92.5535244°W
- Length: 25.1 mi (40.4 km)

Basin features
- River system: Upper Mississippi River

Hay Creek is a small trout stream in southeastern Minnesota. It has its headwaters west of Goodhue and empties into the Mississippi River just to the north of Red Wing. It runs 25.1 miles (40.4 km). Hay Creek was named for the hay meadows near its banks. Its older Dakota name is Ḣemnic̣aƞ Wakpadaƞ, which can be translated as "Hill-Water-Wood Creek" - a reference to Ḣemnic̣aƞ-Barn Bluff near the mouth of the creek. or A railroad once ran along Hay Creek from the claybanks near Goodhue to the pottery and stoneware factories in Red Wing, which also made use of the water from the creek. The railroad was torn up in 1937, but traces such as trestle pilings remain.

== Habitat ==
Historically, Hay Creek was home to Brook trout and other species, which were depopulated due to farming practices in the late 18th and 19th centuries. In the mid-1970s, the Minnesota Department of Natural Resources started focusing on restoring Hay Creek. By 1976, over half of the length of Hay Creek is a Minnesota designated trout stream. Like the Vermillion River, Hay Creek receives extensive fishing pressure due to its proximity to Minneapolis–St. Paul. Minnesota Trout Unlimited has joined the restoration efforts along Hay Creek.

== See also ==
- List of rivers of Minnesota
