= Carley State Park =

State park in Minnesota

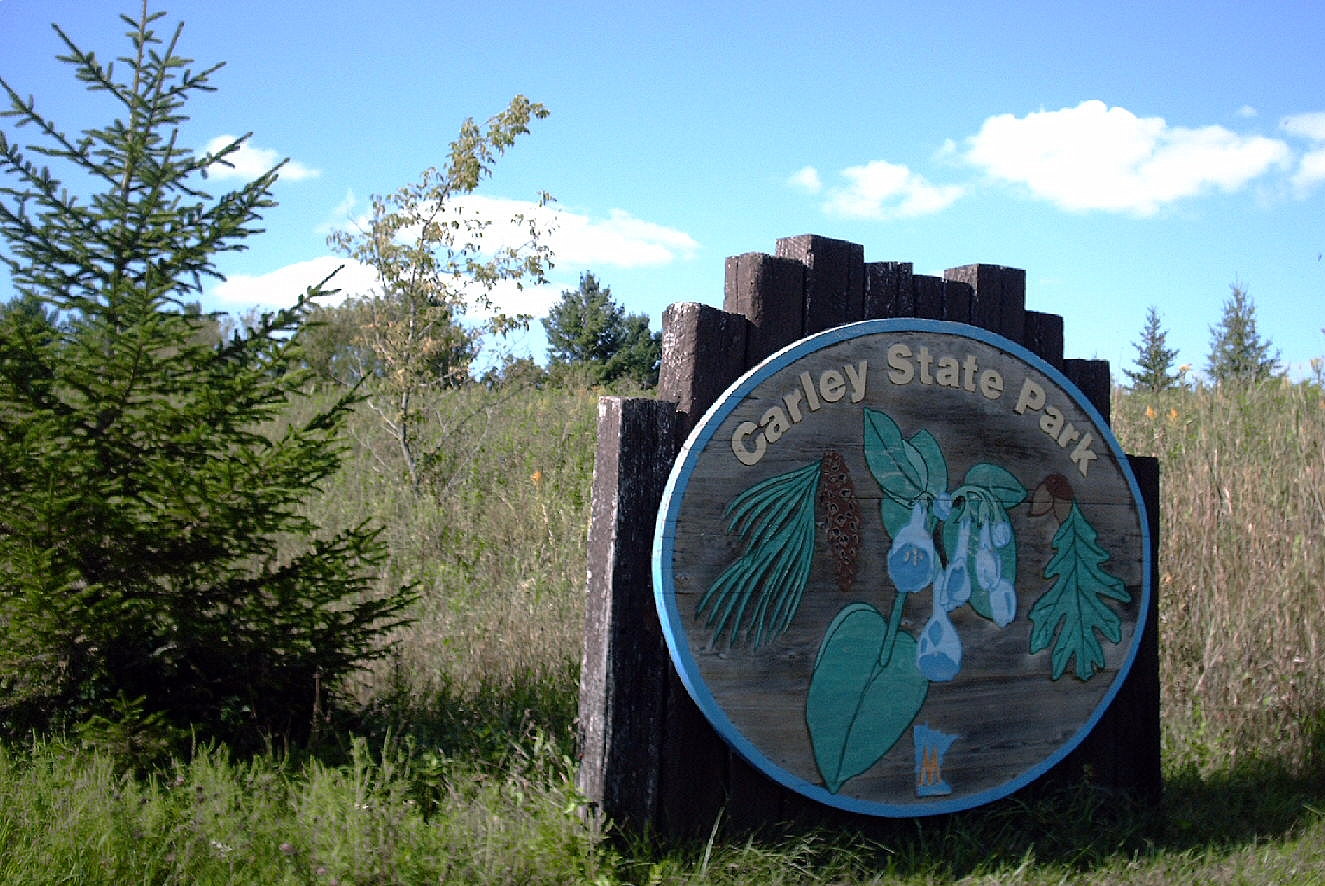
- Carley State Park entrance

- Location within Minnesota Location within the United States
- Location: Wabasha, Minnesota, United States
- Coordinates: 44°6′59″N 92°10′33″W
- Area: 209 acres (85 ha)
- Elevation: 1,037 ft (316 m)
- Established: 1949
- Governing body: Minnesota Department of Natural Resources

Carley State Park is a state park of Minnesota, United States, about 15 miles (24 km) northeast of Rochester and about 2 miles (3.2 km) south of Plainview in Wabasha County. It is used for picnics, camping, hiking, and other outdoor recreation. It is known for the bluebell flowers that bloom there every spring.

It is located in the Driftless Area of Minnesota. This is an area that escaped glaciation during the last ice age, i.e. the Wisconsinian glaciation.

== Geology ==
Beginning 450 million years ago, a shallow sea covered much of North America, including what is now southeastern Minnesota. Layers of sediment, hundreds of feet thick, were deposited on the sea bed and became cemented together to form the limestone bedrock. Although this area was not covered by the last glaciers, the effect of that period on the landscape is striking. Glacial action caused the formation of huge amounts of powdered rock and fine particles from its constant grinding. These fine particles, blown by the wind after the retreat of the glacier, were deposited over southeastern Minnesota in a thick blanket of soil known as loess. The surrounding rich farmland is a testament to the benefits of this soil type.

== Wildlife ==
The park's hardwood forest and adjacent agricultural land is home to mammalian species of white-tailed deer, two species of fox, beavers, and coyotes. Birds that inhabit here are pileated woodpeckers, great horned owls, and many migratory songbirds.

== Cultural history ==
Dakota Native Americans once hunted, farmed and gathered wild food in and around the Whitewater River Valley. They gave the Whitewater River its name because the river turned a murky white color in the spring as high water eroded the light colored clay of the valley floor. In 1851, the United States government and the Dakota tribe signed a treaty that opened most of southern Minnesota for European settlers. The nearest settlement to the park, Plainview, was named for the large, upland fields of prairie grass that surrounded the river valley. The land for the park was donated to the State of Minnesota in 1948 by State Senator James A. Carley and the Ernestina Bolt family in hopes of preserving an outstanding grove of native white pines. In 1957, a severe hailstorm ravaged the trees. The stand of white pines towers in the steep, rugged valley of the Whitewater River, opposite the picnic area, and can be seen from the trail observation platform.
