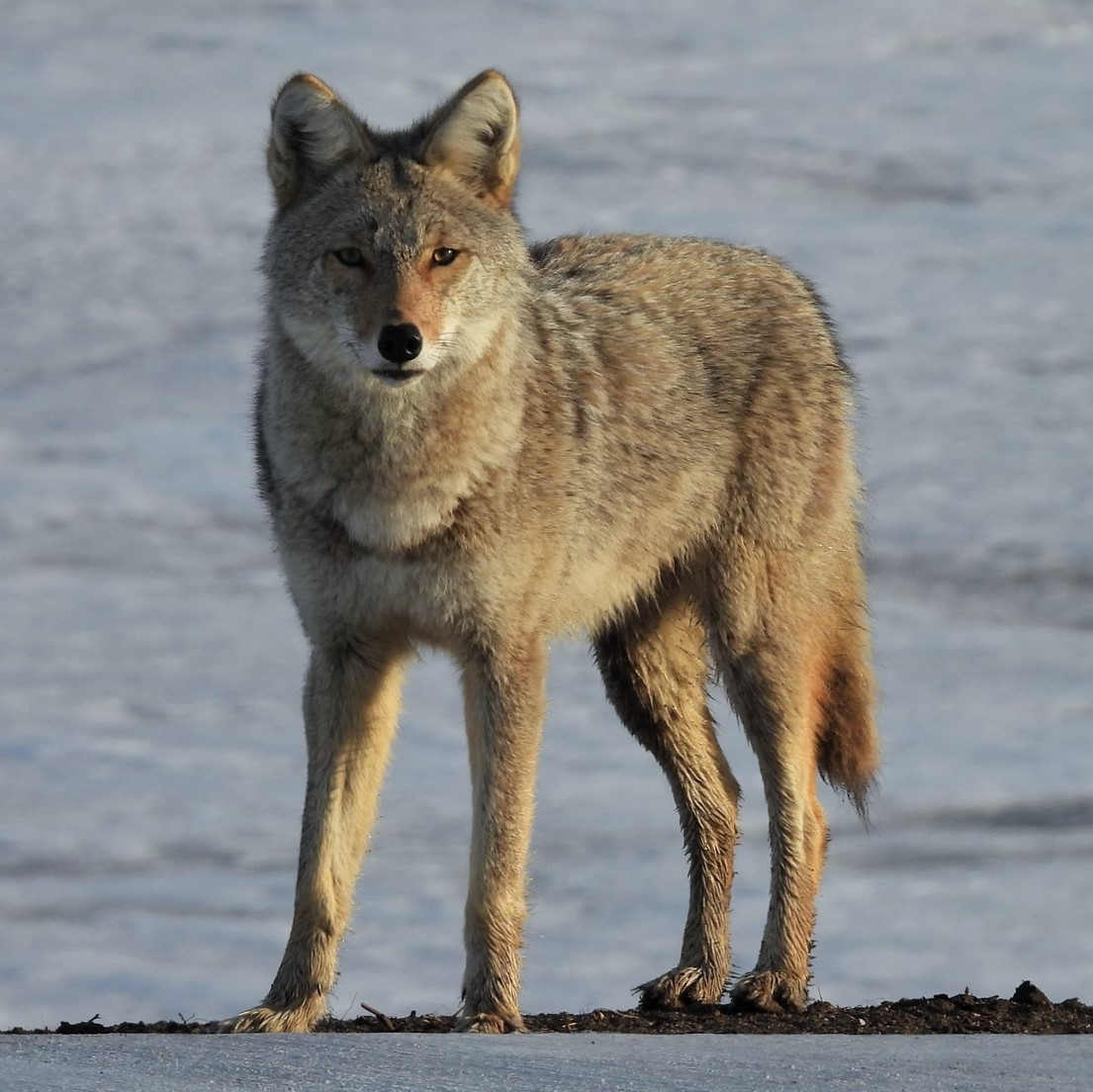
- Northeastern coyote in Thunder Bay, Ontario, Canada

Scientific classification
- Kingdom: Animalia
- Phylum: Chordata
- Class: Mammalia
- Infraclass: Placentalia
- Order: Carnivora
- Family: Canidae
- Genus: Canis
- Species: C. latrans
- Subspecies: C. l. thamnos

Trinomial name
- Canis latrans thamnos Jackson, 1949

= Northeastern coyote =

Subspecies of carnivore

The northeastern coyote (Canis latrans thamnos) is a subspecies of coyote native to most of the Midwestern United States, the eastern Canadian Prairies, and Central Canada. Historically, it ranged within the prairies of the Midwest, but has expanded its range, which now includes most of the Great Lakes region.

== Taxonomy ==
The northeastern coyote was described by Hartley H.T. Jackson in 1949. This subspecies was one of the first encountered by European settlers, and was named the "brush wolf" by these settlers due to the habitat where it was inhabited. The trinomial name thamnos derived from the Greek θάμνος, which means "brush, shrub".

== Description ==
Being one of the easternmost coyote subspecies, it is one of the largest subspecies. In body length, northeastern coyotes range from 110 to 130 cm (43.3 to 51.1 in), and in Minnesota average 120 cm (47.2 in).

Typically, a male northeastern coyote from the Greater Toronto Area or a surrounding region weighs 14.5 kg (31.9 lb). Male coyotes from northern Minnesota average 12.5 kg (27.5 lb), while the general female from the area average 11.5 kg (25.3 lb). On average, coyotes from Iowa regularly weigh 13 kg (28.6 lb) and females 11.4 kg (25.1 lb).

== Range ==
The northeastern coyote is one of the subspecies of coyote whose range has expanded the most. It was originally found in the prairies of the Midwestern United States but significantly expanded its range once logging and farming grew across the areas where it was expanding and the cougar and eastern wolf were extirpated from these areas. Coyotes were found observed in Ontario in 1919, and started to inhabit northwestern Ohio around 1930. By 1988, northeastern coyotes had expanded into Tennessee and began to roam the western portion of the state with southeastern coyotes.
