= North Shore (Lake Superior) =

Geographic region in the United States and Canada

Coordinates: 47°39′N 90°40′W

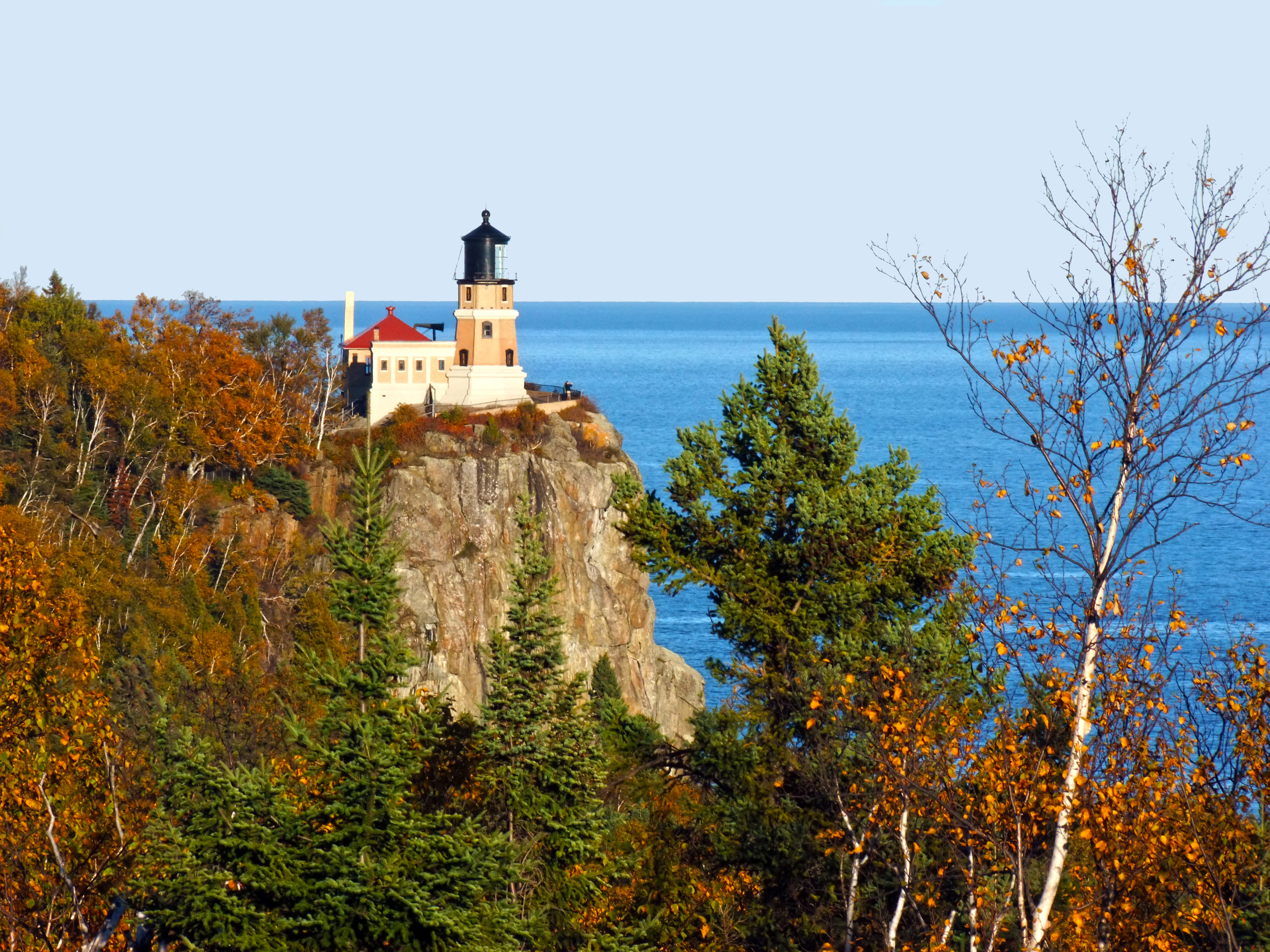
Split Rock Lighthouse on the North Shore of Lake Superior in a Minnesota state park nine miles southwest of Silver Bay.

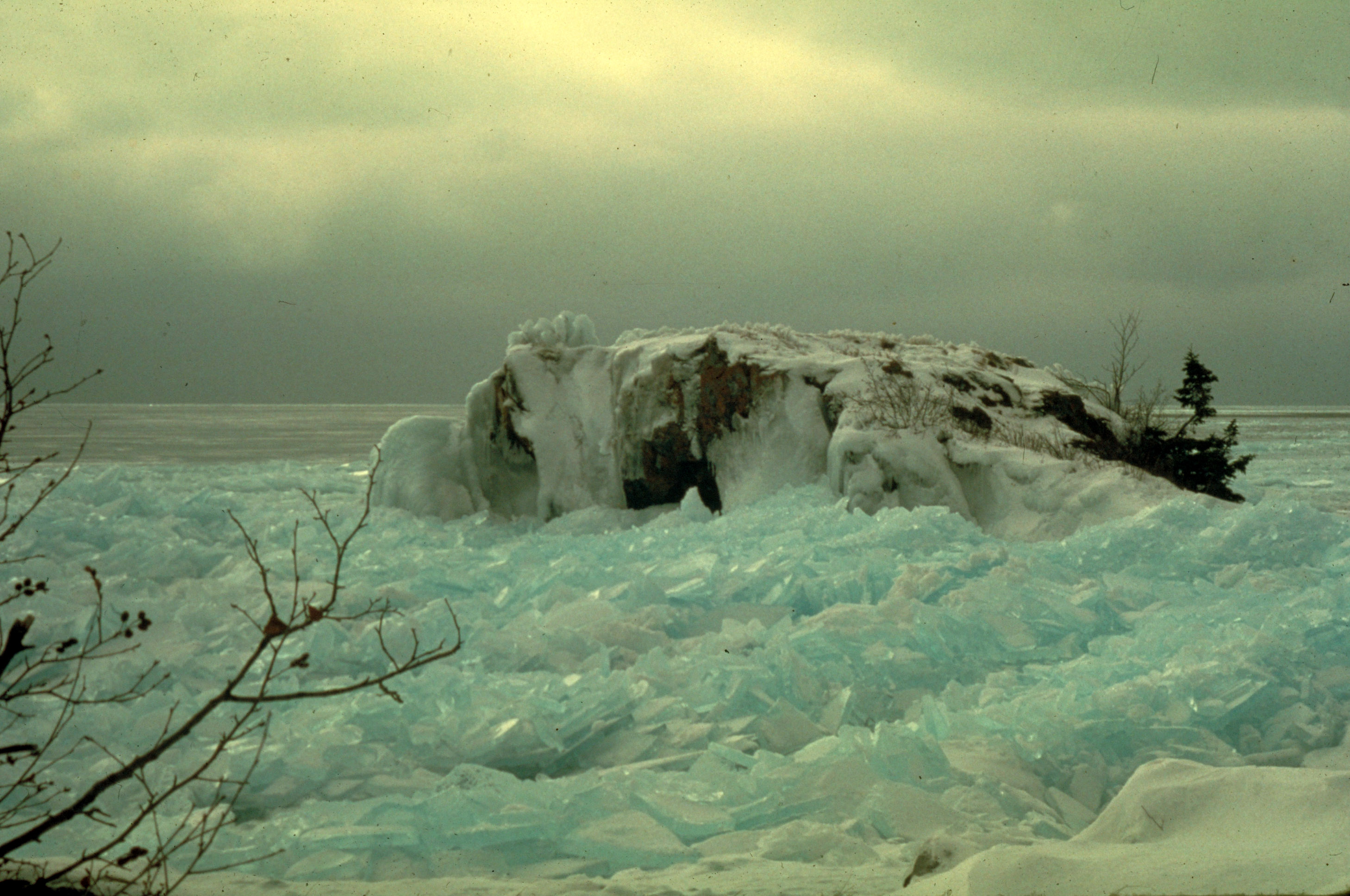
Winter along the North Shore

The North Shore of Lake Superior runs from Duluth, Minnesota, United States, at the western end of the lake, to Thunder Bay and Nipigon, Ontario, Canada, in the north, to Sault Ste. Marie, Ontario in the east. The shore is characterized by alternating rocky cliffs and cobblestone beaches, with forested hills and ridges through which scenic rivers and waterfalls descend as they flow to Lake Superior.

== History ==
=== Pre-colonization ===
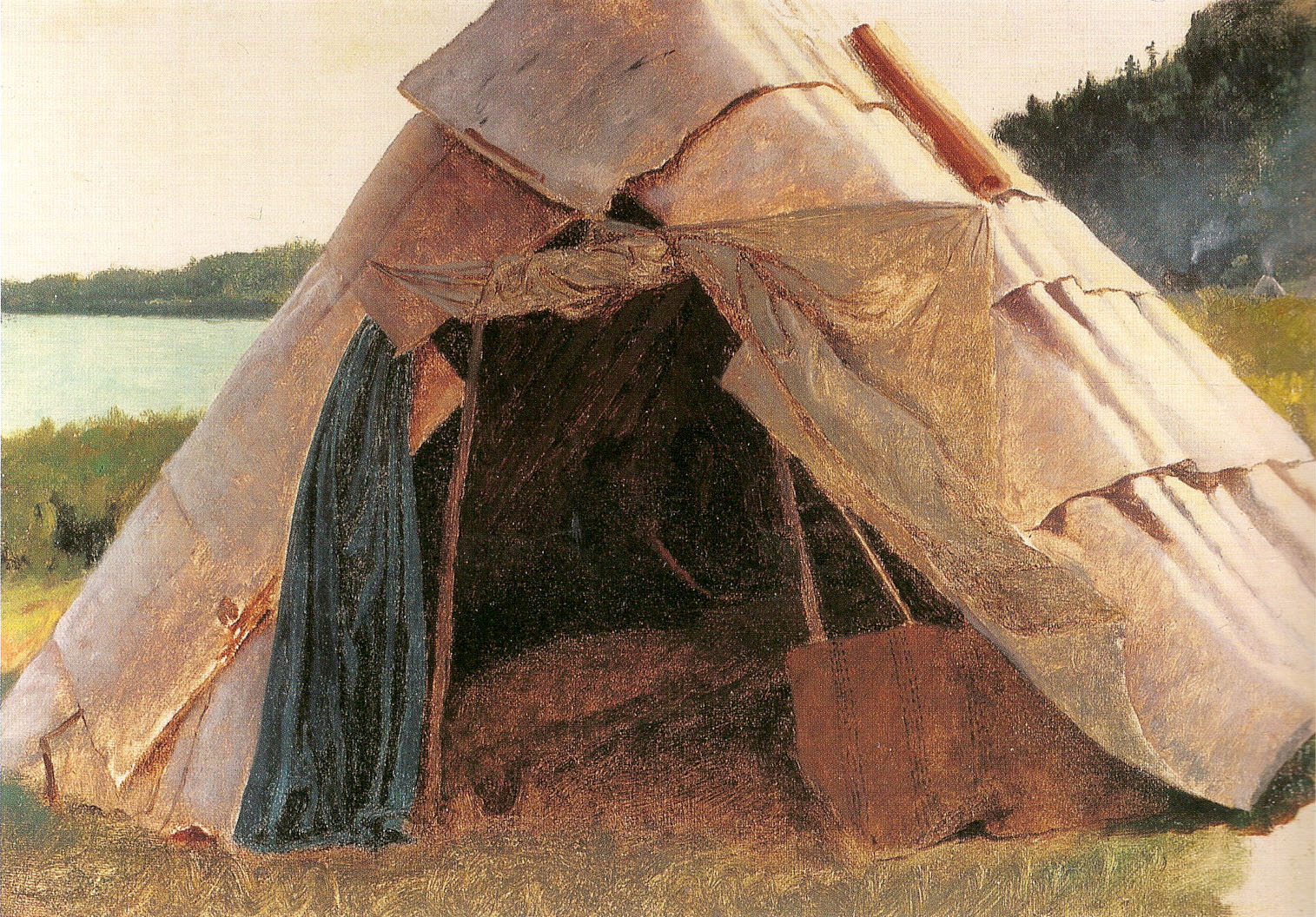
Ojibwe Wigwam at Grand Portage painted by Eastman Johnson in 1857

Lake Superior was settled by Native Americans about 8000 BC when the Wisconsin Glaciers began to recede. By 500 BC the Laurel people had established settlements in the area and had begun to trade metal with other native peoples. The Laurel people were animists and probably created many of the pictographs present on rock faces along the North Shore and other Canadian rock faces in order to communicate with spirits.

In the 12th century, on the easternmost portion of the North Shore, the ancestors of the Ojibwa migrated into the area. These people left behind small pits dug in the ground which archaeologists now call Pukaskwa Pits. On the Minnesota portion of the North Shore there are only three archaeological sites, and it is not known who dug them.

By the 18th century the Ojibwa had settled the length of the North Shore approximately as far as the modern Canadian–Minnesota Border. The Minnesota portion of the North Shore was settled mostly by the Cree and the Dakota lived to the south.

=== Fur trade ===
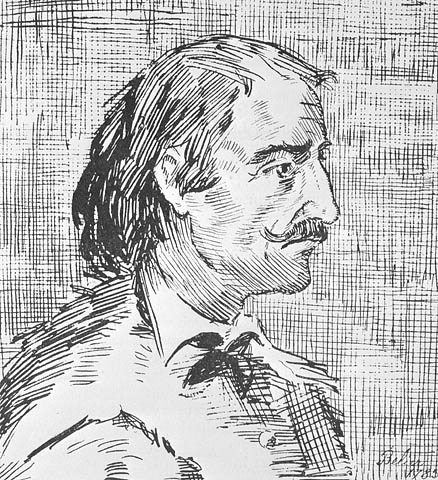
Pierre-Esprit Radisson

The first white explorer to reach Lake Superior was Frenchman Étienne Brûlé who was sent out by Samuel de Champlain to search for the Northwest Passage in 1623 or 1624. His exploration allowed Champlain to create the first map of the lake in 1632.

Charles Raymbault and Isaac Jogues, Jesuit missionaries, were the next significant explorers, who tried to establish a more permanent missionary post further west but only got as far as Sault Ste. Marie. In 1658 two French explorers, Pierre-Esprit Radisson and Médard des Groseilliers, became the first whites to circumnavigate Lake Superior by sailing south along the North Shore. When they returned, they brought a flotilla of Native Americans with fur pelts, beginning interest in the fur trade in the Lake Superior region.

Conflicts between native tribes began to escalate toward war during this period when an alliance of Anishinaabe tribes was formed and defeated the Dakota in a battle west of Sault Sainte Marie in 1662. This warfare between the tribes along Lake Superior prevented European trade in the area for several years.

In 1670, the Hudson's Bay Company was founded, which began the fur trade nonetheless. In the late 1670s, Daniel Greysolon, Sieur du Lhut, helped negotiate a more permanent peace between these tribes, thus providing safe trade across Lake Superior for the French. With this, the foundations for European settlement on the North Shore were laid. Fort Kaministiquia, around modern Thunder Bay, was established in 1683. In 1688 Jacques de Noyon became the first European to visit the present-day Boundary Waters Canoe Area region west of Lake Superior.

A war between Britain and France, followed by a sharp drop in fur prices, slowed exploration for several decades. In 1732 the French-Canadian La Vérendrye built Fort St. Pierre on Rainy Lake near the head of the Rainy River in order to gain access to the west.

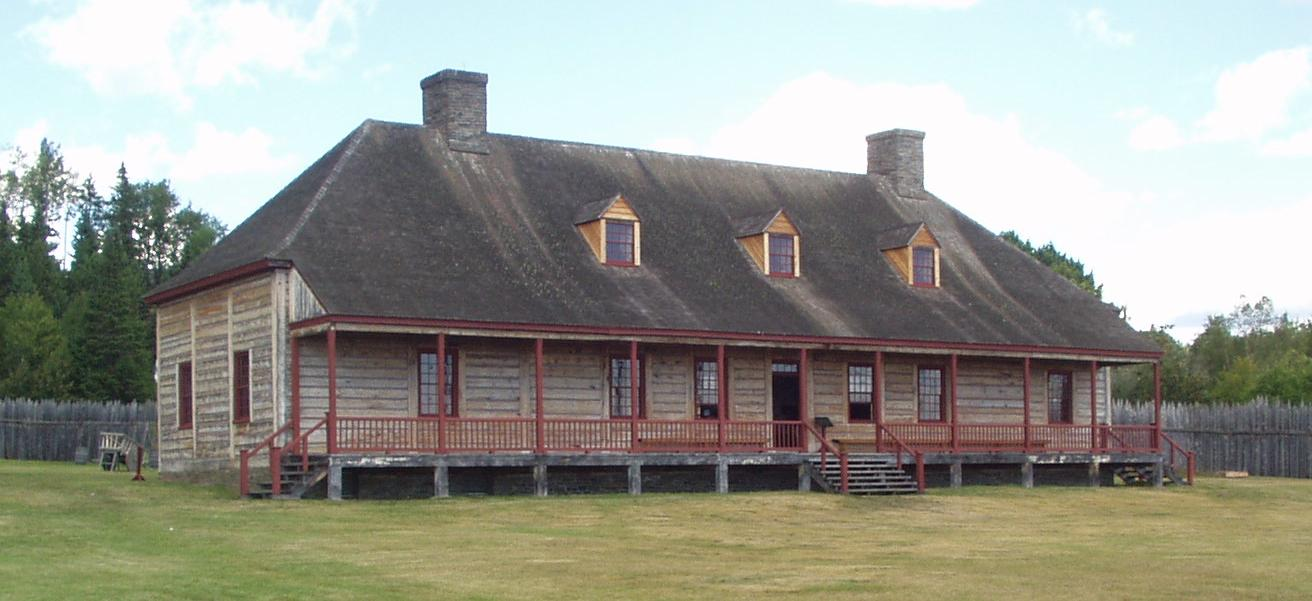
The Great Hall at Grand Portage

In 1763 according to the terms of the Treaty of Paris, the British took possession of all French holdings east of the Mississippi River, including the North Shore. In 1784 the North West Company, the newly organized rival to the Hudson's Bay Company, started moving traders into its new fort at Grand Portage. With new headquarters on the North Shore, the North West Company began to build 40 new forts and ports all along the North Shore and northern Minnesota. In 1821 the North West Company was forced to merge with the Hudson's Bay Company.

With the eventual depletion of fur-bearing animals, the fur trade and associated settlement diminished.

=== Early American settlement ===
When American settlers moved westward, the governments of the United States and Britain began to dispute the border between the territory that would become Minnesota and the territory which would become Ontario in future years. Many geologic surveys were taken because of these disputes, which revealed the rich mineral resources in this area. In 1854 the LaPointe Treaty surrendered all Ojibwa lands to the United States government.

Because of this white settlers moved into the region in order to mine the natural resources, thus beginning American settlements on the Minnesotan portion of the North Shore. Land claims were made near modern Duluth, Knife River, Beaver Bay, Buchanan, Burlington Bay, French River, Stewart River and Silver Creek. Ninety-nine fishermen had settled in northern Minnesota by 1857, when an economic panic caused most of the claims to be abandoned. In 1865 the Vermilion Lake Gold Rush brought a new wave of settlement to the North Shore.

American settlement began in earnest in 1869. When the Lake Superior & Mississippi Railroad was built, people could move across the country in days instead of months. In 1869 Duluth grew from 14 families in January to a population of 3,500 in July. Construction on the Duluth Harbor was begun to allow steamboat shipping between Duluth, Buffalo, Detroit, and Chicago. The town of Beaver Bay was founded in 1869 as a fishing community, and Grand Marais was founded by Henry Mayhew and Sam Howenstine in 1871. Another panic in 1873 put an end to this growth, and Duluth shrank to a population of 1,300.

In the 1880s, growth began again in Minnesota, and significant growth began for the first time in Canada. The Canadian Pacific Railway was opened in 1881 and brought a wave of settlers from the west. In Minnesota, Two Harbors was founded and became a major iron ore port and a source of labor for the inland iron mines on the North Shore. Besides mining, fishing became the other major industry of North Shore communities. In 1885, 195 commercial fishermen lived in Duluth. Duluth fish catches increased to a peak of 10,000 tons of fish caught in 1915. It has since declined. Current annual fish catches have fallen to under 1,000 tons per year.

=== Iron industry ===
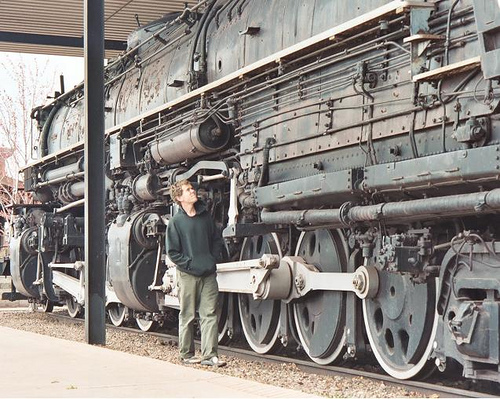
A tourist views one of the 2-8-8-4 locomotives that hauled iron ore to Two Harbors. This engine is preserved in Two Harbors next to the Lake County Historical Society building (the old train depot).

In 1875 Philadelphia financier Charlemagne Tower, who owned extensive interests in the Northern Pacific Railroad, began to investigate the possibility of iron mining inland from the North Shore. (Vast quantities of banded iron formations had been deposited about 2,000 million years ago in the Animikie Group.) Although the scare of 1873 had depressed the price of iron to $5.50 per ton, by the 1880s it was back to about $9.25 per ton. Tower started acquiring land in the Vermilion Range, where ore had an iron content of 69%. Tower also acquired the rights to the Duluth Iron & Railway Co., which entitled him to 10 square miles (26 km^{2}) of land for every mile (1.6 km) of rail built between Duluth and Agate Bay (Two Harbors), 25 miles (40 km) northeast along the shore.

Speculators bought up land at Agate Bay; the rail line was not completed until 1887, so all travel to Agate Bay was originally by steamboat. Between 1884 and 1885 two large wooden loading docks were built in the harbor for shipping iron. In 1887, when the railroad was completed, the Minnesota Iron Company owned 95.7 miles (154.0 km) of track, 26,800 acres (108 km^{2}) of property, 13 locomotives, 340 cars, the loading docks at Two Harbors and five pit mines.

This growth attracted the interest of Henry H. Porter, a Chicago railroad owner. He bought 25,000 acres (100 km^{2}) of land further up the North Shore than Tower’s holdings around Two Harbors and Tower, an inland mining settlement named after its founder. Porter coerced Tower into selling the Minnesota Iron Company for 8.5 million dollars. He opened Chandler Mine, Pioneer Mine, Zenith Mine, Savoy Mine and Sibley Mine between 1889 and 1899. In 1896 the iron traveling through Two Harbors exceeded 2,000,000 tons. Two Harbors steadily built more docks and replaced the wooden docks with concrete over the course of the next several decades.

Iron production continued steadily for many more decades; by the 1950s traditional iron mines had exhausted most of their resources. It had been known for many years that northern Minnesota had an ore called taconite, which could be refined into iron through a process called beneficiation. A taconite processing plant was built further north along the North Shore at Silver Bay, and it quickly became the major taconite shipping port. Minnesota taconite produces over half of the iron mined in Minnesota at the present date.

=== Lumber industry ===
Northern Minnesota is essentially covered with one large forest. Although the potential for a lumber industry was recognized early in the course of European settlement, the distances that it would have to be shipped made it uneconomical. But as eastern forests were logged out, the lumber industry moved into Wisconsin and Minnesota. Lumber and forest products were shipped by rail from Duluth and Superior, Wisconsin to southern and eastern mills. Because of conservation efforts, many of the forests along the North Shore are now protected from deforestation, but there is still a strong paper industry that relies on pulpwood.

=== Tourism ===
In 1855 when a lock system first allowed steamboats onto the lake, eastern tourists began to travel onto Lake Superior for recreational purposes. They would then canoe or be ferried from Duluth up the North Shore and would stay in hunting and fishing camps.

In the 1920s, the North Shore highway was built, which helped make the North Shore accessible by land. At the same time commercial fishermen began to go out of business as catches declined. Many of these fishermen built cabins and resorts, which were inhabited by more rich people on recreational trips. Certain exclusive clubs also bought land for resort and sport purposes. The Naniboujou Club Lodge was built to attract an exclusive clientele, and a group of Duluth businessmen, the Tettegouche Club, bought 9,346 acres (37.8 km^{2}) of land for use as a private retreat.

During the early 20th century, the government decided that continued exploitation of the North Shore would destroy it. In 1909 President Teddy Roosevelt organized the Superior National Forest, putting over 3-million acres (12,000 km^{2}) of the forests between the North Shore and the Canada–US border under protection. The government of Minnesota slowly began to acquire the lands which became the modern North Shore state parks. The first park to be formally organized was Jay Cooke State Park in 1915. In the 1930s the Civilian Conservation Corps established several camps organized along the North Shore and built rustic structures in what would become several North Shore state parks.

Today the North Shore Scenic Drive remains a popular tourist route, starting at the historic Glensheen Mansion, passing several state parks, all the way to Grand Portage.

== Geology ==
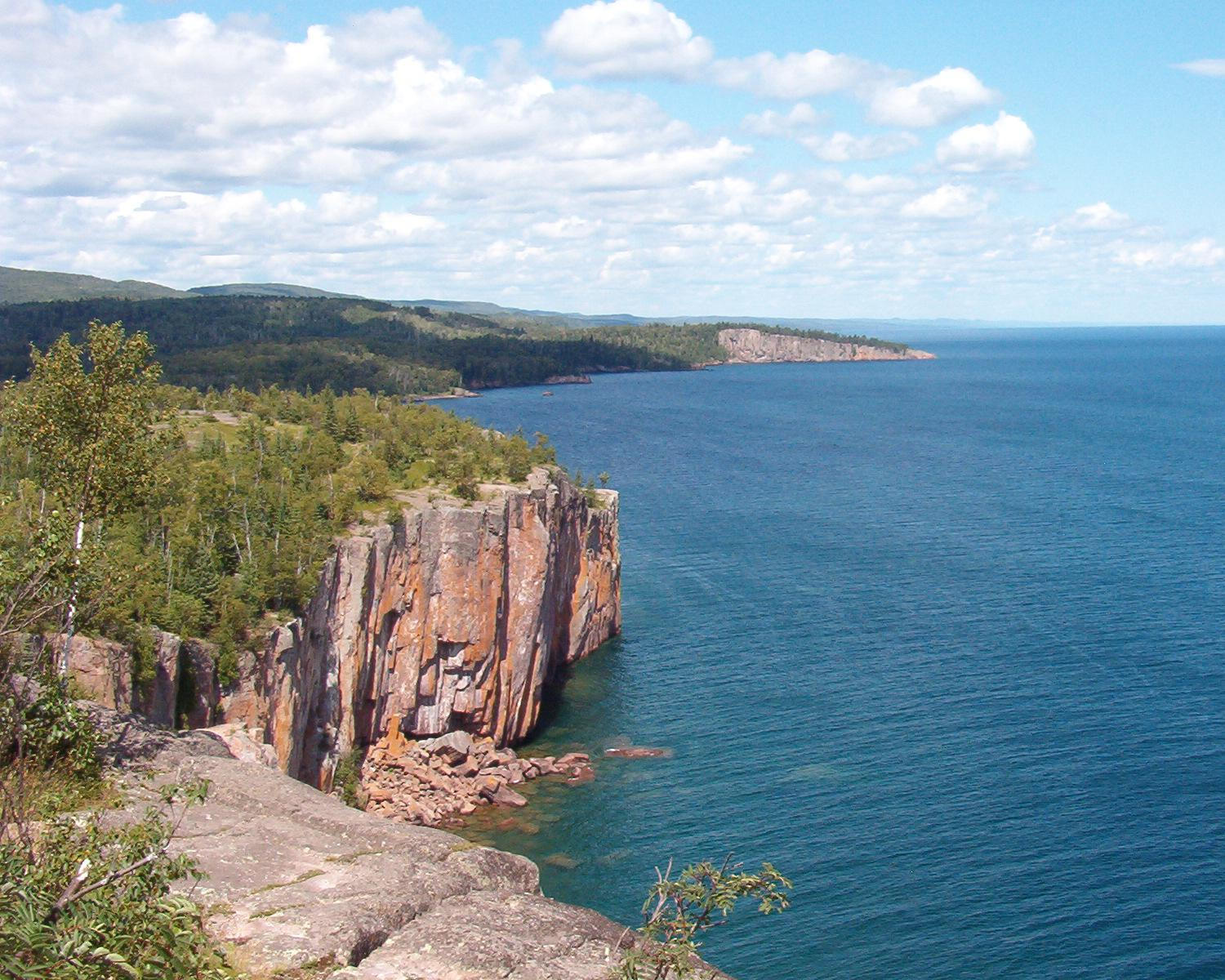
Cliffs at Palisade Head near Silver Bay, Minnesota looking northeast to Shovel Point; both were formed from lava flows from the Midcontinent Rift.

The North Shore lies on the north side of the Midcontinent Rift System which ran 1,300 miles (2,000 km) northwest from southern Michigan, through what is now Lake Superior, and south-southwest into Kansas. As the granitic crust was torn apart by continental drift, lava flowed out from 30–60 miles (50–100 km) under the crust and formed basalt. Tectonic forces were not strong enough to continue to separate the two sides of the continental rift; when the rifting stopped, the lava cooled and the heavy crust sank and was filled with sediment.

During recent glaciations, a large amount of the basalt and sandstone, which erode much more easily than granite, was removed by the glaciers. This formed the rough, rugged shoreline on the North Shore today. As the glaciers retreated, they left behind eroded igneous material, much of which covers the rocky beaches on the North Shore. The Wisconsin side of the basin and the bottom of the basin filled with the residue from the eroded sandstone and thus are sandy beaches today.

The melting water from the retreat of the glaciers ran into the basin and began to fill, forming the Great Lakes. The shoreline at its maximum reached over 500 feet (150 m) above its current height, and at its minimum fell to 250 feet (75 m) below its current level. When the levels of Lake Michigan and Lake Huron fell 2,000 years ago, it created rapids at Sault Sainte Marie, which restricted the release of water from Lake Superior and brought the shoreline to its present level.

The modern shoreline is composed of basalt lava flows. In the south, near Duluth, other materials, such as slate, greywacke and sandstone, are found a short distance inland; but in the north, the entire bedrock made of basalt and gabbro is exposed in patches miles from shore. When the bedrock hits the surface of the lake at a shallow enough angle, the beach is covered with washed up rocks. When it hits the lake at a steep angle, it breaks off and makes sharp cliffs ending at the lake.

== Attractions ==
=== Minnesota ===
- Duluth
- Highway 61 and the North Shore Scenic Drive
- Glensheen Mansion
- Two Harbors
- Superior National Forest
- Superior Hiking Trail
- Silver Bay
- Schroeder
- Tofte (home of the North Shore Commercial Fishing Museum)
- North Country Trail
- Grand Marais
- Gunflint Trail
- Lutsen Mountains ski resorts

==== State parks and national monument ====
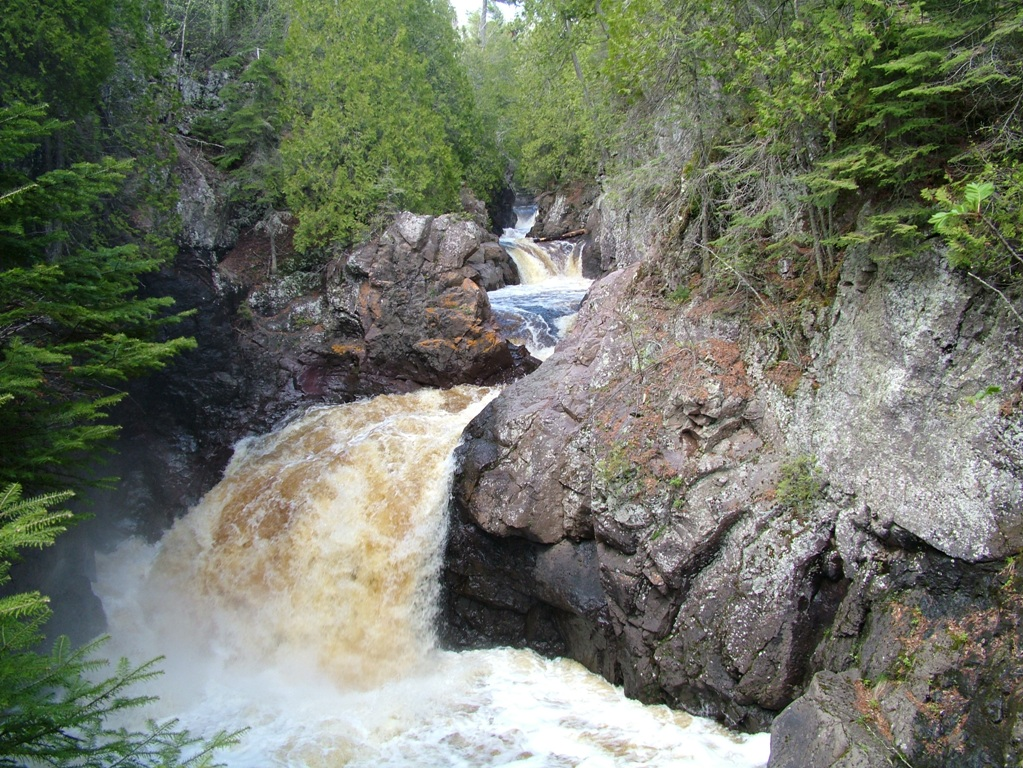
Cascade River State Park

To people who camp in the state parks along Minnesota's North Shore, the term North Shore refers to both the shore of the lake and all the rivers which run into the lake. Thus there are numerous "North Shore state parks," most of which are not actually on the lakeshore, and several of which are not even particularly close to it.

- Jay Cooke State Park is on the Saint Louis River, which enters into Lake Superior through the Duluth harbor several miles away.
- Gooseberry Falls State Park has campgrounds fairly close to Lake Superior, but its main attractions are the five falls on the Gooseberry River and the Gitchi Gummi Trail, which overlooks the north face of the river gorge.
- Split Rock Lighthouse State Park is popular for its historic Split Rock Lighthouse. Since the lighthouse is separately run by the Minnesota Historical Society, there is a separate fee for admittance.
- Tettegouche State Park lies at the base of the Baptism River and is famous for the high cliffs overlooking Lake Superior. Palisade Head, the highest cliff in Minnesota, is accessible outside the main entrance to the state park, although a slightly smaller area of lake cliffs, Shovel Point, is within the main park.
- George H. Crosby Manitou State Park is the only state park on Lake Superior to offer only backpacking campsites, all of which are on the Manitou River at some distance from the lakeshore.
- Temperance River State Park has camping very close to the shore of Superior. The main attractions are the falls on the Temperance River.
- Cascade River State Park is well known for the seven cascading waterfalls on the Cascade River.
- Judge C. R. Magney State Park is the northernmost place along Minnesota's North Shore where people can camp. It contains the Devil's Kettle waterfall on the Brule River. The river splits into two streams right before the waterfall, and one continues down the river while the other disappears into a hole in the rock face of the waterfall called the Kettle.
- Grand Portage State Park, which is near but not the same as Grand Portage National Monument, includes the High Falls on the Pigeon River which separates Minnesota and Ontario. Unlike every other state park on Minnesota's North Shore, there are no camping accommodations in this park.
- Grand Portage National Monument is home to a reconstruction of a historic fur trading post as well as traditional Ojibwa culture. There is no vehicle-accessible camping in the national monument.

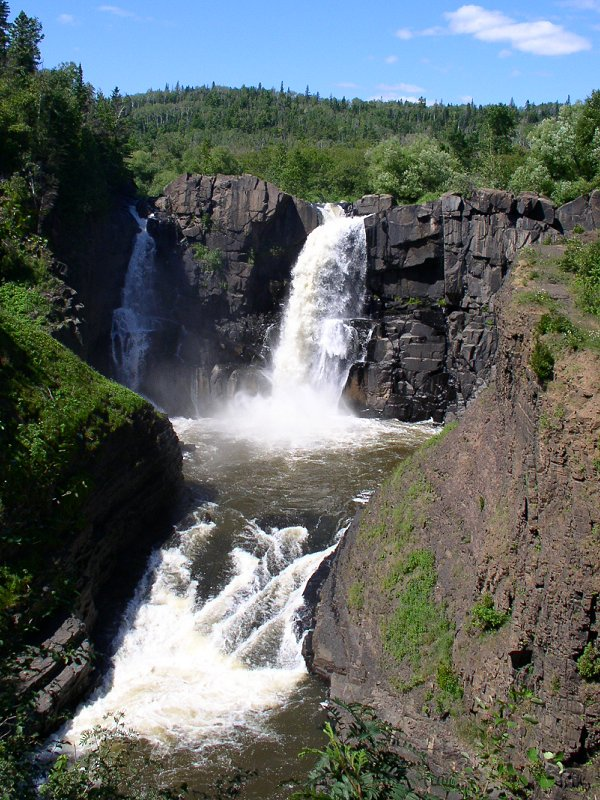
High Falls of the Pigeon River, Grand Portage State Park

=== Ontario ===
- Thunder Bay, Ontario
- Lake Nipigon
- Sault Ste. Marie, Ontario

==== Provincial and national parks ====
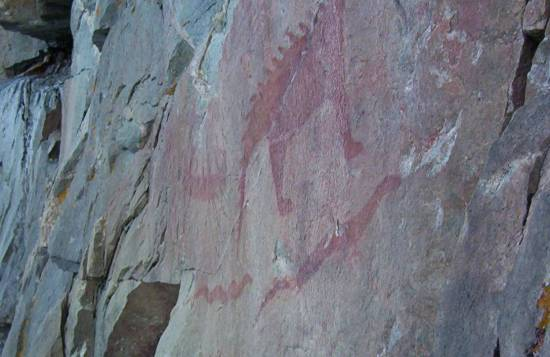
Pictographs at Lake Superior Provincial Park

The majority of Ontario Provincial Parks are undeveloped nature reserves with no formal campgrounds or visitor centers.

- Lake Superior National Marine Conservation Area is a 10,000 km² conservation area created in 2007.
- Pigeon River Provincial Park lies on the Canadian side of the Pigeon River.
- Sleeping Giant Provincial Park is a large natural environment park on the Sibley Peninsula which offers camping.
- Shesheeb Bay Provincial Park is a small nature reserve park on the Black Bay Peninsula.
- Gravel River Provincial Park is a small undeveloped nature reserve on the Gravel River running into Lake Superior.
- Rainbow Falls Provincial Park offers camping.
- Prairie River Mouth Provincial Park is a nature reserve park which is totally undeveloped except for one footpath.
- Neys Provincial Park is on a remote peninsula jutting into Lake Superior which offers camping.
- Red Sucker Point Provincial Park is a small nature reserve on the shore of Lake Superior.
- Lake Superior Provincial Park is by far the largest provincial park on the lakeshore. It is a natural environment park with full, modern camping facilities and many different inland trails.
- Montreal River Provincial Park is a nature reserve which is only accessible by boat.
- Pancake Bay Provincial Park is a recreation park with camping facilities. The location of the Edmund Fitzgerald shipwreck is near the park.
- Batchawana Bay Provincial Park is a recreation park on a rare sandy beach (most North Shore beaches are stone) with day use facilities.
- Pukaskwa National Park is the largest national park in Ontario. It has limited camping facilities.

== See also ==
- The South Shore of Lake Superior
- Isle Royale National Park, Michigan
- the Boundary Waters region, Minnesota-Ontario
