= Temperance River =

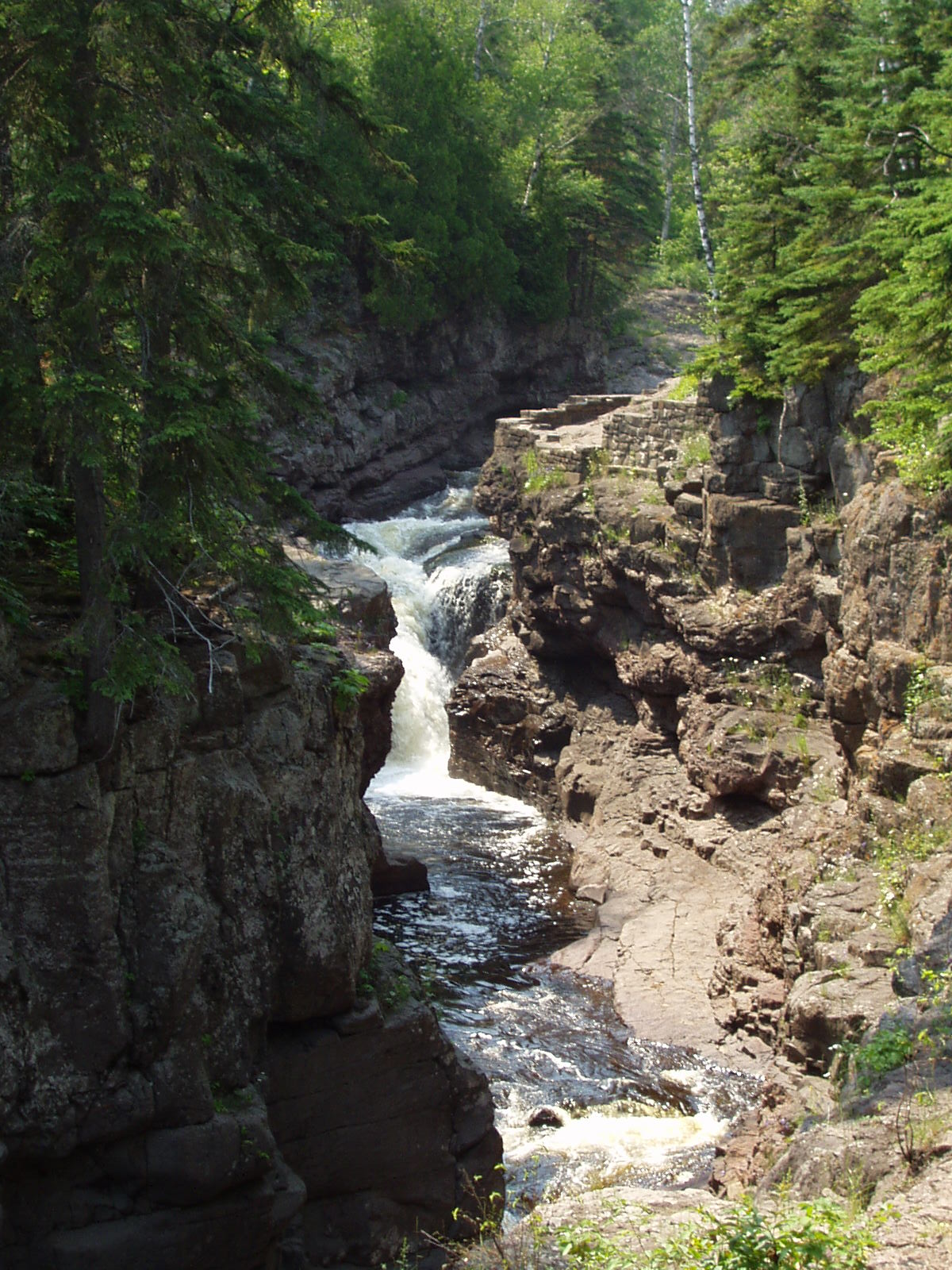
- Temperance River at Temperance River State Park

- Mouth of the Temperance River

Location
- Country: United States
- State: Minnesota
- County: Cook County

Physical characteristics
- Source
  - location: Brule Lake
  - coordinates: 47.9282453°N 90.7817286°W
- Mouth
  - location: Lake Superior
  - coordinates: 47.5532°N 90.8735°W
  - elevation: 697 ft (212 m)
- Length: 39 miles (63 km)
- Basin size: 198 square miles (510 km^{2})

The Temperance River is a 39.2-mile-long (63.1 km) river in northern Minnesota. It drains into Lake Superior along its north shore just south of Tofte. It flows out of Brule Lake in Cook County generally south towards its mouth within Temperance River State Park. Its name is supposedly a pun on its lack of a sand bar.

== Geography ==
The Temperance River flows 39 miles (63 km) between its source, Brule Lake, and its mouth. Brule Lake is unusual in that it has two outlets. The Temperance flows from its western outlet, and carries approximately half of the flow leaving the lake, while the South Brule River carries the other half from its eastern outlet. After leaving Brule Lake, the Temperance flows through a chain of smaller lakes for the upper half of its length. It shares this feature with its neighbors, the Cross, Poplar, and Cascade rivers, which gives it a warmer water temperature and more steady flow than streams further to the south. After this, it proceeds to flow directly over the bedrock which is entirely igneous, formed during the formation of the Keweenawan Rift. Near Lake Superior, the river has dug deep potholes into the bedrock, some of which connected to form a narrow gorge and a system of waterfalls. The depth of the water where the river enters the lake prevents the river from developing a sand bar at its mouth. The Temperance has a drainage basin of 198 square miles (510 km^{2}), which is the fourth largest catchment for a Minnesota river entering into Superior, after the Saint Louis River, Pigeon River, and Brule River.

== History ==
The Temperance River was named Kawimbash by the Ojibwa, meaning "deep hollow river". While it retained this name in the earliest geological surveys, Thomas Clark reported its present name in 1864, which he alleged arose as a pun from the fact that the river has no sand bar near its mouth. However, this is not the only river on Lake Superior to have this feature, which has cast some doubt on that story.

The Temperance River is located within the Superior National Forest, and its upper portions are within the Boundary Waters Canoe Area Wilderness, thus it remains largely undeveloped. The only two major developments in the immediate vicinity of the river are Minnesota State Highway 61 and Temperance River State Park. Highway 61 was built by Minnesota's state highway department beginning in 1926, and was completely paved by 1940. During this time the highway department acquired 200 acres (0.81 km^{2}) of land at the mouth of the river where Highway 61 crosses it, which in 1957 were organized into the present state park. The Superior Hiking Trail, which crosses the Temperance River, does so in this park. There are three public campgrounds near the course of the river, two located near the mouth in Temperance River State Park and another in the Superior National Forest on the Sawbill Trail, roughly 12 miles (19 km) upstream from Temperance River State Park.

The flow of the Temperance is not currently regulated, but during the early 20th century, dams on Brule Lake, used in conjunction with some limited logging in the region of the Brule River, have modified how much water escapes into either river. In 1925, a 112-foot-long (34 m) canal was blasted between Brule Lake and the South Brule River, while a dam was built to close off its outlet into the Temperance, all without the permission of Minnesota's Game and Fish Department. These were later repaired, using nearby boulders, brush, and two bags of cement. During the 1920s, Edward Wellington Backus was attempting to build hydroelectric dams on northern Minnesotan rivers, and the blasting was likely connected to this development. It has been variously blamed on land speculators trying to convince buyers that the Brule had enough flow to be a viable source of hydroelectric power, or upon employees of a local development company working towards the same purpose.

== See also ==
- List of rivers of Minnesota
- List of longest streams of Minnesota
