= Brule Lake (Minnesota) =

Lake in the state of Minnesota, United States

- Location within Minnesota
- Location: Cook County, Minnesota, U.S.
- Coordinates: 47°56′25″N 90°40′56″W
- Primary outflows: Temperance River, Brule River
- Basin countries: United States
- Surface area: 4,272 acres (17 km^{2})
- Max. depth: 78 ft (24 m)
- Surface elevation: 1,851 ft (564 m)

Brule Lake is a lake in Cook County, Minnesota. It is situated between two long sills in the Superior Upland, causing the lake to be eight times longer east and west than it is north and south. Out of the opposite ends flow the Temperance River and the South Brule, a tributary of the Brule River. Brule Lake was logged heavily in the early 1900s, and the region around it was consumed in 1929 by a logging-related forest fire which bears Brule Lake's name. Now the lake is part of the protected Boundary Waters Canoe Area, a federal wilderness area for which Brule Lake serves as an entrance point.

== Topography ==
Brule Lake is one of the largest lakes in the eastern Arrowhead Region of Minnesota. It has an area of 4272 acres, and a maximum depth of 78 feet. It sits 1851 feet above sea level. It measures approximately eight miles from east to west, and one mile from north to south. Brule Lake is located in the Duluth Complex, a geological region marked by bands of softer, more erodible bedrock, and "red rock," a harder and less easily eroded stone, which forms protruding ridges across the Superior Uplands. In the region of the Brule, these ridges run nearly exactly east-west, and long, thin lakes lie between them. The valley in which Brule Lake is located is bound on the north by the Misquah Hills, and on the south by another sill peaked by Brule Mountain. Though the distance between these points is only four miles, the valley is six hundred feet deep. Brule Mountain, Misquah Hill (Point 2230), and Eagle Mountain are all prominent red rock monadnocks surrounding Brule Lake. Misquah Hill was erroneously identified as the highest point in Minnesota during the 1890s, until the United States Department of the Interior resurveyed in 1961, concluding that Eagle Mountain was taller by 74 feet.

Brule Lake is the source of both the Temperance and the South Brule Rivers. The Temperance drains from the west side of the lake, and flows some thirty miles until entering Lake Superior near Tofte. The South Brule drains from the east and flows some forty miles until entering Lake Superior forty three miles northeast of the mouth of the Temperance. The Temperance and Brule have the fourth and third largest catchment areas of any stream entering Lake Superior in Minnesota. Separated from the mainland by these two watersheds are the Poplar, Cascade, and Devil Track rivers, which drain a total of slightly over 300 square miles of land themselves.

== Plant and animal life ==
Brule Lake was stocked for walleye prior to 1985, and presently supports a self-sustained population. Smaller walleye's major forage, yellow perch, are small in number in Brule. This limits the size of the walleye population, although once they grow large enough they can forage on Brule's much larger cisco population. Northern pike and smallmouth bass are also sport fish found in this lake. The 2009 survey also turned up white sucker.

In February 1926, the Minnesota Game and Fish department organized a survey of the Brule and Winchell lakes region, which reported a heavy presence of moose, a comparatively light presence of deer, also timber wolves, foxes, mink, and the trail of a Canadian lynx.

== Human use ==
Brule Lake lies in a region which has seen human population since the end of the last ice age. It has variously been within the territory of the Dakota, Cree, Ojibwa, French, British, and Americans. It saw little development until the opening of a railroad that allowed loggers easier access to the interior of the Arrowhead region's dense pine forest. A survey of the region was made by Ulysses S. Grant II and Newton Horace Winchell in 1893, which established the surface elevation of the Brule and the heights of many of the hills around it. In 1898, the Duluth and Northern Minnesota Railroad was opened to service the logging firm of Alger, Smith Company, and in time a spur of this railroad was built to Lake Brule.

Around 1920, the General Logging Company had acquired the rights to stands of white pine in the region of Brule Lake from the Alger, Smith Company. Laws requiring the removal of pine slash were not being effectively enforced in the region, increasing the danger of forest fire. On July 22, 1929, a fire was spotted between Brule and Star Lake. Twenty one days later, the Brule Lake Fire had burned 25,708 acres of forest, cost $20,000 to extinguish, and demonstrated the insufficiency of the United States Forest Service's firefighting capacity in the region.

With the decline of the lumber industry between 1920 and 1940, many lumber railways were dismantled, including the Alger line. The railroad grade was acquired by the county and now functions as a gravel road, known as "The Grade," which provides the only access for motorized vehicles to Brule Lake.

In 1925, an unauthorized 112-foot-long (34 m), ten-foot wide, and four-foot deep canal was blasted between Brule Lake and the South Brule River allegedly by the Arrowhead Land and Outing Corporation, while a dam was built to close off its outlet into the Temperance. The action was supported by the Brule Land & Outing Company which operated a resort in the area and threatened legal action if Minnesota Game and Fish Commissioner James F. Gould ordered the channel filled in and the dam removed. Gould cited low water levels in the Temperance River, depleted fish populations, and "the damage of public interest" as cause for his opposition to the channel and dam. These were later repaired, using nearby boulders, brush, and two bags of cement. During the 1920s, Edward Wellington Backus was attempting to build hydroelectric dams on northern Minnesotan rivers, and the blasting was likely connected to this development. It has been variously blamed on land speculators trying to convince buyers that the Brule had enough flow to be a viable source of hydroelectric power, or upon employees of a local development company working towards the same purpose.

=== Recreation ===
With the decline of logging in the area, human activity on Brule Lake became increasingly recreational. Lockport Lodge in Lutsen advertised seaplane charters to the lake for lake trout and walleye fishing as early as 1940. Brule Lake and much of the land around it gradually was brought under federal protection, and came to be incorporated into what is now the Boundary Waters Canoe Area. In 1964, the United States government passed the Wilderness Act, designating the BWCA a wilderness area under special conservation rules. Lakes such as Brule where motorboats had previously been used were given temporary variances for continued motor use. As a resort was located on Brule's shores, motorboats with a motor under 10 horsepower were permitted by law to continue to operate until 1994 or the resort closed. Since the resort closed, Brule Lake is open only to non-motorized craft, and is the largest non-motorized lake contained entirely within the BWCA.

== See also ==
- Gust Hagberg
