= Gusty =

Gusty may refer to:

== People ==
- Gusty Bausch (born 1980), Luxembourgish cyclo-cross cyclist
- Gusty Spence (1933–2011), a leader of the Ulster Volunteer Force
- Grégoire Laurent (1906–1985), Luxembourgish boxer also known as "Gusty"
- Gustavus Louis "Gusty" Fries, the founder of a local park known as Fries Park in Marrtown, West Virginia
- "Gusties", nickname of students of Gustavus Adolphus College, St. Peter, Minnesota

== Fictional characters ==
- Gusty, a cartoon character created by the meteorologist Don Woods
- Arthur Gusty and Mrs. Gusty, characters from the 1938 film Everything Happens to Me
- Gusty and Baby Gusty, characters from the television series My Little Pony
- Gusty, an elf character in Wee Sing: The Best Christmas Ever!

== Places ==
- Gusty Gully, a small Antarctic north-south valley
- Gusty Peak, a mountain in Alberta, Canada

== See also ==
- Gusty's Child, a memoir by Alice Tisdale Hobart
- Gust (disambiguation)
- Windy (disambiguation)
