= Queen Elizabeth II Wildlands Provincial Park =

Provincial park in Ontario

- IUCN category II (national park)
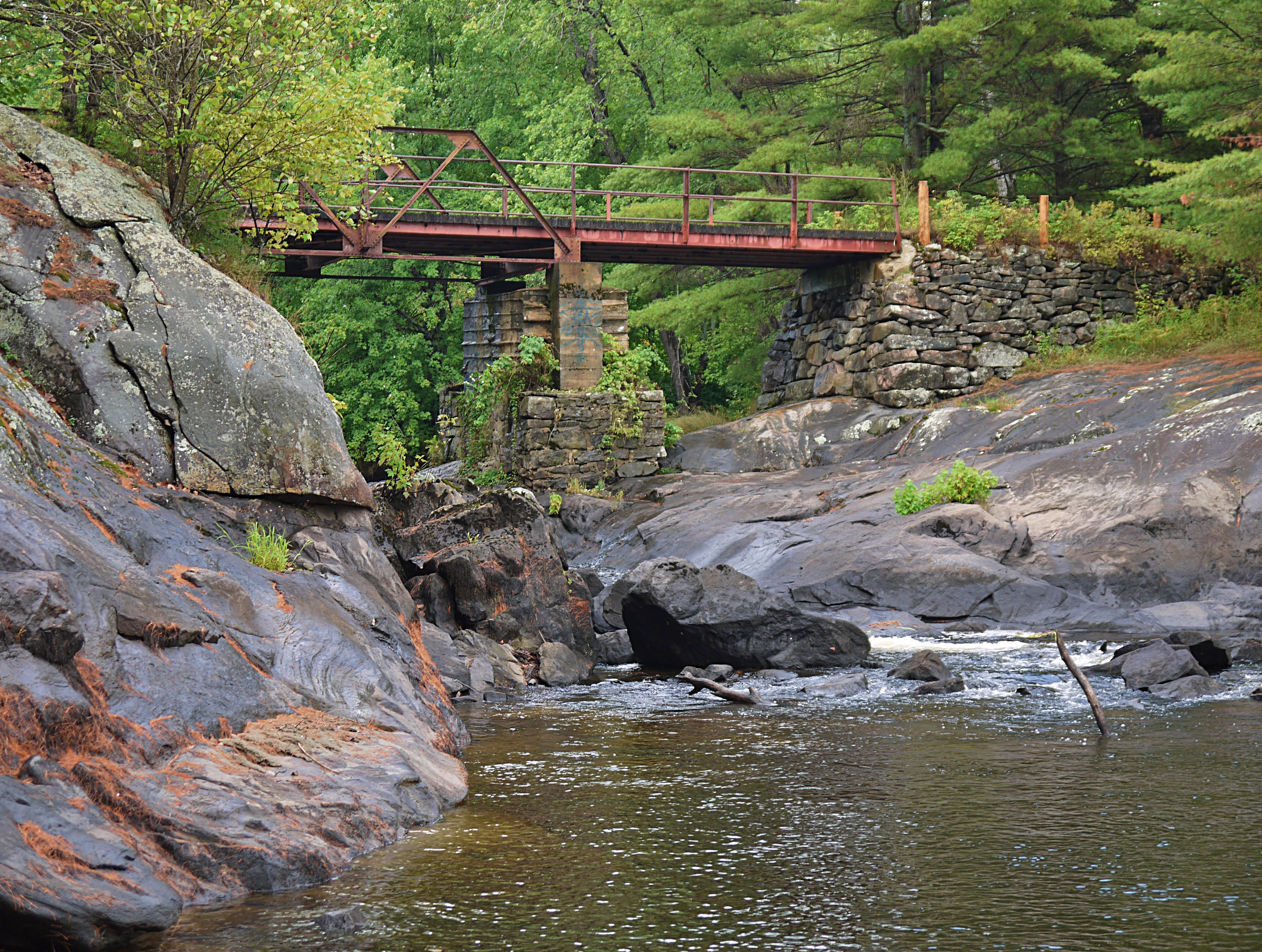
- Victoria Bridge on the Black River

- Location within Southern Ontario
- Interactive map of Queen Elizabeth II Wildlands Provincial Park
- Location: Ontario, Canada
- Nearest city: Minden, Ontario
- Coordinates: 44°50′0″N 78°56′0″W
- Area: 335 km^{2} (129 sq mi)
- Established: May 2002
- Governing body: Ontario Parks

The Queen Elizabeth II Wildlands Provincial Park is a provincial park in south-central Ontario, Canada, between Gravenhurst and Minden. The park, named for Elizabeth II, who at the time was Queen of Canada, is 33,505 hectares in size, making it the second largest park south of Algonquin Park (after Kawartha Highlands Provincial Park), but it has a fragmented shape as a result of many private lands within its boundary.

It was originally known as Dalton Digby Wildlands Provincial Park, after the two townships it encompassed, before being renamed on October 9, 2002, to commemorate Queen Elizabeth II's Golden Jubilee visit to Ontario. It fulfilled a promise by the then-Conservative government of Ontario to name a new provincial park in her honour.

The park is one of the largest and least developed natural areas south of Algonquin Park. It protects an ecological diverse and biologically significant area with more than 50 vegetation patterns. The park has a low rolling topography which includes organic soils, flat sandy deposits, wetlands, bare bedrock plain and bare bedrock uplands with shallow soil patches, characterized by numerous rock ridges, including scenic cliffs and gorges, separating dozens of small lakes, rivers and streams.

This vast area was once covered with forest and deeper soils prior to the logging era. Following logging, devastating forest fires swept through the area burning off the shallow organic soils leading to severe soil erosion and barren rock surfaces. Many lakes were filled, or partly filled with sediment, and have become marshes. There are a few islands in the various lakes that escaped the fires, and accordingly remain with deeper soil and much larger trees that stand out boldly in the otherwise low-relief terrain. For many years, this region was known as 'The Burnt Lands'.

The park contains numerous outdoor recreation opportunities including six major canoe routes, the wilderness section of the Ganaraska Hiking Trail, and remote fly-in fishing camps.

The park is a "non-operating park" without any visitor facilities or services. Backcountry camping is allowed.

== Fauna ==
The following species have been identified in the park:

- 13 amphibians and 12 reptiles, of which 5 are provincially rare, including the endangered northern ribbon snake
- 117 bird species, of which 6 are provincially rare. 23 species are known to breed inside the park.
- 17 mammals, such as American black bear, North American beaver, and moose
- 63 invertebrates, of which 8 are provincially rare
- at least 8 fish species, such as rainbow, lake, and brook trout, largemouth and smallmouth bass.

== See also ==
- List of Ontario parks
- Ontario Parks
- Natural Environment Park (Ontario)
- Monarchy in Ontario
- Royal eponyms in Canada
