= Gust =

Gust is a given name, surname, and a shortened version of Augustus, Augusta, Gustave, August, Augustine, and Gussie and may refer to:

== People ==
=== Given name ===
- Gust Avrakotos (1938–2005), CIA case officer known for the arming of Afghanistan's Mujahideen against the Soviet invasion under Operation Cyclone
- Gust Graas (1924–2020), Luxembourg businessman and painter
- Gust Hagberg (19th-century–20th-century)
- Gust Kundert (1913–2000), American politician
- Gust Lamesch (1911–?), Luxembourgish fencer
- Gust E. Lundberg (1920–1977), founder of the Sandy's fast-food restaurant chain
- Gust Stemmler (1899–1986), former Democratic member of the Pennsylvania House of Representatives
- Gust J. Swenning (1917–1942), American sailor who served in the United States Navy
- Gust Zarnas (1913–2000), college football All-American and professional football player

=== Surname ===
- Neil Gust, American musician known for co-founding Heatmiser with Elliott Smith in 1992
- Wolfgang Gust (1935-2026), German journalist, historian, author and chief of heading for magazine Der Spiegel
- Ernie Gust (1888–1945), Early 20th century professional baseball player
- Reinhard Gust (born 1950), German rower, who competed for the SC Dynamo Berlin / Sportvereinigung (SV)
- Anne Gust (born 1958), American businesswoman and politician
- Ian Gust (born 1941), an Australian medical researcher, virologist, and former science administrator
- Werner Gust (1910–1979), highly decorated Oberst in the Wehrmacht during World War II

== GUST ==
- TeX User Group Poland (pl:Polska Grupa Użytkowników Systemu TeX) or their fonts distributed with Ghostscript
- Glasgow University Student Television
- Gulf University for Science and Technology, the first private university established in Kuwait
- Galway United Supporters Trust

== Other uses ==
- Wind gust, a short blast of wind
- Outflow boundary or gust front, a storm-scale or mesoscale boundary separating thunderstorm-cooled air from the surrounding air
- Gust (company), a Japanese video game developer

== See also ==
- Gusty (disambiguation)
