= Palisade Head =

Rock formation in Minnesota, United States

Coordinates: 47°19′11″N 91°12′59″W

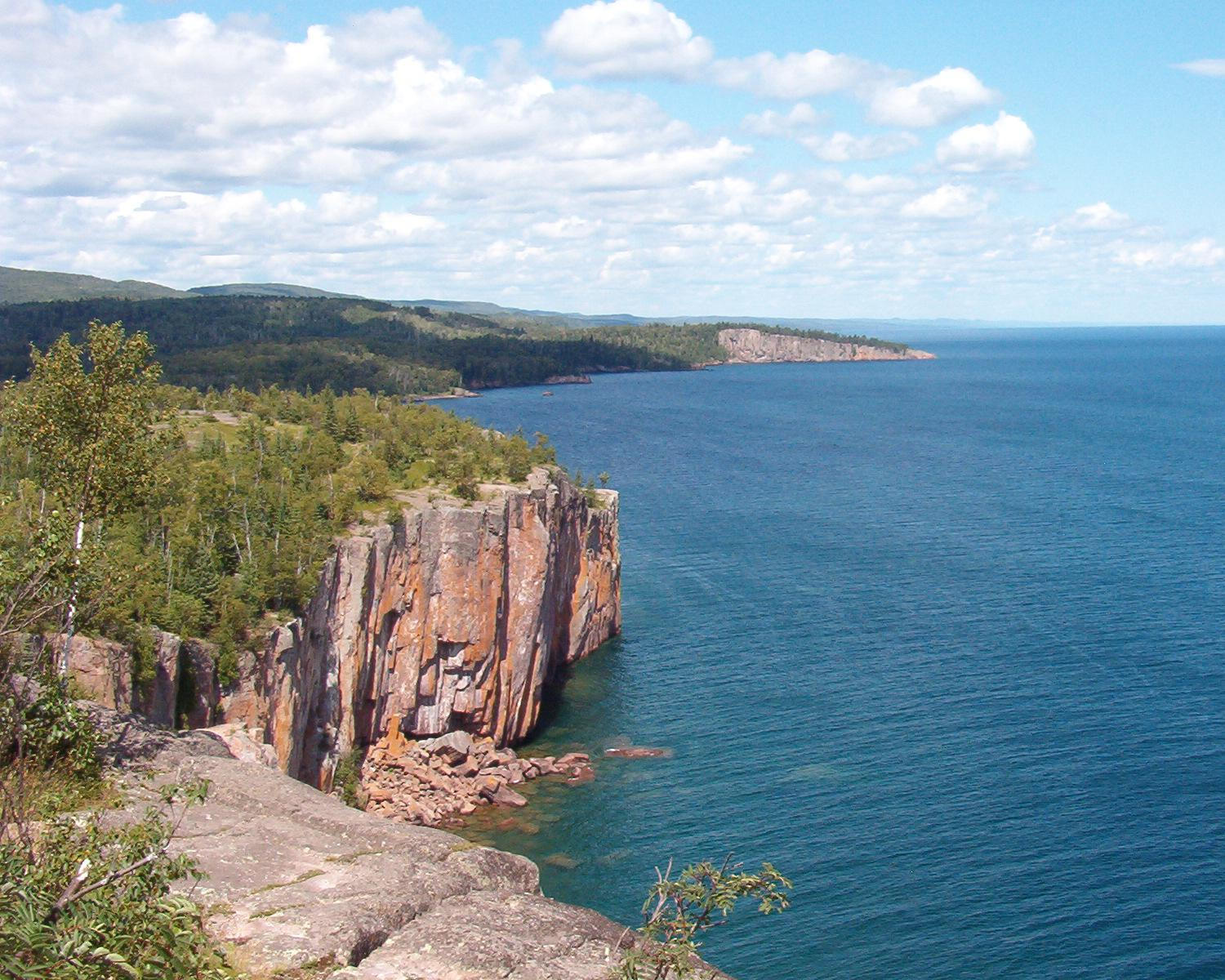
Palisade Head cliffs on Lake Superior, looking northeast toward Shovel Point

Palisade Head is a headland on the North Shore of Lake Superior in the U.S. state of Minnesota. It is part of Tettegouche State Park but not contiguous with the rest of that park. Palisade Head is located at milepost 57 on scenic Minnesota State Highway 61 in Lake County, approximately 54 miles (87 km) northeast of Duluth and three miles (4.8 km) northeast of Silver Bay.

== Geology ==
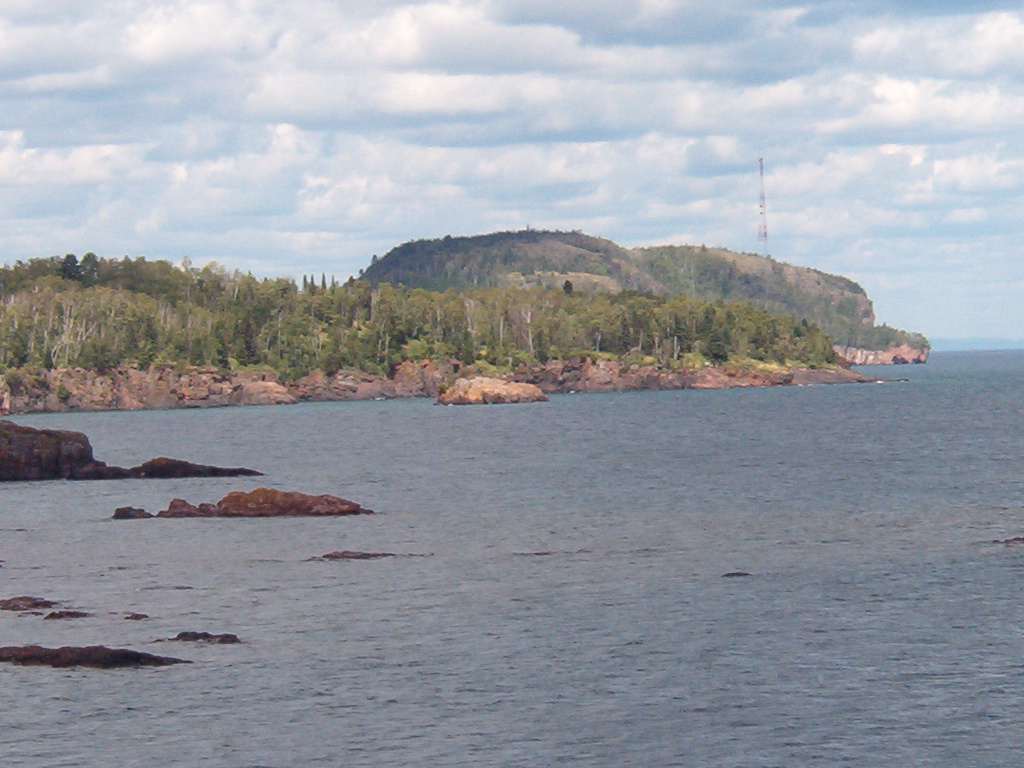
Palisade Head rising above an intermediate point, viewed from the west near Silver Bay, Minnesota

Palisade Head was formed from a rhyolitic lava flow extruded some 1.1 billion years ago. During the Mesoproterozoic era of the Precambrian eon, the continent spread apart on the Midcontinent Rift System extending from what is now eastern Lake Superior through Duluth to Kansas; this rifting process stopped before an ocean developed. A lava flow some 200 feet (61 meters) thick formed extremely hard volcanic rock which resisted a billion years of erosion which cut down surrounding formations. This formed both Palisade Head and Shovel Point, which is within the main part of Tettegouche State Park about two miles (three kilometers) to the east. The feature is a shallow headland, with Lake Superior to the southwest, southeast, and northeast. Its high point is 335 feet (approximately 102 meters) above the level of the lake; the lakeside cliffs stand up to several hundred feet (60 meters) above the water.

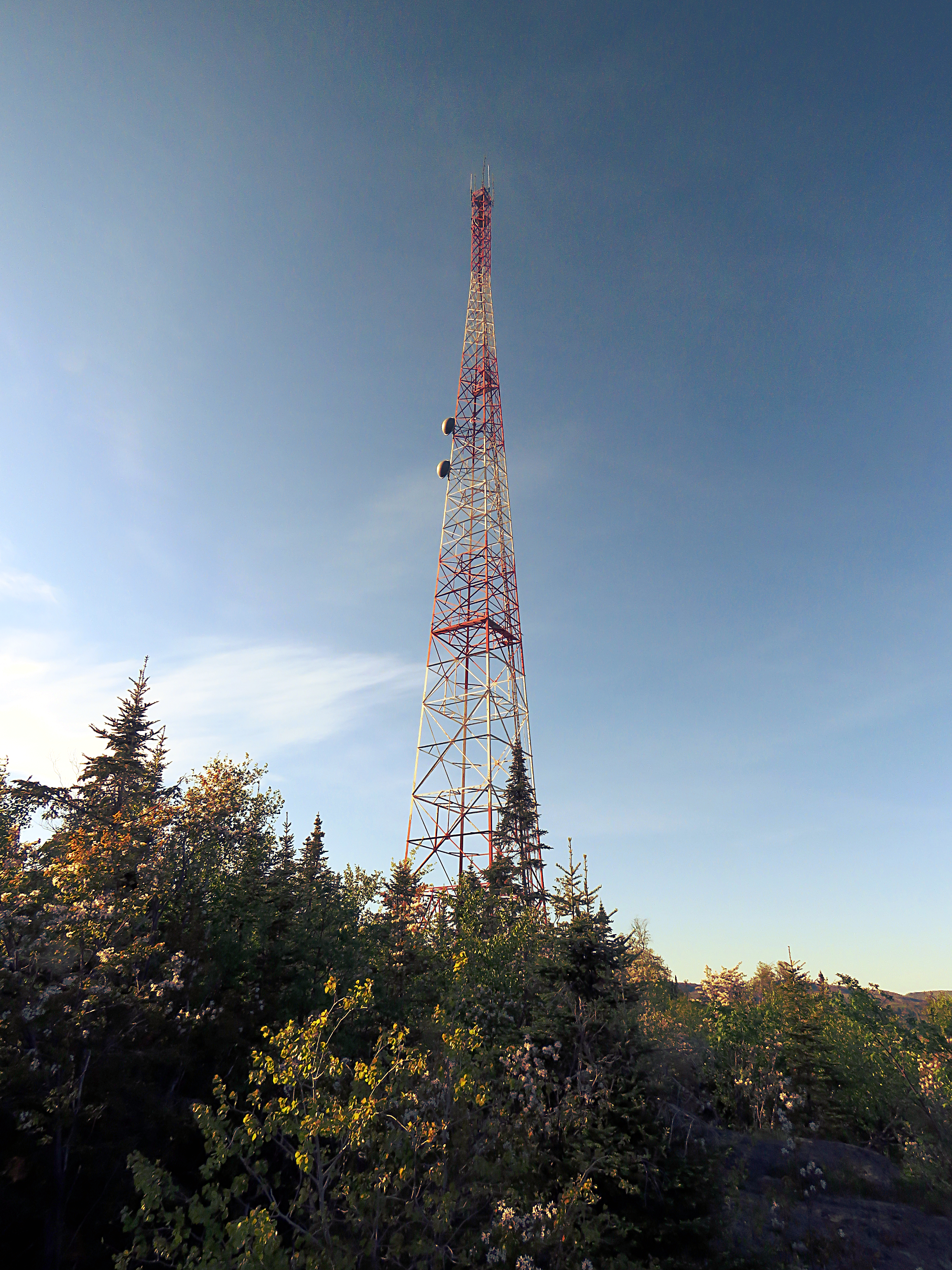
Radio tower on Palisade Head

== Flora and fauna ==
The headland is covered by a mixed forest of white spruce, mountain ash, aspen, paper birch, and oak. Raptors can often be seen soaring over the cliffs. Peregrine falcons nest on Palisade Head, Bald eagles nest in the area, and thousands of hawks of several species can be seen migrating along the shoreline in the fall. There are plentiful wild blueberries and, less commonly, gooseberries.

== Deaths ==
Palisade Head is maintained in its natural state, and one can walk up to the edge of sheer cliffs with the lake directly below. In April 2010, a forty-eight-year-old woman fell from the top of Palisade Head and was killed. It is believed that this incident was an accident, as she was excited about starting a new job at the time of the fall. On September 11, 2017, a fourteen-year-old girl lost her balance and fell to her death from the top of the cliff.

== Human uses ==
Palisade Head is undeveloped; there are no improvements except for an access road, antenna tower, short-term parking, and a few low rock walls near the edge of the cliffs. On clear days there are views of the Sawtooth Mountains to the northeast, Split Rock Lighthouse on the shore to the southwest, the Bayfield Peninsula and Apostle Islands of Wisconsin across the lake to the south, and ship traffic on Lake Superior.

It is a regional center for rock climbing with many routes up the lakeshore cliffs. The majority of the rock climbing routes range from 5.8 to 5.12 on the Yosemite Decimal System grading scale, with a few routes in the 5.13 range. Most of the climbing routes require traditional climbing gear to protect the climber.

These cliffs were used for more sinister, albeit fictional purposes in The Good Son, the climax of which was filmed on location at Palisade Head.

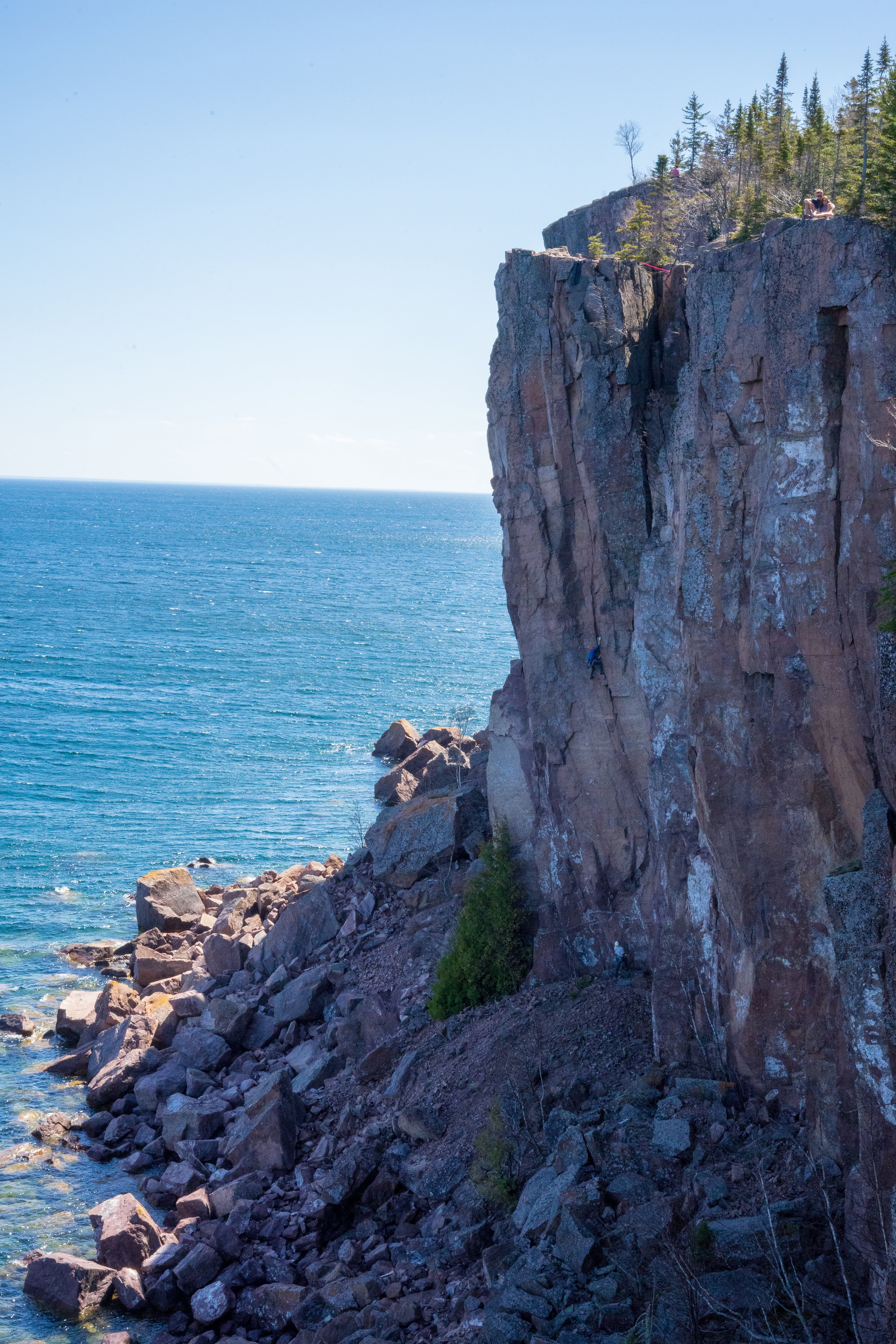
North Tower and red-helmeted and white-gloved rock climber (visible at higher resolution) to the right of the sheer cliff and above the person standing on the scree; others are visible atop the cliff
