= North Shore Commercial Fishing Museum =

Museum in Tofte, Minnesota

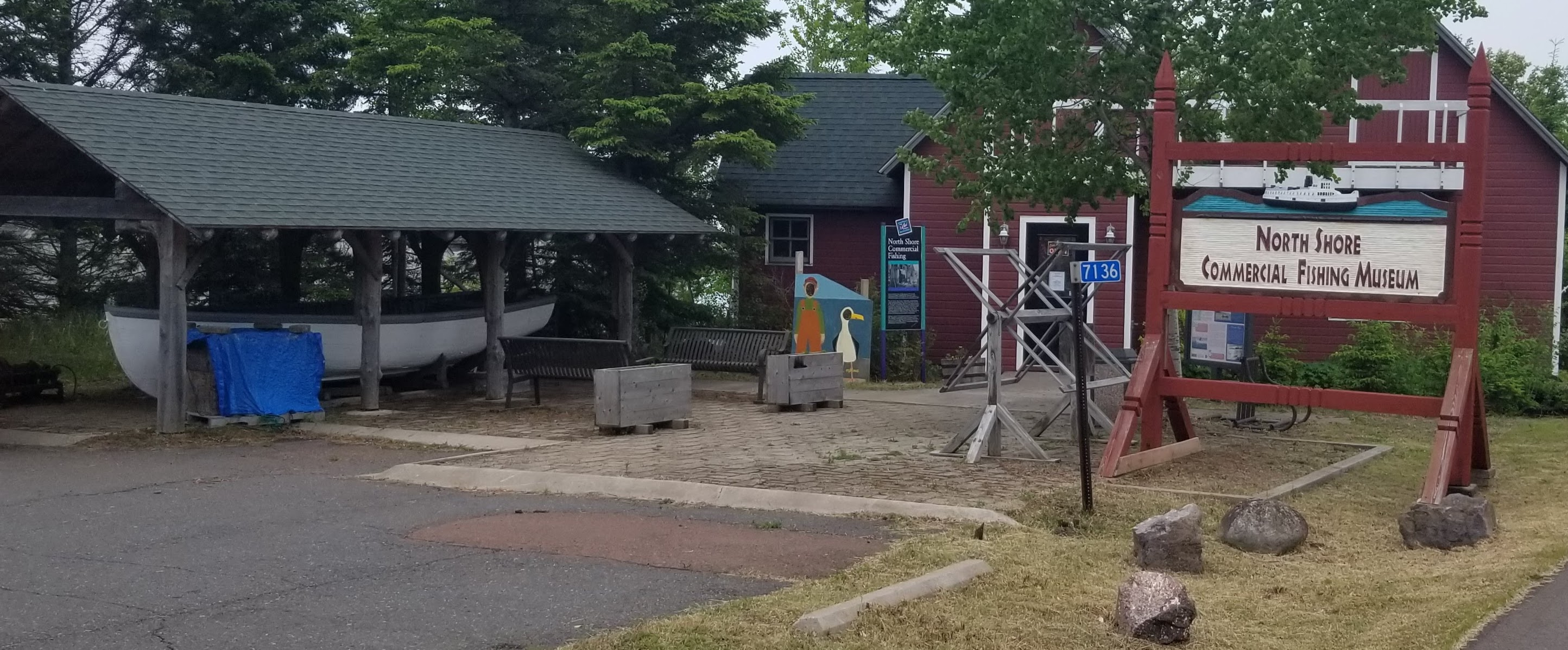
- Established: September 1996 (29 years ago)
- Location: Tofte, Minnesota
- Coordinates: 47°34′34″N 90°49′53.5″W
- Type: History
- Director: Mary Jane Huggins
- Website: commercialfishingmuseum.org

The North Shore Commercial Fishing Museum is a museum in Tofte, Minnesota, dedicated to the history of the Scandinavian immigrants and communities of the North Shore region of Lake Superior, and especially their importance to the national commercial fishing industry of the 1880s to 1940s. It is Minnesota's first museum dedicated to commercial fishing.

The Norwegian American newspaper called the museum an important chronicle of Scandinavian immigrant history, saying the museum "offers the region’s most complete explanation of North Shore commercial fishing history." Nina Gadomski, author of the 2005 book Great Midwest Country Escapes, called it "a great little museum". Mike Whye of the Des Moines Register said that the museum is "small, but it gives a fine account of the industry that drove this part of the state for decades."

== History ==
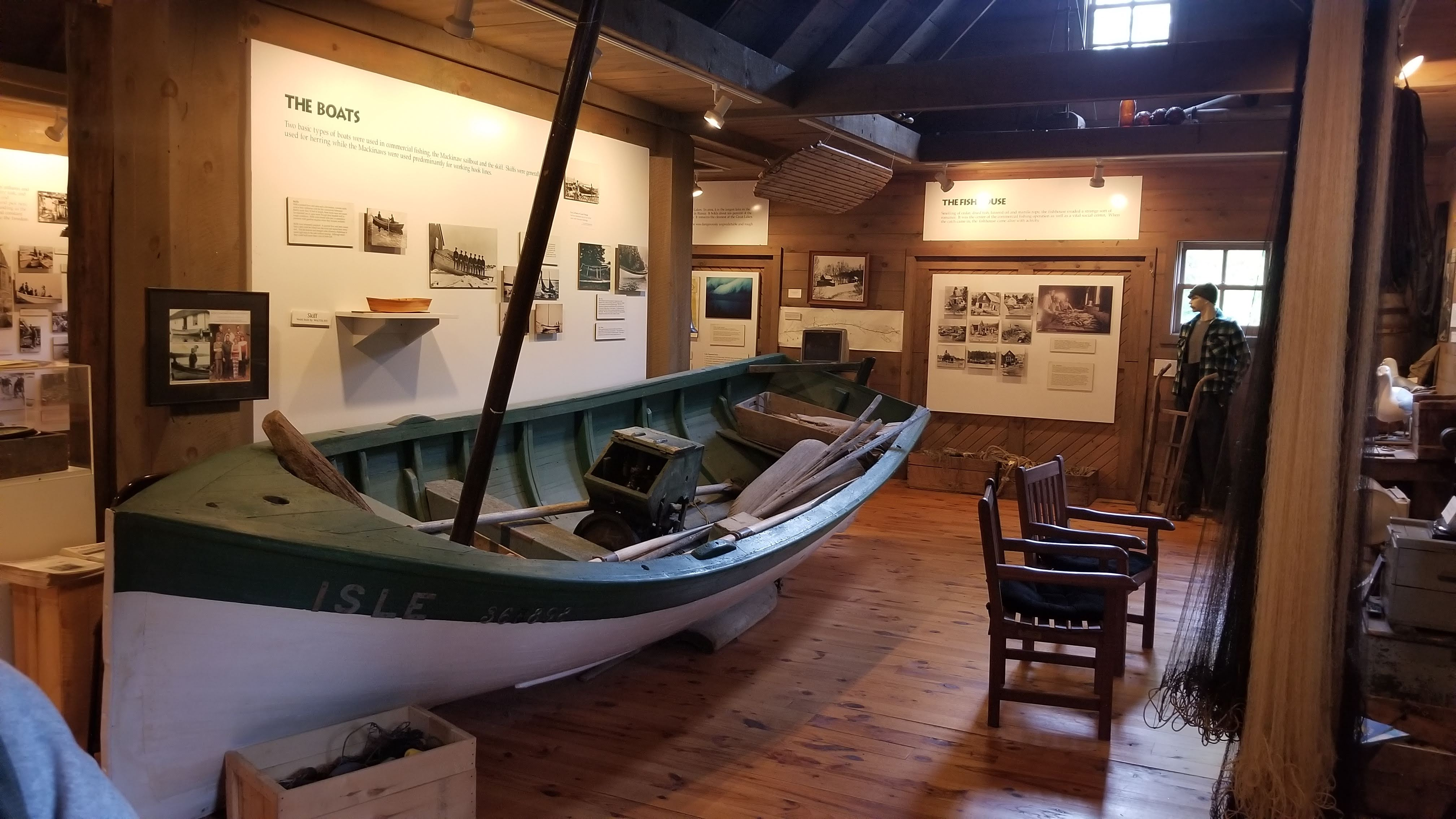
Exhibits at the museum include a typical Norwegian-style fishing boat

The museum opened in September 1996. The museum was founded by a group of Tofte residents including Brian Tofte, grandson of the town founders and a collector of oral histories of retired Lake Superior fishermen. It is operated and governed by the Tofte Historical Society.

The museum shares its building with the Lutsen-Tofte Tourism Association. The structure is a replica of the 1905 fish houses built by town founders Andrew and John Tofte and Hans Engelsen, which once stood across the bay.

== Focus ==
The museum traces the development of the commercial fishing industry, with a focus on Lake Superior, fishing families, and fishing techniques of the heyday of the industry from the 1880s to 1950s, when fish from Lake Superior were an important food source for the entire United States. At that time, the workers were usually lone fishermen or small groups, and almost exclusively made up of Norwegian immigrants. Before overfishing and the introduction of exotic species crashed native fish populations in Lake Superior, the sizable populations of whitefish, herring, and trout supported an enormous business, with a fishing establishment located, on average, every half-mile of the Superior shoreline. During this time, fishing was the main source of livelihood for North Shore residents, followed by logging and farming.

== Exhibits ==
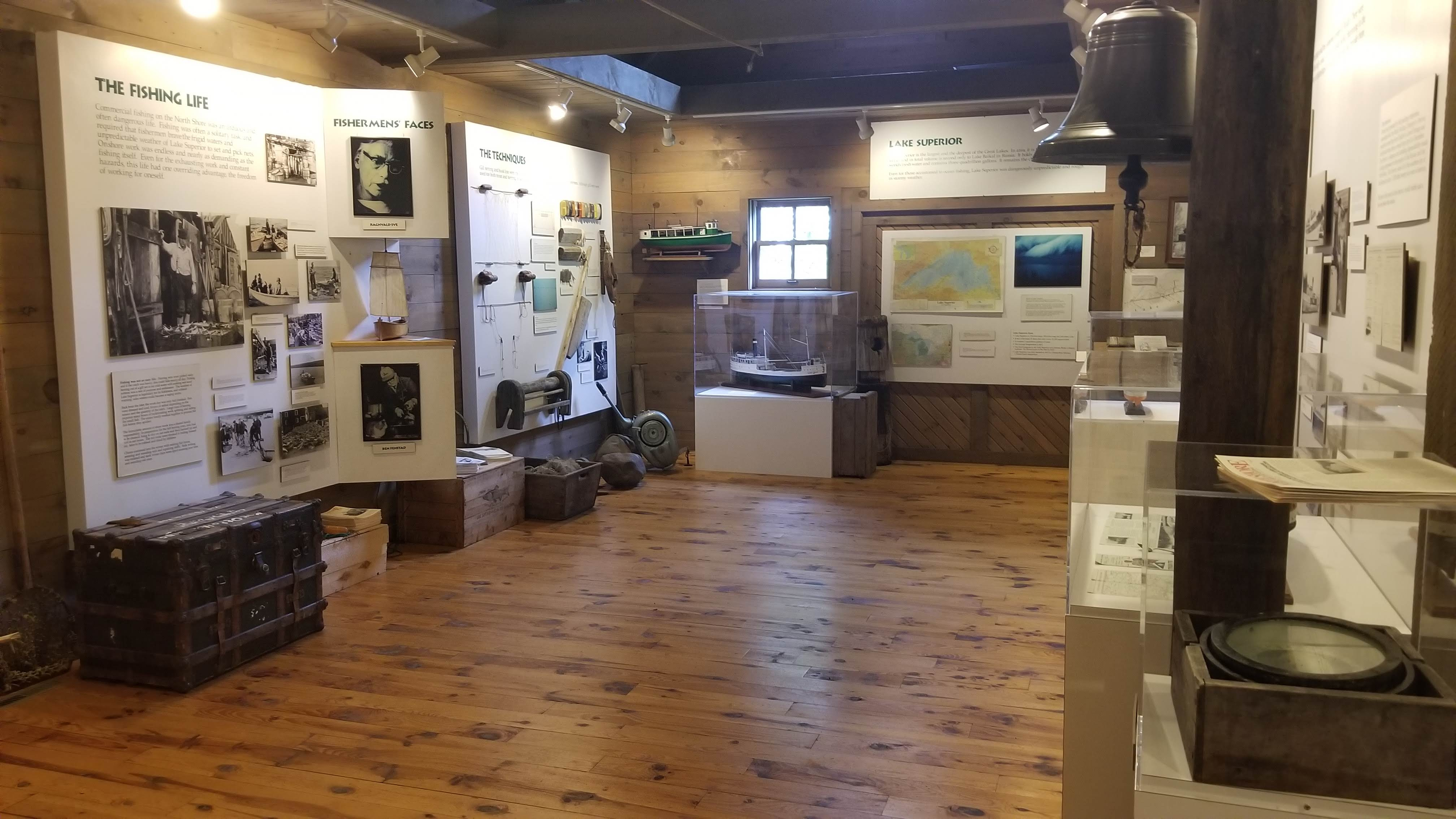
Exhibits at the museum including the bell of the steamship America, on right

The museum's collections include artifacts such as herring shovels and gill nets, pictures, and oral histories collected from fishermen and members of their families.

The building itself is a reconstructed replica of the twin fish house shared by twin brothers Andrew and John Tofte and Hans Engelsen, who founded the town in 1893.

Exhibits of particular note include:

- The Viking, a fishing boat owned by local fisherman Walter Sve, as well as a special structure to protect it from the elements called a grindbygg, a type of Norwegian boat shelter used since Bronze Age times, constructed by artisans from the North House Folk School in nearby Grand Marais, Minnesota.
- An exhibit on the steamship America, an important link between Duluth and other communities on the North Shore, which sank near Isle Royale in 1928. The museum's exhibit features a scale model of the America and its bell, which was donated to the museum in 2001.
- An exhibit detailing the heroic but ultimately failed attempt by Helmer Aakvik to rescue a fellow fisherman lost in a late-November winter storm. Aakvik became trapped on the icy lake himself, and survived the night in 25-foot waves while chopping ice off his boat and body with an axe and battling the disintegration of his boat.

== Journal ==
The historical society has published the North Shore Commercial Fishing Museum Journal quarterly since 1993. The publication features articles on the fishing families, lore, and history of the North Shore.
