= Natural Environment Park (Ontario) =

Park designation in Ontario, Canada

Natural Environment Park is the designation given by the Ontario Provincial Park System to parks which act as both recreational parks and Nature Reserves. They protect wildlife, while allowing camping and other recreational activities.

As of February 2008, the province lists 67 parks of this classification, including Algonquin Provincial Park, a park of 765,345 hectares.

== See also ==
- List of Ontario Parks
