= Gust Hagberg =

Gust Hagberg (born c. 1873) was a Swedish Immigrant to the Arrowhead Region of Minnesota during the late 19th century. Hagberg lived along the eastern end of the Duluth & Northern Minnesota Railway (Alger-Smith Line), where it passed northwest of Little Cascade Lake. He was known by the name Jockmock, derived from the name of his hometown of Jokkmokk in Norrbotten, Sweden. He lived there until at least 1940.

Hagberg was the namesake of several lakes or water features in Cook County, Minnesota: Gust Lake, the source of the Poplar River, Jock Mock Lake, which lies nearby but is a tributary to the Cascade River and Jock Mock Bay on Lake Brule.
