= Cascade River State Park =

State park in Minnesota, US

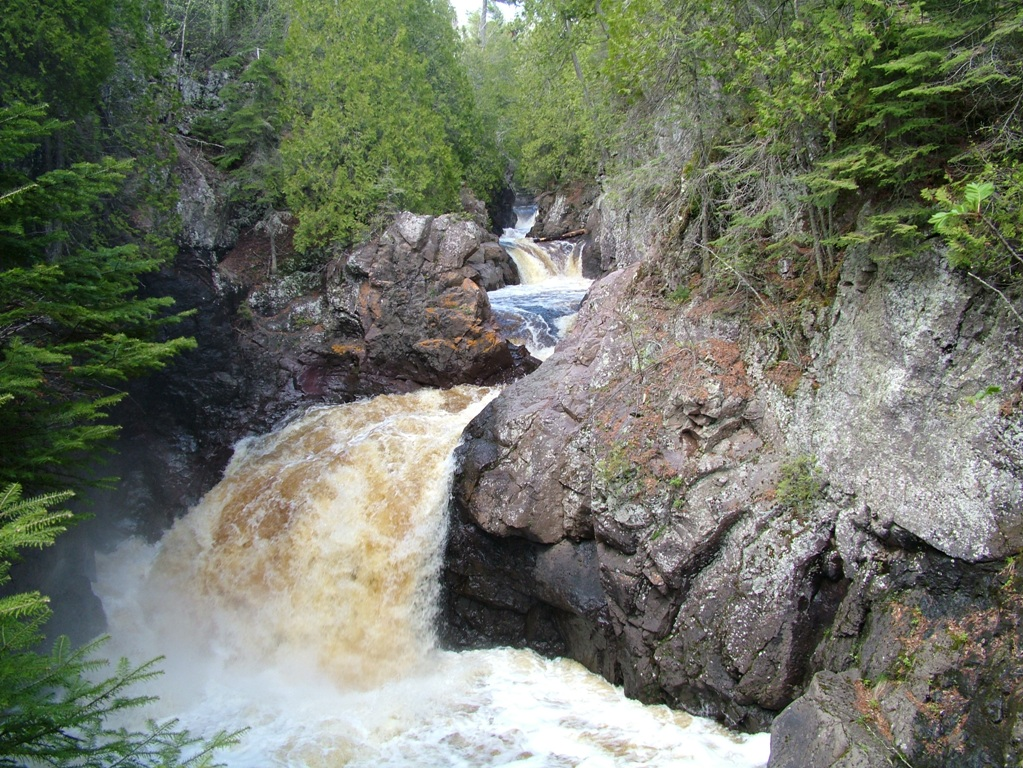
- The Cascade River

- Location within Minnesota Location within the United States
- Location: Cook, Minnesota, United States
- Coordinates: 47°42′35″N 90°31′20″W
- Area: 5,050 acres (20.4 km^{2})
- Elevation: 732 ft (223 m)
- Established: 1957
- Governing body: Minnesota Department of Natural Resources

Cascade River State Park is a state park near the northeastern tip of Minnesota, US. The park is in a rocky and rugged location where the Cascade River descends to meet Lake Superior. It has many different types of wildlife including various birds and mammals.

Cascade River State Park is also connected to the Superior Hiking Trail.

The site was originally named Cascade River State Wayside. It was developed by the Civilian Conservation Corps starting around July 1934. One of the projects was a huge 535 feet (163 m) overlook wall, built from locally quarried gabbro. The roadside development plans were drawn by Arthur R. Nichols and Harold E. Olson. The project was considered a model for roadside development. The development work was supervised and inspected not just by National Park Service employees, but also by members of the Minnesota Highway Department, staff of the Minneapolis Park Board, Civilian Conservation Corps individuals, members of the Minnesota Legislature, and some Canadian officials. The wayside was listed on the National Register of Historic Places on August 4, 2003.

== Gallery ==
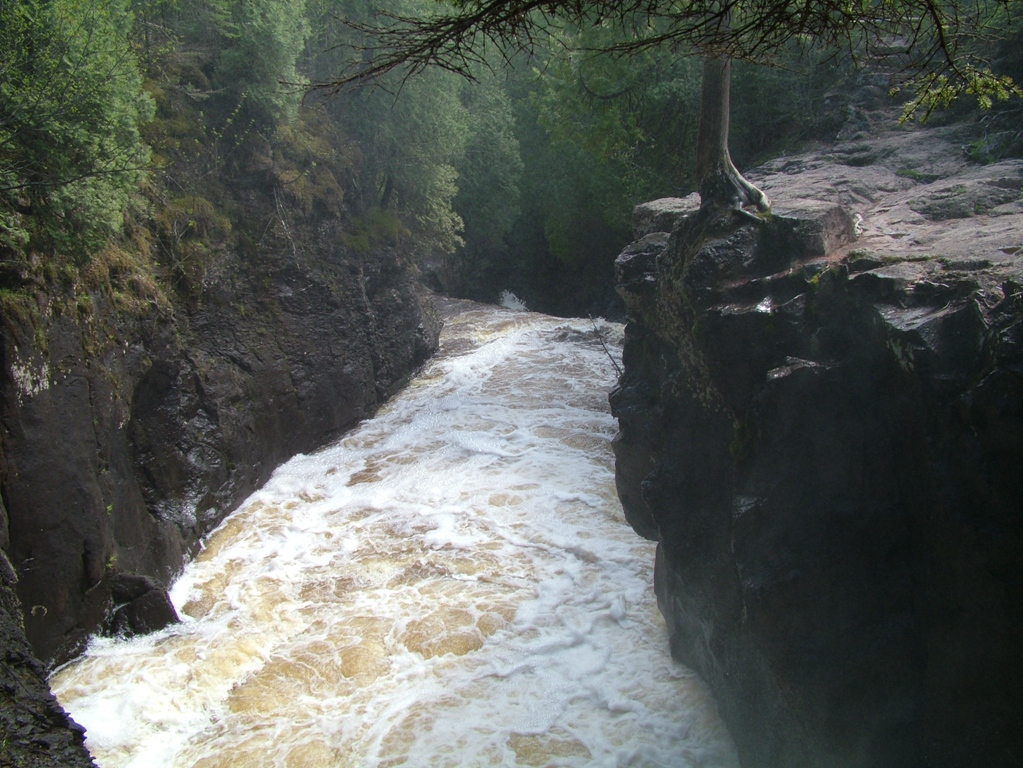
The Cascade River

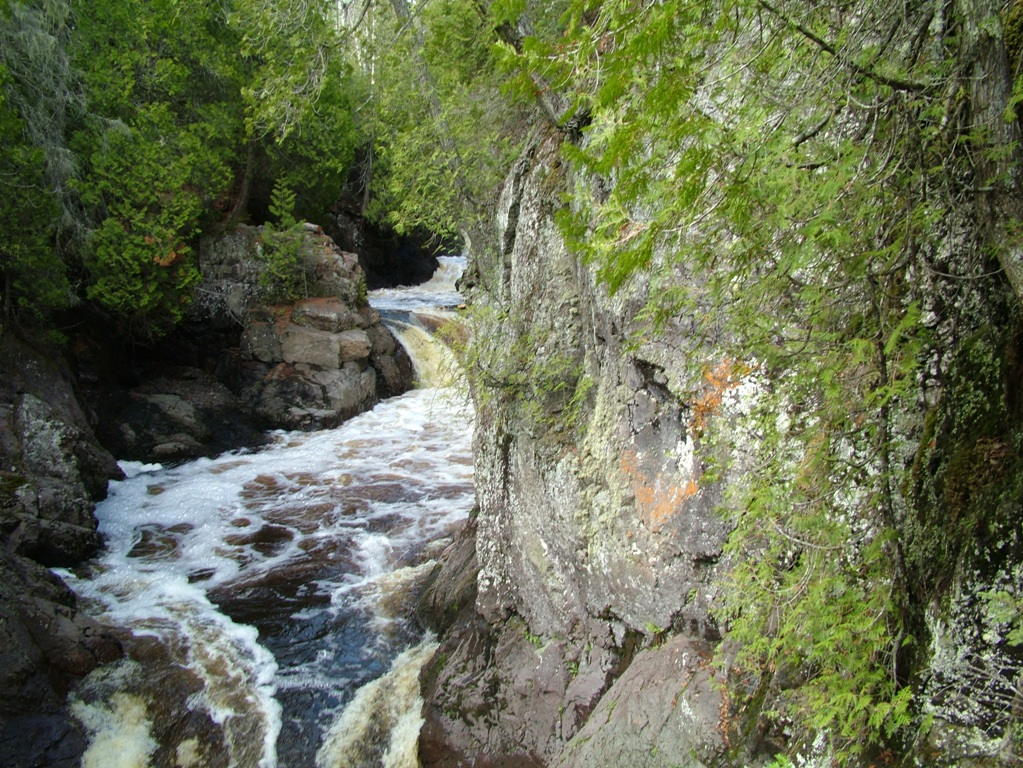
The Cascade River

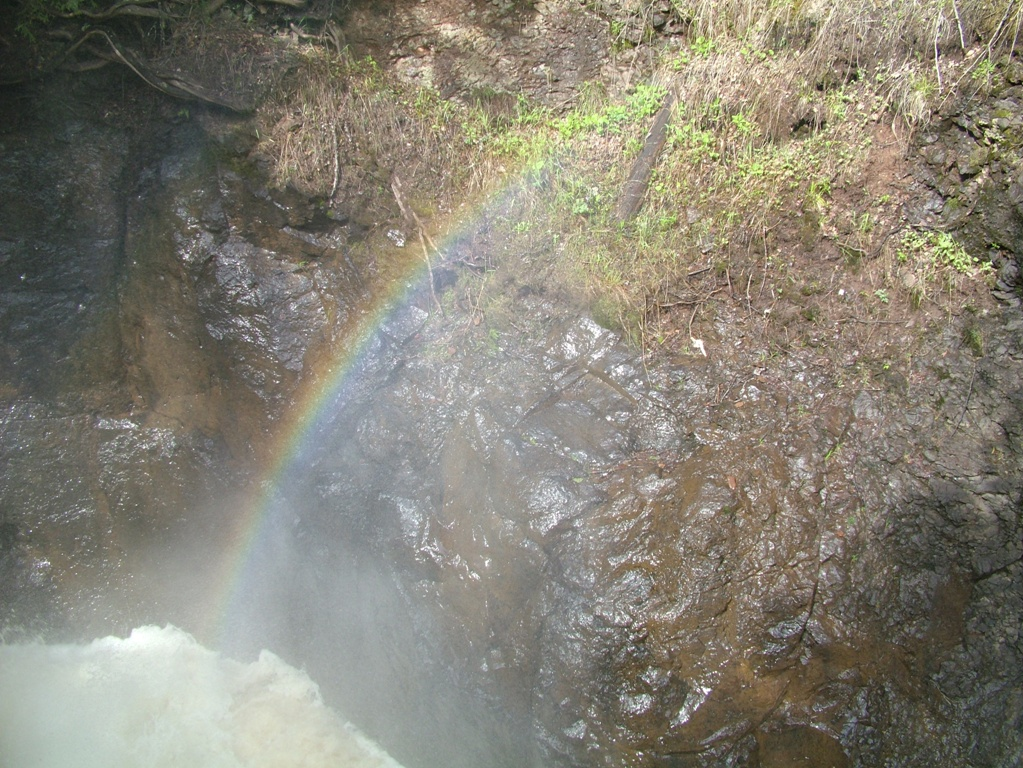
A rainbow over the Cascade River

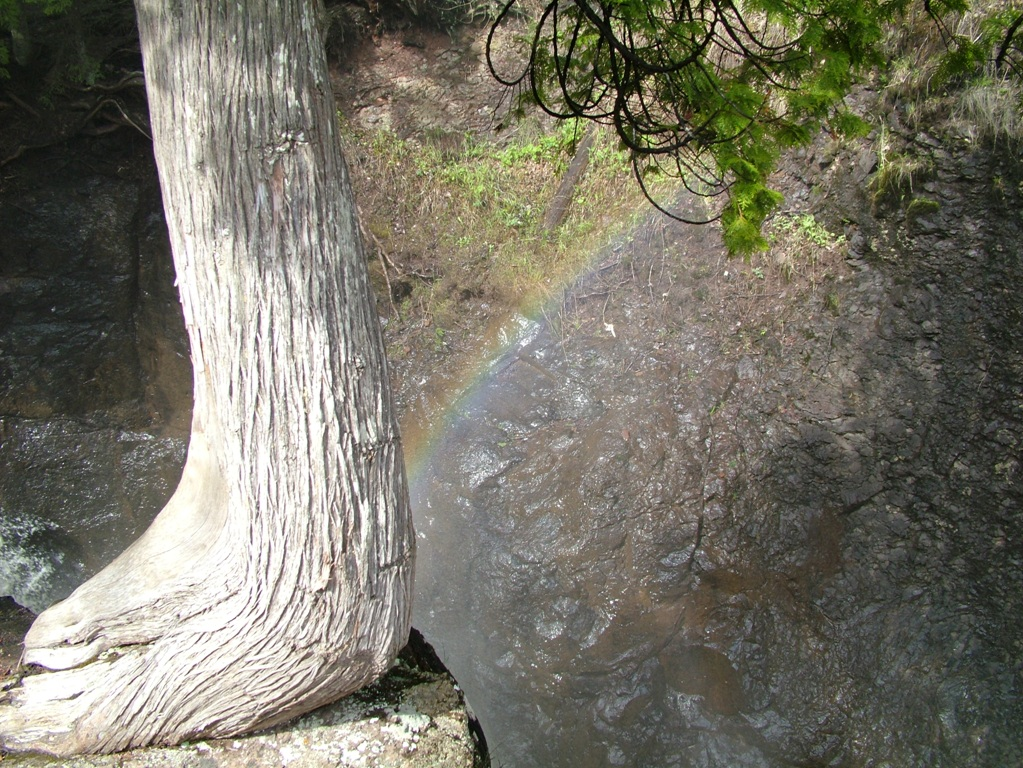
A rainbow over the Cascade River

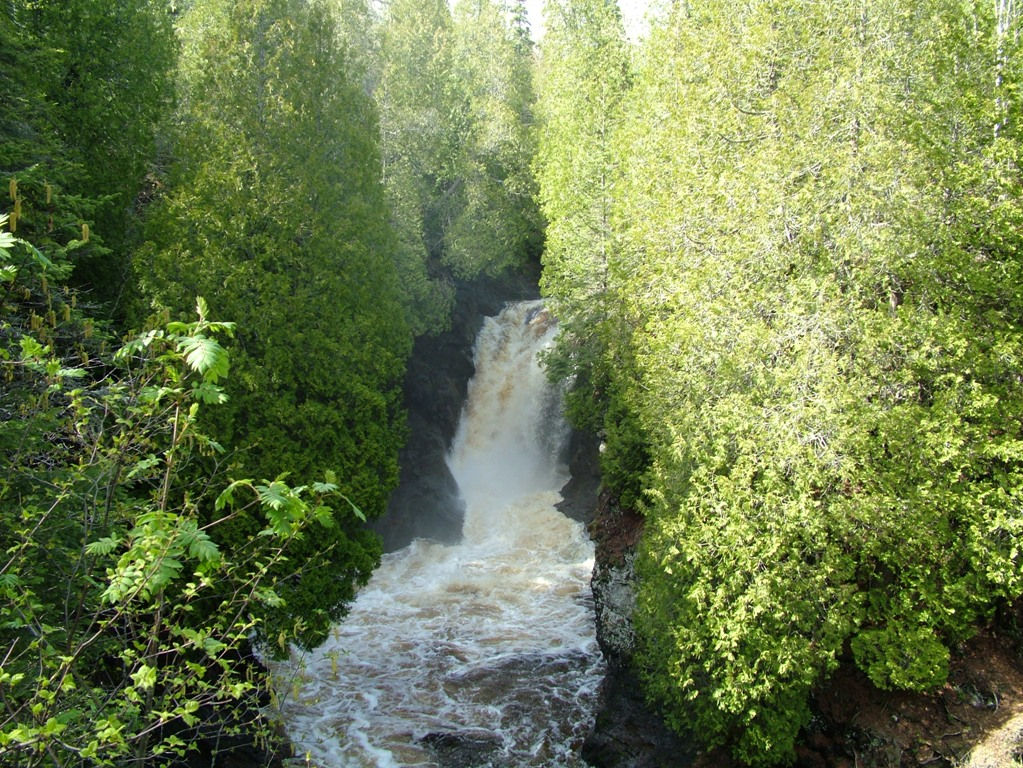
The Cascade River

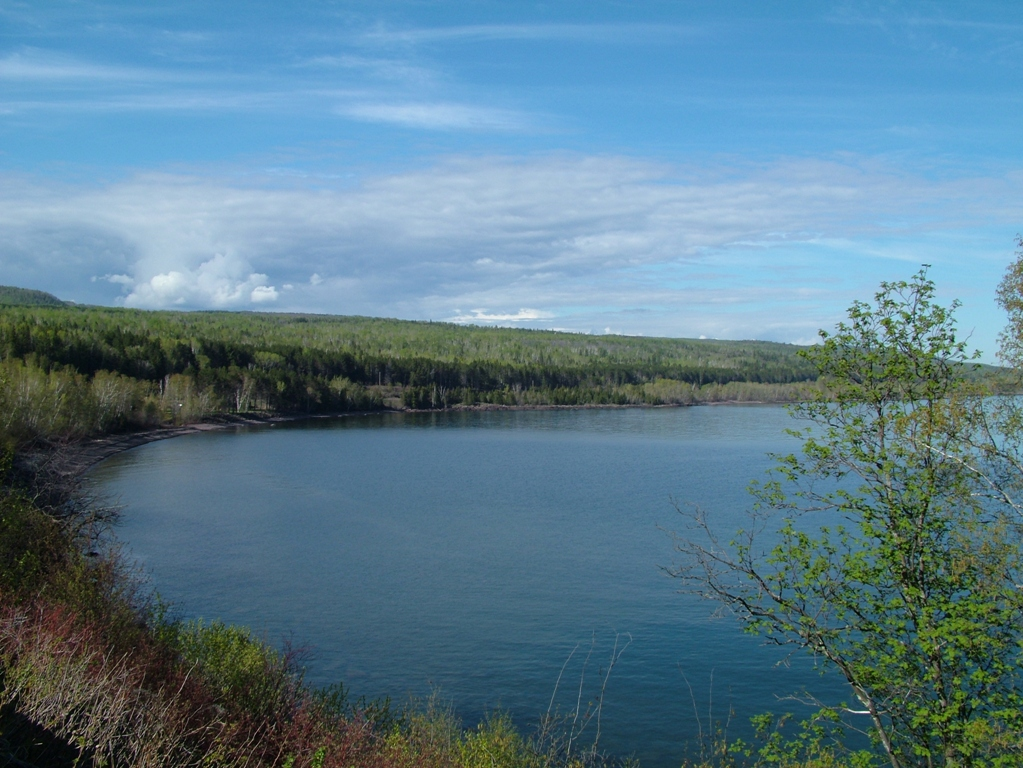
Lake Superior just South of Cascade River State Park
