= Fries Park =

Park in West Virginia, United States

- Interactive map of Fries Park
- Location: Marrtown, West Virginia, United States
- Coordinates: 39.2651°N 81.5612°W
- Established: 1892
- Closed: 1939
- Founder: Gustavus Louis "Gusty" Fries
- Status: Closed

Fries Park was a park established in Marrtown, West Virginia, United States, in 1892 by Gustavus Louis "Gusty" Fries.

== Opening ==
From a Parkersburg newspaper, May 6, 1893:

You Are Invited.

Gusty Fries has provided a place long needed. By hard work and at great expense he has fitted up grounds beautifully located below the city, that is just the thing for public or private picnic parties, dances, excursions, etc. He has the park ready, better and bigger than ever and he will be there tomorrow and will be glad to welcome and entertain any of his friends who care to visit his inviting place. There is no prettier, cooler, or better place for a private or public outing.

The appeal was a family operation where people could relax by picnicking and enjoying square dances and round dances like the polka and schottische in the park's dance pavilion. Fresh crabs were brought in by train from Baltimore, and beer was provided by the Hebrank & Rapp Lager Beer Brewery, the first brewery in the Mid-Ohio Valley. (Louis Hebrank was Fries’s father-in-law, as he had married Hebrank's daughter, Katherine, in 1890.)

== Amenities, events, and scandal ==
The park contained a dance hall, a concession stand where visitors could buy sandwiches and drinks, and a bowling alley, where visitors played duckpins or skittles, using wooden balls. Some exciting stag events, such as beer and crab parties were staged there in the park's early days. Other activities included professional boxing matches, which led to the park’s greatest tragedy.

On June 29, 1899, a boxing match was held at the park between Kid Wanko and Felix Carr. Weighing in at 151 pounds, it was a twenty-round contest, "for points only". In the fifth round, Carr received a blow to the side of the head and fell to the canvas; the fight was over. Though he was able to stand and receive condolences from his opponent, he soon collapsed again. He died the next morning; Kid Wanko was charged with murder. Following an autopsy, it was determined that Carr had several health problems that contributed to his death. The charges against Kid Wanko were dropped.

== Closure ==
Fries Park prospered until increasing use of the automobile made the public more mobile and longing for new sights. The appeal of small local picnic parks decreased, making Fries Park a less profitable concern.

It closed in 1939, four years before the death of Gusty Fries. The main building at the park, the dance hall, was transformed into a house by Fries’s grandson, Lewis V. Moyers. The house changed hands several times, and was eventually dismantled. The only remains of the park is a now dry cistern and the ruins of a bomb shelter built in 1962 in response to the Cuban Missile Crisis. Its memory has lingered on, however, as one of the area's favorite leisure-time places.
