= Vermilion Lake gold rush =

- Date: 1865-1867
- Location: Arrowhead Region, Vermilion Iron Range, Saint Louis County, Minnesota, United States; 47°51′28.47″N 92°17′58.60″W
- Participants: Prospectors
- Outcome: Early iron ore discoveries led to the development of the Minnesotan iron ranges, twenty years later.

The Vermilion Lake gold rush was a small gold rush to Lake Vermilion, Minnesota, when prospectors found small specks of gold in quartz stone in 1865. It was not profitable to try to process this, so the rush ended in 1866, and the prospectors mostly abandoned their land by 1867. Nonetheless, prospectors returned, spreading word of all the iron that they found, leading to the development of the Minnesotan iron ranges twenty years later, most notably in Shirley, Minnesota.
