= Recreation Park (Ontario) =

Park designation in Ontario, Canada

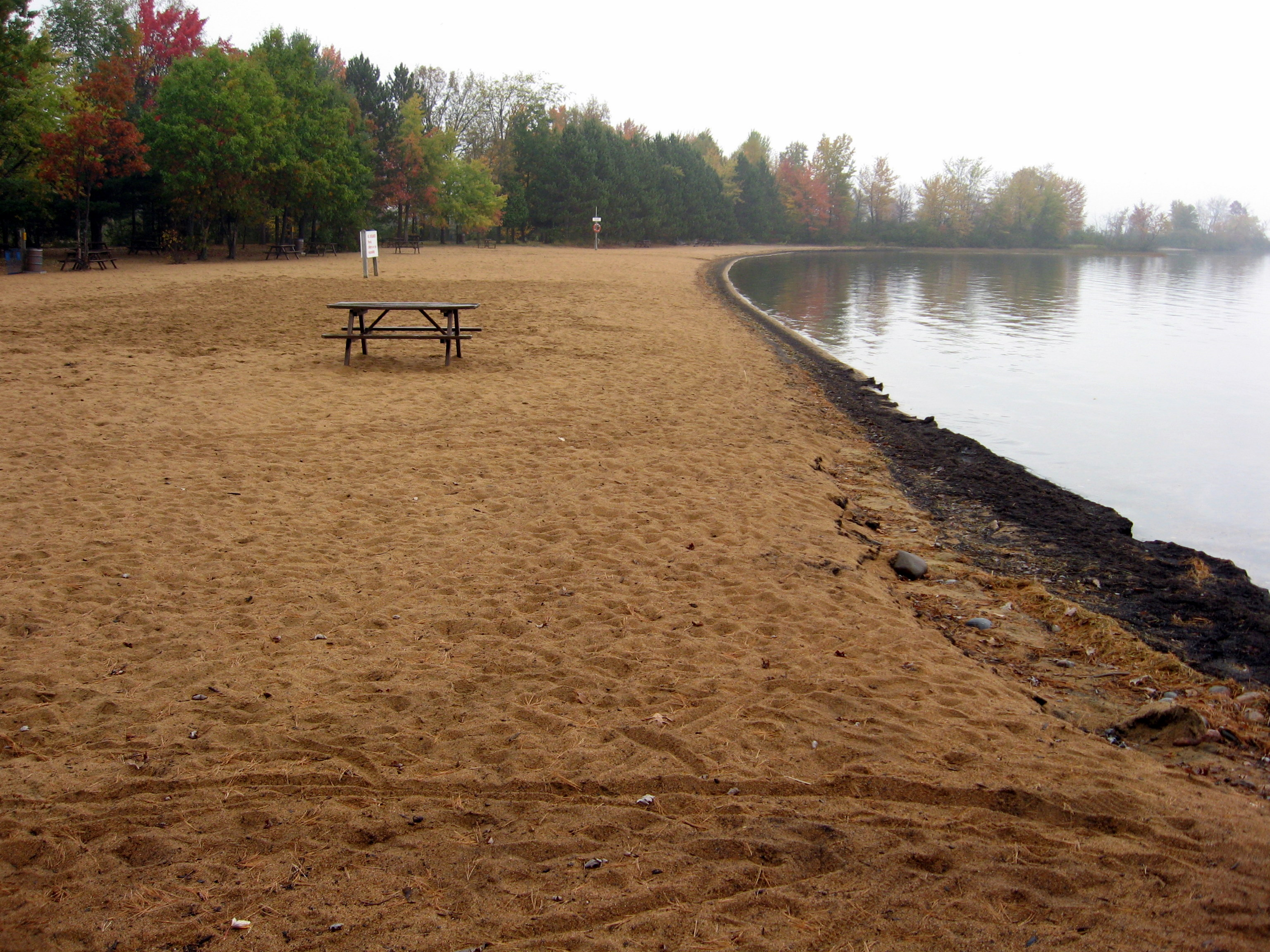
The beach at Bonnechere Provincial Park, a recreation park.

Recreation Park is the classification given by Ontario Parks to provincial parks which are primarily intended for recreation. They usually contain campgrounds, modern facilities, beaches, boat launches, picnic areas, hiking, and other utilities used in modern recreational camping.

== See also ==
- List of Ontario parks
