= Nature Reserve Park (Ontario) =

Park designation in Ontario, Canada

Nature Reserve is the designation given by the Provincial Parks System of Ontario, Canada, for parks which protect specific areas of at risk or unique flora or fauna. Very few are open to the public, and virtually all of them forbid camping, fishing, or any other potentially environmentally hazardous activity.

== See also ==
- List of Ontario parks
