= Brule River (Minnesota) =

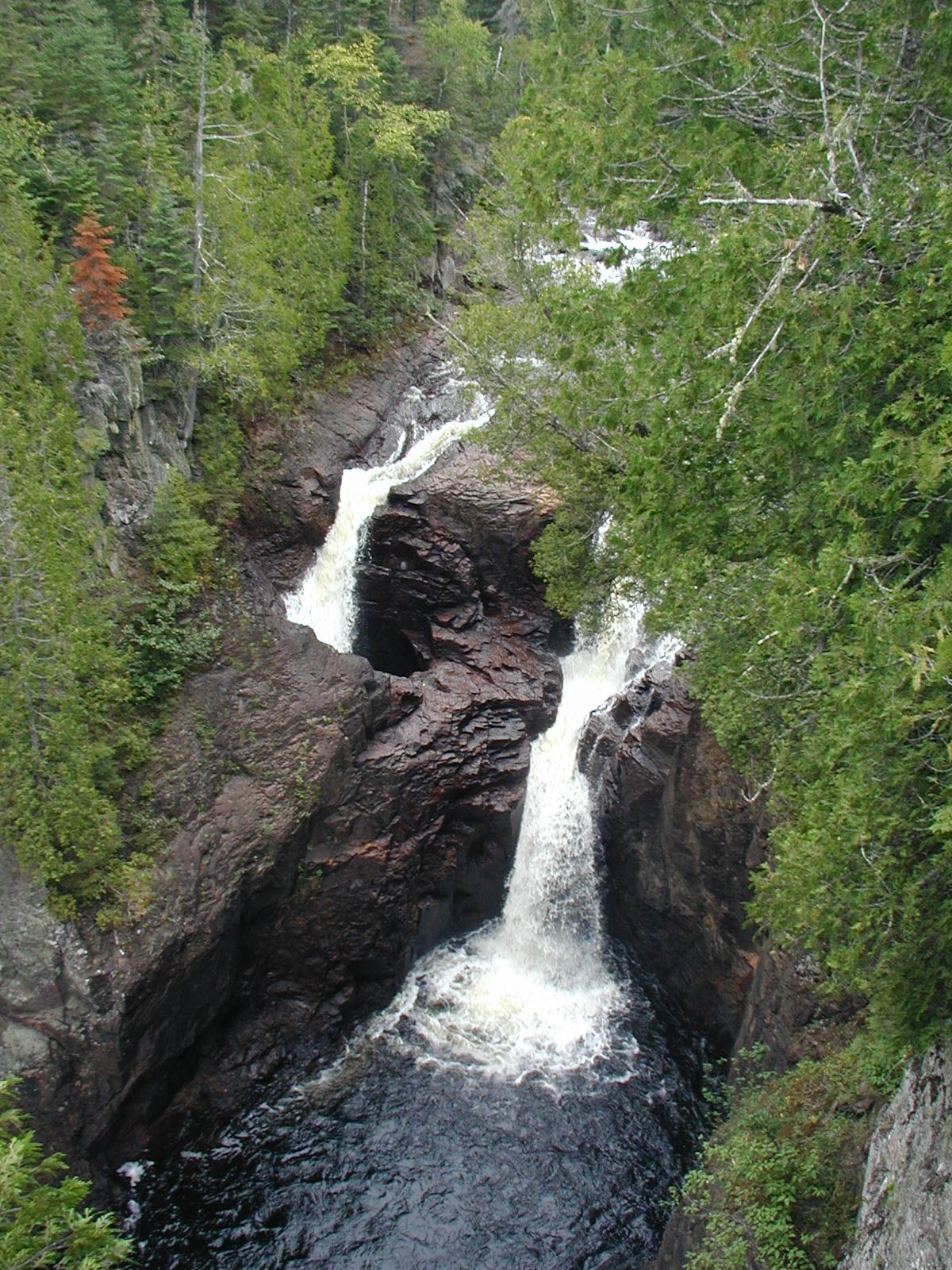
- The Devil's Kettle

- Mouth of the Brule River
- Etymology: burnt (French)
- Native name: Wiisaakode-ziibi (Ojibwe)

Location
- Country: United States
- State: Minnesota
- County: Cook County

Physical characteristics
- Source
  - location: Vista Lake
  - coordinates: 48.0068342°N 90.4723229°W
- Mouth
  - location: Marr Island, Lake Superior
  - coordinates: 47.8165587°N 90.0500980°W
  - elevation: 607 ft (185 m)
- Length: 40.4 miles (65.0 km)

Basin features
- Tributaries
  - left: Mons Creek
  - right: Gauthier Creek

The Brule River is a river of the U.S. state of Minnesota. The Brule River originates at Vista Lake in the Boundary Waters Canoe Area Wilderness and flows 40.4 miles (65.0 km) east and southeast, terminating at Lake Superior approximately 14 mi (23 km) northeast of Grand Marais, Minnesota, within the boundaries of Judge C. R. Magney State Park. A major tributary is the South Brule River, which rises at the east end of Brule Lake in the Boundary Waters Canoe Area Wilderness

The river's original name of Wiisaakode-ziibi (Ojibwe) (Burnt Wood River) may have referenced a forest fire. Brule River is a name derived from the French brulé meaning "burnt"; the English name has lost the diacritic and has an anglicized, monosyllabic pronunciation (/ˈbrul/ BROOL).

Half of the river disappears into a pothole known as "the Devil's Kettle" in Judge C. R. Magney State Park. Studies in 2017 showed that the water comes up at the bottom of the river near the kettle.

== See also ==
- List of rivers of Minnesota
- List of longest streams of Minnesota
