= Edward Wellington Backus =

American businessman (1861–1934)

Edward Wellington Backus (December 1, 1861 – October 29, 1934) was a timber baron, dam builder, mill owner, financier, developer of the northern reaches of Minnesota, and president of the Ontario & Minnesota Power Company and Minnesota and Ontario Paper Company. He was responsible for the construction, commencing in 1905, of a hydroelectric dam at Koochiching Falls between International Falls, Minnesota, and Fort Frances, Ontario, an outpost of the Hudson's Bay Company, which generated much power for the region. It helped drive the paper mill industry of the area, which he also helped finance.

After logging the shoreline timber, his plans to transform the entire Boundary Waters region by building seven dams in the area were opposed by environmentalists, notably Ernest Oberholtzer.

He began his lumbering career in 1882 at the Lee and McCullock Company, which soon became Lee and Backus, and then in 1899 Backus-Brooks Company. He overextended himself in the 1920s and suffered severe losses in the Great Depression, and died of a heart attack in New York in 1934.

Edward W. Backus is the namesake of the city of Backus, Minnesota.
