= Cascade River (Minnesota) =

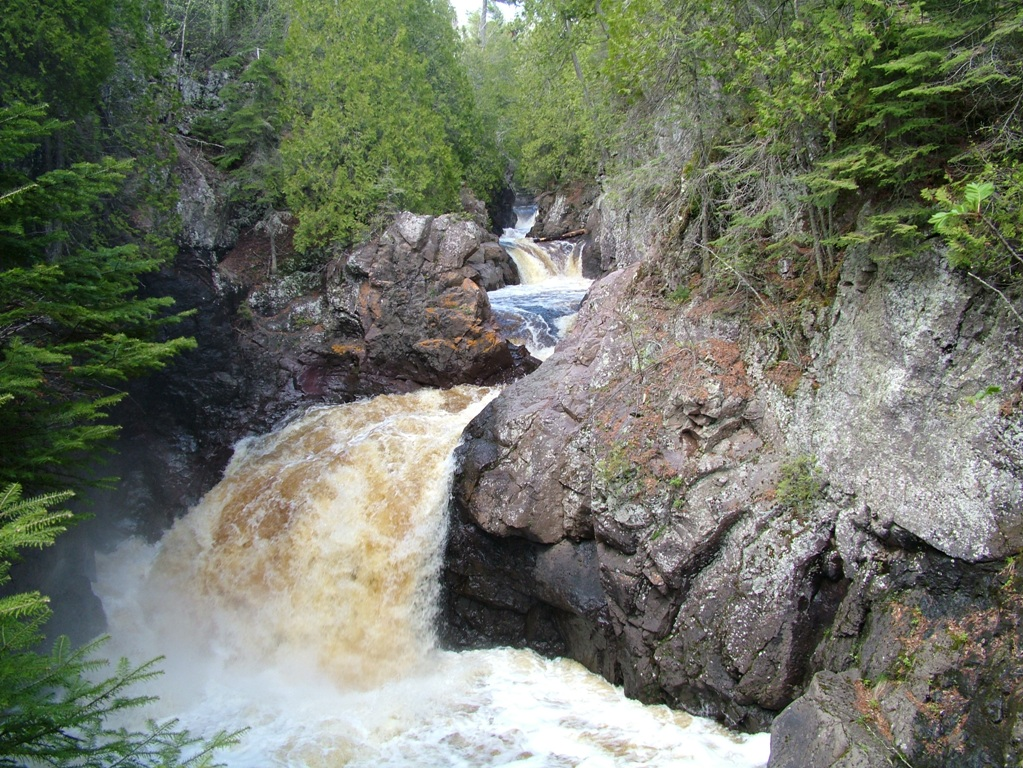
- The Cascade River in Cascade River State Park

- Mouth of the Cascade River
- Native name: Gaa-giishkingwe–ziiibi (Ojibwe)

Location
- Country: United States
- State: Minnesota
- County: Cook County

Physical characteristics
- Source
  - location: Mark Lake
  - coordinates: 47.8698914°N 90.6112262°W
- Mouth
  - location: Deer Yard Lake, Lake Superior
  - coordinates: 47.7068378°N 90.5226208°W
- Length: 17.1 miles (27.5 km)

Basin features
- Tributaries
  - left: McDonald Creek, Thompson Creek, Fry Creek, Nester Creek, Belly Creek, North Branch Cascade River
  - right: Mississippi Creek, Mark Creek
- Waterfalls: Cascade Falls

The Cascade River is a 17.1-mile-long (27.5 km) river in northeastern Minnesota, United States. Running through Cook County, it debouches into Lake Superior between Grand Marais and Lutsen. Its lower courses flow through Cascade River State Park.

The river was named for a number of waterfalls near its mouth. It was originally named "Cut Face River" or Gaa-giishkingwe–ziiibi (Ojibwe).

== See also ==
- List of rivers of Minnesota
