= List of hiking trails in Minnesota =

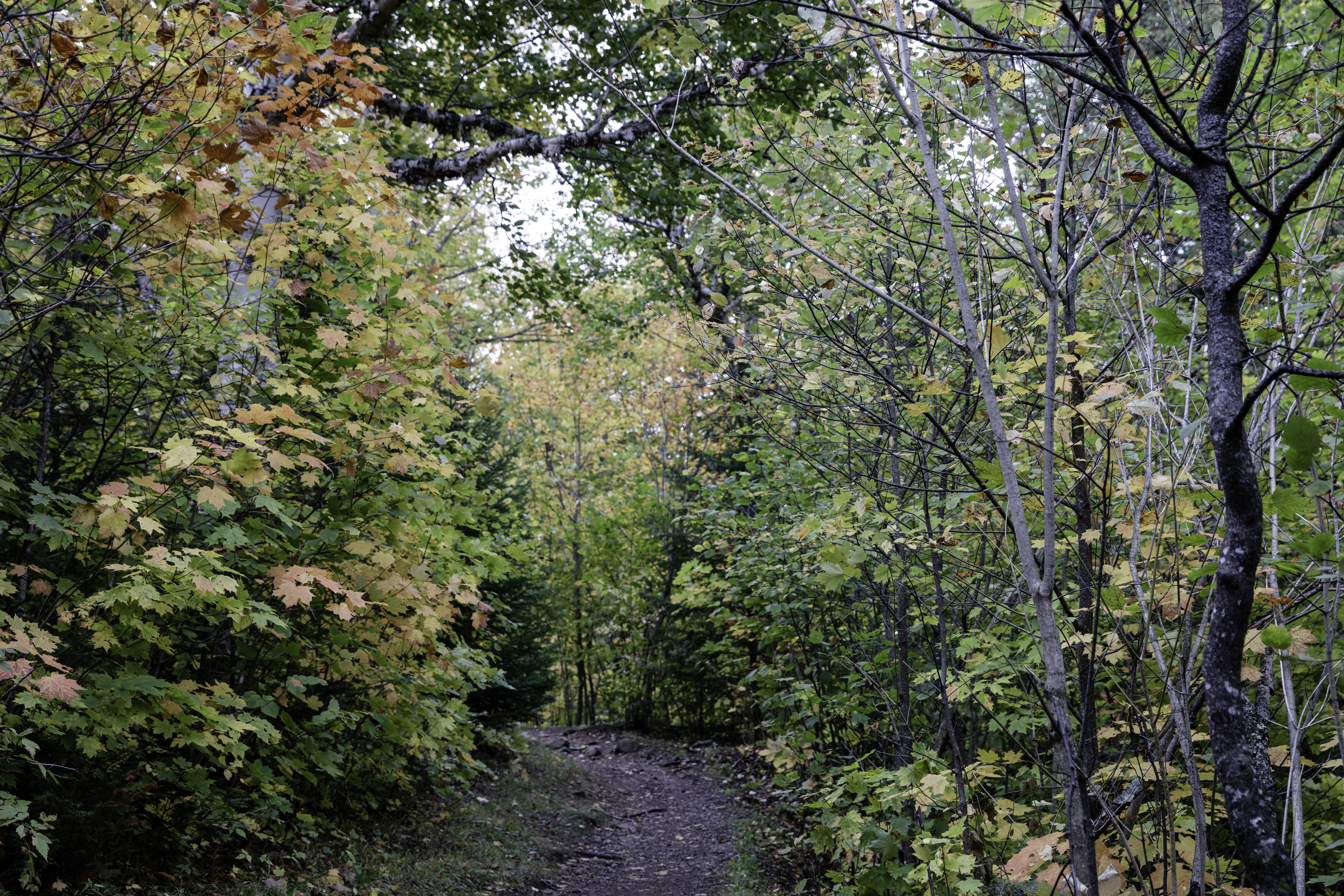
The Oberg Mountain Trail Head in Tofte.

This article presents a list of hiking trails in Minnesota. Trails listed in this article are located within the U.S. state of Minnesota and specifically designated for hiking according to a primary source, or it must be recognized for its hiking significance in reliable secondary sources. Simply accommodating pedestrian activities like walking or running does not merit inclusion in this list. Although the list may feature some multi-use trails and paved paths, the primary focus is on hiking. Therefore, trails predominantly used for other activities such as bicycle paths, sidewalks, snowmobile/ATV trails, urban walkways, and other non-automobile paths are excluded.

== Trails by region ==
=== Central/Metro ===
This section includes trails within the central and metropolitan areas of Minnesota, particularly around the Twin Cities and surrounding suburbs.

- Bruce Vento
- Cannon Valley
- Coldwater Spring
- Crosby Farm to Hidden Falls trail
- Dakota Rail
- Gateway
- Glacial Lakes
- Luce Line
- Minnehaha Falls Lower Glen Trail
- Minnehaha Trail
- Minnesota Valley
- Rush Creek
- Winchell Trail

=== Northeast ===
The northeastern part of Minnesota, particularly along the Iron Range in the Arrowhead Region, is known for its dense forests, lakes, and rugged terrain making it a popular destination for more challenging hiking experiences.

- Arrowhead
- Border Route
- Cut Foot Sioux
- Cuyuna Lakes
- Eagle Mountain
- Gitchi-Gami
- Kekekabic
- North Country
- North Shore
- Sioux–Hustler
- Snowbank
- Superior
- Taconite

=== Northwest ===
Northwest Minnesota is home to the Red River Valley.

- Agassiz
- Central Lakes
- Heartland
- Greater Grand Forks
- Paul Bunyan

=== Southeast ===
These trails are in the southeastern region of Minnesota.

- Big Rivers
- Douglas
- Goodhue Pioneer
- Great River Ridge
- Mill Towns
- Root River
- Shooting Star

=== Southwest ===
Southwestern Minnesota is characterized by its bluff landscapes and river valleys. It includes the Minnesota River Valley and Coteau des Prairies.

- Casey Jones
- Sakatah Singing Hills

== See also ==
- Cycling in Minnesota
- List of Minnesota state forests
- List of Minnesota state parks
- List of rail trails in Minnesota
- List of shared-use paths in Minneapolis
