= Medicine Lake =

Medicine Lake may refer to:

== Places ==
- Medicine Lake Volcano in California, USA
- Medicine Lake, Minnesota
  - Medicine Lake Regional Trail, a bicycle trail
- Medicine Lake, Montana

== Lakes ==
- Medicine Lake (Alberta)
- Medicine Lake (Algoma District) in Algoma District, Ontario
- Medicine Lake (Tustin Township, Kenora District), in Kenora District, Ontario
- Medicine Lake (Haycock Township, Kenora District), in Kenora District, Ontario
- Medicine Lake in Carbon County, Montana
- Medicine Lake in Granite County, Montana
- Medicine Lake in Sheridan County, Montana
- Medicine Lake (Minnesota), a lake near Minneapolis, Minnesota
- Medicine Lake (South Dakota)

== See also ==
- Medicine Grizzly Lake
- Medicine Owl Lake
