= Bassett Creek (Mississippi River tributary) =

Metro Minnesota Watershed

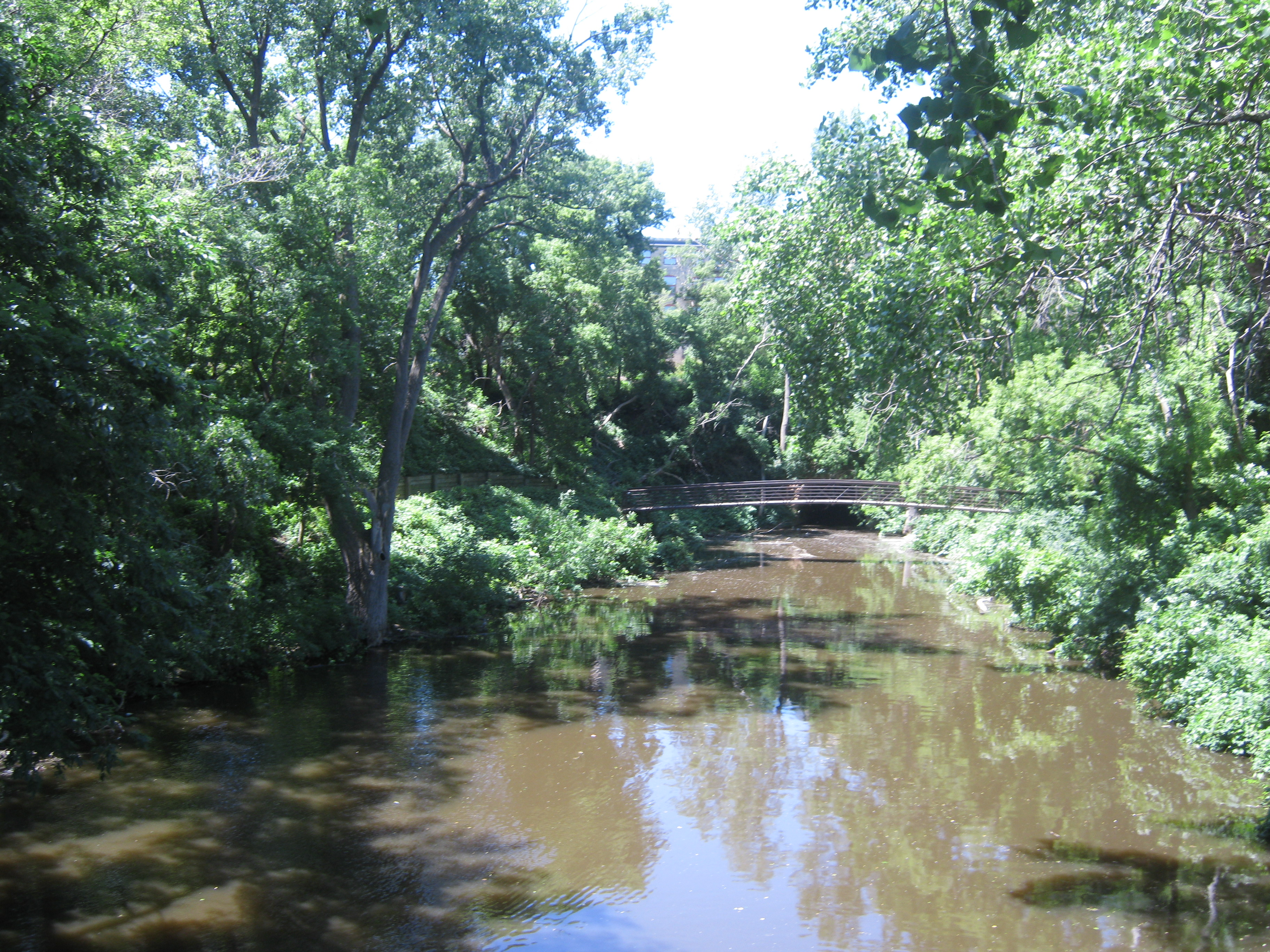
- Native name: Ḣaḣa Wakpadaŋ (Dakota)

Physical characteristics
- Source: Medicine Lake
  - coordinates: 44.99469°N 93.41273°E
- Mouth
  - coordinates: 44.9908°N 93.27245°W
- Length: 12 miles (19 km)
- Basin size: 39 miles (63 km)
- Discharge
  - location: Mississippi River

Basin features
- River system: Mississippi River

Bassett Creek, also known by the Dakota name Ḣaḣa Wakpadaŋ, is a stream in Hennepin County, Minnesota, in the United States. It is a tributary of the Mississippi River.

== History ==
The Dakota name, Ḣaḣa Wakpadaŋ, translated to 'Falls Creek', in reference its closeness to St. Anthony Falls. The creek's English name is for Joel B. Bassett, a settler who moved to Minneapolis in 1850.

By 1867, the stretch of the creek located near downtown Minneapolis had started to become an industrial area. By 1876, it was called a 'mammoth sewer'. It continued to suffer from extreme industrial pollution until the creation of the Minneapolis Parks Board. In 1892, the part of the creek flowing through Minneapolis was straightened, and tunneled. In 1906 Theodore Wirth worked to incorporate part of the creek into the park system. Prior to colonization, a ferry across the river was operated by a woman named Háza Íŋyaŋke Wíŋ, a name that can be translated as "Running Huckleberry Woman".

From 2017 to 2020 a new tunnel was constructed to allow the creek to discharge near the historical discharge location of St. Anthony Falls. The city of Golden Valley is currently continuing a 'Stream Restoration Project' along the creek.

== Route ==
The river begins at Medicine Lake, and flows east. It discharges into the Mississippi River near St. Anthony Falls. The last 1.7 miles are in a tunnel.

The North Branch Bassett Creek originates at Northwood Lake, in New Hope, Minnesota, and meets the main creek in Golden Valley.

== Water Blessing ==
Since 2023, annual water blessing ceremonies for the creek have taken place on Indigenous Peoples' Day. It is organized by a local presbyterian church. It has also been attended by representatives of the Ho-Chunk, Dakota, and Anishinaabe.

== See also ==
- List of rivers of Minnesota
- Nine Mile Creek (Minnesota River tributary)
- Minnehaha Creek
