= Medicine Lake Regional Trail =

Bicycle path in Minnesota

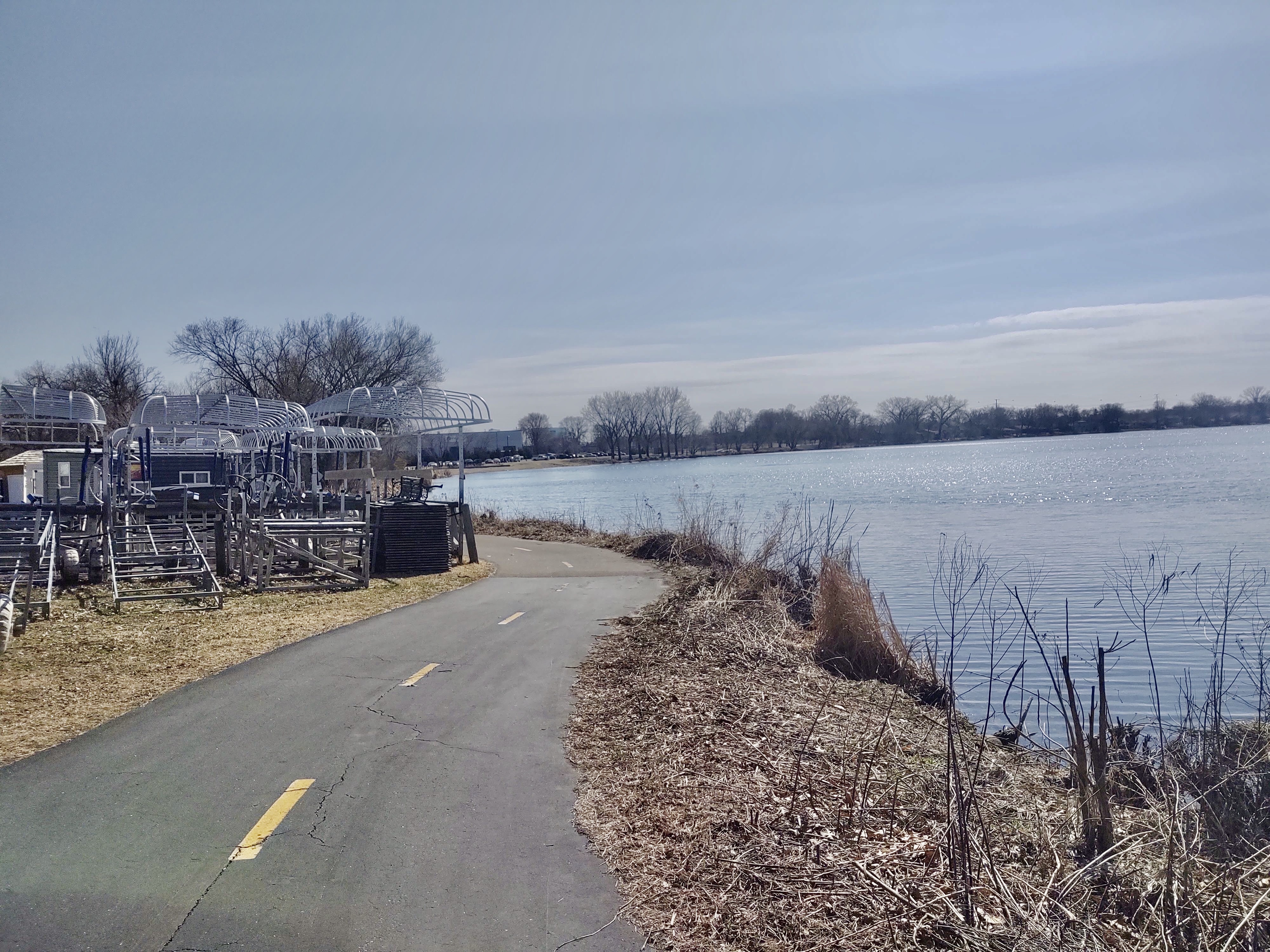
- Looking east, into Medicine Lake
- Length: 8.1 miles (13.0 km)
- Location: Medicine Lake, Plymouth, Maple Grove
- Difficulty: Moderate
- Season: All
- Months: All
- Sights: Marshes, Medicine Lake
- Hazards: Road crossings
- Surface: Asphalt

The Medicine Lake Regional Trail is a bicycle trail that runs from the Medicine Lake Regional Park in Plymouth, Minnesota, to the Elm Creek Park Reserve in Maple Grove. The trail runs for 15.64 miles (25.17 km) and is maintained by Three Rivers Park District.

== Route description ==
The Medicine Lake Regional Trail starts at the Luce Line Regional Trail just south of Medicine Lake in Plymouth. The trail starts heading north on the east side of Medicine Lake. The trail then starts heading through the Medicine Lake Park Reserve. The trail then goes north into northern Plymouth where it has crossings with Rockford Road (County Road 9, CR ), Bass Lake Road (CR 10), and Interstate 494 (I-494). The trail then leaves Plymouth and enters Maple Grove where it has crossings at Weaver Lake Road (CR 109), Elm Creek Boulevard (CR 152), CR 81, and State Highway 610 (MN 610). The trail then ends at the Rush Creek Regional Trail at the Elm Creek Park Reserve.

== History ==
The trail was affected in an August 2006 plan to eliminate confusion on the part of bicyclists using the Three Rivers Park District trail system. In July 2008, the Minnesota Department of Transportation closed the trail's bridge over CR 81 after reports that it was shocking trail users crossing the bridge. MN/DOT concluded that trail users were safe since the level of shock was low, but gave the bridge additional grounding before reopening the bridge. Since then, warning signs have been installed on the approaches to the bridge warning trail users of the risk of shock.

== Crossings ==
City	Trail/Road	Notes
Plymouth	Rockford Road	Crosswalk
Plymouth	Bass Lake Road	Crosswalk
Plymouth	I-494	Overpass/Bridge
Maple Grove	Weaver Lake Road	Crosswalk
Maple Grove	Elm Creek Boulevard	Crosswalk
Maple Grove	CR 81	Overpass/Bridge
Maple Grove	MN 610	Overpass/Bridge
Maple Grove	Rush Creek Regional Trail	End
