= Luce Line Trail =

Shared-use path in Minnesota, US

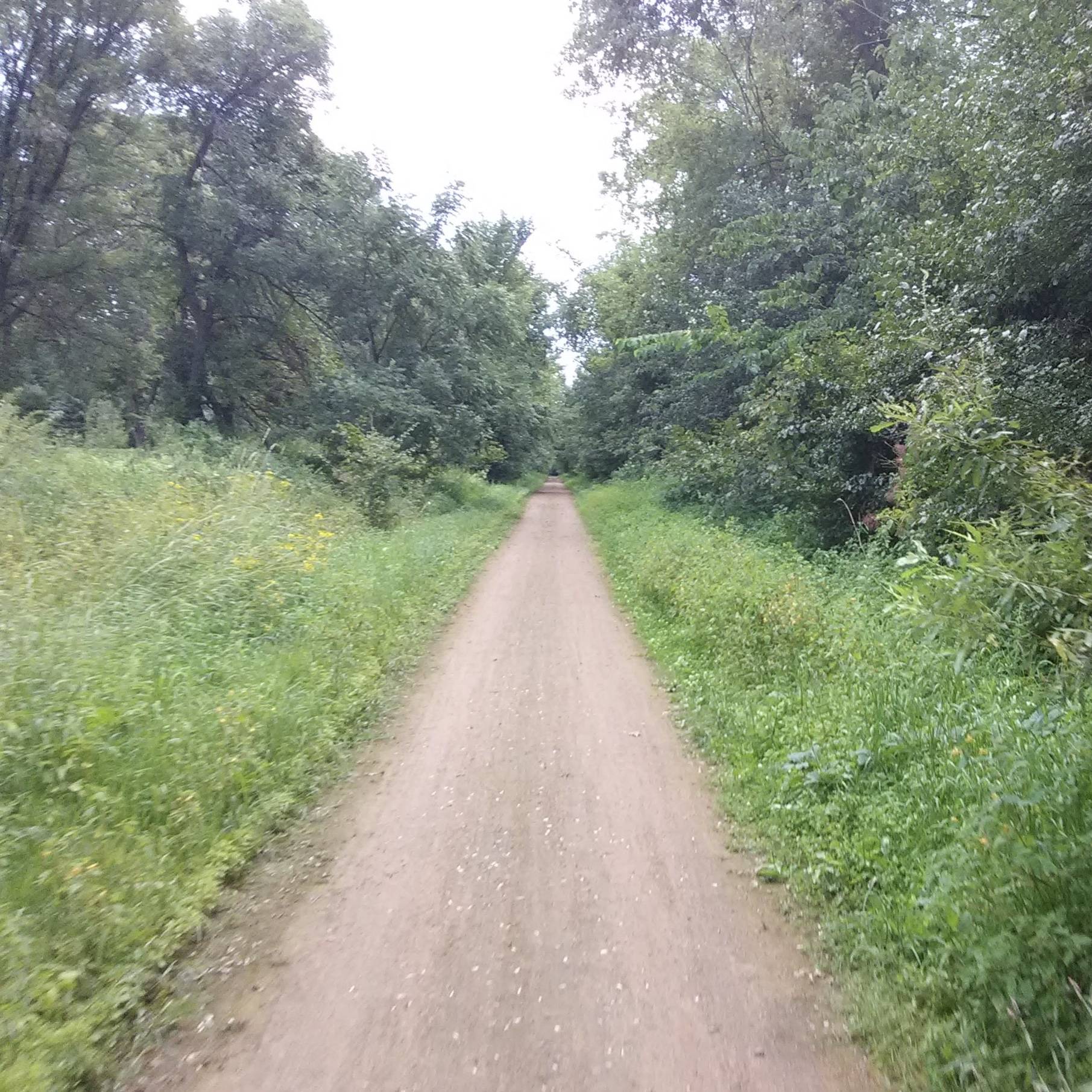
- A natural surface portion of the trail in Independence, Minnesota.
- Length: 74.9 miles (120.5 km)
- Location: Minnesota, United States
- Trailheads: Theodore Wirth Park, Vicksburg Lane, Plymouth, Minnesota; Cosmos, Minnesota
- Use: Cycling, pedestrians, snowmobiles, equestrian
- Elevation gain/loss: 1,538 feet (469 m)
- Grade: Mostly flat
- Difficulty: Easy
- Season: All
- Sights: Farms, sugar maple, basswood, prairie, Lake Minnetonka, Crow River, Winsted Lake
- Hazards: At-grade road crossings
- Surface: Paved, crushed limestone, natural

Luce Line Trail is a 74.9-mile (120.5 km), shared-use path in Minnesota, United States, that stretches from Cosmos to Minneapolis. The trail system was built after 1995 when the Luce Line Railroad was abandoned west of Interstate 494. The previous line extended 104 miles (167 km) to Gluek. The multi-use trail has varying surface features, though it is primarily made up of crushed limestone or aggregate base, and the section from Cosmos to Cedar Mills is undeveloped. The trail is maintained by the Minnesota Department of Natural Resources west of Vicksburg Lane, where it is named Luce Line State Trail. East of Vicksburg Lane, it is maintained by the Three Rivers Park District and named Luce Line Regional Trail.

== Route description ==
=== State trail ===
==== Western portion ====
The trail begins in Cosmos, by Thompson Lake. There is a parking lot, a campground, and facilities. It crosses MN 4 and MN 7, and will parallel MN 7 for 24.5 miles (39.4 km). At this point, the trail leaves the town and is undeveloped with a natural surface. After 10 miles (16 km), it reaches Cedar Mills and transforms into an aggregate surface. It becomes paved and goes by Otter Lake as it enters Hutchinson. It parallels the Crow River and passes under several bridges, including MN 15. It leaves town and crosses over MN 22 on a bridge. It passes under Minnesota Highway 7 again and continues east. It goes south of Swan Lake and into Silver Lake. It leaves Minnesota Highway 7 and continues northeast, and intersects several farm roads. Just west of Winsted, the trail turns south on a new section to avoid the Winsted Airport. The western segment ends at County Road 20. The western segment is 33 miles (53 km) long.

==== Eastern portion ====
After following Winsted streets, the trail passes south of Winsted Lake and a parking lot. It continues due east and passes by several roads. It goes by a parking lot at Vega Avenue. It enters Watertown, and crosses the Crow River. It leaves Watertown and goes by several lakes. It changes directions a few times and goes into the small hamlet of Lyndale in Independence. It crosses county roads 92, 110, and 19, south of Maple Plain. It enters the Lake Minnetonka area and passes by Stubbs Bay. Past this point, no snowmobiles are allowed. The scenery begins to be more suburban, and it crosses local roads. It passes under Brown Road and over Orono Orchard Road. It passes US 12 and the railroad tracks and Wayzata Boulevard on a restored bridge. It goes south, running parallel to US 12 for a while. It passes north of Wayzata, and tunnels under CSAH 101. It passes into Gleason Lake. This section ends at Vicksburg Lane. The eastern segment is 37 miles (60 km) long.

=== Regional trail ===
East of Vicksburg Lane, the trail is paved and known as the Luce Line Regional Trail. It is managed by the Three Rivers Park District. It passes south of Parkers Lake and has several spur trails serving the lake and the surrounding neighborhoods. It enters a tunnel under I-494, and goes by several industries afterward. It crosses Xenium Lane on a bridge and leaves the industrial area. It crosses several defunct railroad crossings. It crosses under MN 55 and turns slightly southeast. It enters the Medicine Lake area. Due to right-of-way issues, the trail narrows to about half its width. This happens for about 0.25 miles (0.40 km), and then the trail goes over two boardwalks. It intersects the Medicine Lake Regional Trail, and parallels 13th Avenue. It goes under US 169. It leaves Plymouth Avenue and goes back to the railway tracks. It crosses Winnetka Avenue and turns south to avoid the Golden Valley Country Club. It turns east again, paralleling Country Club Drive and turns north on Douglas Drive. It crosses the Canadian Pacific Railway tracks and crosses under MN 100 and avoids a pond by circling south. It goes by Schaper Park and goes into Theodore Wirth Park. It intersects several mountain bike trails, and ends at Theodore Wirth Parkway. The Three Rivers Park District regional trail segment is 9 miles (14 km) long.

=== Minneapolis portion ===
From the east end of the Regional Trail the Minneapolis Parks segment of the Luce Line Trail takes a rather zig-zag route for around 2.7 miles through Theodore Wirth Park and into Minneapolis. The trail takes several turns along Theodore Wirth Parkway, Highway 55, Glenwood Avenue, Thomas Avenue, Bassett Creek Park, Chestnut Avenue, Cedar Lake Road, Bryn Mawr Meadows Park, and Van White Memorial Blvd to eventually connect with the Cedar Lake Trail near downtown Minneapolis.

== History of the trail ==
The Electric Short Line Railway was a system that was built from 1917-1927. It extended from Minneapolis to Gluek, serving the small towns in between. The railway changed hands a few times before being abandoned throughout the late 1960s to early 1970s. The Luce Line State Trail was completed west of Plymouth after the line was abandoned in 1972.

20 miles (32 km) of the DNR Segment was paved in 2014, from Winsted to Hutchinson. The project cost $2.2 million, and is the longest paved section built at one time by the DNR. The DNR hopes to pave the entire trail east of Hutchinson.

== See also ==
- Cycling in Minnesota
- Rail trail
