= Maris Sidenstecker =

American marine biologist and anti-whaling activist

Maris Sidenstecker (died 2023) was an American marine biologist and anti-whaling activist. In 1974, she cofounded the nonprofit organization Save the Whales with her 14 year old daughter. Her daughter designed a T-shirt with a drawing of a blue whale and "Save the whales" printed on it, helping popularize the cause.

Sidenstecker was born in Minneapolis and grew up in Medicine Lake, Minnesota. Her father was a traveling salesman. She studied at the University of Minnesota from 1953 to 1954.

She died in Monterey County, California in 2023.
