= Cedar Mills, Minnesota =

City in Minnesota, United States

- City
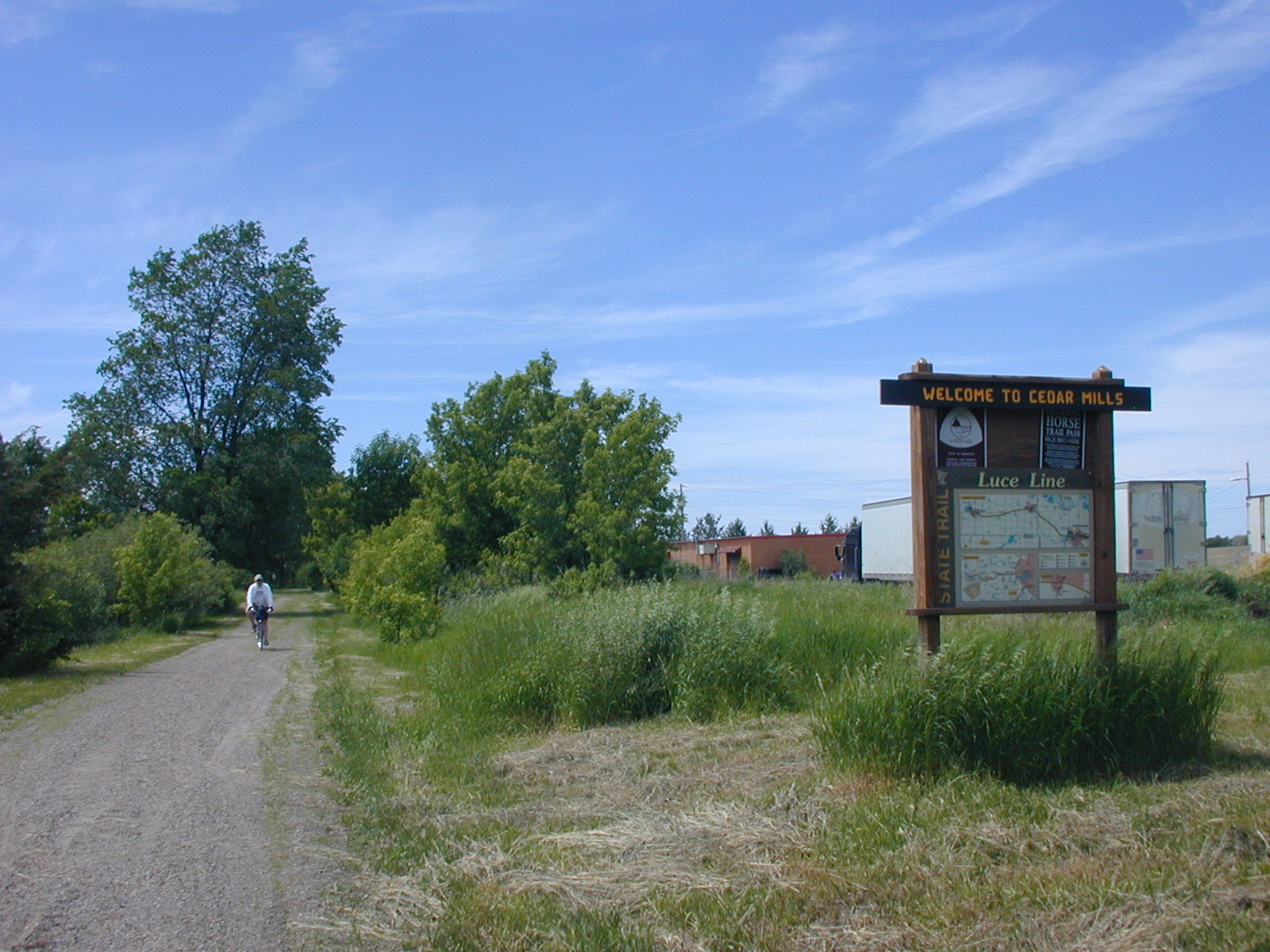
- Luce Line Bike-Walk Trail

- Location in Meeker County and the state of Minnesota
- Coordinates: 44°56′34″N 94°31′12″W
- Country: United States
- State: Minnesota
- County: Meeker

Area
  - Total: 0.32 sq mi (0.83 km^{2})
  - Land: 0.32 sq mi (0.83 km^{2})
  - Water: 0 sq mi (0.00 km^{2})
- Elevation: 1,093 ft (333 m)

Population (2020)
  - Total: 62
  - Density: 194.0/sq mi (74.89/km^{2})
- Time zone: UTC-6 (Central (CST))
  - Summer (DST): UTC-5 (CDT)
- ZIP Code: 55350 (Hutchinson)
- FIPS code: 27-10468
- GNIS feature ID: 2393775

Cedar Mills is a city in Meeker County, Minnesota, United States. The population was 62 at the 2020 census.

== History ==
Cedar Mills was laid out in 1860, and named for nearby Cedar Lake. A post office called Cedar Mills was established in 1870 and remained in operation until 1955.

== Geography ==
Cedar Mills is in southern Meeker County and is surrounded by the eastern part of Cedar Mills Township. Minnesota State Highway 7 passes through the north side of the community, leading southeast 9 miles (14 km) to Hutchinson and west 8 miles (13 km) to Cosmos. Litchfield, the Meeker county seat, is 14 miles (23 km) to the north. County Highway 26 runs south from MN 7 through the center of Cedar Mills. The Luce Line State Trail passes through the city.

According to the U.S. Census Bureau, Cedar Mills has a total area of 0.32 square miles (0.83 km^{2}), all of it recorded as land. The South Fork of the Crow River runs along the southwest border of the city, flowing southeasterly toward Hutchinson.

== Demographics ==
Historical population
| Census | Pop. | Note | %± |
|---|---|---|---|
| 1950 | 99 | | — |
| 1960 | 96 | | −3.0% |
| 1970 | 81 | | −15.6% |
| 1980 | 73 | | −9.9% |
| 1990 | 80 | | 9.6% |
| 2000 | 53 | | −33.7% |
| 2010 | 45 | | −15.1% |
| 2020 | 62 | | 37.8% |
U.S. Decennial Census

=== 2010 census ===
As of the census of 2010, there were 45 people, 23 households, and 14 families residing in the city. The population density was 132.4 inhabitants per square mile (51.1/km^{2}). There were 24 housing units at an average density of 70.6 per square mile (27.3/km^{2}). The racial makeup of the city was 93.3% White, 2.2% Asian, and 4.4% from two or more races.

There were 23 households, of which 13.0% had children under the age of 18 living with them, 52.2% were married couples living together, 8.7% had a female householder with no husband present, and 39.1% were non-families. 39.1% of all households were made up of individuals, and 17.4% had someone living alone who was 65 years of age or older. The average household size was 1.96 and the average family size was 2.57.

The median age in the city was 49.3 years. 13.3% of residents were under the age of 18; 6.7% were between the ages of 18 and 24; 24.3% were from 25 to 44; 35.6% were from 45 to 64; and 20% were 65 years of age or older. The gender makeup of the city was 35.6% male and 64.4% female.

=== 2000 census ===
As of the census of 2000, there were 53 people, 26 households, and 15 families residing in the city. The population density was 121.8 inhabitants per square mile (47.0/km^{2}). There were 27 housing units at an average density of 62.0 per square mile (23.9/km^{2}). The racial makeup of the city was 100.00% White.

There were 26 households, out of which 23.1% had children under the age of 18 living with them, 46.2% were married couples living together, 7.7% had a female householder with no husband present, and 42.3% were non-families. 42.3% of all households were made up of individuals, and 11.5% had someone living alone who was 65 years of age or older. The average household size was 2.04 and the average family size was 2.80.

In the city, the population was spread out, with 22.6% under the age of 18, 5.7% from 18 to 24, 30.2% from 25 to 44, 17.0% from 45 to 64, and 24.5% who were 65 years of age or older. The median age was 41 years. For every 100 females, there were 96.3 males. For every 100 females age 18 and over, there were 95.2 males.

The median income for a household in the city was $36,875, and the median income for a family was $51,875. Males had a median income of $35,000 versus $23,750 for females. The per capita income for the city was $17,998. None of the population and none of the families were below the poverty line.

== Gallery ==
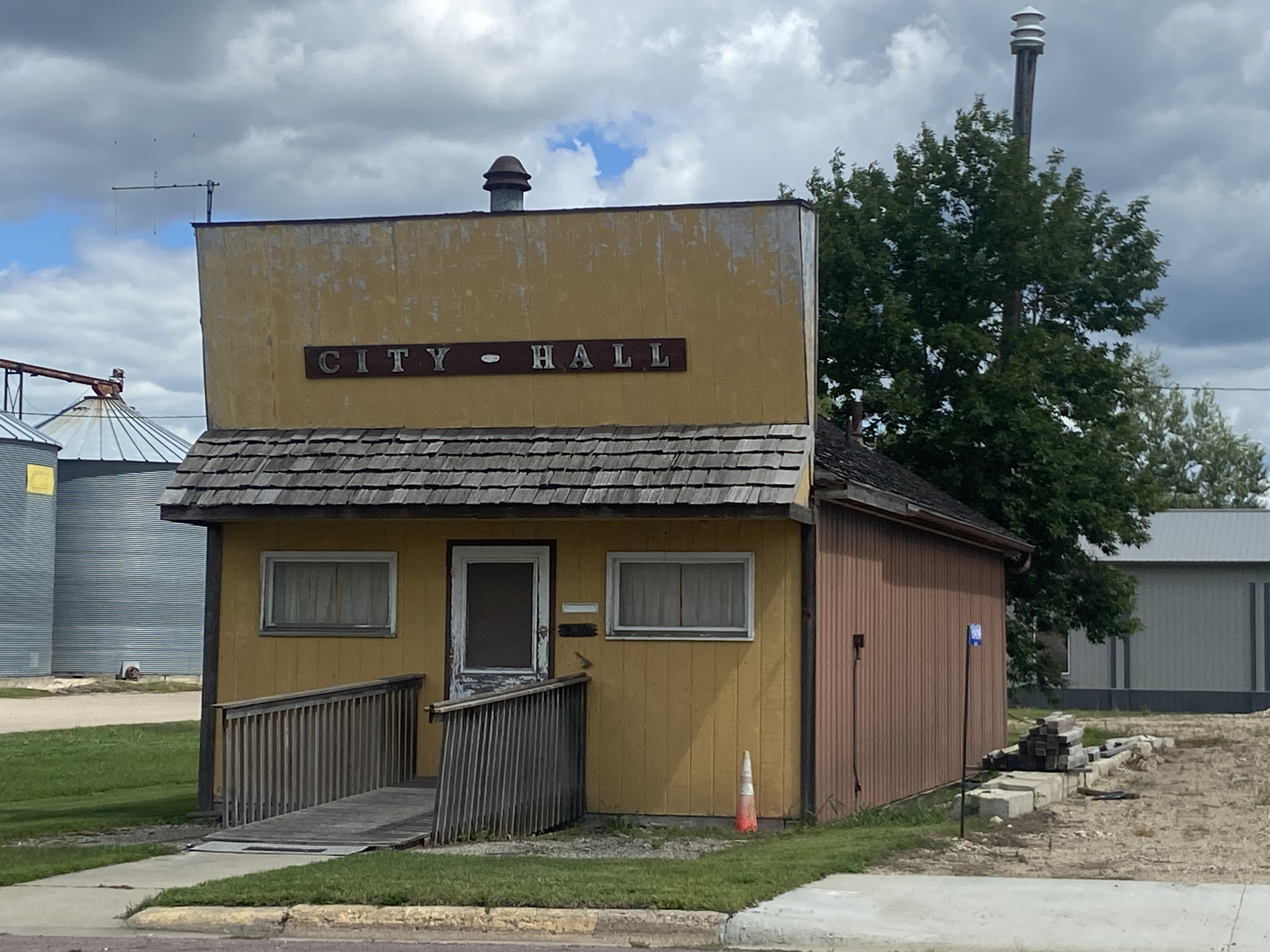
City Hall

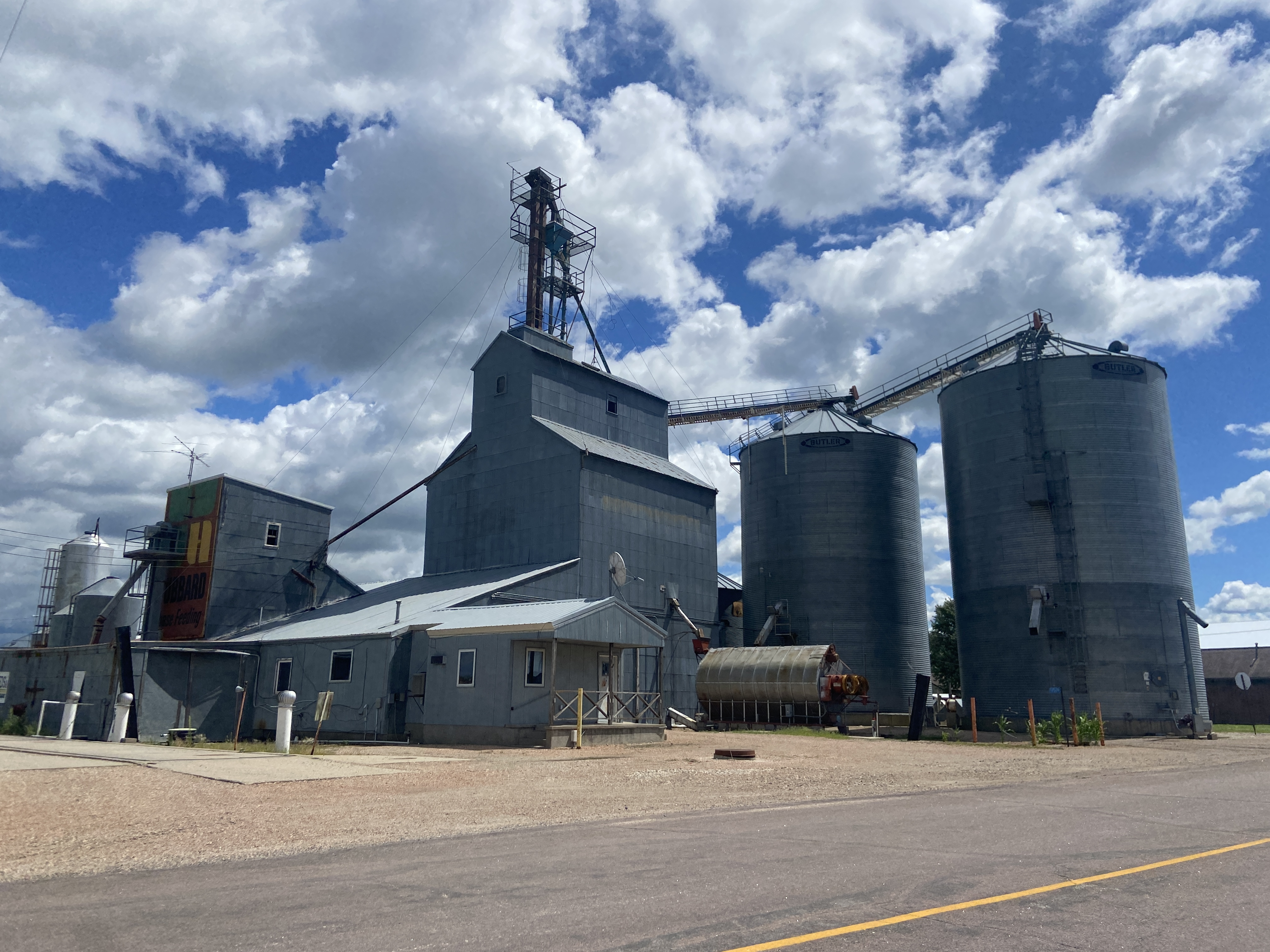
Grain elevators

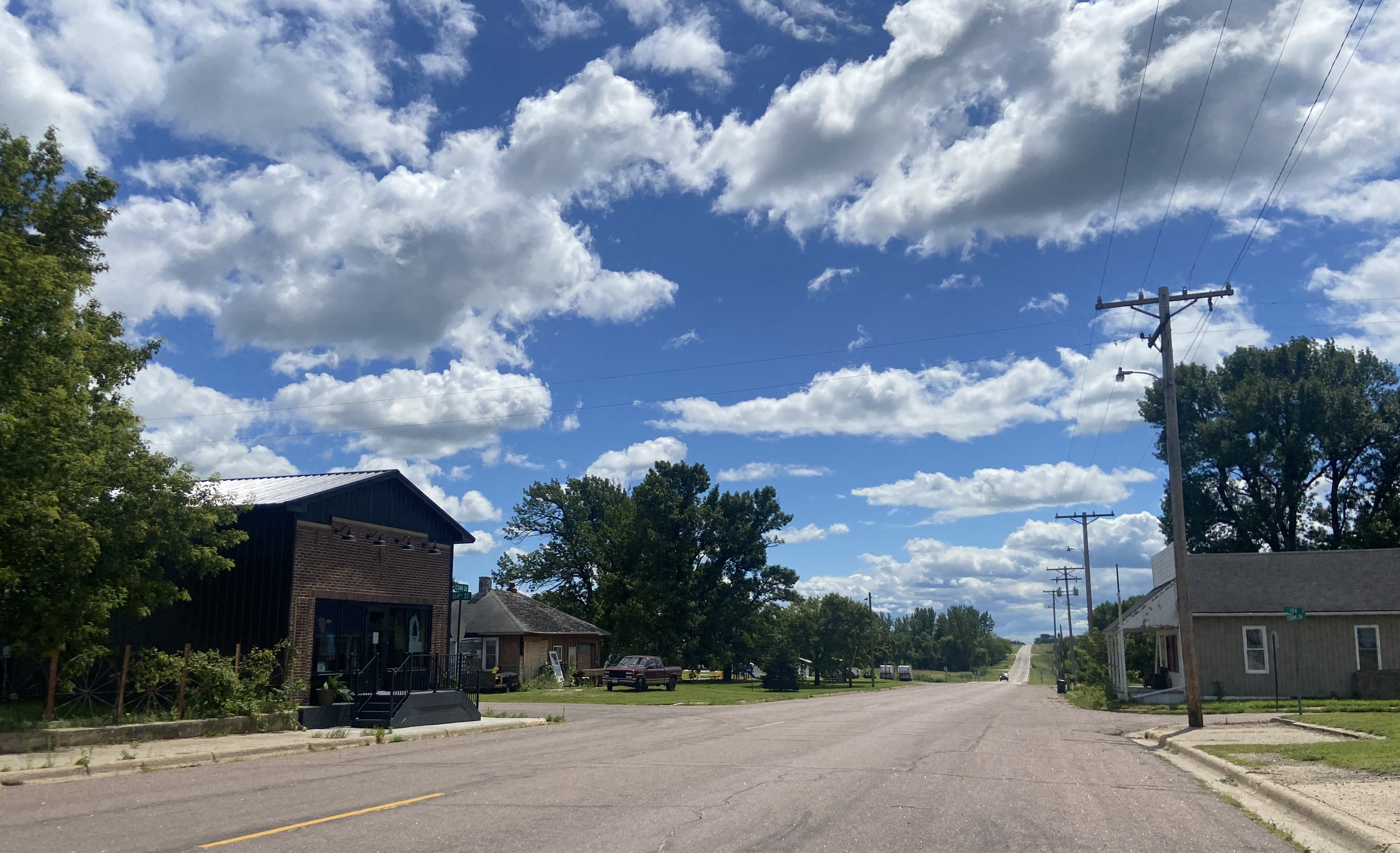
620th Avenue (Cty Rd 26)

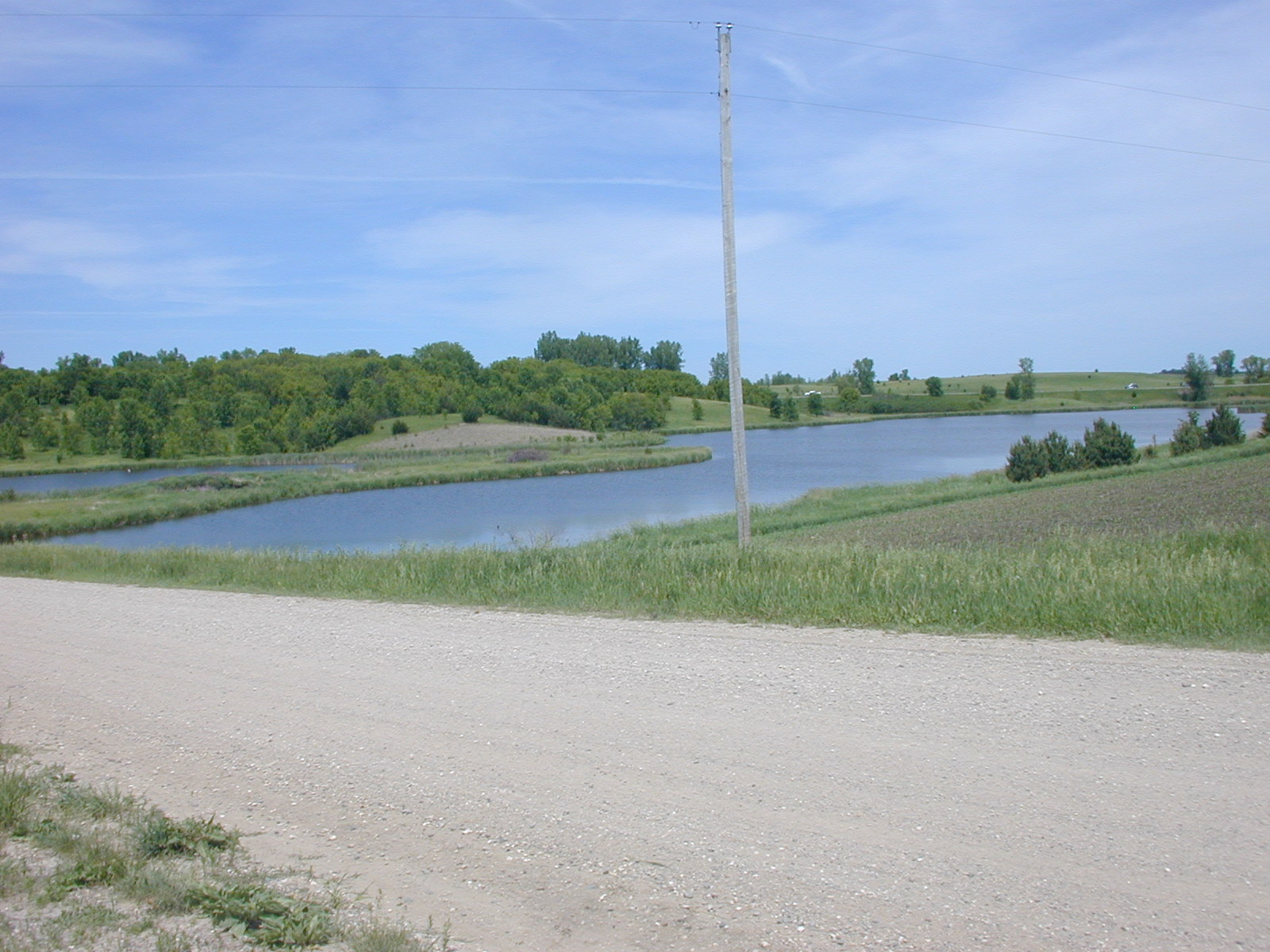
Luce Line Trail
