= List of rail trails in Minnesota =

Minnesota rail trails are former railway lines that have been converted to paths designed for pedestrian, bicycle, skating, equestrian, and/or light motorized traffic. Rail trails are multi-use paths offering at least pedestrians and cyclists recreational access to the routes.

- Agassiz Recreational Trail
- Big Rivers Regional Trail
- Blue Ox Trail
- Blufflands State Trail:
  - Harmony-Preston segment
  - Root River segment
- Brown's Creek State Trail
- Bruce Vento Regional Trail
- Cannon Valley Trail
- Cedar Lake Trail
- Central Lakes Trail
- Dakota Rail Regional Trail
- Douglas State Trail
- Gateway State Trail
- Glacial Lakes State Trail
- Goodhue Pioneer State Trail
- Hardwood Creek Regional Trail
- Hiawatha LRT Trail
- Heartland State Trail
- Lake Wobegon Trails
- Luce Line State Trail
- Midtown Greenway
- Min Hi Line
- Paul Bunyan Trail
- Sakatah Singing Hills State Trail
- Soo Line Trail
- Southwest LRT Trail
- Sunrise Prairie Trail
- Wapiti Trail
- Willard Munger State Trail

== See also ==
- List of rail trails
- List of hiking trails in Minnesota
