= Cycling in Minnesota =

Form of recreation in Minnesota

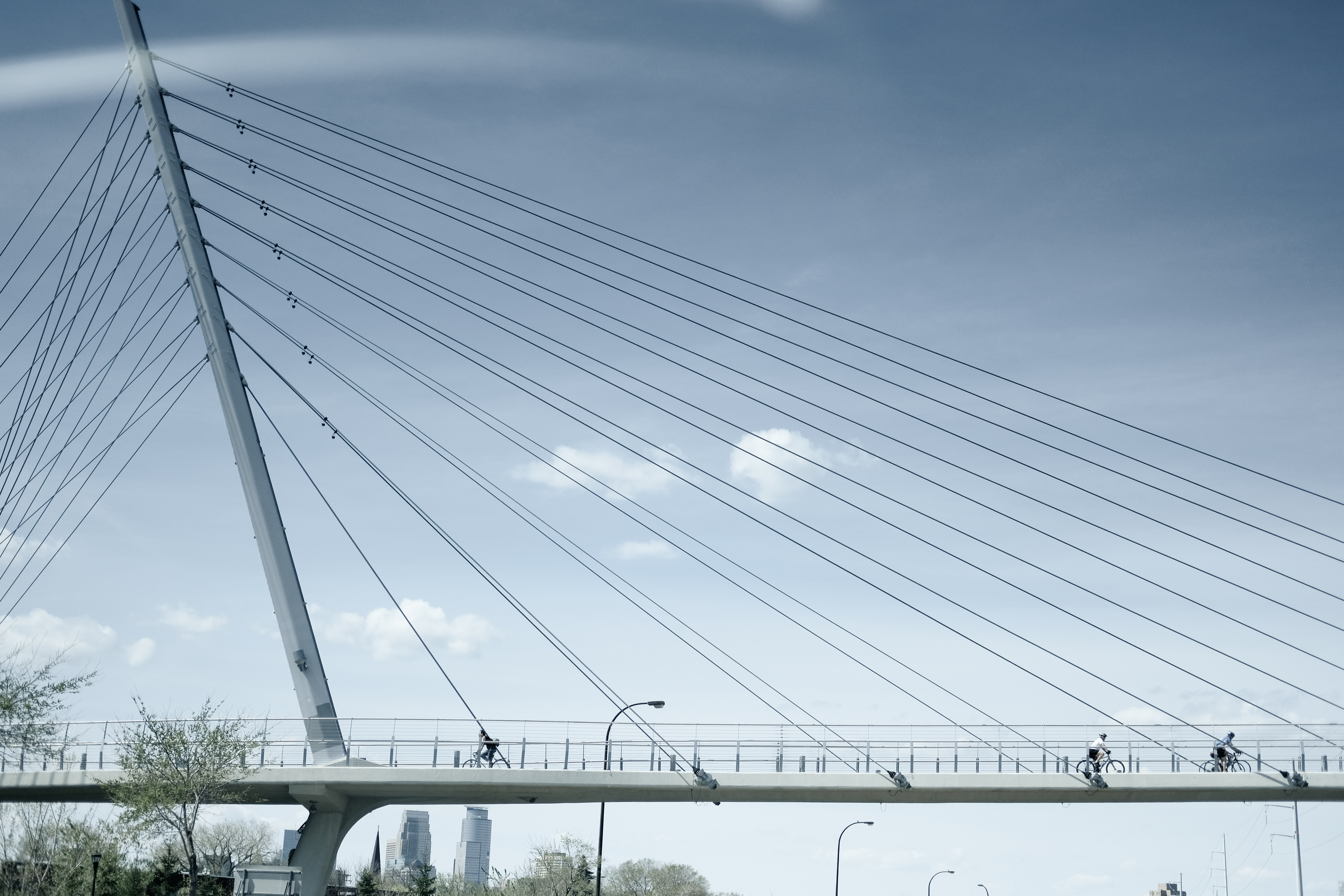
Bicyclists crossing the Martin Olav Sabo Bridge in Minneapolis

Cycling in Minnesota is a popular form of recreation, commuting, and competitive sport that has grown in prominence over the years. It has been a popular activity in the state since the late 19th century.

Minnesota offers an expansive network of cycling routes and bike-friendly amenities. The state has developed a variety of cycling paths, including urban routes, long-distance trails, and mountain biking terrains. Cycling in Minnesota is supported by an active community of cyclists, advocacy groups, and public initiatives aimed at improving cycling infrastructure and safety.

Minnesota was ranked as the 2nd most bicycle-friendly state by the League of American Bicyclists in 2017. Much of the state's bicycle culture is centered in Minneapolis, the state's largest city, but the extensive network of trails has helped make cycling common throughout the state.

== History ==
Bicycles were a popular means of personal transportation in the U.S. and Europe in the late 19th and early 20th centuries before the automobile became more widely available. As in many other states, bicyclists in Minnesota were early backers of the Good Roads Movement. Cyclists also formed clubs to gather and hold competitions. In the 1890s, Minnehaha Park in Minneapolis became home to a mile-long cycling track that was used for racing. Minneapolis was already building an extensive park system during this time, which was built upon during succeeding generations—including a significant amount of help during the Great Depression when the Civilian Conservation Corps made improvements. Today, a nearly continuous system of parkways, bike paths, and pedestrian walkways encircle the city as the Grand Rounds Scenic Byway. Other cities, particularly Twin Cities suburbs have also built large networks of bike paths, but it's an idea that has spread to other places such as Rochester, which has about as much park land as Minneapolis despite having a significantly smaller population.

Cycling gained new life during the bike boom of the 1960s and 1970s. During this period, many bike shops in Minnesota were established, including Penn Cycle in Richfield, which became the first dealer for Trek bicycles in the late 1970s. Erik's Bike Shop, another Richfield-based chain, opened its first store in 1977. Minnesota capitalized on its rich railroading history by transforming half of the state's abandoned rail lines into cycling trails. The Heartland State Trail, opened in 1977, was Minnesota's first paved rail trail.

Trail building in the state has continued rapidly since then, with various organizations including the Minnesota Department of Natural Resources (DNR), counties, cities, and non-profits contributing to the development. Many of these trails are multi-use, accommodating activities like hiking, horseback riding, and mountain biking, as well as wintertime activities like skiing and snowmobiling. Notably, trails like the Root River Trail have revitalized small towns by promoting tourism.

During the 1980s, Minneapolis became the home of the Rollerblade company, which popularized inline skating. Inline skaters benefited from the smoothly paved trails, and the activity became part of the state's recreational landscape. In the same decade, cyclist Greg LeMond, who had moved to Minnesota, became the first American to win the Tour de France, doing so three times in 1986, 1989, and 1990.

In the mid-1990s, the Yellow Bike Coalition formed in the Twin Cities and initiated one of the region's first bike-sharing programs. Despite initial enthusiasm, the program eventually folded due to vandalism and theft. Some supporters of this initiative later established the Sibley Bike Depot, a non-profit community bike shop, in Saint Paul in 2001. A more successful bike-sharing program, Nice Ride Minnesota, began in 2010 but faced financial challenges in the wake of competing scooter-sharing services. The program was eventually shut down in 2023 when Lyft, which had taken over its operations, lost its sponsorship with the Blue Cross and Blue Shield of Minnesota.

== Geography and trails ==
=== Urban cycling ===
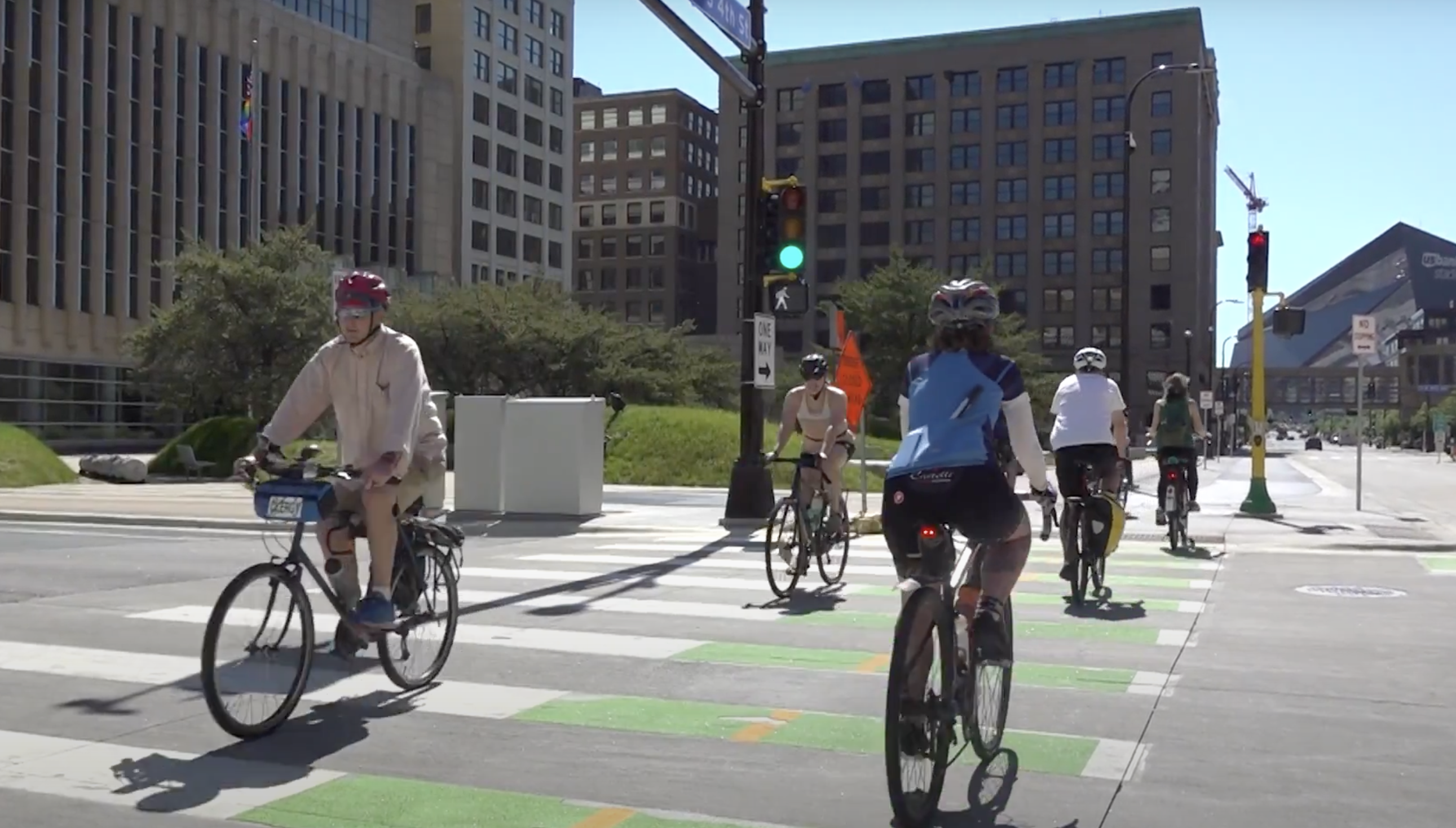
Cyclists crossing 3rd Ave S in downtown Minneapolis

Cities like Minneapolis and St. Paul offer extensive bike lanes, cycling programs, and bike-sharing systems. Minneapolis, in particular, has been consistently ranked as one of the most bike-friendly cities in the United States. In 2023, Minneapolis topped the City Ratings program's list of best large U.S. cities for cycling. A cornerstone of Minneapolis's cycling infrastructure is its extensive urban cycling network. Central to this network is the Grand Rounds Scenic Byway, a continuous 51-mile (82 km) loop of off-street bike trails encircling the city. Established over a century ago, the byway serves both recreational and transportation purposes for cyclists, pedestrians, and other non-motorized users. The city has expanded this network by repurposing former rail corridors into additional trails, such as the Midtown Greenway, Cedar Lake Trail, Hiawatha LRT Trail, and Dinkytown Greenway. As of 2023, Minneapolis boasts 21 miles (34 km) of on-street protected bike lanes and 106 miles (171 km) of off-street trails and sidewalks. The city aims to expand to 141 miles (227 km) of upgraded, all-ages-and-abilities bikeways by 2030.

According to ACS 5-year estimates, about 4.0% of Minneapolis residents traveled to and from work via bicycle in 2019. This declined to 3.3% in 2020, 2.9% in 2021, and 2.6% in 2022. The 1-year estimate for 2023 found this had dropped further to 1.8%. The decline may be due in part to the increased popularity of remote work in the wake of the COVID-19 pandemic. Across Minnesota as a whole, 0.48% of commuters traveled via bicycle, down from a 2014 peak of 0.89%.

=== Long-distance trails ===
Minnesota offers several long-distance trails. Trails have been built by many different organizations across the state. While the Minnesota Department of Natural Resources (DNR) operates a system of State Trails, counties, cities, and non-profit organizations have also worked to build bike paths. Most trails operated by the DNR are multi-use trails, supporting a range of activities including hiking, horseback riding, mountain biking, and wintertime activities like skiing and snowmobiling. Minneapolis was also home to the Rollerblade company, which popularized inline skating in the 1980s.

Some of the popular cycle routes include:

- The Paul Bunyan State Trail: One of the longest paved trails in the U.S., stretching over 120 miles.
- The Root River Trail: A scenic 42-mile trail running through limestone bluffs and dense forests.
- The Mesabi Trail: Covering over 135 miles, this trail connects the cities of Grand Rapids and Ely.

For off-road enthusiasts, destinations like the Cuyuna Country State Recreation Area offer challenging terrains and are known for their mountain biking trails.

=== United States Bicycle Route System ===
Cyclist path sign for the Mississippi River Trail

The United States Bicycle Route System, a national network using existing roads and trails, is in its early planning stages in Minnesota. According to an April 2010 plan by the Adventure Cycling Association, five U.S. Bicycle Routes are anticipated to pass through the state, all converging in the Twin Cities region. These include three east–west corridors: U.S. Bicycle Route 10 (USBR 10), U.S. Bicycle Route 20 (USBR 20), and U.S. U.S. Bicycle Route 30 (USBR 30). Additionally, two north–south corridors are designated: U.S. Bicycle Route 41 (USBR 41) and U.S. Bicycle Route 45 (USBR 45).

USBR 45 is expected to largely parallel the present Mississippi River Trail, while USBR 41 is planned to diverge near the Twin Cities, passing through Duluth and extending up the North Shore of Lake Superior. USBR 45 became the first route to receive official designation in Minnesota, achieving this milestone in 2012. Signage for the route was completed in 2013.

Though planning for these routes in Minnesota had a late start compared to states like Michigan and Wisconsin, the Minnesota Department of Transportation is actively working to integrate these national routes into the state's existing cycling infrastructure.

== See also ==
- Greg LeMond, the first American to win the Tour de France who lived in Minnesota
- List of hiking trails in Minnesota
- List of rail trails in Minnesota
- Trails in Minneapolis
