= Superior Hiking Trail =

Trail in Minnesota

Coordinates: 47°34′25″N 90°50′10″W

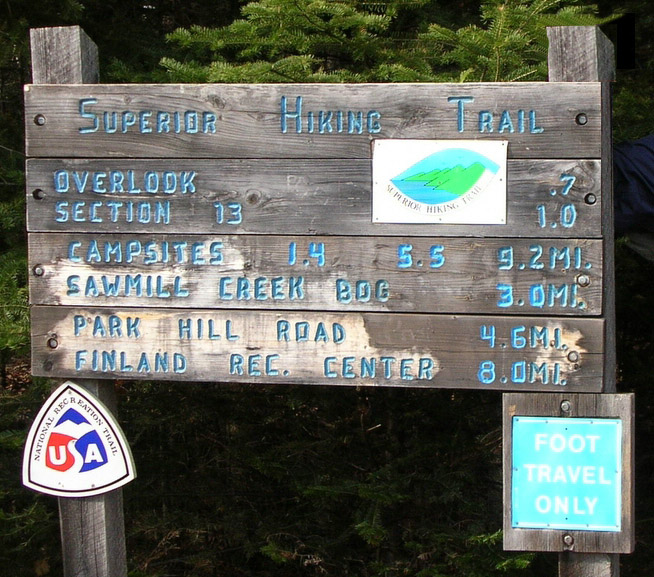
- A sign at a Superior Hiking Trail trailhead near Finland, Minnesota
- Length: 310 mi (500 km)
- Location: Cook / Lake / Saint Louis / Carlton counties, Minnesota, United States
- Trailheads: Near Jay Cooke State Park; Canada–US border near Lake Superior
- Use: Hiking
- Highest point: 1,829 ft (557 m)
- Lowest point: Lake Superior, 602 ft (183 m)
- Difficulty: Moderate
- Season: Late spring to early fall
- Sights: Lake Superior, Iron Range, state parks
- Hazards: Severe weather, black bears, Lyme disease

The Superior Hiking Trail, also known as the SHT, is a 310-mile (500 km) long hiking trail in northeastern Minnesota that follows the rocky ridges overlooking Lake Superior for most of its length. The trail travels through forests of birch, aspen, pine, fir, and cedar. Hikers enjoy views of boreal forests, the Sawtooth Mountains, babbling brooks, rushing waterfalls, and abundant wildlife. The lowest point in the path is 602 ft (183 m) above sea level and the highest point is 1,829 ft (557 m) above sea level. The footpath is intended for hiking only. Motorized vehicles, mountain bikes, and horses are not allowed on the trail. Many people use the trail for long-distance hiking, and facilitating this purpose are 94 backcountry, fee-free campsites.

== History ==
Construction of the Superior Hiking Trail began in the mid-1980s, and the trail now extends 310 miles (500 km) from the Minnesota-Wisconsin border southwest of Duluth to the Canada–US border. In addition there are 17 miles (27 km) of spur trails that connect trailheads to the main trail. Inspiration for building the trail came from the Appalachian Trail, which extends from Georgia to Maine. The Superior Hiking Trail Association (SHTA) was formed in 1986 to manage the construction, planning, and day-to-day care of the trail. The SHTA received several grants from the State of Minnesota, three of which were from the Legislative Commission on Minnesota Resources. This money helped jump start the construction of the trail and funded construction for the first few years. In 1987, the trail had an opening ceremony at Britton Peak to celebrate the beginning of construction. The ceremony included a log-cutting event and many state government officials and SHTA founders attended. Three years later, in August 1990, the trail had reached a half-way mark and another celebration was held. That celebration included a 140-mile (230 km) hike for about a dozen brave hikers who completed it in 12 days. Since 1991, a 100-mile (160 km) ultramarathon known as the "Superior 100", along with several other races, has been hosted annually on the Superior Hiking Trail. In 1995, Paul Hlina, who was paralyzed from the waist down, hiked the entire trail on crutches and is now known as the first hiker to thru-hike the trail. He raised $16,000 in pledges for the Superior Hiking Trail Association, the non-profit organization which maintains the trail. Trail construction and improvements continued, and in 2016, the 30th year of trail construction, the Superior Hiking Trail became a continuous footpath from the Minnesota-Wisconsin border to the 270 Degree Overlook near the Canada–US border. The Superior Hiking Trail is now a portion of the North Country National Scenic Trail, a National Scenic Trail that stretches over 4,600 miles (7,400 km) from North Dakota to Vermont.

== Sections of the trail ==
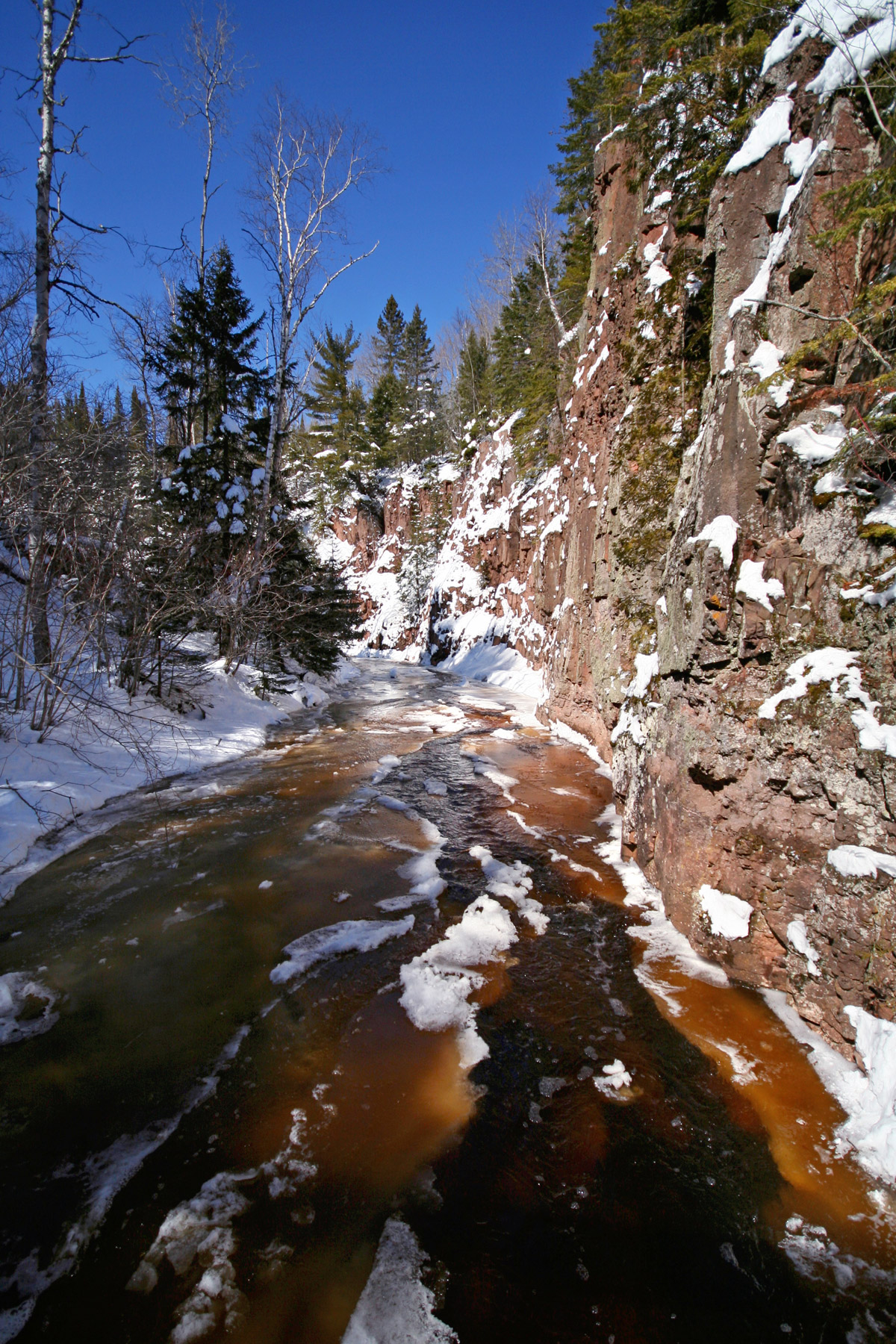
Crow Creek in winter from the SHT

There are two primary sections to the Superior Hiking Trail.

The Duluth section of the trail comprises 50 miles (80 km) and starts southwest of the city of Duluth at the Minnesota-Wisconsin border. The trail extends to the northeast through Jay Cooke State Park, the Spirit Mountain Recreation Area, Brewer Park, Enger Park, the Historic Downtown Area, Canal Park, the Lakewalk, and Hartley Nature Center, before it ends at a trailhead located on Martin Road on the north side of the city. The Duluth section is particularly suited for day hiking. There is only one backcountry campground, located near the Minnesota-Wisconsin border, along the Duluth section.

The North Shore section of the trail is 260 miles (420 km) long and begins at the Martin Road Trailhead on the northern boundary of the City of Duluth. From there, the trail extends to the northeast along Lake Superior through seven state parks, including Gooseberry Falls State Park, Split Rock Lighthouse State Park and Tettegouche State Park. This section of the SHT passes near the towns of Lutsen and Grand Marais, and ends just before the Canada–United States border. The North Shore section provides backcountry experiences and is utilized by both day hikers and backpackers. The Superior Hiking Trail Association maintains 93 backcountry campgrounds along the North Shore section, and a traditional thru-hike of the Superior Hiking Trail typically spans this 260 miles (420 km) section. The total elevation gain along the North Shore section is 37,800 feet (11,500 m) and the elevation loss is 37,400 feet (11,400 m) for a northbound hiker.

On the northern end the Superior Hiking Trail is connected to the 65-mile (105 km) long Border Route Trail which starts a short distance from the trail head on Otter Lake Road. This then connects to the 41-mile (66 km) long Kekekabic Trail which gives the hiker the ability to hike all the way through the Boundary Waters Canoe Area Wilderness and end near Ely.

== The Superior Hiking Trail Association ==
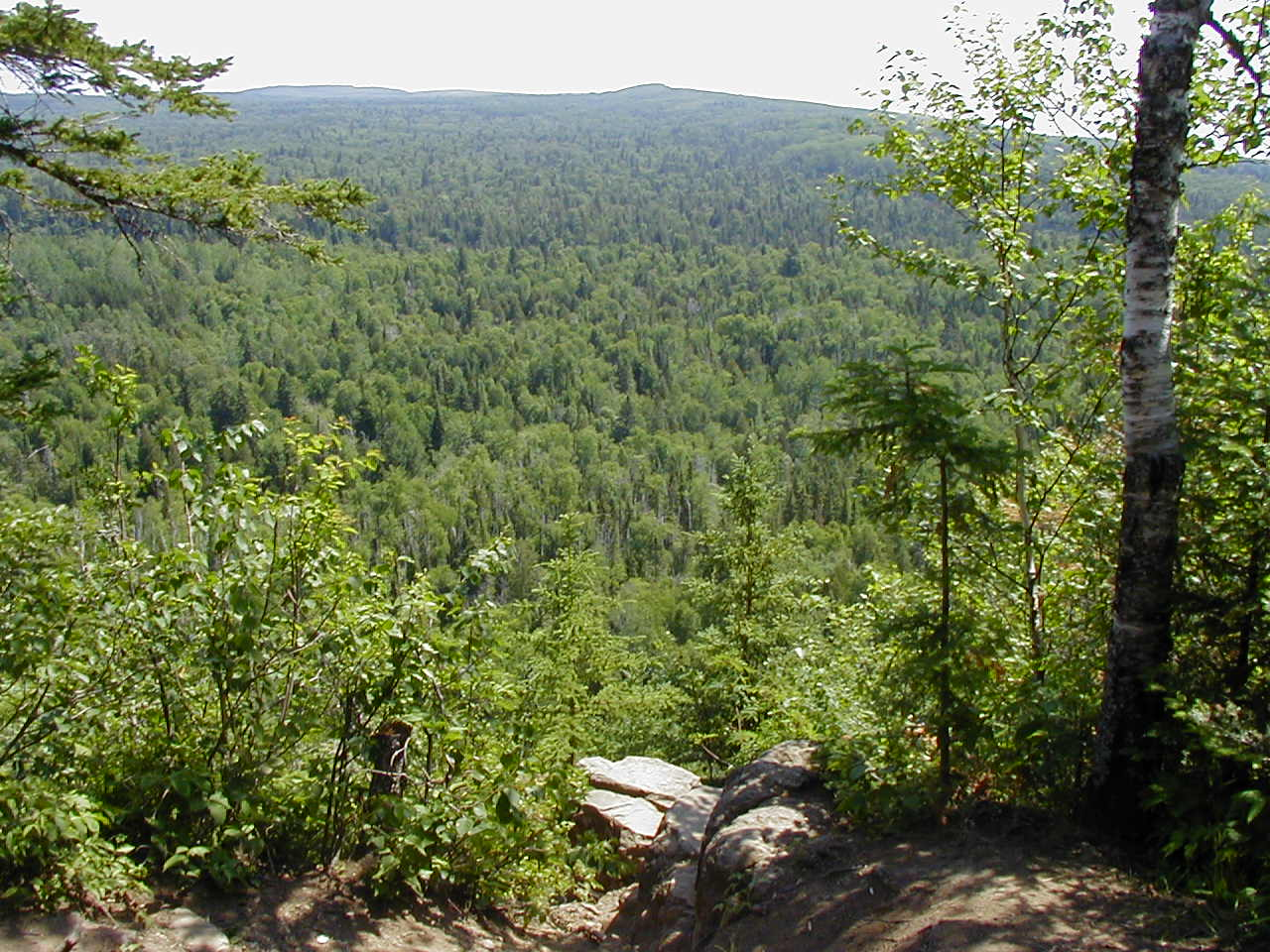
Looking east from Lookout Mountain in Cascade River State Park

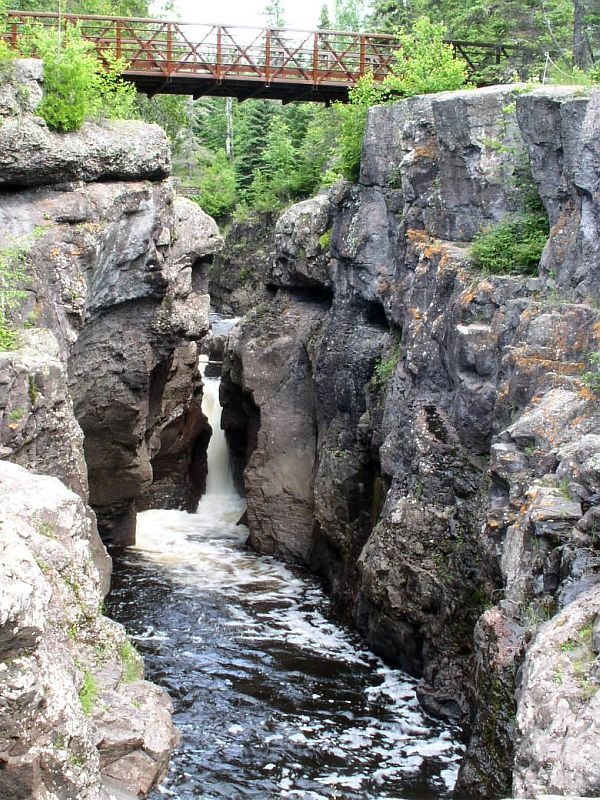
Temperance River State Park Bridge

The Superior Hiking Trail Association (SHTA) builds, promotes and maintains the trail. It is a Minnesota-based non-profit corporation with more than 3200 members. The association produces a quarterly newsletter called The Ridgeline for its members which contains noteworthy news of the trail, trail volunteer bios, and association financial information. The most visible activities of the SHTA are the popular organized hikes featuring leaders with interpretive skills, such as naturalists, geologists, photographers, and historians and ranging from day hikes to backpacking trips of several days' duration.

The trail was mostly built by crews of people that were hired from local towns or by the Minnesota Conservation Corps. In addition, the SHTA coordinates the efforts of numerous volunteers who assist with trail and campground construction and maintenance. These volunteers include interested individuals, scout troops, and other outdoor organizations. Some groups have chosen to adopt a section of the trail to maintain, while others participate in scheduled maintenance hikes.

== Accolades ==
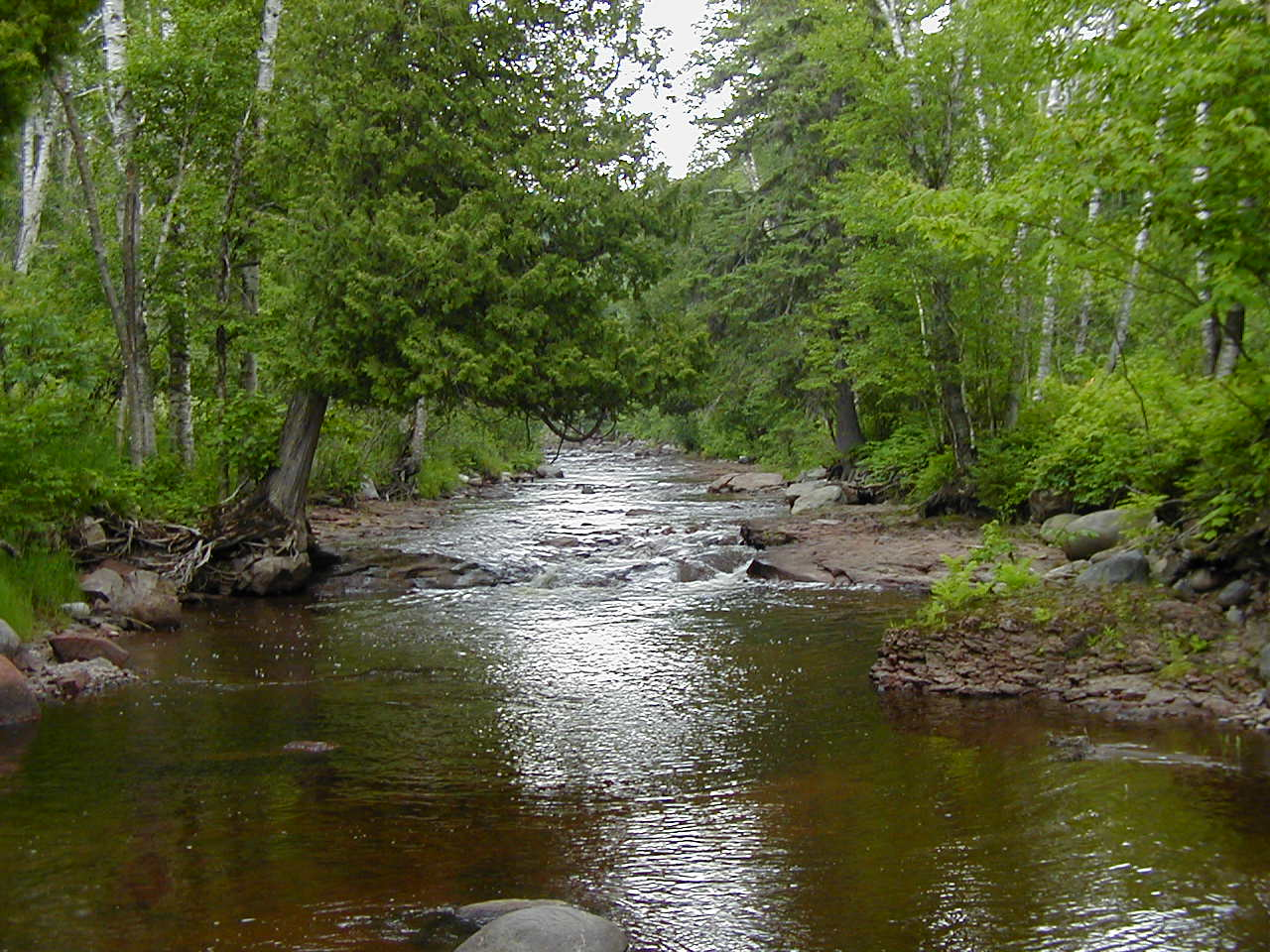
Looking upstream on the Caribou River

In December 2000, Backpacker Magazine named the Superior Hiking Trail the trail with the "Best Trail/Camp/Shelter Conditions," the trail with the "Best Signage" in the country, and one of the most scenic trails in the nation. Writer and backpacker Andrew Skurka says the Superior Hiking Trail is one of his ten favorite hikes in America. In 2005, Reader's Digest listed the Superior Hiking Trail as one of the "5 Best Hikes in America," and in 2015, The Guardian included the trail among the "top 10 long-distance hiking trails in the US."

== See also ==
- Long-distance trails in the United States
