= Snowbank Trail =

Hiking trail in Minnesota, United States

Coordinates: 47°58′46″N 91°25′22″W

The Snowbank Trail is a hiking trail in the Boundary Waters Canoe Area Wilderness (BWCAW) in northern Minnesota. The trail runs the perimeter of Snowbank Lake and crosses the Kekekabic Trail at the south side of Snowbank Lake. The entire trail comprises a 28.1-mile (45.2 km) loop, numerous campsites are available. It is located in Fall Lake Township in northernmost Lake County. It is open year-round and is always considered beautiful no matter what time you visit. Dogs are allowed, but they must be leashed.

The trail is pretty difficult and risky, even for the intrepid hiker. It's rugged with several changes in ups and downs, as well how it isn't that clearly marked and deceptive spurs are able to take people off course.

Editor's Note: The Following information was obtained from a 2003 Forest Service Survey of the Trail. A lot of stuff can happen over the years, including new beaver dams, bridges and campsites. But this wiki has the basic information to help someone hike the trail.

The Snowbank Trail typically passes through rolling terrain of 0 to 20%. If there are steeper grades it is noted in the text. Smitty's on Snowbank is the closest resort to the Trailhead. It is just up the road from the trailhead. They have motel rooms, cabins and are known for their Hungry Man Breakfast. They can also transport you and your gear across Snowbank Lake if you want to do some base camp hiking. Permit are needed for hiking in the designated wilderness area. If you are just day hiking, you need to fill out a self issued permit located at the Trailhead. If you are camping overnight in the designated wilderness area, you will need to buy a fee permit which can be obtained at a Forest Service office or most Resorts and Outfitters. Voyagers North Outfitters in Ely seems to be the place that is open the latest at night. They are open until 10 pm during the season.

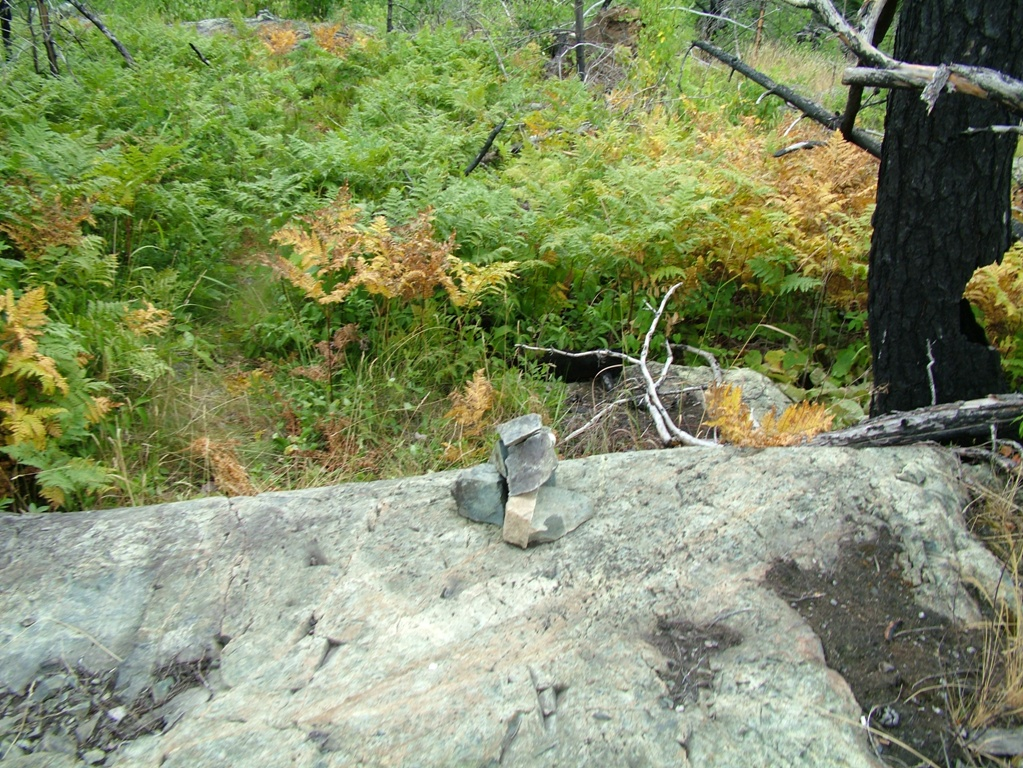
A cairn trail marker on Snowbank Trail. This is a typical trail marker found across State and National parks in the United States.

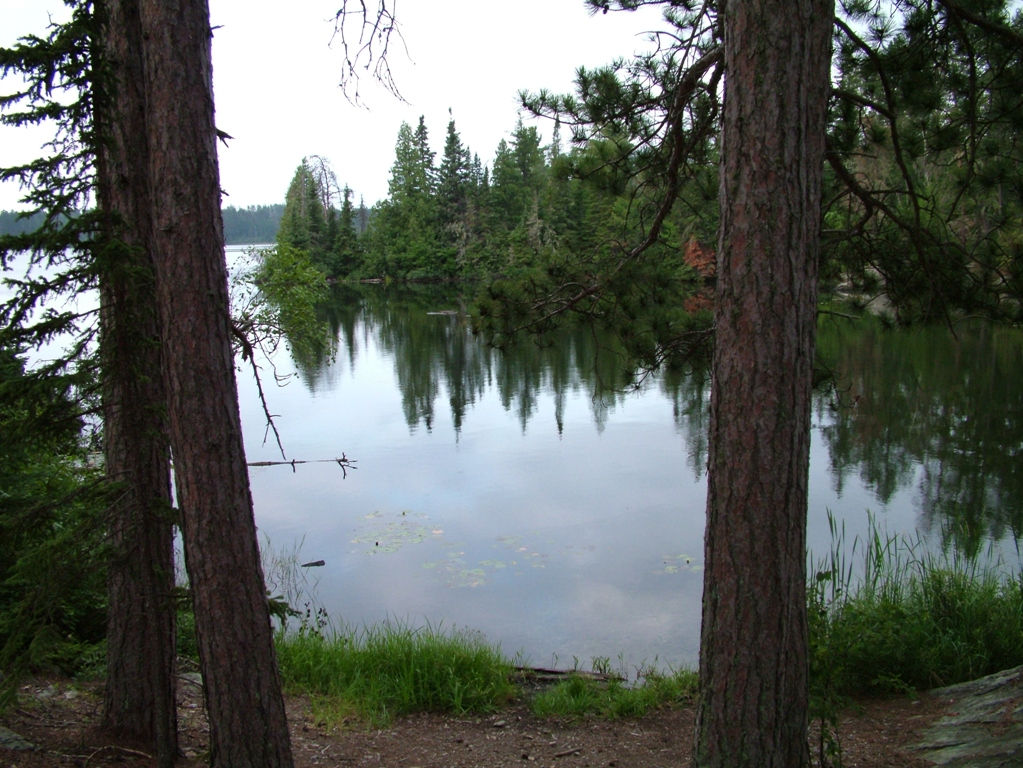
Snowbank Lake taken from a campsite just off Snowbank Trail.

An unusually well groomed section of Snowbank Trail.

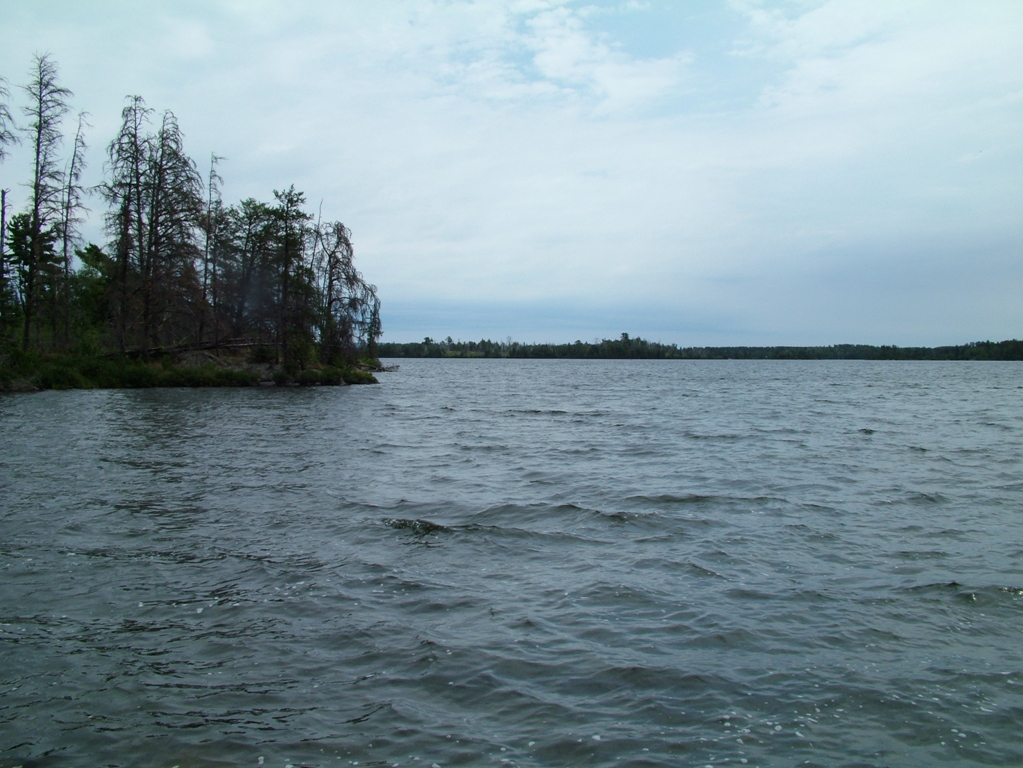
SnowBank Lake from the Flash Lake portage.
