= Border Route Trail =

Long-distance hiking trail in the United States

Coordinates: 48°6′N 90°27′W

- Length: 65 mi (105 km)
- Location: Cook County, Minnesota, United States
- Trailheads: Near Superior Hiking Trail at Otter Lake Road; Kekakabic Trail, Boundary Waters Canoe Area Wilderness
- Use: Hiking
- Difficulty: Moderate to Difficult (for route-finding)
- Season: Late spring to early fall
- Sights: Boundary Waters Canoe Area Wilderness
- Hazards: Severe weather, black bears, penchant to go astray from trail

The Border Route Trail is a 65-mile (105 km) long hiking trail that crosses the Boundary Waters Canoe Area Wilderness (BWCAW) in the far northeast corner of Minnesota (Arrowhead) and follows the international border between Minnesota and Ontario, Canada. It connects with the Superior Hiking Trail on its eastern terminus and with the Kekekabic Trail on its western end at the Gunflint Trail (Cook Cty. Road 12). In addition to the eastern and western termini, the Border Route Trail can be accessed through several spur and connecting trails, allowing for hiking trips ranging from short day-hikes to multiday backpacking expeditions. It is known for its dramatic topography, rugged nature, and outstanding vistas. Many of the vistas overlook the US - Canada border chain of lakes, also known as the Voyageur highway.

The Border Route Trail Association was incorporated in 2004 to coordinate the maintenance and increase public awareness of the trail. Legislation passed by Congress in 2019 enacted a major re-route of the North Country Trail in northern Minnesota which included the Border Route Trail as an official part of the North Country Trail along with the Kekekabic and Superior Hiking Trails.

The trail was planned and built in the early 1970s by the Minnesota Rovers Outing Club with the help of the Minnesota Department of Natural Resources and the US Forest Service. It was the first long-distance, wilderness backpacking and hiking trail in Minnesota planned and constructed by volunteers.
