= Kekekabic Trail =

American hiking trail in Minnesota

Coordinates: 48°03′03″N 91°10′07″W

The Kekekabic Trail, commonly referred to as "The Kek," is a hiking trail that runs about 39 miles from Snowbank Road near Ely, Minnesota to the eastern terminus on the Gunflint Trail in northwestern Cook County. It connects with the Border Route Trail on its eastern terminus. The Kekekabic Trail runs through the center of the Boundary Waters Canoe Area Wilderness and begins opposite the Snowbank Trailhead on the Ely side. Most of the trail lies in Lake County. The Kekekabic is known for being very remote, primitive and rugged in nature, and for solitude.

The trail's landscape and hiking experience can be divided into thirds. The western third lies mostly in a forest canopy of aspen, jack pine, some large white pine, and boreal conifers. There was a major blowdown in 2016 from the west trailhead to near Thomas Lake. The middle third passes through the remnants of the 1999 blowdown and the forest is composed of young trees, some large white pines that survived the storm, many broken off snags, and many downfalls. The eastern third, east of Agamok Bridge, passes through parts of the 1999 blowdown that also burned in the Ham Lake and Cavity Lake wildfires. Here, the trail passes through areas where a majority of the tree canopy was killed by the fires. Aspen, birch, and Jack Pines are growing back quickly and there are also several open grassy sections near Seahorse Lake.

The Kekekabic is an official part of the North Country National Scenic Trail and is maintained by the Kekekabic Trail Club Chapter of the North Country Trail Association. The Chapter publishes a regularly updated guidebook for the trail that features detailed descriptions and hiking maps. The Chapter is also responsible for developing 20+ miles of the North Country Scenic Trail in between the Kekekabic Trail and Ely.
