= Rush Creek Regional Trail =

Bicycle trail

The Rush Creek Regional Trail is a bicycle trail in Minnesota that runs from the Coon Rapids Dam in Brooklyn Park to Elm Creek Park Reserve in Maple Grove. The trail runs 9.64 miles (15.51 km) and is maintained by Three Rivers Park District.

== Route description ==
Rush Creek Trail starts at the Coon Rapids Dam in Brooklyn Park. The trail heads west and goes through the West Coon Rapids Dam Visitor Center parking lot. The trail then crosses the Mississippi River Trail (MRT, also known as the West River Parkway). The trail then starts heading through rural north Brooklyn Park. The trail crosses both Noble Parkway, where it also crosses the Shingle Creek Regional Trail, and Zane Avenue via tunnels. The trail crosses Winnetka Avenue and then goes over US Highway 169 via a bridge right before exiting Brooklyn Park into Maple Grove. The trail crosses Jefferson Highway via a stoplight-controlled crosswalk. The terrain in Maple Grove is very different from Brooklyn Park. Maple Grove's is more a northern look—a lot of trees—where Brooklyn Park has more of a farm look. The trail crosses James Dean Parkway at the Elm Creek Park Preserve. The trail then goes through the park and ends at Medicine Lake Trail.

== Future ==
The Three Rivers Park District is planning on extending the Rush Creek trail to Crow Hassan park in Hassan Township.

City	Trail/Road	Notes
Brooklyn Park	Mississippi River Trail	Crosswalk
Brooklyn Park	Noble Avenue	Croosswalk
Brooklyn Park	Noble Parkway, Shingle Creek Trail	Tunnel
Brooklyn Park	Zane Avenue	Tunnel
Brooklyn Park	Winnetka Avenue	Crosswalk
Brooklyn Park	US 169	Overpass/bridge
Maple Grove	Jefferson Highway	Crosswalk with stoplights
Maple Grove	James Dean Parkway	Crosswalk
Maple Grove	Medicine Lake Trail	Crosswalk
