= Medicine Lake (Minnesota) =

Lake in Hennepin County, Minnesota, United States

- Bde Siŋkpe (Dakota)
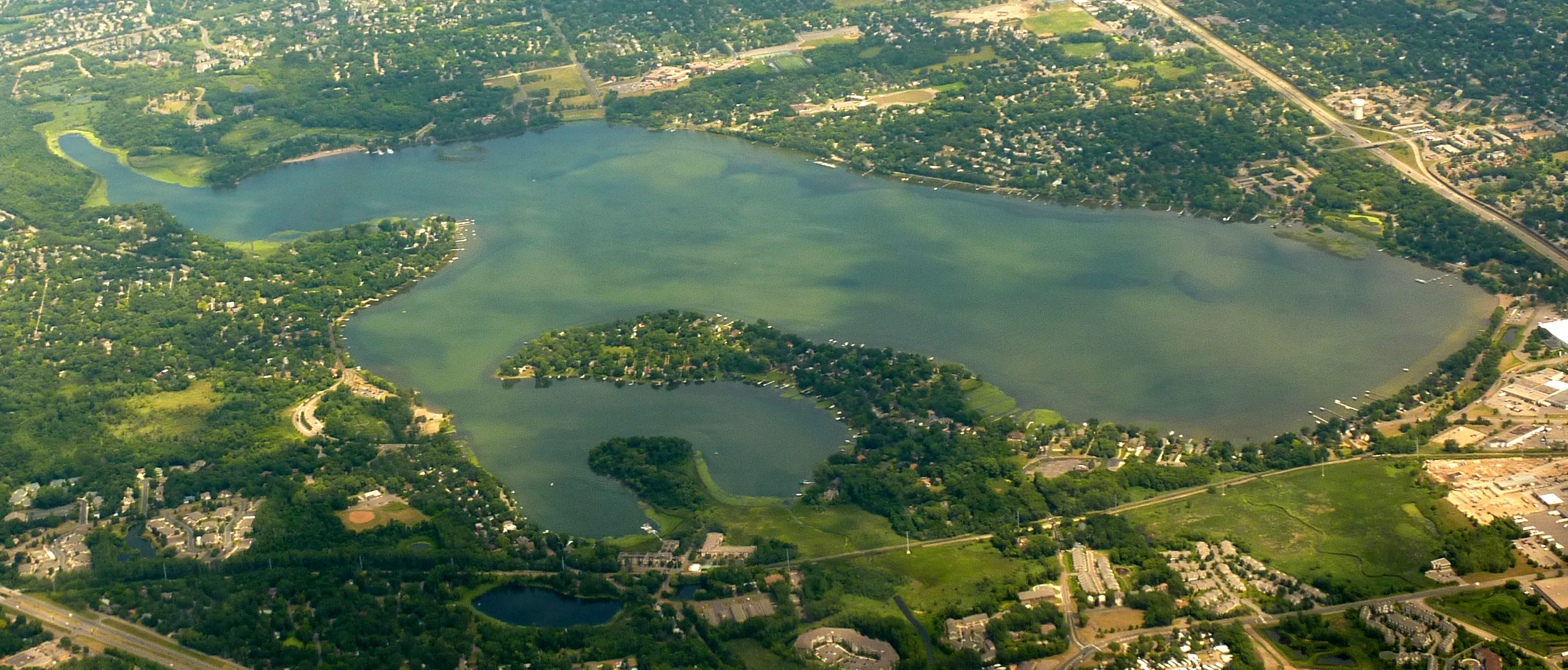
- Aerial view of Medicine Lake. The municipality of Medicine Lake lies on the peninsula in the south of the lake. In the foreground is West Medicine Lake Park and in the upper left corner is French Regional Park.

- Location within Minnesota Location within the United States
- Location: Hennepin County, Minnesota, United States
- Coordinates: 45°00′30″N 93°25′15″W
- Primary outflows: Bassett Creek
- Surface area: 902 acres (365 ha)
- Average depth: 17.5 feet (5.3 m)
- Max. depth: 49 feet (15 m)
- Surface elevation: Ordinary high water level: 889.1 feet (271.0 m); Normal water level: 887.1 feet (270.4 m)
- Settlements: Medicine Lake, Plymouth

Medicine Lake (Dakota: Bde Siŋkpe) is an inland lake located approximately 8 miles northwest of downtown Minneapolis, Minnesota. The lake lies within Hennepin County and is surrounded by two municipalities. At 902 acres, it is Hennepin County's second largest lake behind Lake Minnetonka and is popular among boaters, sailors, and fishers. Medicine Lake's most significant tributary is Plymouth Creek, which enters the lake at West Medicine Lake Park. The lake is also fed by rain and drainage from nearby cities, including Medicine Lake, Plymouth, New Hope, Golden Valley and Minnetonka.

== Recreation ==
Medicine Lake is a major recreational resource for the area. Three public parks, French Regional Park, West Medicine Lake Park and East Medicine Lake Park, are located along the shores of the lake.

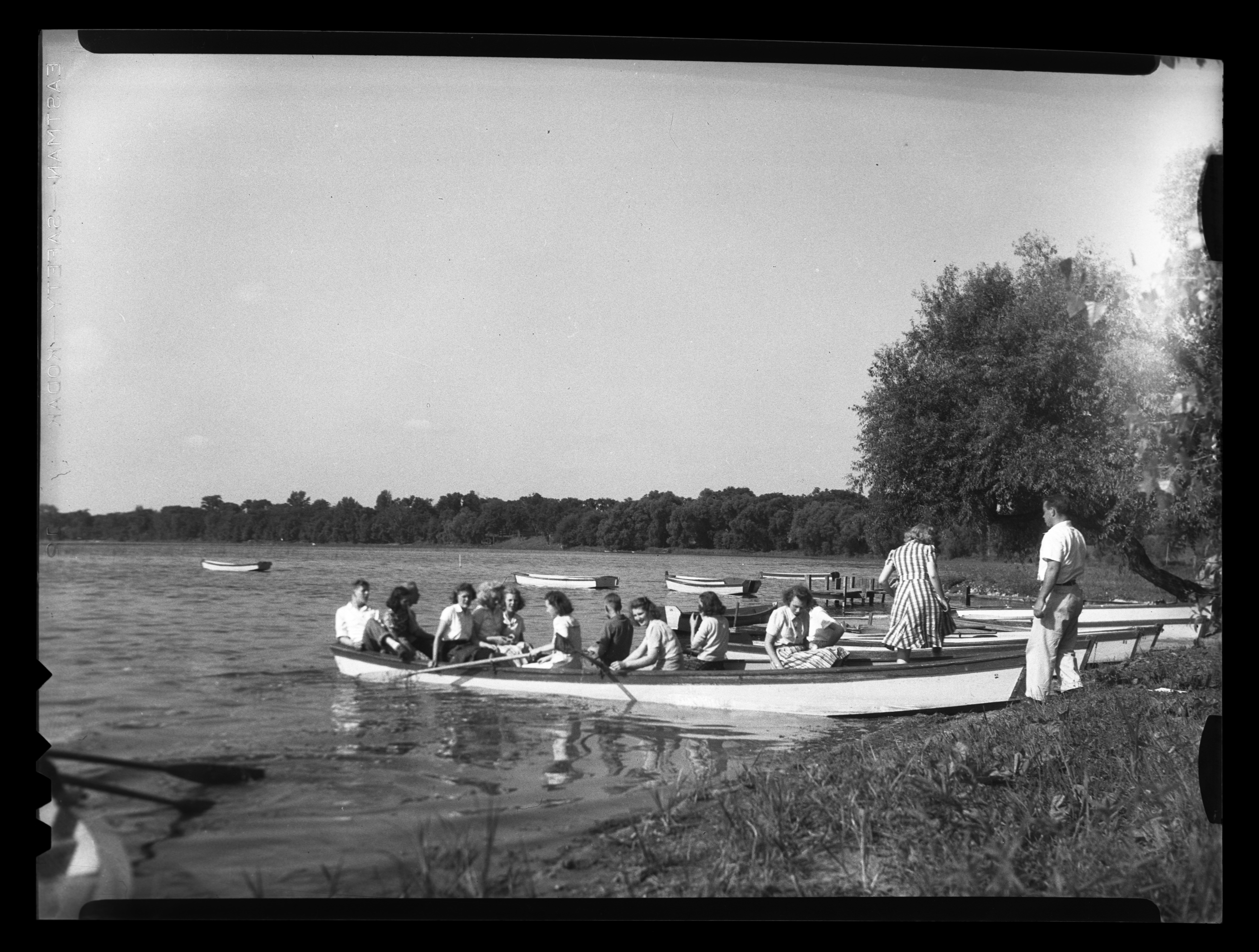
Boat on Medicine Lake circa 1934.

Medicine Lake is popular for recreational fishing. According to the Minnesota DNR, the following species of fish can be found in the lake: black bullhead, black crappie, bluegill, brown bullhead, green sunfish, hybrid sunfish, largemouth bass, northern pike, pumpkinseed, walleye, white crappie, yellow bullhead, yellow perch, bowfin (dogfish), common carp, goldeye, smallmouth buffalo, white sucker, banded killifish, blacknose shiner, bluntnose minnow, brook silverside, central mudminnow, golden shiner, Johnny darter, spottail shiner.

== Limnology ==
=== Hydrology ===
Medicine Lake typically freezes over during the winter months. The City of Medicine Lake, as well as the Minnesota DNR record ice-out dates for the lake.

=== Environmental issues ===
==== Water quality ====
The Bassett Creek Watershed Management Commission has monitored the water quality of Medicine Lake since 1972. In 2016, it published a report on major findings. According to the 2016 report, the Bassett Creek Watershed Management Commission monitored Medicine lake for:

- Water chemistry (nutrients, chlorophyll a, chloride).
- Water measurements (e.g., clarity, dissolved oxygen).
- Phytoplankton and zooplankton (microscopic aquatic plants and animals).
- Macrophytes (aquatic plants).

The study found that "Medicine Lake does not meet applicable Minnesota Pollution Control Agency (MPCA) and BCWMC water quality standards for lakes. Trend analyses indicate chlorophyll a concentrations have increased significantly over the past 20 years."

==== Invasive species ====
Several invasive species inhabit the lake. Among these are curly-leaf pondweed and Eurasian milfoil.

Medicine Lake has also been confirmed for the presence of zebra mussels. On November 1, 2017, a resident notified the Minnesota DNR regarding a potential zebra mussel on a dock that the resident had pulled from the lake. On November 2, Minnesota DNR staff verified it was a zebra mussel and found two additional zebra mussels on two other docks in the lake. On November 9, 2017, the Minnesota DNR issued a press release publicly confirming that it had found zebra mussels in the lake.

In 2018, the Minnesota DNR confirmed the existence of another invasive species--starry stonewort. The discovery of starry stonewort was the first confirmed case of the species in Minnesota in 2018 and only the twelfth case overall. A Three Rivers Park District watercraft inspector discovered the plant on a boat propeller after it was pulled from the lake. Following a DNR survey in 2018, the invasive species was found to live in about 14 acres of the lake.

== Community involvement and activities ==
=== Groups ===
The Association of Medicine Lake Area Citizens, also known as AMLAC, is a volunteer organization which hosts various projects and stays up to date on issues relevant to Medicine Lake. It offers membership to anyone who lives near or uses Medicine Lake. In 2017, "members walked the shoreline of the entire lake, in partnership with Three Rivers Park District, to inspect docks on shore for zebra mussels." In 2018, AMLAC petitioned the City of Plymouth to close the Medicine Lake boat launch located at West Medicine Lake Park after the discovery of starry stonewort in the lake.

=== Events ===
Medicine Lake was the original location of the Twin Cities' Art Shanty Project until the project relocated to White Bear Lake in 2014. The project subsequently relocated to Minneapolis's Lake Harriet.

The popular Holes 4 Heroes ice-fishing tournament has also been held on Medicine Lake for a number of years. "Holes 4 Heroes is a special Ice Fishing Contest designed to honor our military, both at home and abroad." The contest features a "Hole of Honor" which utilizes a live video feed so that families of deployed soldiers can ice fish for free while being video linked to a soldier.
