= Medicine Lake, Minnesota =

City in Minnesota, United States

- City
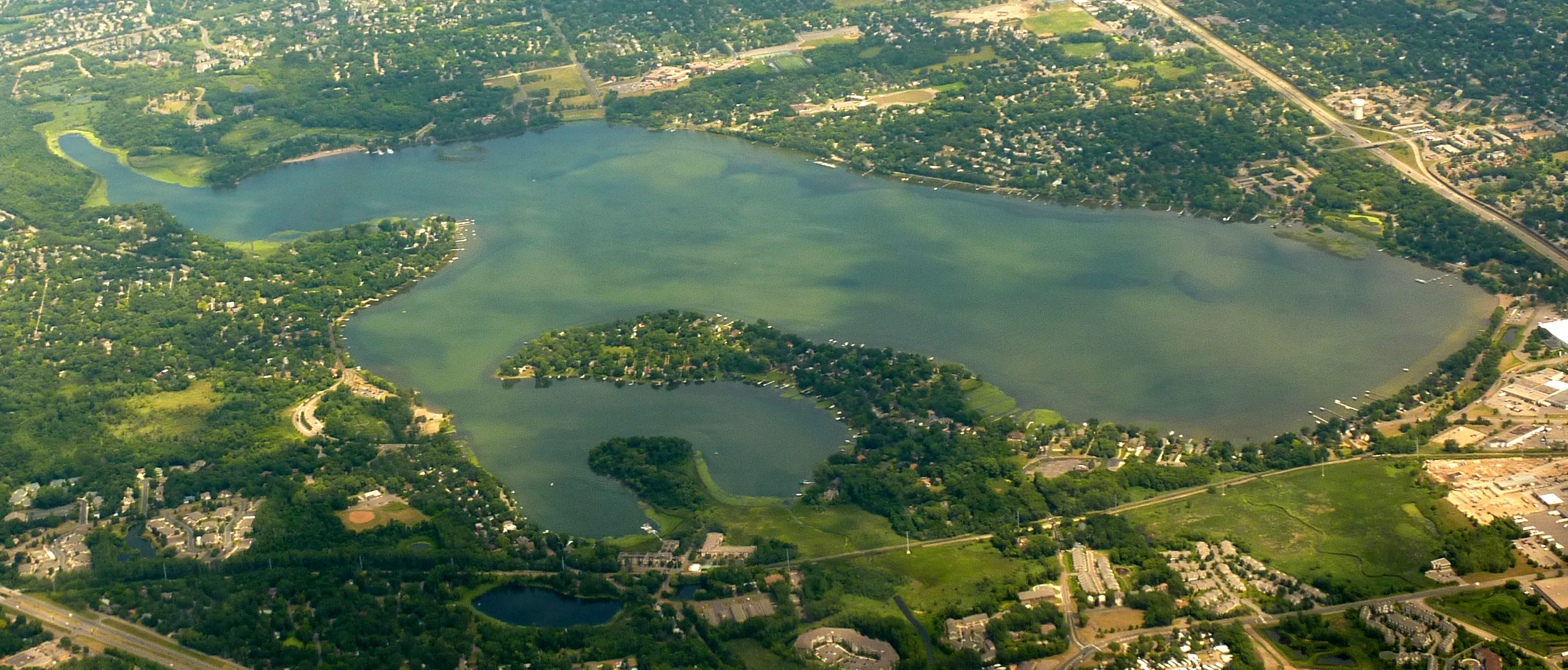
- Medicine Lake juts into the eponymous body of water; it consists of the large, curving peninsula.

- Seal
- Motto: "Where water meets the sky."
- Location of Medicine Lake, Minnesota
- Coordinates: 44.995786°N 93.418072°W
- Country: United States
- State: Minnesota
- County: Hennepin
- Founded: 1887
- Incorporated: April 5, 1944

Government
  - Type: Council–Manager
  - Mayor: Chris Heim
  - City Council: Bill McNaughton; Nina Zelazny; Ruth Hovey; Ron Tomczik

Area
  - Total: 0.371 sq mi (0.961 km^{2})
  - Land: 0.173 sq mi (0.447 km^{2})
  - Water: 0.198 sq mi (0.513 km^{2}) 53.37%
- Elevation: 899 ft (274 m)

Population (2020)
  - Total: 337
  - Estimate (2025): 1,342
  - Density: 7,785.5/sq mi (3,005.99/km^{2})
- Time zone: UTC–6 (Central (CST))
  - Summer (DST): UTC–5 (CDT)
- ZIP Code: 55441
- Area code: 763
- FIPS code: 27-41462
- GNIS feature ID: 0647733
- Sales tax: 8.525%
- Website: www.cityofmedicinelake.com

Medicine Lake is a city in Hennepin County, Minnesota, United States. Located on a peninsula that juts into a lake of the same name. The population was 337 at the 2020 census, and was estimated to be 1,342 in 2025.

== History ==
"Medicine Lake Park" was developed as part of Plymouth, Minnesota by Jacob Barge around 1887. He sold lots to "city folks" to build cabins to get away from the "hustle and bustle" of city life. The City of Medicine Lake became an independent municipality in 1944. That year, residents voted to separate from Plymouth, Minnesota, even though Plymouth surrounds the city geographically. The move toward separation was spearheaded by Mr. Les Johantgen, Mr. Charles Brudigan and Mr. Ernest Ertl, among others. Residents held a meeting on April 14, 1944, to discuss separation from Plymouth. The first referendum on this separation was duly recorded on April 24 of the same year.

== Geography ==
According to the United States Census Bureau, the city has a total area of 0.371 square miles (0.96 km^{2}), of which 0.173 square miles (0.45 km^{2}) is land and 0.198 square miles (0.51 km^{2}) (53.37%) is water.

The city is completely surrounded by the city of Plymouth, and forms a peninsula stretching into the lake that it is named after. The 45th Parallel (North) passes directly through the City of Medicine Lake, as well as through Medicine Lake.

Minnesota State Highway 55 is 0.5 mile from the community.

== Demographics ==
Historical population
Census	Pop.	Note	%±
1950	284		—
1960	323		13.7%
1970	446		38.1%
1980	419		−6.1%
1990	385		−8.1%
2000	368		−4.4%
2010	371		0.8%
2020	337		−9.2%
2025 (est.)	1,342		298.2%
U.S. Decennial Census; 2020 Census

As of the 2023 American Community Survey, there are 215 estimated households in Medicine Lake with an average of 2.52 persons per household. The city has a median household income of $161,250. Approximately 2.6% of the city's population lives at or below the poverty line. Medicine Lake has an estimated 68.4% employment rate, with 71.0% of the population holding a bachelor's degree or higher and 99.7% holding a high school diploma.

The top five reported ancestries (people were allowed to report up to two ancestries, thus the figures will generally add to more than 100%) were English (99.1%), Spanish (0.2%), Indo-European (0.2%), Asian and Pacific Islander (0.6%), and Other (0.0%).

The median age in the city was 44.9 years.

=== 2020 census ===
As of the 2020 census, there were 337 people, 154 households, and 93 families residing in the city. The population density was 1,947.98 inhabitants per square mile (752.1/km^{2}). There were 164 housing units at an average density of 947.98 per square mile (366.0/km^{2}). The racial makeup of the city was 90.80% White, 0.00% African American, 0.00% Native American, 1.19% Asian, 0.00% Pacific Islander, 0.00% from some other races and 2.67% from two or more races. Hispanic or Latino people of any race were 2.37% of the population.

=== 2010 census ===
As of the 2010 census, there were 371 people, 160 households, and 104 families residing in the city. The population density was 2,061.1 inhabitants per square mile (795.8/km^{2}). There were 174 housing units at an average density of 966.7 per square mile (373.2/km^{2}). The racial makeup of the city was 89.76% White, 4.31% African American, 1.35% Native American, 2.16% Asian, 0.00% Pacific Islander, 0.00% from some other races and 2.43% from two or more races. Hispanic or Latino people of any race were 1.35% of the population.

There were 160 households, of which 23.8% had children under the age of 18 living with them, 51.9% were married couples living together, 7.5% had a female householder with no husband present, 5.6% had a male householder with no wife present, and 35.0% were non-families. 28.1% of all households were made up of individuals, and 8.2% had someone living alone who was 65 years of age or older. The average household size was 2.32 and the average family size was 2.88.

The median age in the city was 47.7 years. 21.6% of residents were under the age of 18; 4.3% were between the ages of 18 and 24; 19.4% were from 25 to 44; 39.4% were from 45 to 64; and 15.4% were 65 years of age or older. The gender makeup of the city was 52.3% male and 47.7% female.

=== 2000 census ===
As of the 2000 census, there were 368 people, 159 households, and 94 families residing in the city. The population density was 2,133.1 inhabitants per square mile (823.6/km^{2}). There were 170 housing units at an average density of 985.4 per square mile (380.5/km^{2}). The racial makeup of the city was 95.38% White, 0.54% African American, 0.00% Native American, 2.45% Asian, 0.00% Pacific Islander, 0.00% from some other races and 1.63% from two or more races. Hispanic or Latino people of any race were 1.36% of the population.

In terms of ancestry, 23.9% were of German, 14.0% Norwegian, 13.7% Swedish, 6.4% Dutch, 6.1% English and 5.1% Polish.

There were 159 households, out of which 25.2% had children under the age of 18 living with them, 54.1% were married couples living together, 3.8% had a female householder with no husband present, and 40.3% were non-families. 32.7% of all households were made up of individuals, and 6.3% had someone living alone who was 65 years of age or older. The average household size was 2.31 and the average family size was 3.02.

In the city, the population was spread out, with 20.9% under the age of 18, 6.3% from 18 to 24, 29.9% from 25 to 44, 32.3% from 45 to 64, and 10.6% who were 65 years of age or older. The median age was 41 years. For every 100 females, there were 103.3 males. For every 100 females age 18 and over, there were 104.9 males.

The median income for a household in the city was $70,750, and the median income for a family was $100,382. Males had a median income of $51,250 versus $37,125 for females. The per capita income for the city was $45,942. None of the families and 1.1% of the population were living below the poverty line, including no under eighteens and none of those over 64.

== Education ==
=== Public schools ===
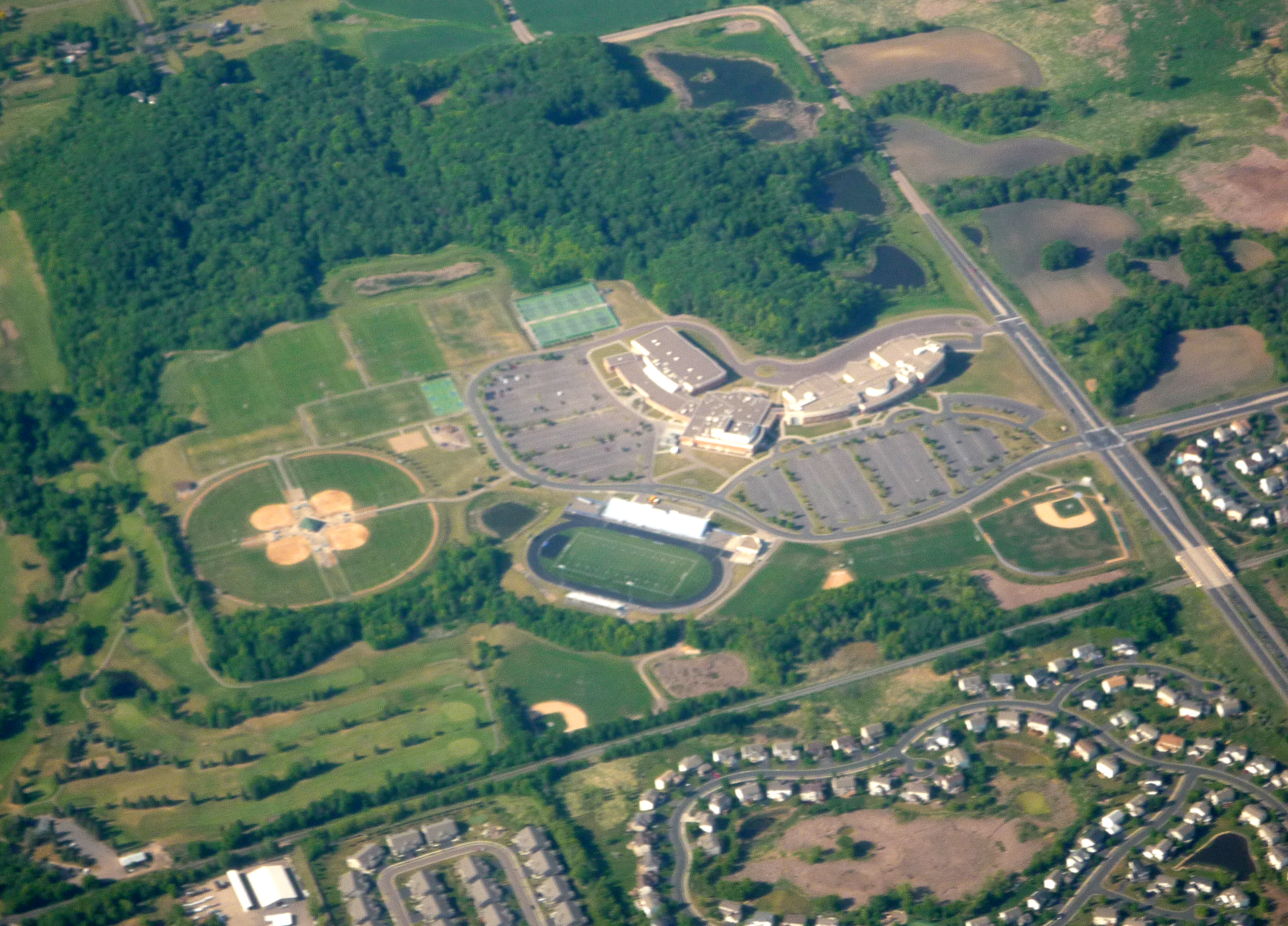
Wayzata High School

Medicine Lake is part of the Wayzata Public Schools (ISD 284). Students can also attend public schools in other school districts chosen by their families under Minnesota's open enrollment statute. Wayzata Public Schools has set attendance boundaries so that children living in the City of Medicine Lake attend the following progression of schools:

- Sunset Hill Elementary School
- Wayzata East Middle School
- Wayzata High School

Wayzata High School is operated by the Wayzata School District, has approximately 3,711 students in grades 9 to 12 (as of 10/1/2023), making it the largest secondary school by enrollment in Minnesota. Projected enrollment for the 2023-2024 School Year is 13,339. It is also the largest Minnesota secondary school by structural size, with an interior of 487,000 square feet (45,200 m2). The school is part of the Lake Conference.

In 2008, Newsweek ranked the school #940 "List of the 1300 Top High Schools in America."

== Politics ==
Medicine Lake is located in Minnesota's 3rd congressional district, represented in the U.S. House of Representatives by Kelly Morrison, a Democrat. Redistricting after the 2020 Census placed Medicine Lake in Minnesota District 42B. Current legislators are Representative Ginny Klevorn, Democrat, and Senator Bonnie Westlin, Democrat.

== Notable people ==
- Terry Gilliam – American-born British screenwriter, film director, animator, actor and member of the Monty Python comedy troupe. His family moved to Medicine Lake soon after Gilliam was born in Minneapolis in 1940.
- Lois McMaster Bujold – American speculative fiction writer.
